= Buildings and architecture of Brighton and Hove =

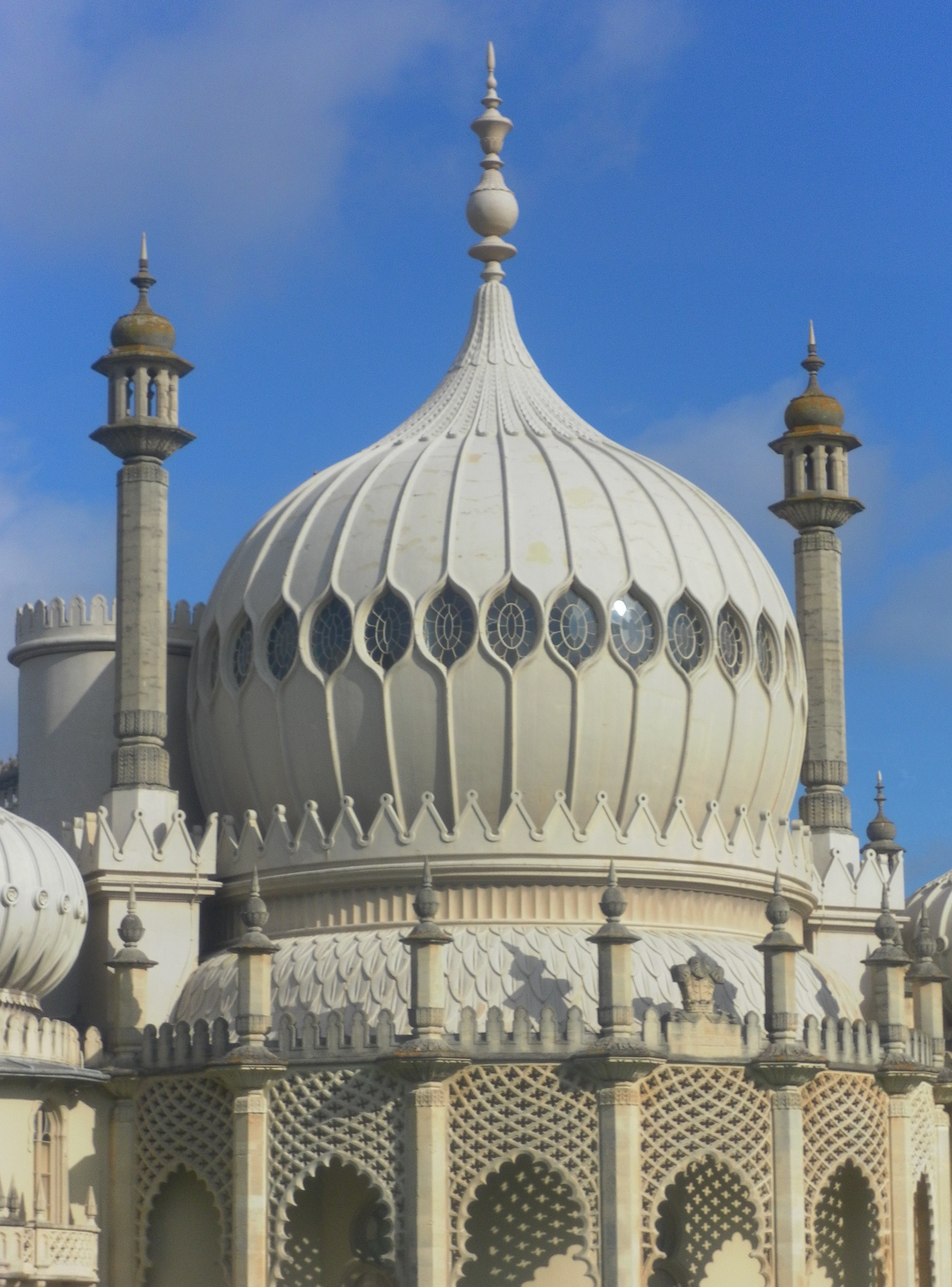
The "enchanting oriental humour of the Royal Pavilion" influenced subsequent architecture in Brighton and other seaside resorts.

Brighton and Hove, a city on the south-east coast of England, has a large and diverse stock of buildings "unrivalled architecturally" among the country's seaside resorts. The urban area is made up of the formerly separate towns of Brighton and Hove, nearby villages such as Portslade, Patcham and Rottingdean, and 20th-century estates such as Moulsecoomb and Mile Oak. As of 2013, the conurbation had a population of about 253,000. About half of the 20,430-acre (8,270 ha) geographical area is classed as built up.

Brighton's transformation from medieval fishing village into spa town and pleasure resort, patronised by royalty and fashionable high society, coincided with the development of Regency architecture and the careers of three architects whose work came to characterise the 4-mile (6.4 km) seafront. The previously separate village of Hove developed as a comfortable middle-class residential area "under a heavy veneer of [Victorian] suburban respectability": large houses spread rapidly across the surrounding fields during the late 19th century, although the high-class and successful Brunswick estate was a product of the Regency era. Old villages such as Portslade, Rottingdean, Ovingdean and Patcham, with ancient churches, farms and small flint cottages, became suburbanised as the two towns grew and merged, and the creation of "Greater Brighton" in 1928 brought into the urban area swathes of open land which were then used for housing and industrial estates. Many buildings were lost in the 1960s and 1970s, when Brighton's increasing regional importance encouraged redevelopment, but conservation movements were influential in saving other buildings.

Much of the city's built environment is composed of buildings of the Regency, Victorian and Edwardian eras. The Regency style, typical of the late 18th and early 19th centuries, is characterised by pale stuccoed exteriors with Classical-style mouldings and bay windows. Even the modest two-storey terraced houses which spread rapidly across the steeply sloping landscape in the mid-19th century display some elements of this style. Extensive suburban development in Hove and the north of Brighton in the late 19th and early 20th century displays architectural features characteristic of those eras, with an emphasis on decorative brickwork and gables. Postwar developments range from Brutalist commercial and civic structures to pastiches of earlier styles. Sustainable building techniques have become popular for individual houses and on a larger scale, such as at the long-planned New England Quarter brownfield development.

Local and national government have recognised the city's architectural heritage through the designation of listed building and conservation area status to many developments. Since 1969, 34 conservation areas have been created, covering areas of various sizes and eras; and more than 1,200 structures have listed status based on their "special architectural or historic interest".

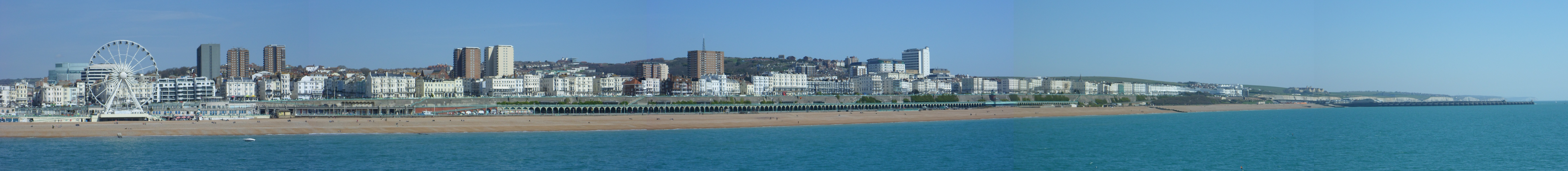
April 2013 panorama of the eastern side of Brighton seafront. Bring up the full-size image by clicking here; then explore using a mouse cursor and click on buildings and other features to go to their Wikipedia article or a close-up picture.

== Historical context ==
=== Early buildings ===
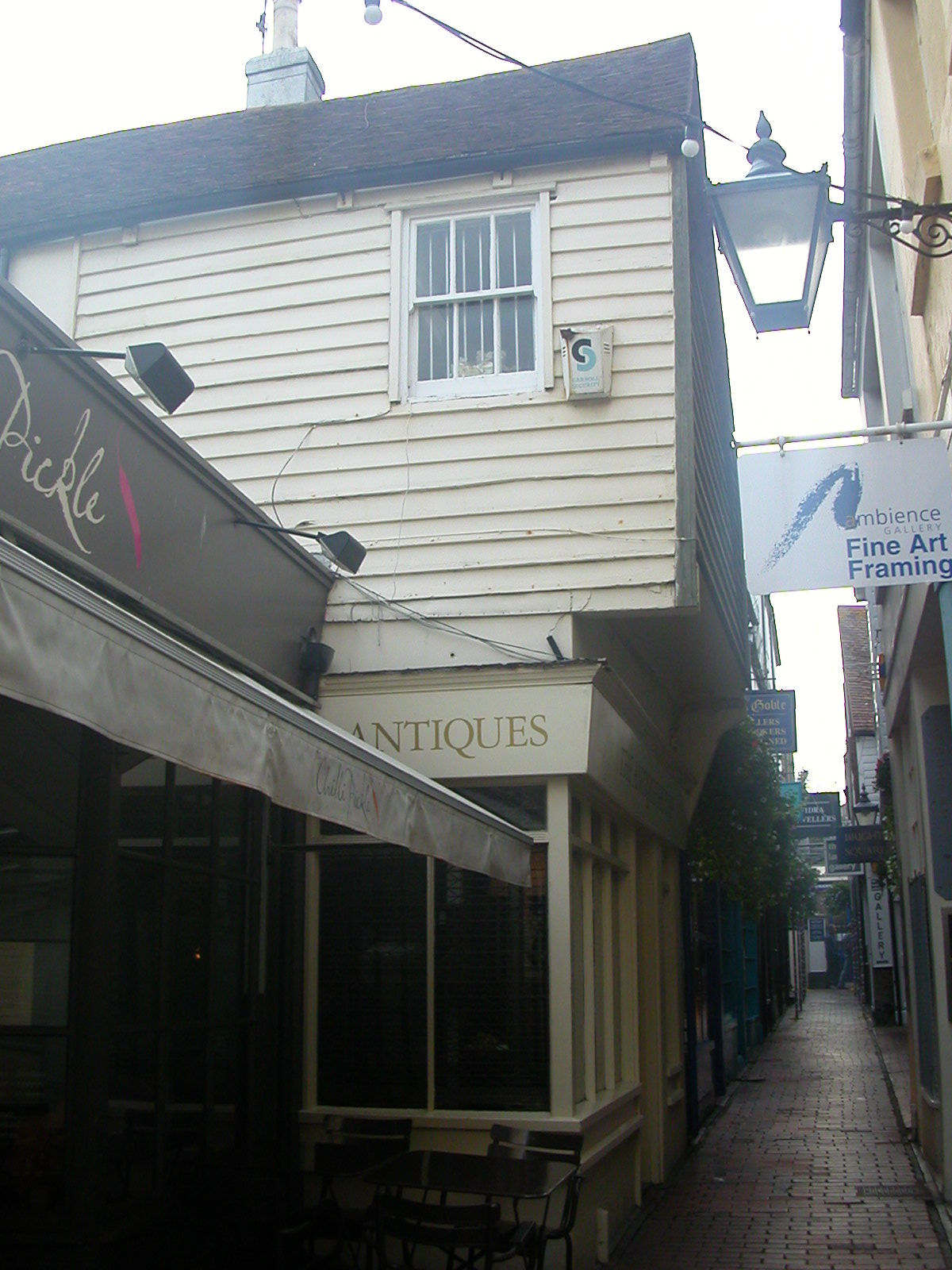
Buildings in The Lanes are small and tightly crowded. This weatherboarded and jettied example (43 Meeting House Lane) is one of the oldest.

Brighton was originally an agricultural and fishing village surrounded by fields. In the Saxon era, small buildings developed in an area bounded by four streets named after the points of the compass, and a church stood on higher ground inland. Modest cottages for the fishermen stood on the beach below the cliffs. The fishing industry contributed to the town's first period of growth in the 16th and 17th centuries, but development did not expand beyond the old boundaries. The industry contracted in the early 18th century, and depopulation occurred. Labour and land for redevelopment became cheaper and, because good communication routes were already established, the town was well-placed to grow rapidly again when sea-bathing became fashionable in the mid-18th century. Little pre-18th century architecture remains, although there are some individual buildings. For example, 27 King Street in North Laine is cobble-fronted and retains a timber-framed interior which could be 17th-century. Hove, meanwhile, was a single-street village with a manor house, some modest cottages and a church further inland. Although St Andrew's Church remains in use and Hove Street survives, the manor house was demolished in 1936 and no other original buildings remain.

Early-18th-century descriptions of the old town of Brighton concentrated on how small and low the houses were, and how the lower storeys were characteristically set slightly below ground level. This, and the proximity of the houses to each other, may have offered protection against storms and flooding from the sea. Huddling together may have also helped the houses survive; they were poorly built and had little structural integrity. Typical Lanes buildings are timber-framed and plastered with load-bearing walls of bungaroosh with some flint. Surviving examples can be seen at Bartholomews, Middle Street, and Ship Street, in the area now known as the Lanes.

Buildings of the 16th and 17th centuries and earlier can be found in the old villages absorbed by modern Brighton and Hove. At St Wulfran's Church, Ovingdean, the 12th-century nave and chancel replaced a Saxon structure. St Helen's Church at Hangleton retains 11th-century herringbone masonry and other ancient fabric. The old parish churches—All Saints, Patcham, St Nicolas's, Portslade, St Peter's, Preston, St Margaret's, Rottingdean, and St Nicholas's in Brighton—all retain some features from the 12th to 14th centuries, although they were all subject to Victorian restoration. Hove's oldest secular building is Hangleton Manor, which retains some 15th-century fabric. Other surviving manor houses and mansions in the old villages around Brighton and Hove include Preston Manor, Patcham Place, Stanmer House, Moulsecoomb Place and Ovingdean Grange, while Patcham and Rottingdean have well-preserved lesser houses such as Court House, Down House, Hillside and Southdown House, generally built of brick and flint in the 18th century.

=== Georgian and Regency periods ===
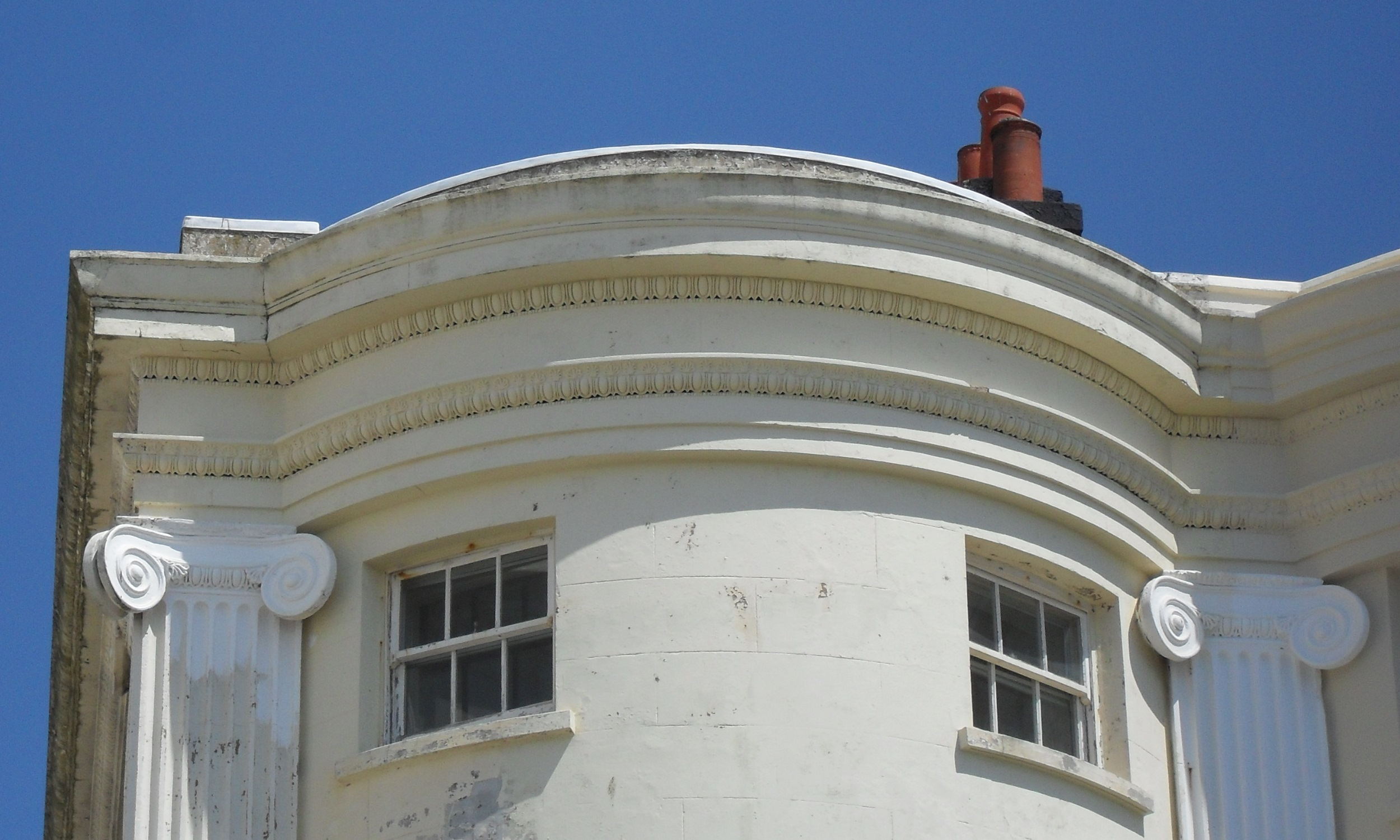
102 Marine Parade has such Regency-style features as a bow-fronted stuccoed façade, fluted Ionic pilasters, decorative capitals and a parapet.

The first development outside the four-street boundary of the ancient village was in 1771, when North Row (soon renamed Marlborough Place) was built to the west. Some tarred cobble-fronted buildings survive there. At the same time, inns were becoming established as fashionable venues: the Castle (demolished) and the Old Ship both had large assembly rooms for dancing and high-class socialising. The Castle's assembly rooms of 1754 were redesigned by John Crunden in 1776 in Classical style; (Note: The interior survives in altered form at the former St Stephen's Church in the Montpelier district, having been moved there in 1850–51.) in 1761 Robert Golden designed Palladian-style rooms for the Old Ship, later redecorated in a Robert Adamish style after Crunden's work at the Castle. Adam himself redesigned Marlborough House in 1786–1787: with its elegant Neo-Palladian façade and "spatially arresting interior", it has been called the finest house of its era in the city. Coaching inns became important in the late 18th century—there were many on North Street, but the only survivor is the former Clarence Hotel.

Prince George, the Prince Regent (later King George IV) visited Brighton regularly from 1783 and soon wanted a house. A building near the Castle Inn was found, and Henry Holland extended it in a Classical style from 1786. The Royal Marine Pavilion (later renamed the Royal Pavilion) became increasingly important in the growing town as it became the centre of activities for the Prince and his entourage—and the focal point for his regularly changing architectural tastes. Holland revamped the building from 1801 to 1804 in a Chinese style, and the French-inspired interior was changed as well. William Porden added a complex of stables (now the Brighton Dome complex) from 1804, in an Indian style. James Wyatt and later John Nash were commissioned to make further alterations; Nash's work, finished in 1823, gave the building its present opulent Indo-Saracenic Revival/Orientalist appearance.

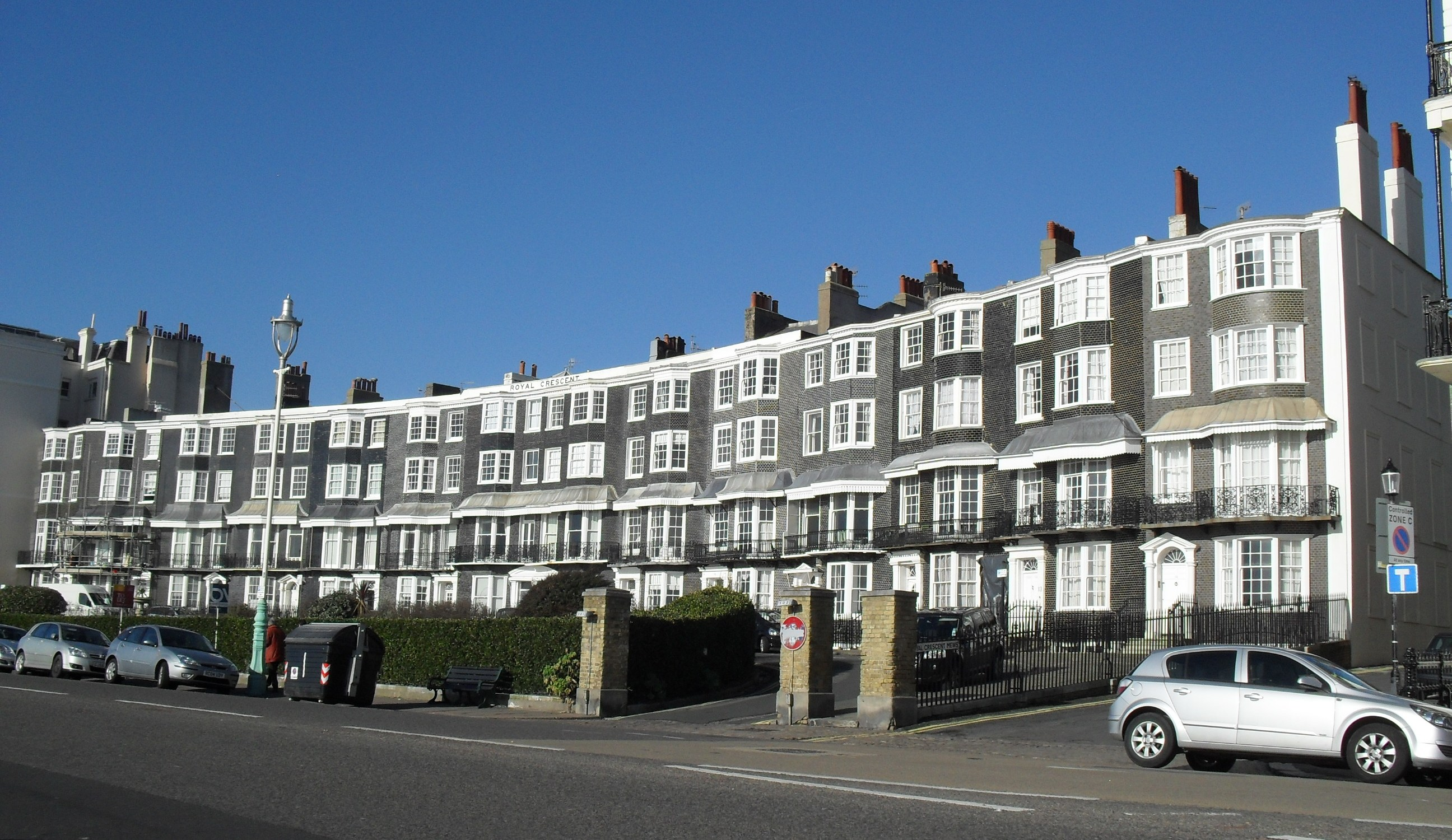
Royal Crescent was the first of many 19th-century crescents.

George's patronage helped Brighton become a fashionable, high-class resort. As it became more popular, it further outgrew its four-street boundaries. Planned development, as opposed to ad-hoc growth, started in the 1780s with North Parade and South Parade alongside Old Steine. By the 1790s it spread well to the east along the East Cliff: New Steine (1790–1795, but refaced in the 1820s) was the first sea-facing square, then came Bedford, Clarence and Russell Squares (all early 19th century) and Brighton's first crescent, Royal Crescent, in 1802. The father-and-son architects Amon and Amon Henry Wilds and their associate Charles Busby began working in the town from 1815, helping to develop the Regency style which now characterises the seafront. Hanover Crescent, Montpelier Crescent, Park Crescent, the Kemp Town estate (Sussex Square, Lewes Crescent, Arundel Terrace and Chichester Terrace) and Brunswick Town (Brunswick Terrace, Brunswick Square and associated streets) were among their set-piece developments. By the early 19th century, Brighton was renowned for its architecture. William Cobbett claimed in 1832 that it "certainly surpass[ed] in beauty all other towns in the world".

Around the same time, the first concerns were raised about the poor quality of houses on the edge of Brighton. Many reports were made over the next decades, but little action was taken. There was some slum clearance in 1845, when Queen's Road was driven through the Petty France and Durham districts to provide a direct link from the recently built railway station to the town centre.

=== Railway age and Victorian era ===
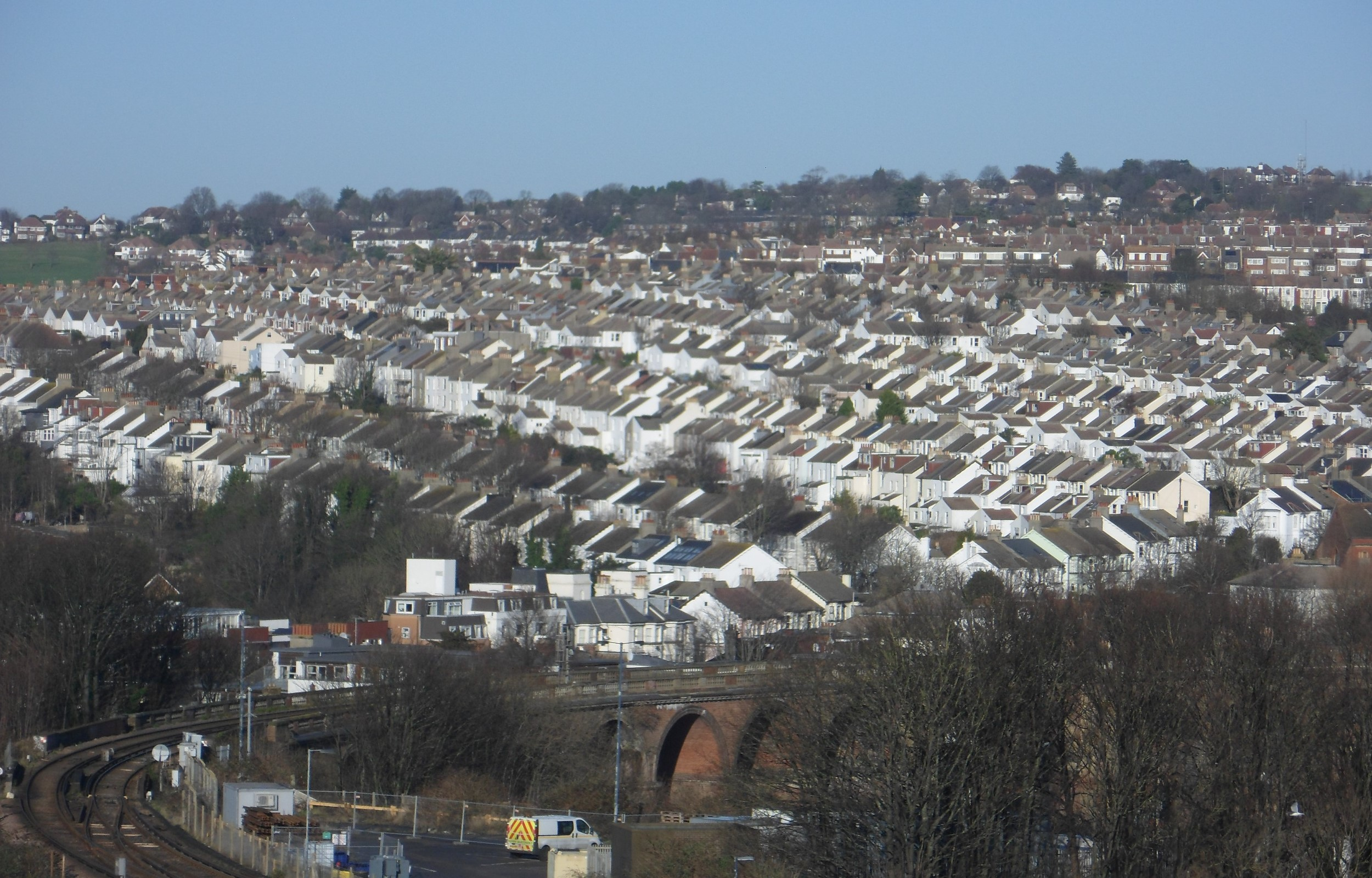
Vast swathes of housing covered the land north and east of Brighton after the railway was built. London Road Viaduct (pictured at the bottom) originally stood in open fields.

The London–Brighton railway reached the coast in 1841, and westward and eastward links were soon built from Brighton railway station, built in 1841 in Italianate style and added to in 1882. The line to the east crossed the 28-arch, 400-yard (370 m), sharply curved London Road Viaduct, which stood in empty fields when built in 1846.

Development had not yet reached this part of Brighton because the ancient field system to the north and east of the town constrained its growth, as did the Stanford family's ownership of most of the remaining land surrounding Brighton and Hove. They carefully controlled its sale and development, releasing parcels of land gradually and ensuring that visually cohesive planned estates of high-quality housing were built. The area's 19th- and early 20th-century housing accordingly has a clear pattern. The poorest housing was to the east of Brighton; working-class housing for tradesmen, railway workers and other artisans spread to the northeast around Lewes Road, the viaduct and the station; middle-class developments lay north of the centre around London Road; and the highest-quality suburbs developed to the northwest of Brighton and north of Hove on the Stanford family's land. As originally built, the inner suburbs were of variable architectural quality—small houses with very late Regency-style flourishes predominated, but scattered among these were small-scale industrial and commercial development, several Victorian churches such as St Bartholomew's, St Martin's and St Joseph's, and institutional buildings such as workhouses, hospitals and schools. Thomas Simpson, architect and surveyor to the local school board, built several school buildings, most of which survive with little alteration.

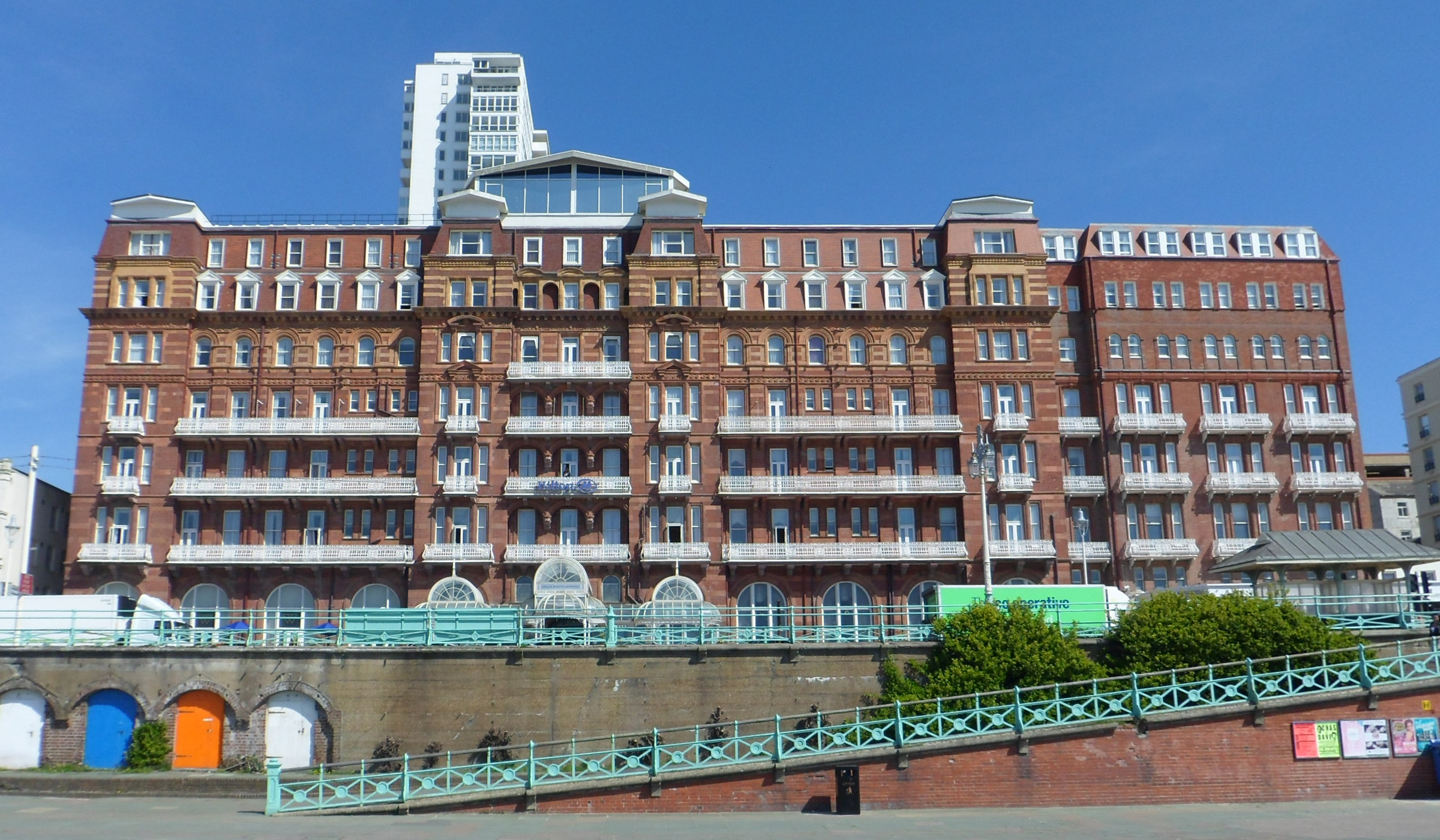
Alfred Waterhouse designed the Metropole Hotel in 1890.

The coming of the railway changed Brighton from an exclusive resort to a town popular with all classes of holidaymaker and permanent resident alike: the population grew by nearly fifty per cent in the first decade. The seafront remained the main attraction, so an array of features were added, including pleasure piers, promenades, hotels, entertainment kiosks and an aquarium. The West Pier and Palace Pier date from 1863 and 1891 respectively; Madeira Drive was laid out in 1872 and received its distinctive cast-iron terrace in the 1890s; Kings Road was widened in the 1880s; and large hotels began to line it even before this. Early-19th-century hotels such as the Royal Albion, Royal York and Bedford were joined by the Italianate Grand (1864) and Norfolk (1865). In 1890, Alfred Waterhouse built the Metropole, featuring a prominent red-brick and terracotta façade. Its deliberately different design caused shock and brought criticism, but The British Architect considered it "a wonderful relief". Brighton's architecture began to reflect wider trends in Britain, but the Regency style and the Royal Pavilion's onion domes and minarets continued to hold some local influence, particularly on the seafront.

Hove also developed rapidly but its influences were different. Although the Brunswick estate was successful, development of the neighbouring Adelaide Crescent stalled for more than 20 years. Next came Palmeira Square (c. 1855–1865), where the evolution from Regency to Victorian Italianate is clear, and there was some suburban development around the new Hove railway station in the 1860s, but land to the north and was retained by the Stanford estate until 1872. Over the following 30 years, Hove developed into a spacious, suburban town. The architects were James Knowles and Henry Jones Lanchester, and William Willett built the gault brick villas they designed. Next came H. B. Measures and Amos Faulkner, who introduced more architectural variety and preferred red brick; then local architects Thomas Lainson and Clayton & Black laid out further estates of tree-lined avenues and half-timbered houses in the Queen Anne Revival and Domestic Revival styles. Public buildings included Hove Town Hall (1882; demolished 1966), a public library (1907–08) and a museum and gallery. Gothic Revival churches of this era include Central United Reformed Church (1867), the Sacred Heart (1880) and Holy Trinity (1863).

=== Early 20th century ===
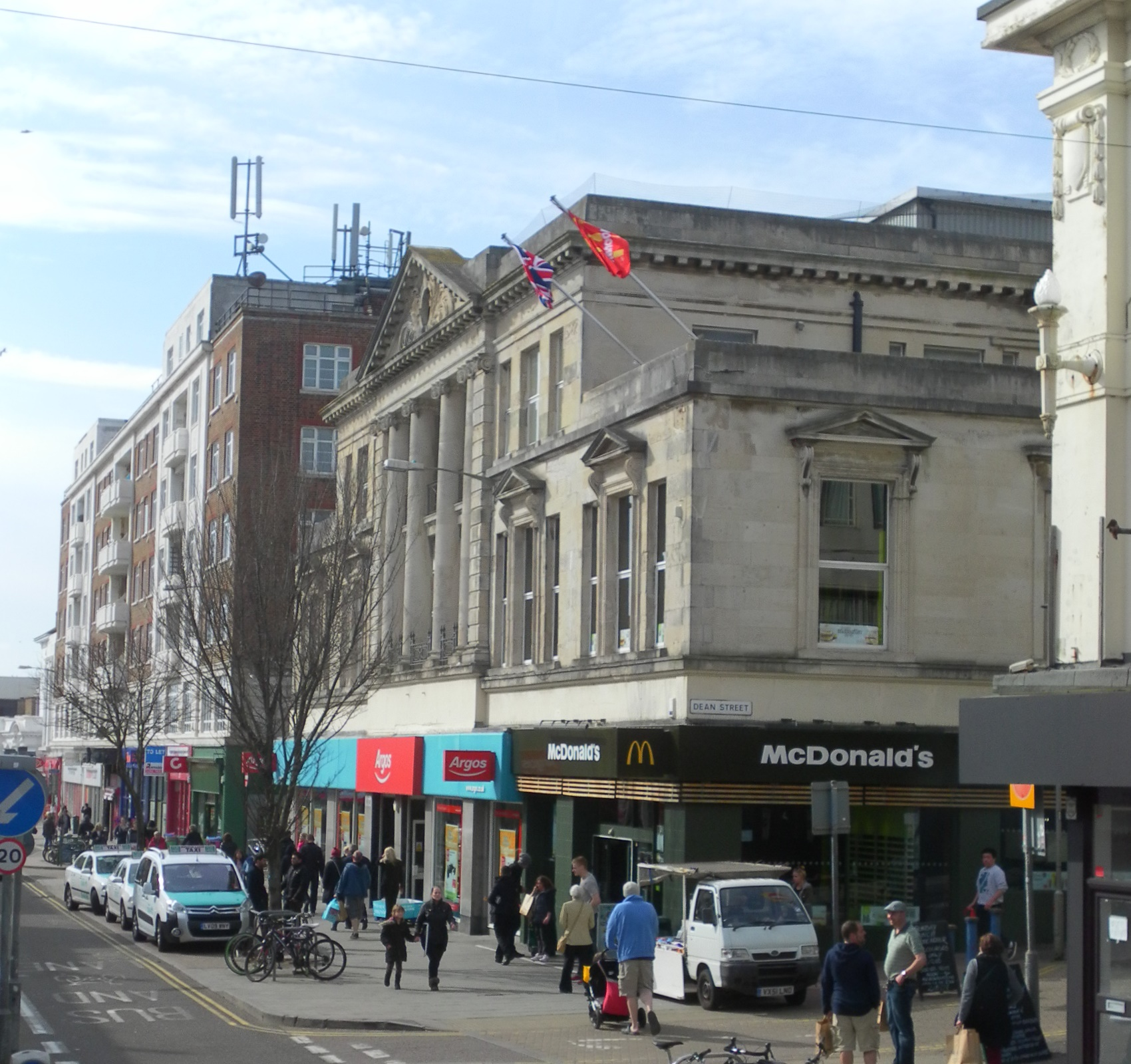
Western Road was redeveloped with new commercial buildings in the 1930s.

Residential growth continued in the interwar and postwar periods, and the distinctive zonal pattern of development continued. Middle-class residential housing developed to the north in the Patcham and Preston areas; and suburbs such as Westdene, Withdean, Tongdean and West Blatchington to the northwest of Brighton and the north of Hove had an upper middle-class character. The rapid interwar suburban growth was similar to that seen throughout south-east England, particularly stimulated by improvements to railway connections to London, which increased the attractiveness of commuting. Slum clearances were undertaken in the 1930s. Council housing was built east and northeast of Brighton—Moulsecoomb and the Pankhurst Avenue area near Queen's Park, both started in the early 1920s, were the first council estates. In South Moulsecoomb, 478 houses were initially built, on 94 acres (38 ha), along garden city lines. North Moulsecoomb's 390 houses, at a much higher density, followed from 1926. Brighton's first council flats were the four-storey Milner (1934) and Kingswood (1938) blocks in Carlton Hill.

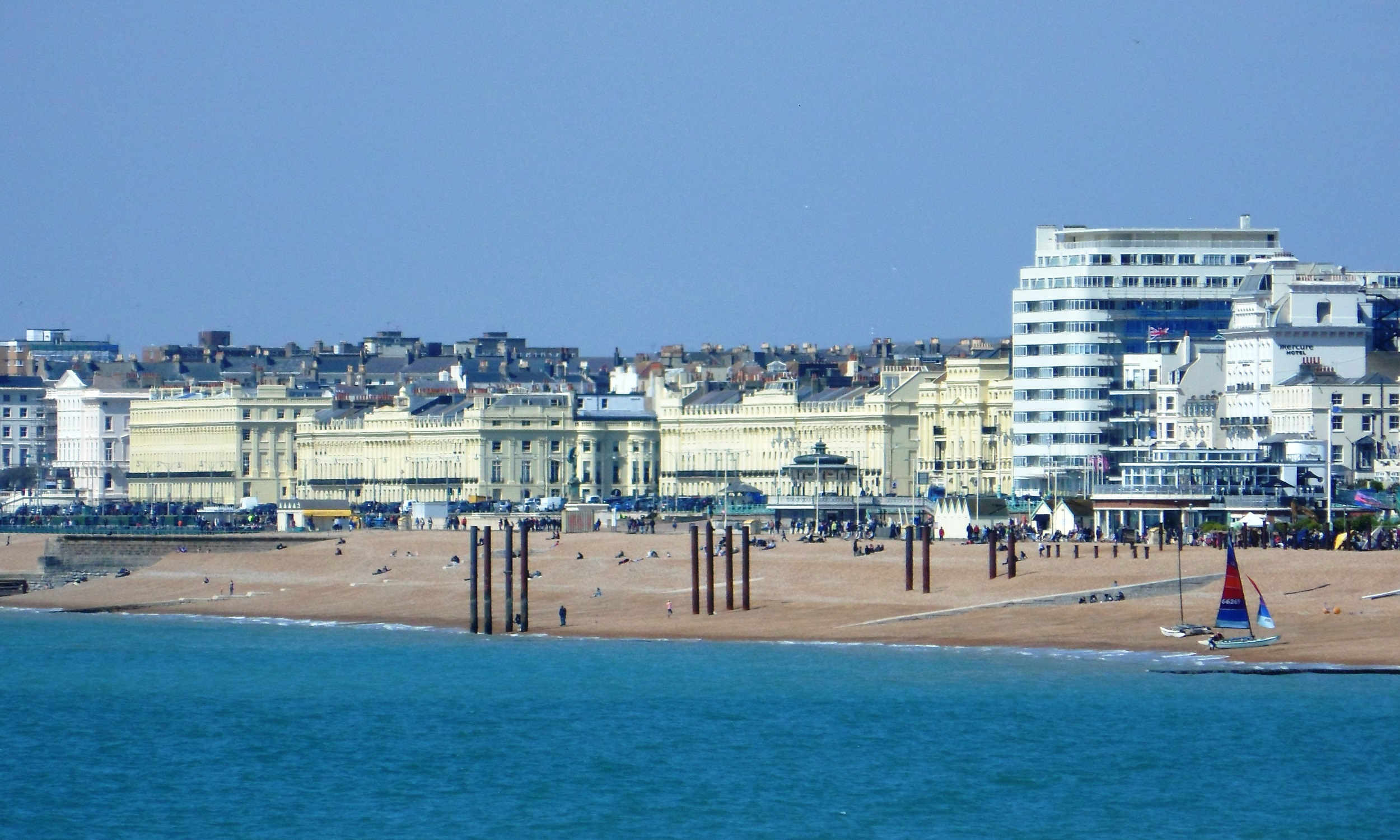
Herbert Carden wanted Brighton and Hove's Regency-style buildings to be replaced with Modernist flats in the style of Embassy Court (far right).

Several streets in the centre of Brighton were widened in the 1920s and 1930s in an effort to improve traffic flow, resulting in the demolition of many 19th-century buildings. Wells Coates designed Embassy Court, a block of luxury flats, completed in 1935. Praise from the Architects' Journal was matched by Alderman Sir Herbert Carden, who campaigned for the entire seafront to be replaced with similar Modernist structures. Carden also proposed to replace the Royal Pavilion with a conference centre, a move which encouraged the formation of the Regency Society, the first of many local conservation groups.

In the same era, Brighton's leisure industry continued to expand, and many entertainment venues were built, some in the fashionable Art Deco style: among them were the Savoy (later ABC) and Regent cinemas and the Astoria and Imperial theatres. Also in the Art Deco style were the Saltdean Lido and the Black Rock swimming pool. The Dome and Brighton Aquarium both underwent Art Deco modifications. The local architect John Leopold Denman designed many new buildings in Neo-Georgian style. Most were for commercial use—such as 20–22 Marlborough Place and the newspaper offices at 2–3 Pavilion Buildings—but the Hounsom Memorial Church at Hangleton and the Downs Crematorium are also his. The latter may have been inspired by Harry Stuart Goodhart-Rendel's nearby St Wilfrid's Church. Goodhart-Rendel, a native of Brighton, produced Princes House, featuring patterned brickwork over a steel frame. Several of its neighbouring buildings are by Denman or the Clayton & Black firm.

=== Postwar ===
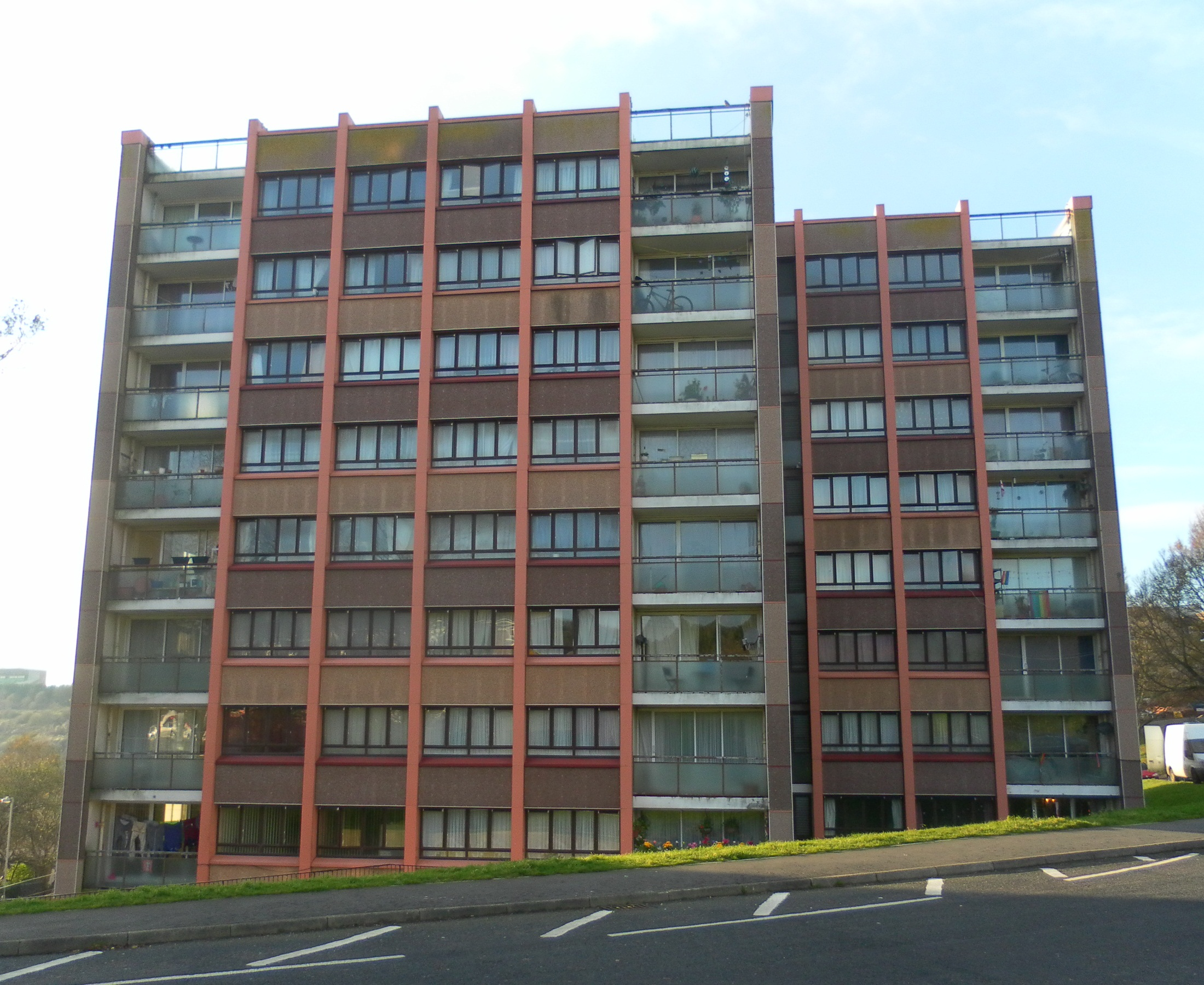
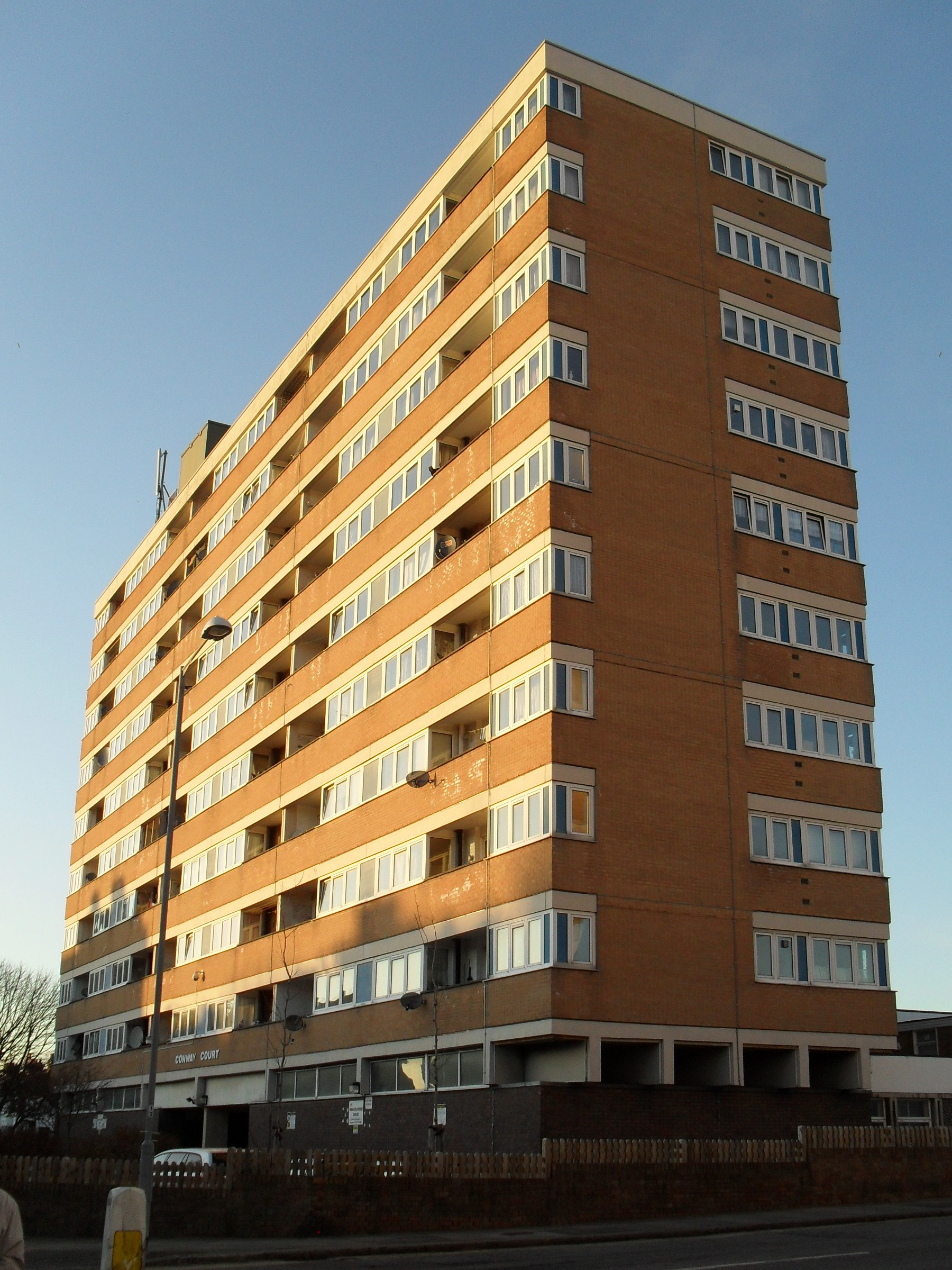
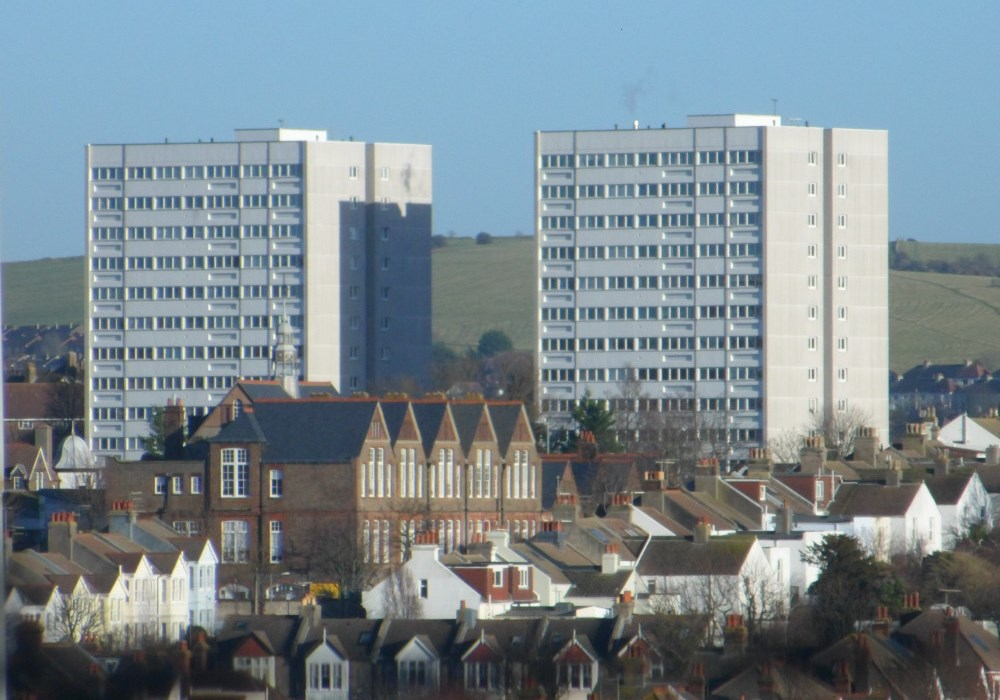
Council flats of the 1960s include (left to right) the Swanborough Flats, Conway Court and the Hollingdean Flats (Nettleton Court and Dudeney Lodge).

The urban area was not as badly affected by World War II bombing as some coastal towns, including nearby Eastbourne, but some buildings were damaged or destroyed. London Road Viaduct suffered a direct hit to its central arched; the replacement brickwork is still visible. St Cuthman's Church was destroyed in 1943.

The first four council-owned tower blocks were built on Albion Hill and date from 1961. Five more were built in Kemptown in the mid-1960s. Nettleton Court and Dudeney Lodge towers in Hollingdean date from 1966 and four ten-storey blocks, Swanborough Flats, were built in Whitehawk in 1967. Meanwhile, Hove had a high proportion of multi-occupancy houses. Thousands lived in small bedsits, and a report in 1976 estimated that 11,000 people lived in substandard housing. Given the lack of open land to build on, redevelopment was championed. Based on Herbert Carden's pre-war suggestion, the council proposed to replace Brunswick Square, Brunswick Terrace, and Adelaide Crescent with tower blocks but public opposition was too great. From 1966, 300 slum houses in the Conway Street area were replaced with several tower blocks on an 11-acre (4.5 ha) site near the station. In 2025, surveys of eight tower blocks in Kemptown, Hollingdean and Whitehawk revealed structural issues which compromised their safety. The city council announced in October 2026 that the blocks would be demolished and residents rehoused, although demolition work would not start for at least seven years.

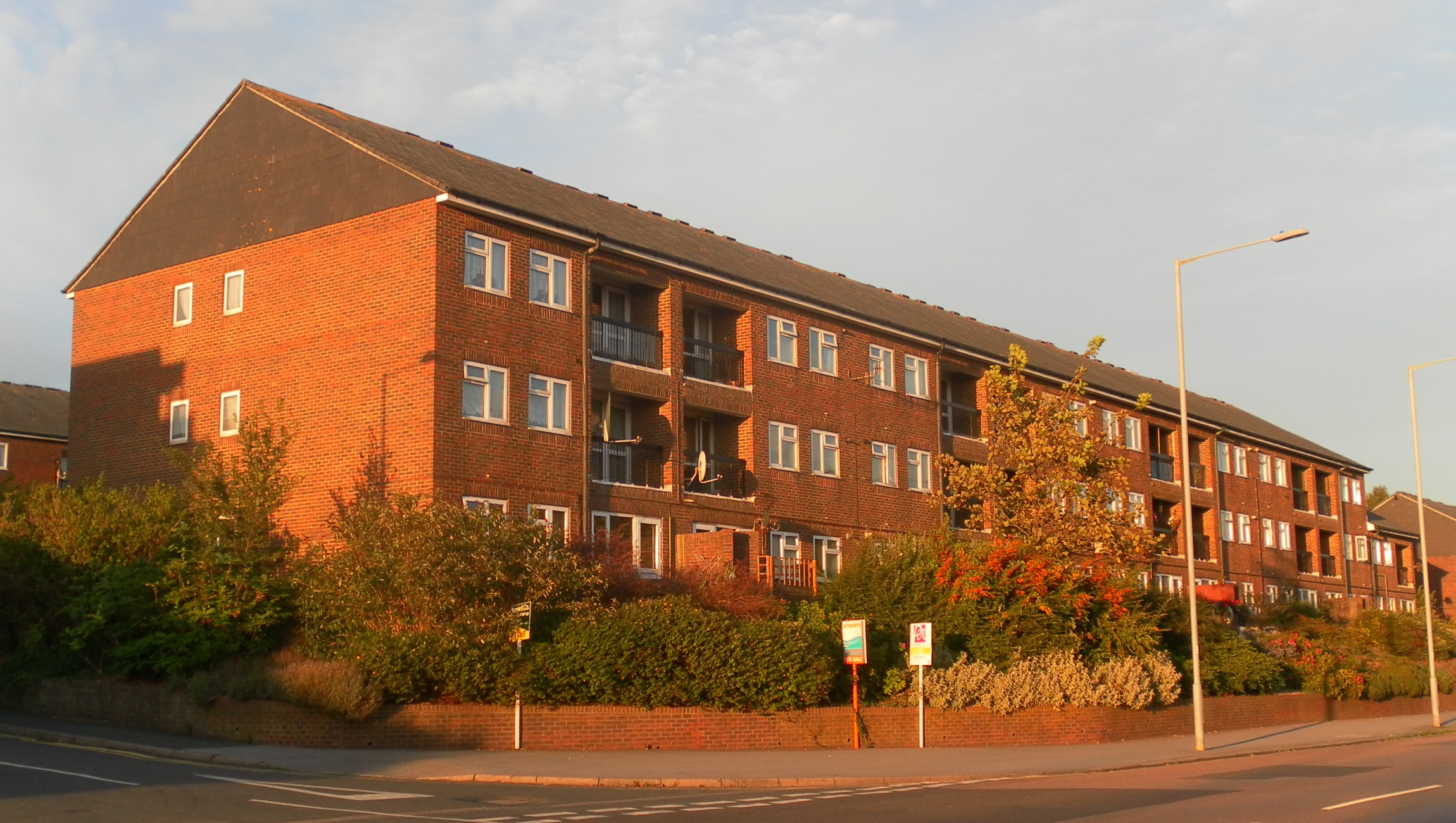
Low-rise council flats were preferred in the 1970s (Ingram Crescent, Hove pictured).

In the 1970s, the councils' emphasis changed towards densely packed low-rise flats such as Hampshire Court (Kemptown) and Ingram Crescent (Hove). Nonetheless, private firms continued to build towers into the 1980s, especially in Hove. Two of the tallest privately built blocks, Chartwell Court and Sussex Heights (the latter, at 334 feet (102 m), is Sussex's tallest tower block), sit on top of Brighton's largest postwar redevelopment scheme—the Churchill Square shopping centre. This 11-acre (4.5 ha) development by Russell Diplock & Associates (1963–68) has been condemned in the Pevsner Architectural Guides as "a disaster architecturally", owing to its scale and poor relationship to surrounding buildings. It was rebuilt as a covered shopping mall from 1995. Most other postwar schemes amounted to small-scale infill. Brighton Square, a new pedestrian shopping square in the heart of The Lanes, dates from 1966 and is in harmony with its surroundings in terms of scale and architecture. Elsewhere in The Lanes, Postmodern Regency-style pastiche architecture characterises schemes at Nile Street (1987) and Duke's Lane (1979). A large site between Middle Street and West Street is covered by Avalon, a curvaceous double-fronted block of flats (2006).

The largest redevelopment scheme in the city since Churchill Square, started in 2007, was the New England Quarter mixed-use area on the site formerly occupied by Brighton railway works and Brighton station's car park. The early buildings are mostly residential but a second phase of building, with retail buildings integrated with residential blocks under the name One Brighton, is more distinctive. BioRegional and the World Wide Fund for Nature's "One Planet Living" design principles were used to ensure the development was sustainable. The Pevsner Architectural Guides describe the best building as a residential block which comes to a sharp point at an acute road junction. Sustainable design also informs smaller developments around the city including the Atlanta Apartments (2007) in Bevendean, the Sea Saw Self-Build scheme in Whitehawk (1993), the Hedgehog Housing development at Bevendean (2000), and a scheme for the South London Family Housing Association at Hollingdean (1988).

== Architectural characteristics ==
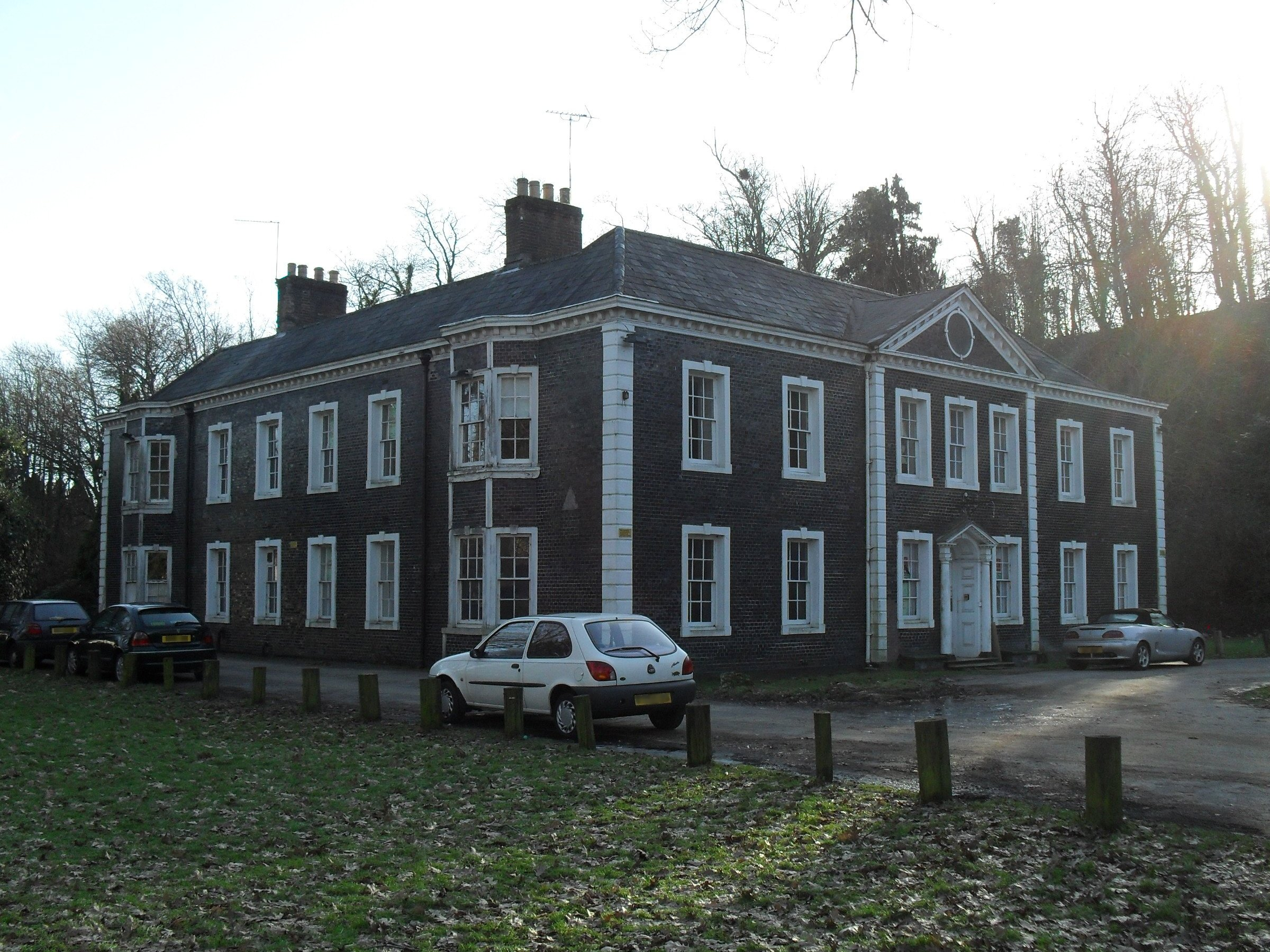
Black glazed mathematical tiles, as at Patcham Place, are a distinctive local feature.

Since the present urban area's settlements first developed, the local architecture has been influenced by characteristic styles and the use of materials rarely seen elsewhere. Black glazed mathematical tiles and bungaroosh are unique to Brighton and its immediate surroundings; tarred cobblestones with brick quoins, salt-glazed brickwork and knapped or plain flints were also common in early buildings. Stucco—perfectly suited to seaside conditions—predominated throughout the 19th century. Bay windows, a common feature of seaside resorts, were treated distinctively; balconies, sometimes roofed, were included on most 19th-century houses; Victorian and Edwardian houses were often designed as villas, with elaborate porches and decorative gables; and terraced housing is prevalent. The Regency style was so popular and influential that it persisted much longer than in other places, while Gothic Revival is almost absent in secular buildings, although the style was popular for 19th-century churches.

=== Building materials ===
Bungaroosh, a low-quality composite material, was commonly used in construction in the 18th century. The material contained miscellaneous objects such as broken bricks, lumps of wood, pebbles and stone; this mixture was then shuttered in hydraulic lime until it hardened. Bungaroosh walls were often hidden behind stucco or mathematical tile façades, and are susceptible to water penetration. Mathematical tiles, a similarly localised material, were designed to be laid overlapping each other, giving the appearance of brickwork. Glazed black tiles are closely associated with Brighton, and survive on 18th- and early 19th-century buildings such as Royal Crescent, Patcham Place and the shop at 9 Pool Valley. Other colours of tile are occasionally seen, such as cream (in the East Cliff area) and honey. The tiles gave bungaroosh buildings an expensive-looking façade and were easier to work with than bricks.

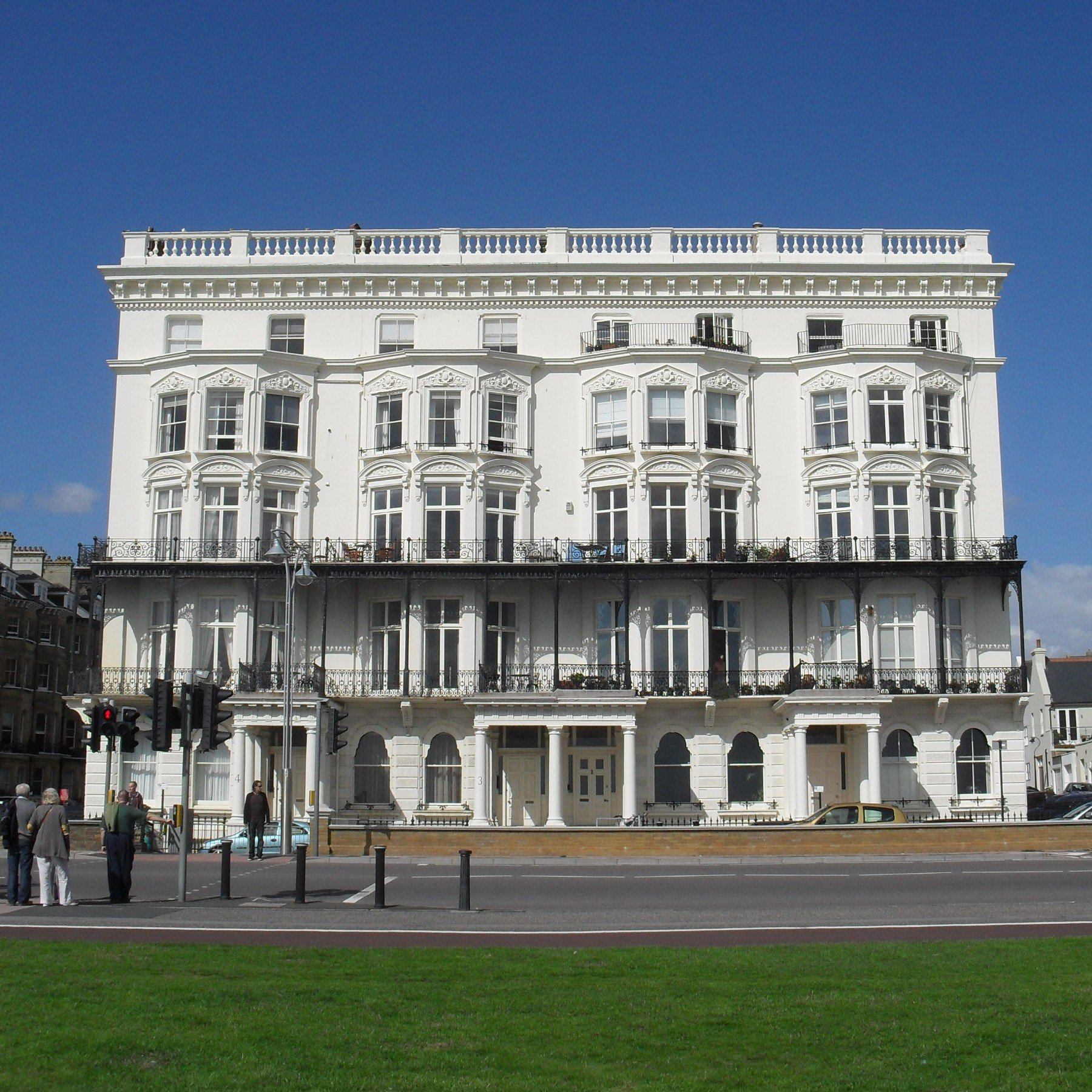
Many 19th-century buildings have stuccoed façades (Adelaide Mansions pictured).

Rendered stucco façades are characteristic of Brighton and Hove. Stucco gave the appearance of stone, left a smooth finish and could be worked into intricate patterns. It was used prominently on long terraces, such as in the Brunswick and Kemp Town estates. Rustication was sometimes used, especially at ground-floor level. Typical decorative mouldings include Classical features such as columns, pilasters, parapets, cornices, and capitals. Stucco façades were not always well-regarded—Louis Francis Salzman wrote in 1940 that stucco "produces dull uniformity, entirely lacking in character".

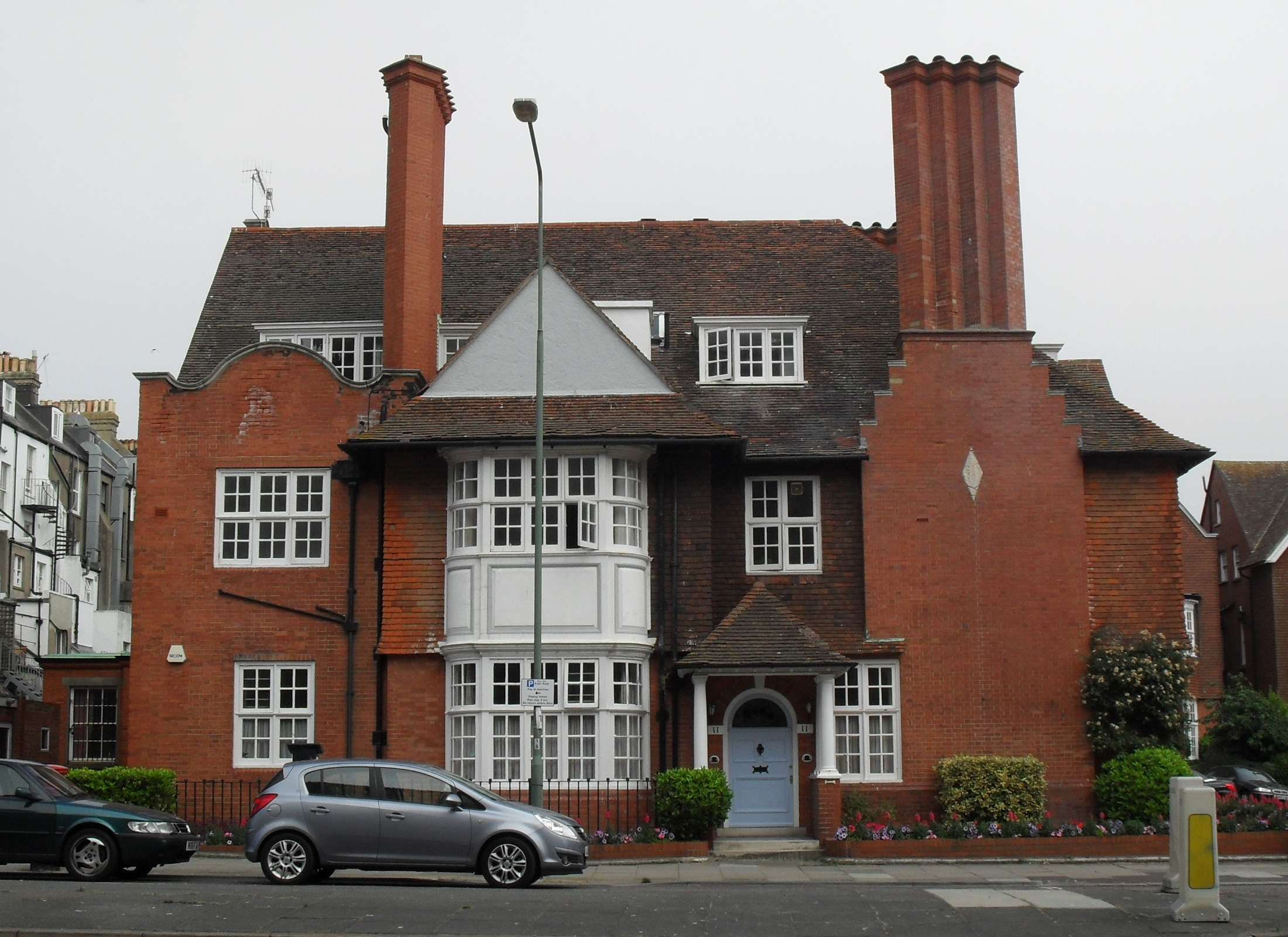
Brick was often used for 19th-century houses, for both walls and chimney-stacks (11 Grand Avenue, Hove pictured).

Brick buildings are common throughout the area. Pale gault brick is characteristic of some mid-19th-century residential developments, such as the area around Grand Avenue in Hove and Valley Gardens in Brighton. Later in the century, smooth red brickwork became more common. Yellowish stock bricks were popular in the 19th century for non-residential buildings and walls which were not readily visible. Different coloured bricks, such as brown and grey-blue, were often used in quoins and dressings on walls made of flint or red bricks. The Flemish bond is the most common brickwork style in the city. On Victorian and Edwardian houses, brick chimney-stacks often served a decorative as well as functional purpose, and were sometimes tall and ornate, such as at 8–11 Grand Avenue, Hove (1903).

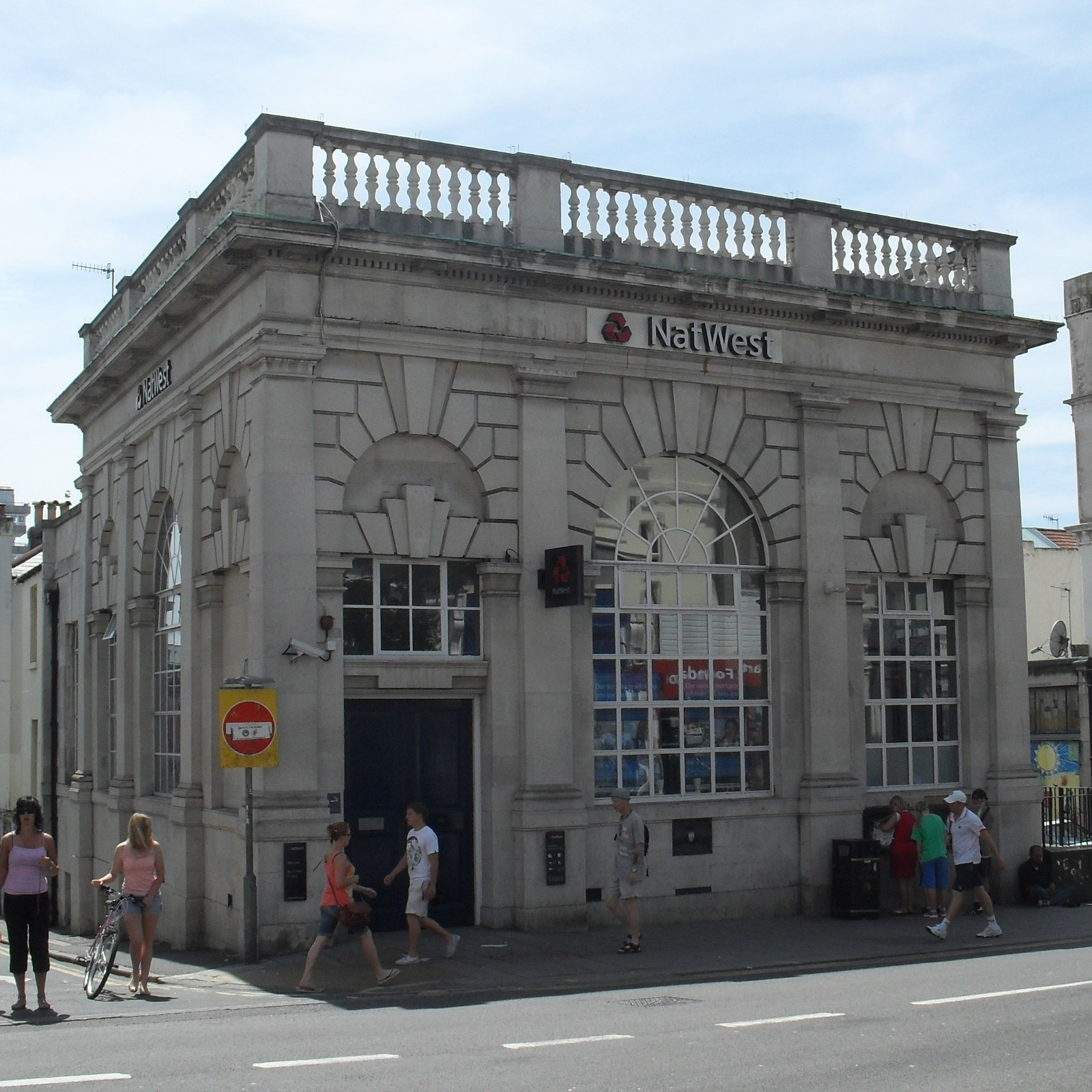
Some banks, such as T.B. Whinney's NatWest branch of 1905, (Note: This closed in 2013. Planning permission was sought in 2014 to convert the building into an ice cream parlour.) are stone-built.

Stone was rarely used as a building material, as it was not prevalent locally. Some churches and banks of the 19th and early 20th centuries were built of Bath or Portland stone, and Kentish ragstone was used for St Joseph's Church on Elm Grove, but few ordinary buildings have any stonework. Artificial stone was sometimes used for features such as cornices and columns, especially during the Victorian era. Flint was readily available and historically was a common building material. Agricultural buildings and cottages used random (unknapped) flintwork extensively, as did the ancient parish churches. Flints were collected from the beach and the South Downs or dug out of the fields, where they were often found near the surface. It became popular again as a building material in the early 19th century, by which time several styles had developed: rounded pebbles in seafront buildings, whole flints in rural cottages and agricultural buildings, knapped (split) flints, and random flintwork with brick dressings. The use of stone or brick quoins and dressings on flint walls, necessary for structural reasons, enhances the appearance of such buildings. Knapped flint was used particularly in farmhouses in nearby villages which later became part of the urban area. An old "Brighton Vernacular" style has been identified, involving cobblestone walls laid in courses with windows and doors edged with red brickwork. Many examples of this style were demolished during the mid 20th-century slum clearance programmes.

Weatherboarding is uncommon, but there are several examples at Stanmer and Patcham and in Meeting House Lane in The Lanes. Nearby, 37a Duke Street—the oldest building on that road—is a late 18th-century house with a façade of painted wooden blocks imitating stonework. Timber framing is also rare in the city, but features in modern self-build schemes at Sea Saw Way, Whitehawk (1993) and Hogs Edge, Bevendean (1997). Waste House, a conceptual sustainable building within the University of Brighton Faculty of Arts campus, was completed in 2014. The project, which uses waste destined for landfill, attempts to show how unwanted materials can be used to create a viable and energy-efficient building.

Concrete and steel framing became common in the 20th century and was used for the new Hove Town Hall and Brighton's police station and courthouse. (Note: This is a locally listed building.) Amex House, a corporate headquarters in Carlton Hill, was the first building in Britain to use glass-reinforced plastic. The New England Quarter features many buildings clad in an elastomeric render with timber cladding and large areas of glass.

=== Structural and decorative features ===
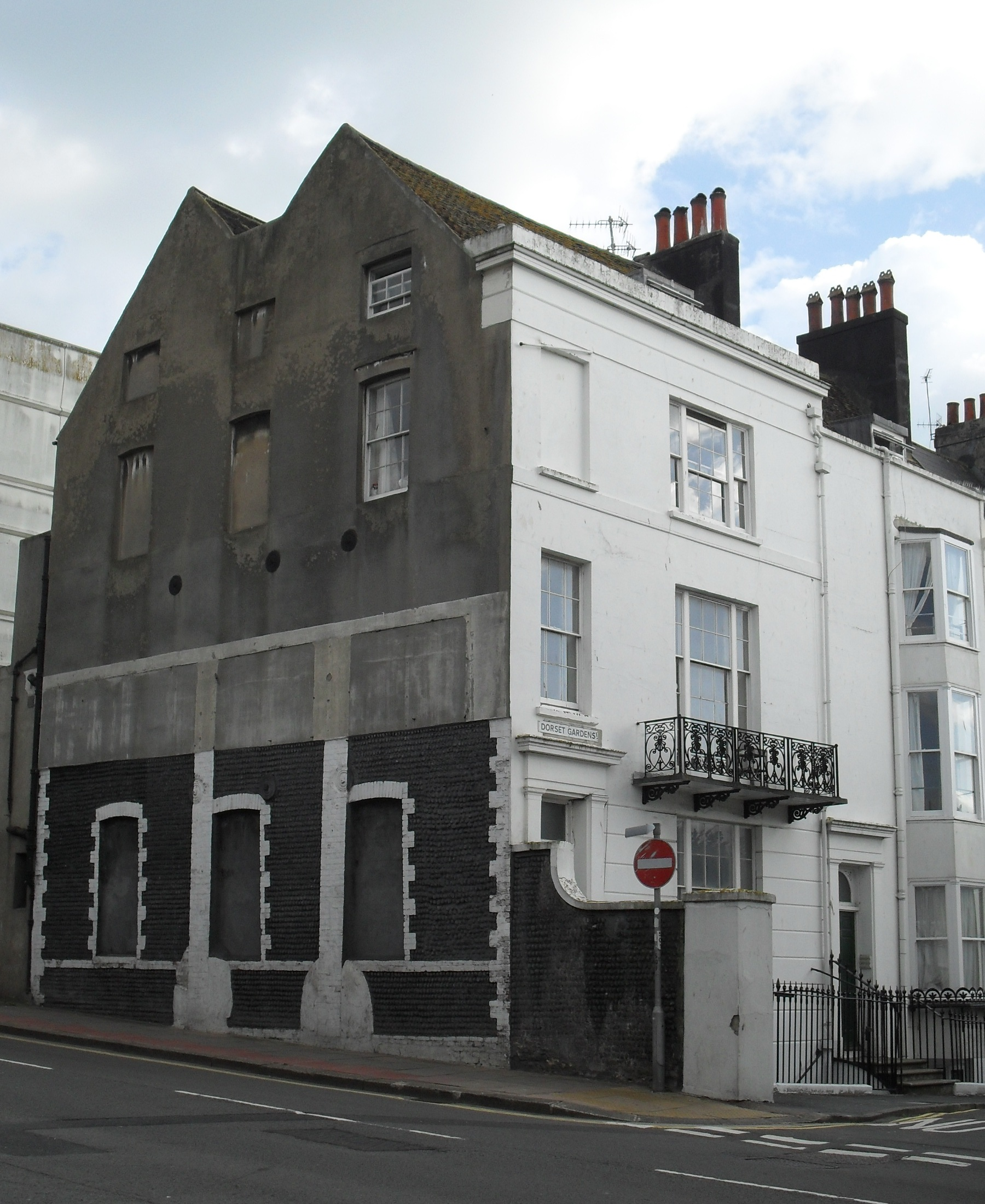
Butterfly roofs, rustication, cast iron balconies and prominent mouldings—all shown here at 1 Dorset Gardens—are common features in Brighton and Hove.

Many of the city's old buildings have butterfly roofs—double-pitched, with a central depression between the slopes. The oldest roofs tended to be laid with handmade clay tiles; slate tiles and mass-produced clay tiles were popular later. Elaborately decorated gables characterise the roofs of many houses and villas of the Victorian and Edwardian eras, especially in suburban areas; curved and shaped gables are uncommon.

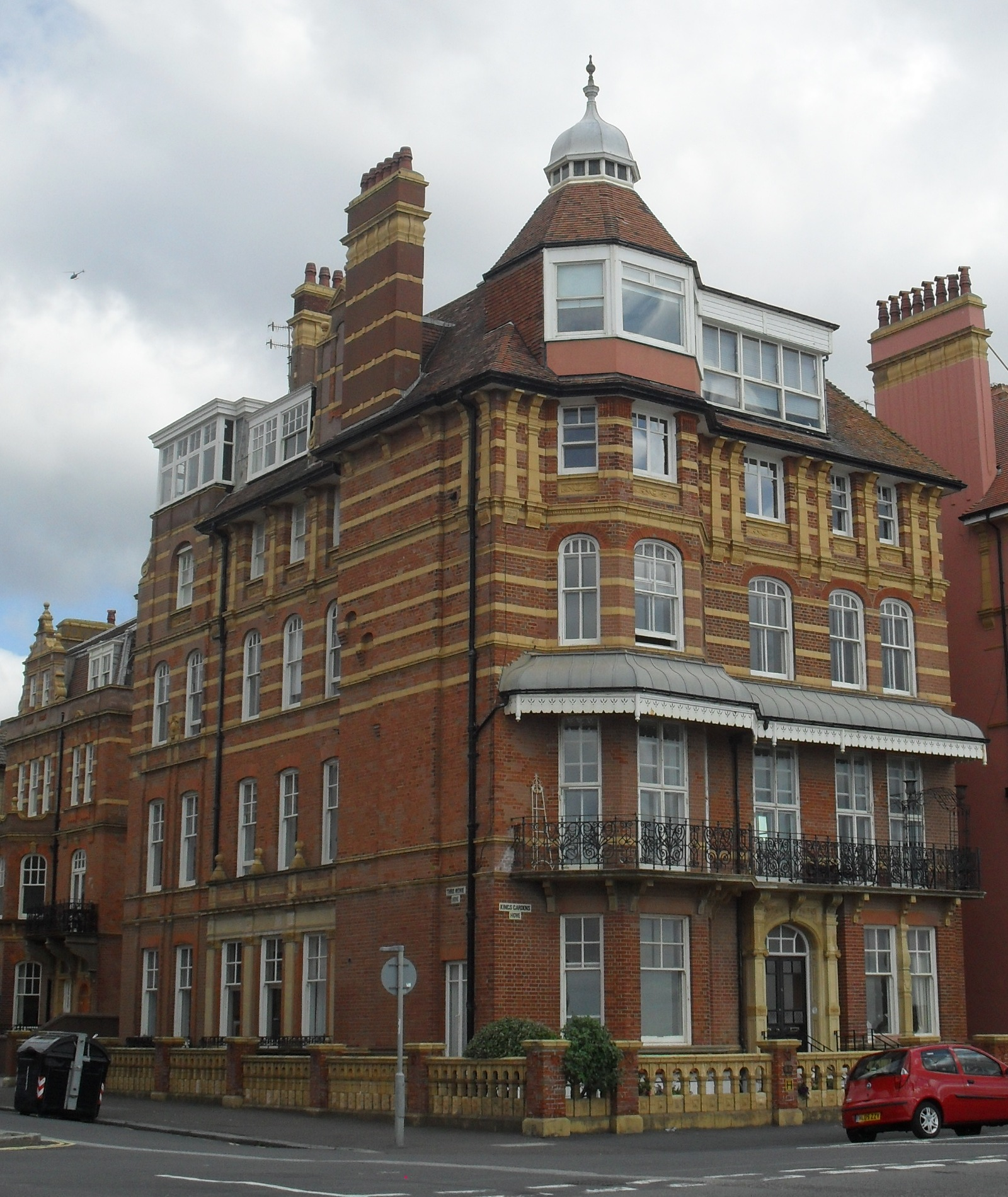
Buildings decorated with yellow faience include 4 King's Gardens, Hove.

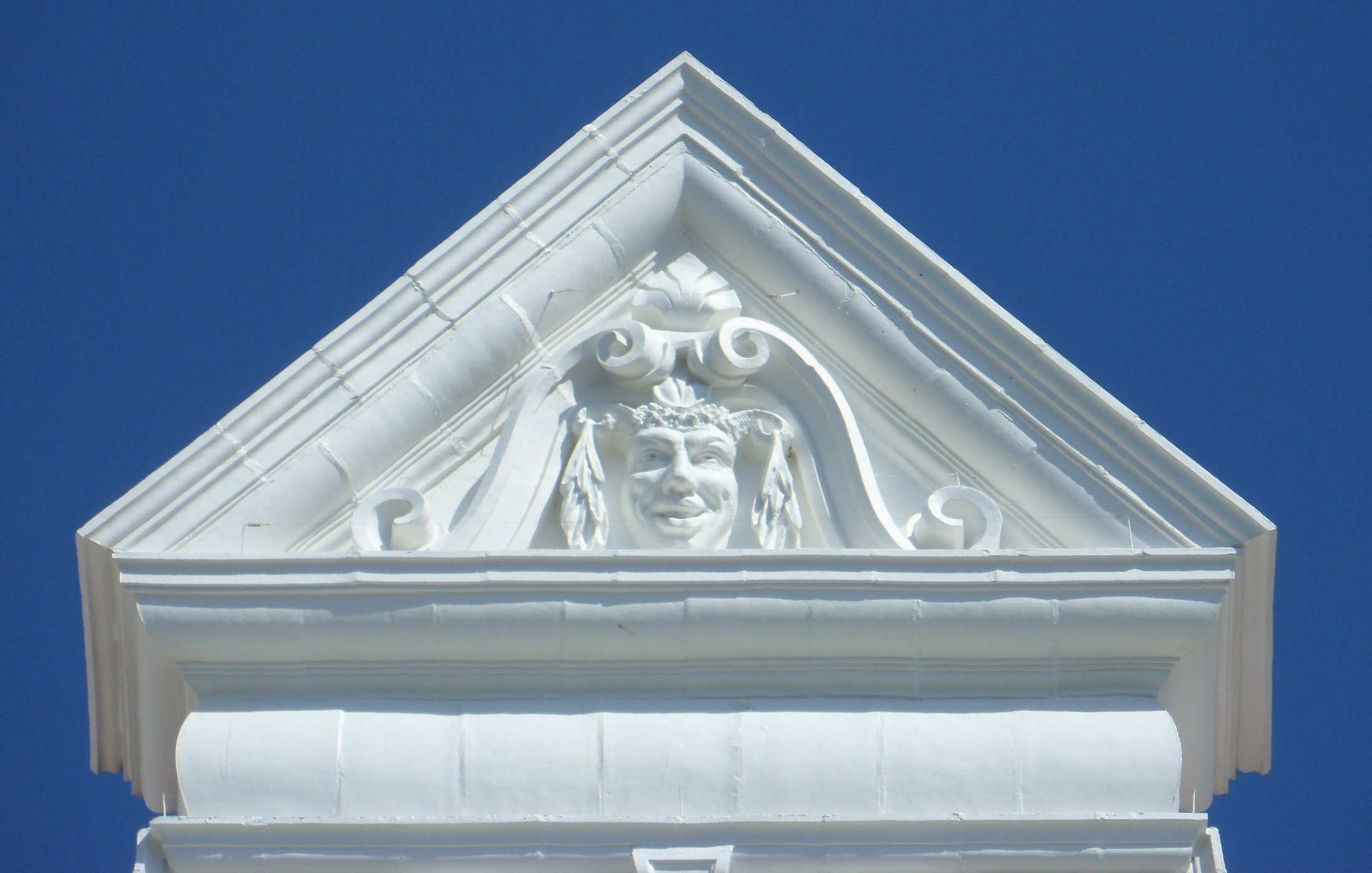
This gable at the former Belgrave Hotel on Brighton seafront has ornate mouldings.

Bow or bay windows were common on Brighton's early houses. Vertical sliding timber-framed sash windows with glazing bars were usually inserted into these, although casements were infrequently used. Casements were sometimes given glazing bars, which were usually slim and had mouldings in various patterns. The combination of partly recessed sashes and bow windows is characteristic of the Regency era. The Queen Anne Revival-style housing popular in Hove in the late 19th century had its own pattern of two-part sash windows with many panes on the upper section, separated by wider glazing bars. Casement windows were popular on interwar Tudor Revival houses, as at Woodland Drive in West Blatchington and steel-framed Crittall windows are found in interwar Modernist buildings such as Embassy Court and the Moderne-style mansion flats at 4 Grand Avenue.

Elaborate doorcases and porticos with Classical-style details are seen on many 19th-century houses, especially those built in the Regency era. A typical form consisted of two columns with decorative mouldings, an entablature and a straight roof, all stuccoed, supporting a cast-iron balcony. Suburban villas often feature brick and timber porches with gabled tiled roofs. In central areas, many old houses have been converted into shops and have lost their original doorways in favour of glazed shopfronts.

Balconies and canopied verandas are often seen on larger Regency- and Victorian-era houses in central Brighton and Hove. Typically at first-floor level, made of Portland stone or lead-coated timber and surrounded by cast iron railings with elaborate patterns, they sometimes span entire terraces of houses. They were provided to extend the living space of the drawing room, considered the most important room in the house for socialising during that era; accordingly they extended some way beyond the ground floor. Many terraces and squares faced central gardens or the sea, so balconies would give uninterrupted views of these. Queen Anne Revival and Arts and Crafts-style villas of the late 19th and early 20th centuries, especially in Hove and around Preston Park, featured wooden balconies with simple balustrades formed of upright timbers.

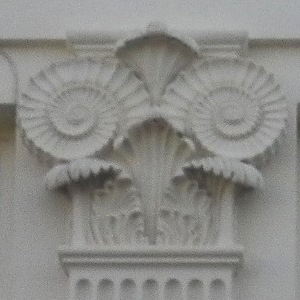
Ammonite capitals were often used by Amon Henry Wilds.

Mouldings of various types were common external decorative features in the 18th and 19th centuries, especially on Regency-style buildings. Many structural elements would typically feature moulded stucco work—pilasters, entablatures, pediments, brackets and courses—while other mouldings would be merely decorative. Typical designs included shells, foliage (especially on capitals) and vermiculation. The Ammonite Order is a Classical order found almost exclusively in Brighton and Hove, consisting of fluted columns topped by capitals whose volutes are shaped like ammonite fossils. Architect Amon Henry Wilds used them extensively. Pilasters and columns of the Corinthian order are also common. Victorian and Edwardian buildings made use of intricately moulded courses and bracketed eaves. Elaborate carved reliefs are found on some of John Leopold Denman's buildings of the 1930s as a result of his collaboration with sculptor Joseph Cribb. In central Brighton, 20–22 Marlborough Place has a series of reliefs showing workers in the building trade, and 2–3 Pavilion Buildings have Portland stone capitals with scallops and seahorses.

Terracotta was popular in the Victorian and Edwardian eras as an external decorative element, as was yellowish faience earthenware. They were commonly used to top off a structure such as a wall or roof, in the form of finials, urns and caps. Carved terracotta panels were also used to decorate façades, especially below windows: the former Hove Hospital (now Tennyson Court) has prominent examples of this.

Basements are a very common feature of houses in Hove: it was customary for servants to live in them in the Victorian and Edwardian era. According to a Hove Council survey in 1954, 2,573 houses were built with basements.

== Types ==
=== Residential architecture ===
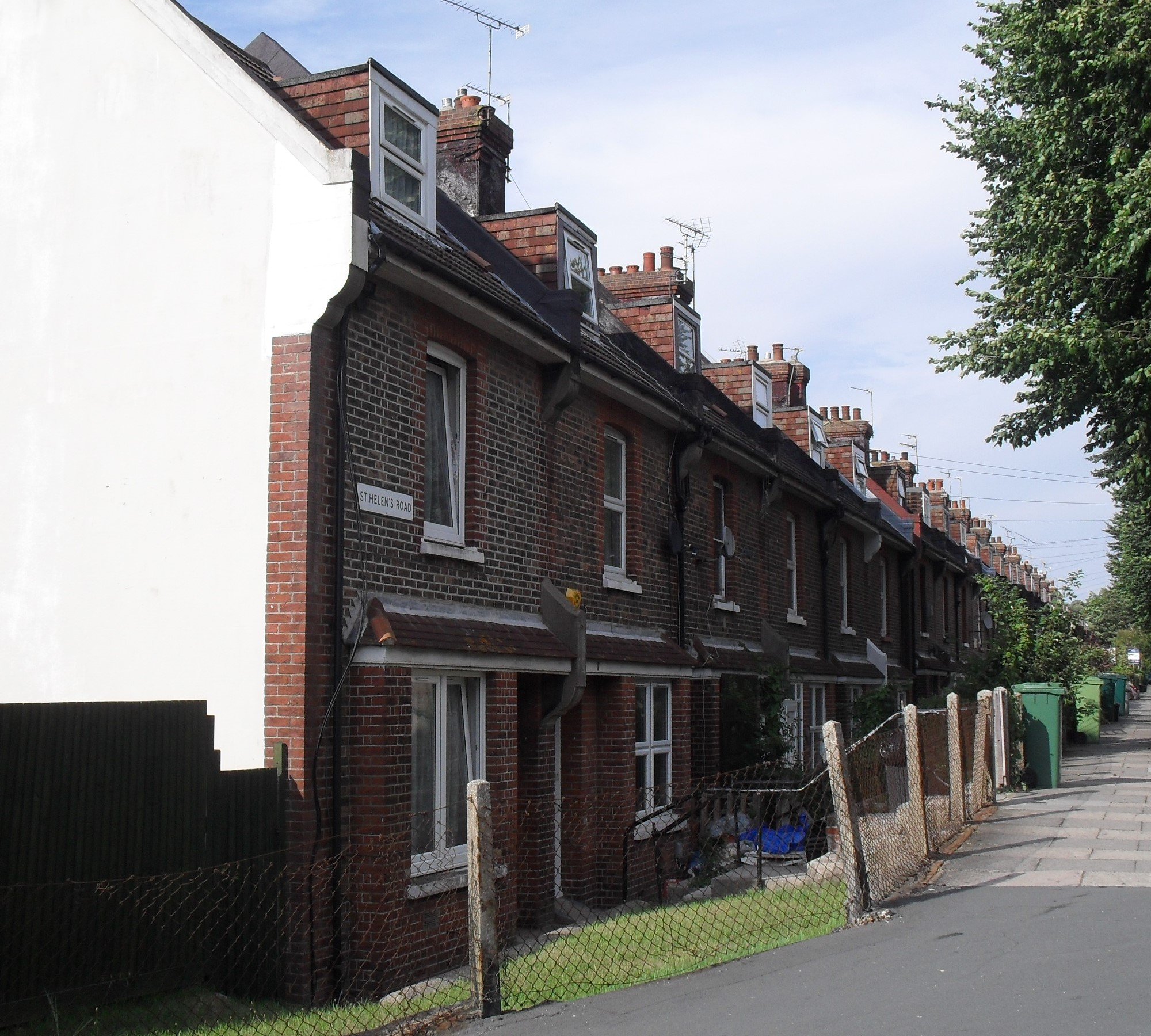
The council houses of St Helen's Road at Elm Grove date from 1897; they are the oldest in the city.

Brighton's earliest council houses date from the 19th century. Two landowners donated land around the present St Helen's Road in 1897, and simple polychromatic brick cottages were built to commemorate Queen Victoria's Diamond Jubilee. The first council houses built in the city since the 1980s were completed in 2013. In 2010 the council announced plans to demolish Ainsworth House, a 1960s low-rise block in the Elm Grove area, and build a higher-density high-rise family complex. Kite Place, a larger development of 57 council flats on the site of the old Whitehawk Library, was completed in 2018, at which time another 29-unit block was under construction.

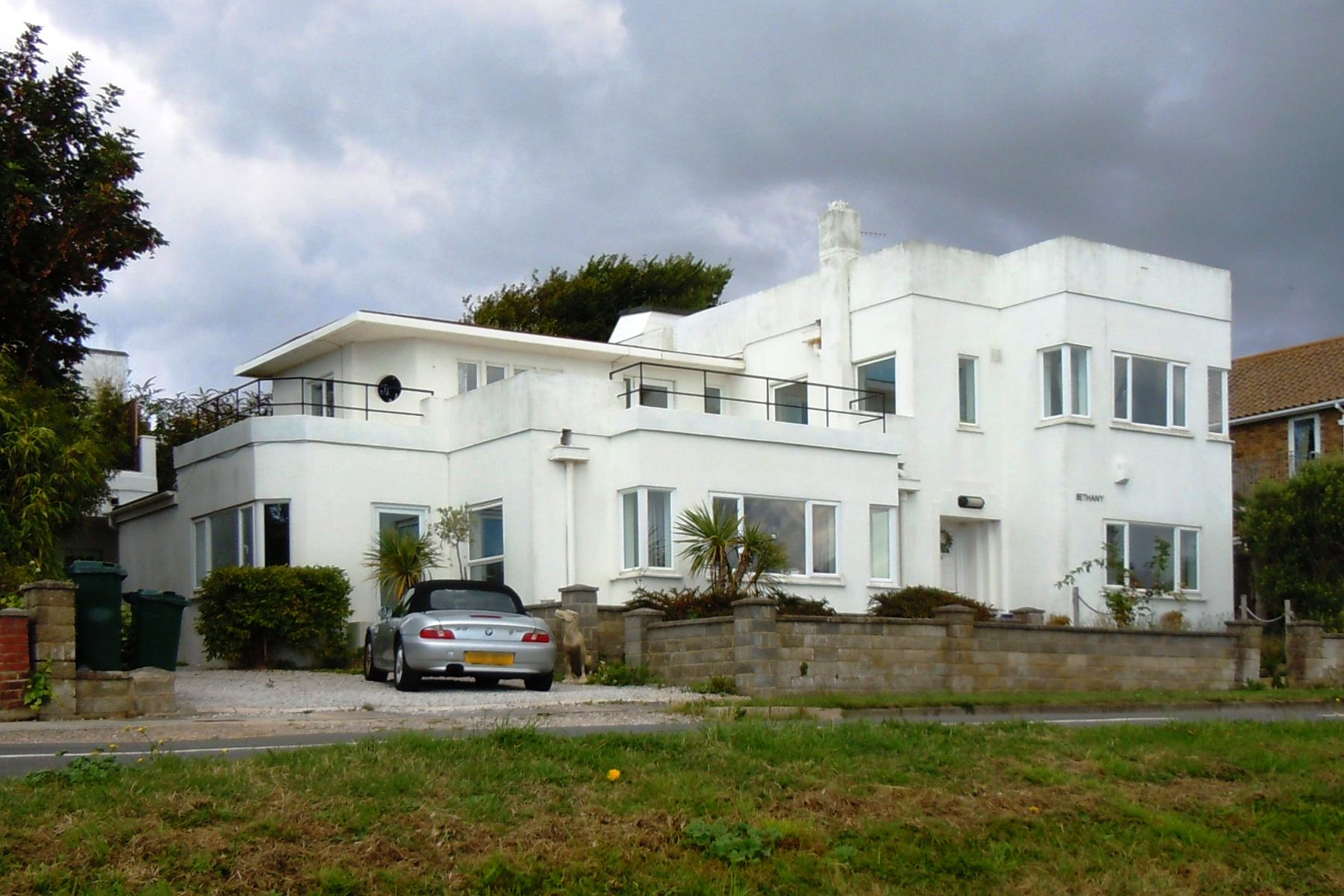
Cubist houses were built in the 1930s in Saltdean.

The shortage of building materials caused by the First World War prompted the building if hundreds of prefabricated homes, especially on the outskirts, but more innovative were the two all-metal houses built in 1923 on the Pankhurst estate. The government paid half the cost of construction of the "Weir Steel Homes". They were demolished in 1969. In 1934, three Cubist houses were built on a hillside site in Saltdean—among the earliest buildings of that style in Britain. More were planned, to demonstrate that the design could work on a large scale, but not built; some later houses in the area adopted elements of the style. Two of the three survive in much-altered form.

The gradual release of land for development around Hove in the 19th and early 20th centuries contributed to its distinctive pattern of growth—individual architects or firms designed small estates with a homogeneous overall style but with much variation between them. The Wick Estate's land was transformed between the 1820s and 1860s into the Brunswick Town estate, consisting of grand Regency/Classical-style squares and crescents of houses, with smaller versions in grid-pattern side streets. Next came the Cliftonville estate, which filled the gap between Brunswick Town and Brighton. Two-storey semi-detached stuccoed villas in the Italianate style, often with canted bay windows, characterised the early part of the estate—the long north–south roads between Church Road and the seafront. Cliftonville (now Hove) railway station opened to the north in 1865, stimulating further development in a similar style. A railway architect, F.D. Banister, designed most of Cliftonville, including number 42 Medina Villas (his own home during the 1850s) and three surrounding houses, whose Jacobethan red-brick exteriors and curved gables contrast with the surrounding villas. The West Brighton estate's rapid development began in 1872 on land bought from the Stanford family, the area's largest landholders. Until the Stanford Estate Act of Parliament was passed in 1871, no houses could be built on the land, despite tremendous pressure for growth; within 12 years, 550 acres (220 ha) were developed and Hove's housing stock had trebled. Sir James Knowles and Henry Jones Lanchester were the principal architects, and William Willett built the houses to a high standard.

Many flats and mansion blocks were built in Brighton, Hove and Portslade in the interwar and immediate postwar periods. St Richard's Flats (mid-1930s, by Denman and Son), "cottagey and jazzy at the same time", are stuccoed with wooden balconies and a clay-tiled roof. King George VI Mansions at West Blatchington consist of three long groups of three-storey brick and tile terraces forming a quadrangle around an area of open space; designed by T. Garratt and Sons in the "Vernacular Revival" style, they are little changed since their construction. Wick Hall (1936) and Furze Croft (1937, by Toms and Partners) occupy the old gardens of the original Wick Hall mansion. Their "elegant" form and high quality makes them "well-respected local landmark[s]". Furze Croft retains its Crittall steel windows and is characteristic of the 1930s Moderne style. Courtenay Gate occupies a prime site on Hove seafront; designed in 1934, it rises to seven storeys and has good architectural detail. In The Drive in Hove, numbers 20 and 22 are brick- and stone-built flats which enhance the streetscape of this important residential road; number 22 was "designed to resemble a castle". John Leopold Denman's Harewood Court (1950s), built for the Royal Masonic Benevolent Institution, is a seven-storey brick-built block in the Art Deco style. Nearby, at the junction of The Drive and Cromwell Road, Eaton Manor dates from 1968 to 1972, rises to eight storeys and contains over 100 flats. It is described on the local list as "handsome ... well articulated ... [and] an excellent example of the type".

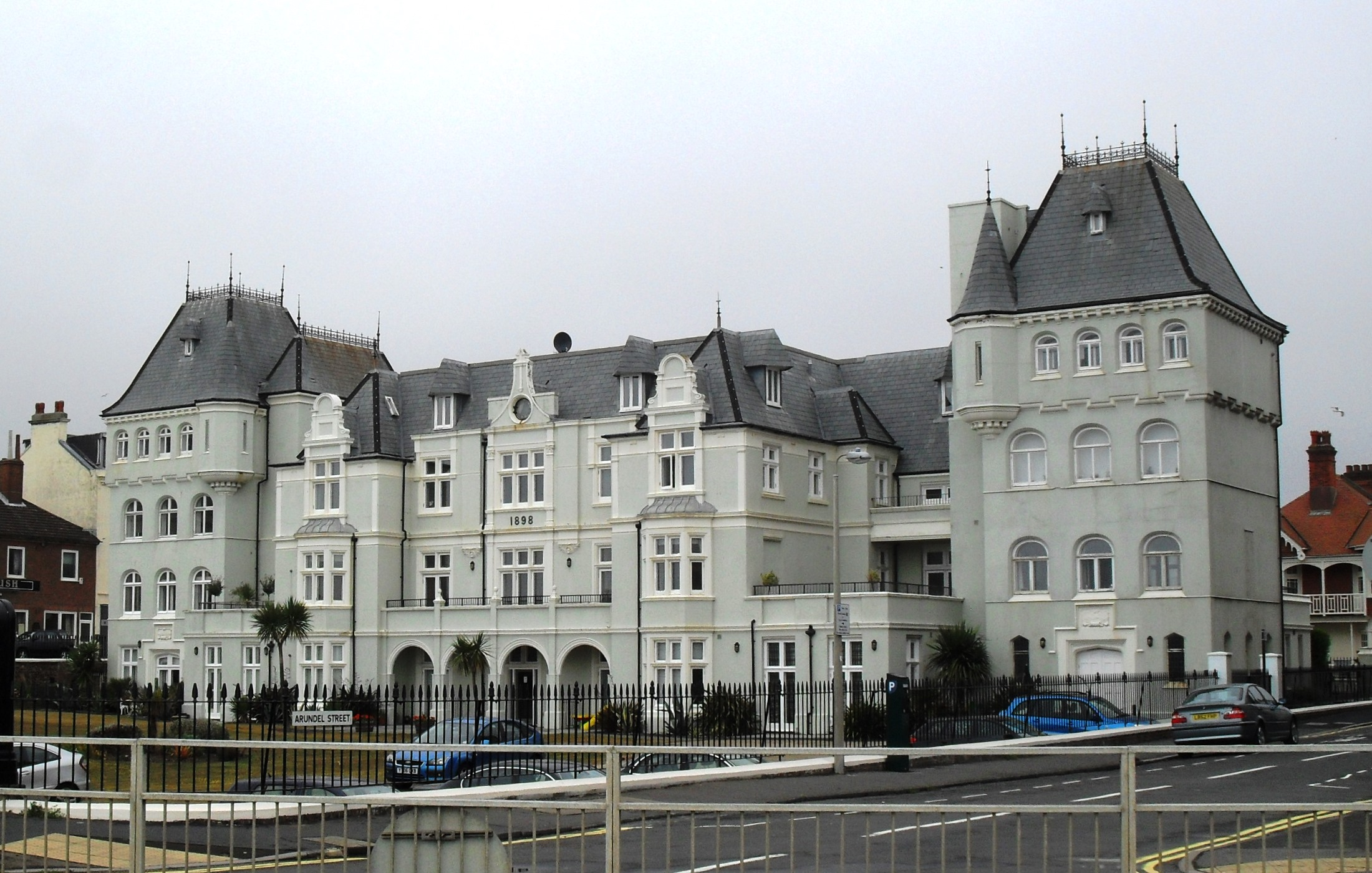
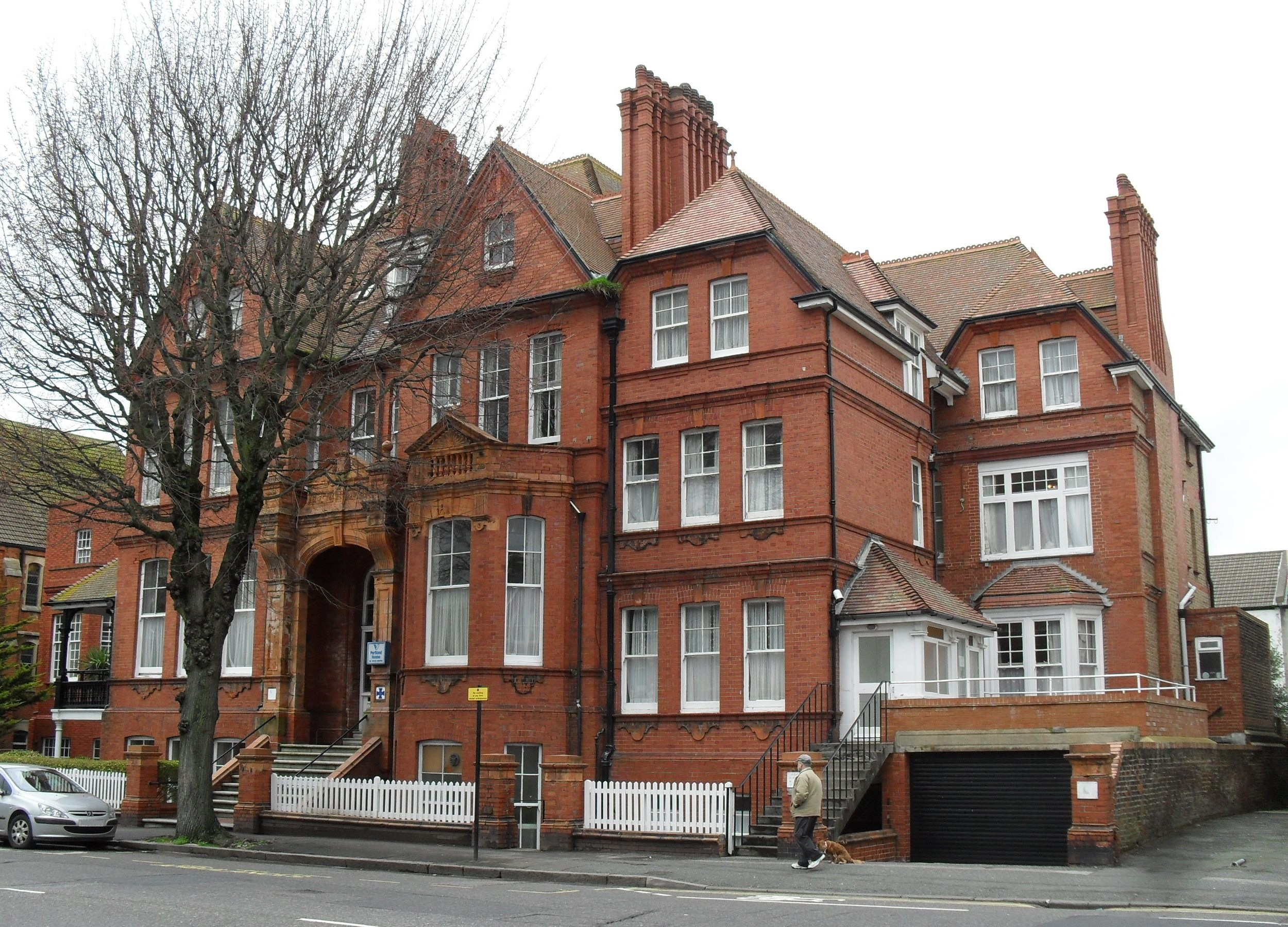
The former French and Police Convalescent Homes are now flats and a nursing home respectively.

For many years, convalescent homes and similar institutions have taken advantage of the mild climate and sea air. The Convalescent Police Seaside Home in Hove was Britain's first when it opened in 1890 in a house in Clarendon Villas. Almost immediately, architect J.G. Gibbins was engaged to design a purpose-built home on land nearby. This plot on Portland Road was in "a charming position, ... open to the sea" at the time. William Willett erected the building, which opened in July 1893. The red-brick home has gabled roofs, substantial chimney-stacks and a visually prominent entrance, and is a dominant presence on Portland Road. The home moved to Kingsway in 1966, and East Sussex County Council converted the old building into the Portland House Nursing Home. The French government paid for a large home to be built on the cliffs at Black Rock in 1895–98. The château-like French Convalescent Home was converted into flats in 1999, but retains its slate mansard-roofed corner pavilions, gabled entrance and garden-facing colonnade. The French Renaissance Revival style chosen by architects Clayton & Black contrasts with surrounding seafront developments. St Dunstan's, a charity which looks after blind former members of the Armed Forces, is based at Ovingdean, and its rest and rehabilitation home is based on a prominent downland site overlooking the coast road. The Burnet, Tait and Lorne Partnership's International Modern steel-frame and pale brick home has a cruciform plan with a symmetrical west-facing façade. Some windows are recessed, and others are flanked by brown-tiled columns. Described as "slightly reminiscent of Charles Holden's London Underground stations", its shape recalls that of a biplane. A low chapel in front is topped by a Winged Victory sculpture.

=== Commercial and industrial architecture ===
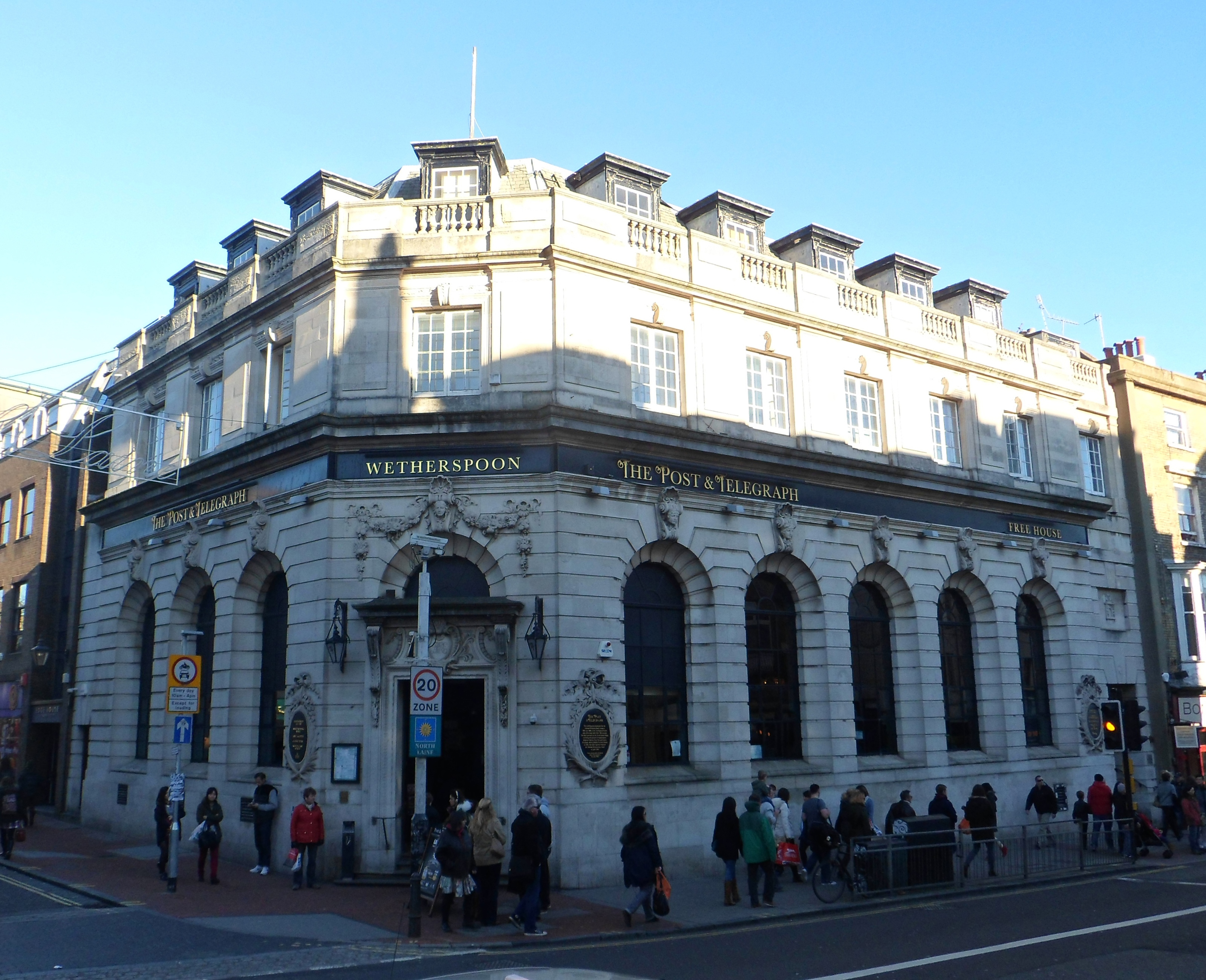
155–158 North Street, Brighton (now a pub) was built in the Louis XVI-style Neoclassical style for the National Provincial Bank.

The redevelopment of Brighton's three major commercial streets—North Street, West Street and Western Road—in the 1930s means that they are now characterised by distinctive interwar commercial buildings. Western Road has "a good run of large" department stores and other shops: a ship-like Art Deco corner building by Garrett & Son (1934) incorporating Clayton & Black's Imperial Arcade (1924), the Moderne former Wade's (now New Look) and Woolworth's stores (1928), the British Home Stores (1931 by Garrett & Son; now Primark) and the Stafford's hardware shop (1930; now Poundland) in American-influenced and Continental European-influenced versions of the Classical style and both decorated with elaborate motifs, and the "unusually palatial" Neoclassical Boots the Chemist (1927–28; now McDonald's). Covering the block between Dean and Spring Streets, its stone façade has four evenly spaced Ionic columns in the centre of the upper storey—originally a restaurant and tearoom which featured regular orchestral performances. Mitre House is a monolithic red-brick and stone structure dating from 1935. Now housing miscellaneous shops at ground-floor level, it originally incorporated the south coast's largest branch of International Stores, (Note: This company's trademark was a mitre.) a car showroom and Brighton's branch of W H Smith below its five storeys of flats. It replaced the 19th-century premises of Le Bon Marché, which after closure in 1926 were acquired by Brighton Corporation to house shops whose premises had been compulsorily purchased. Older buildings survive on the south side, including two Classical-style bank branches—Thomas Bostock Whinney's Doric-columned Classical-style Bath stone Midland Bank (1905; now HSBC) and Palmer & Holden's heavily rusticated National Westminster Bank of 1925, with large arched windows flanked by pilasters and a prominent balustrade on the parapet. The north side of North Street became the centre for bank and office buildings, though. Survivors include Denman & Son's "sombre Classical" Barclays Bank branch (1957–59), a very late use of that style, the Modernist/Brutalist Prudential Buildings (1967–69, by the Prudential's in-house architect K.C. Wintle), originally that company's headquarters but now shops and a hotel; another Thomas Bostock Whinney-designed Midland Bank branch, built in 1902 with a colonnade of Tuscan columns and a balustrade at the top, typical of the Edwardian era; and the former National Provincial Bank branch by Clayton & Black and F.C.R. Palmer (1921–23; now a Wetherspoons pub), with intricate carving and use of detail throughout the Louis XVI-style Neoclassical stone façade. Nearby at 163 North Street is "the chef d'œuvre of Clayton & Black, an ebullient essay in Edwardian Baroque", which they built in 1904 for an insurance company. The Boots store which replaced the Regent Cinema in 1974 had a "sculptural quality" because of the way its steel frame projected beyond the glazed curtain walls. Derek Sharp of Comprehensive Design Group undertook the work, but it the building was re-clad and redesigned in 1998, losing the original impact. Waterstones bookshop opposite, designed for Burtons in 1928 by their in-house architect Harry Wilson, has a Classical theme with full-height pilasters.

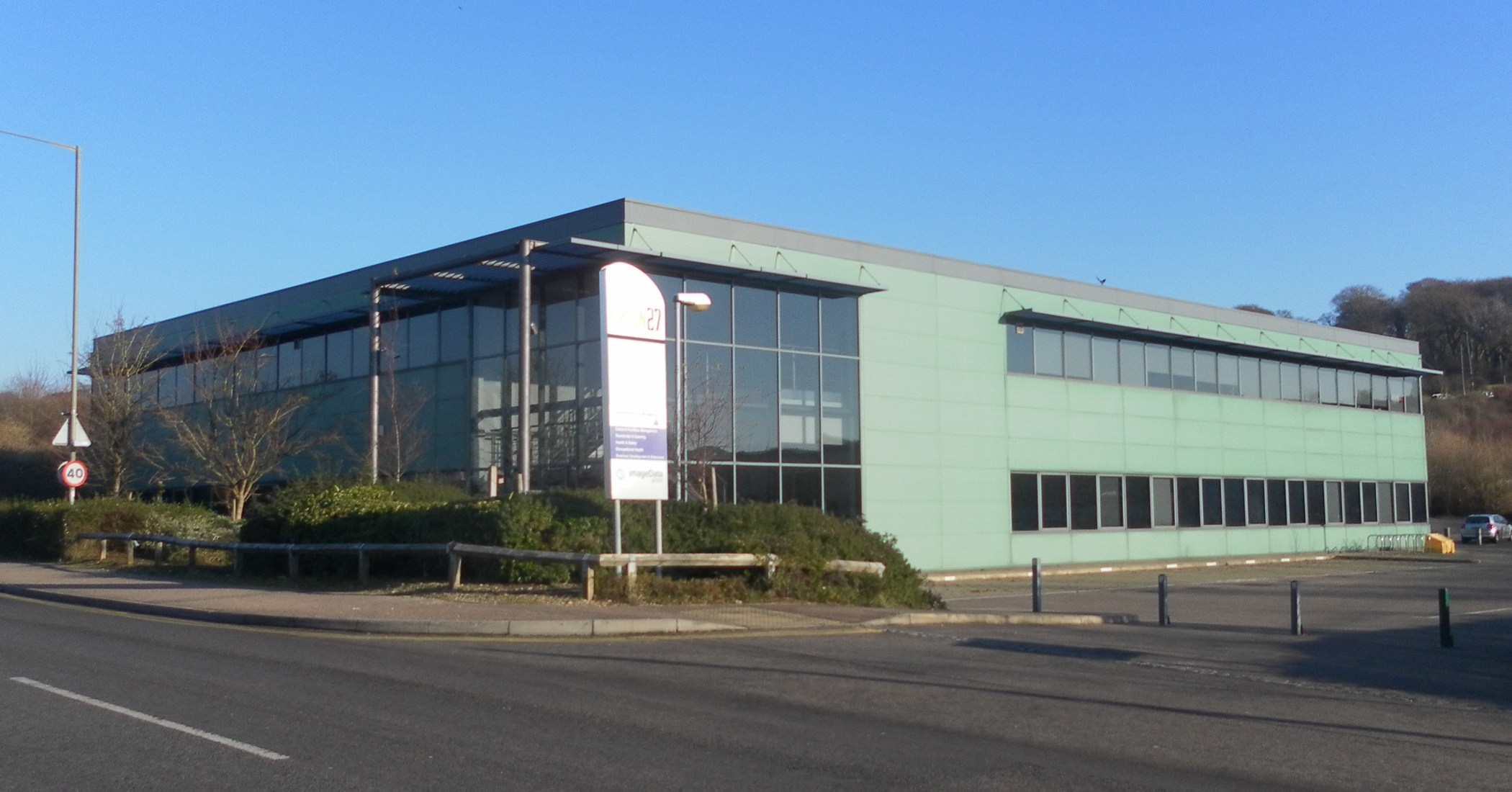
Exion 27 at Hollingbury is an ultramodern commercial/industrial building designed in 2001.

Several financial services companies made Hove their base in the late 20th century. The Sussex Mutual Building Society's new head office on Western Road (1975), called "one of the finest new office buildings in the locality" in contemporary reports, is a well-lit slate-roofed building with a glazed clay mosaic mural depicting scenes from Sussex, designed by Philippa Threlfall. The Alliance Building Society's three-storey steel-framed head office building at Hove Park was designed in the 1960s by Jackson, Greenen and Down, who gained the commission at the end of a competition started in 1956. It had strong horizontal lines offset by granite columns and tall, narrow steel-framed windows. On its opening in 1967, it was anticipated to be "a great contribution to the architectural thought of the 20th century"; but by the 1980s it was derided as a "carbuncle" and a "white elephant", its stark Modernist form having dated badly. The merged and greatly enlarged Alliance & Leicester Building Society moved out in 1994 and the building was knocked down in 2001. David Richmond and Partners' £65 million "City Park" scheme, consisting of houses and three curved-roofed office blocks rising to four storeys, replaced it. The Legal & General insurance company moved there from their earlier home at the former Hanningtons furniture depository on Montefiore Road (now the Montefiore Hospital); architects Devereux and Partners had "elegantly converted" this 1904 building for its new purpose in 1972.

High-tech offices of the 21st century include Exion 27 (built in 2001 by the Howard Cavanna consultancy), now used by the University of Brighton. The exterior is panelled with aluminium cladding and has extensive areas of tinted glass. Structurally, the building is steel-framed with steel and concrete floors and a large brise soleil. The "imposing" 28,000-square-foot (2,600 m^{2}) building was the city's first ultramodern commercial property and was intended for mixed commercial and industrial use, but its completion coincided with a slump in demand for high-tech premises.

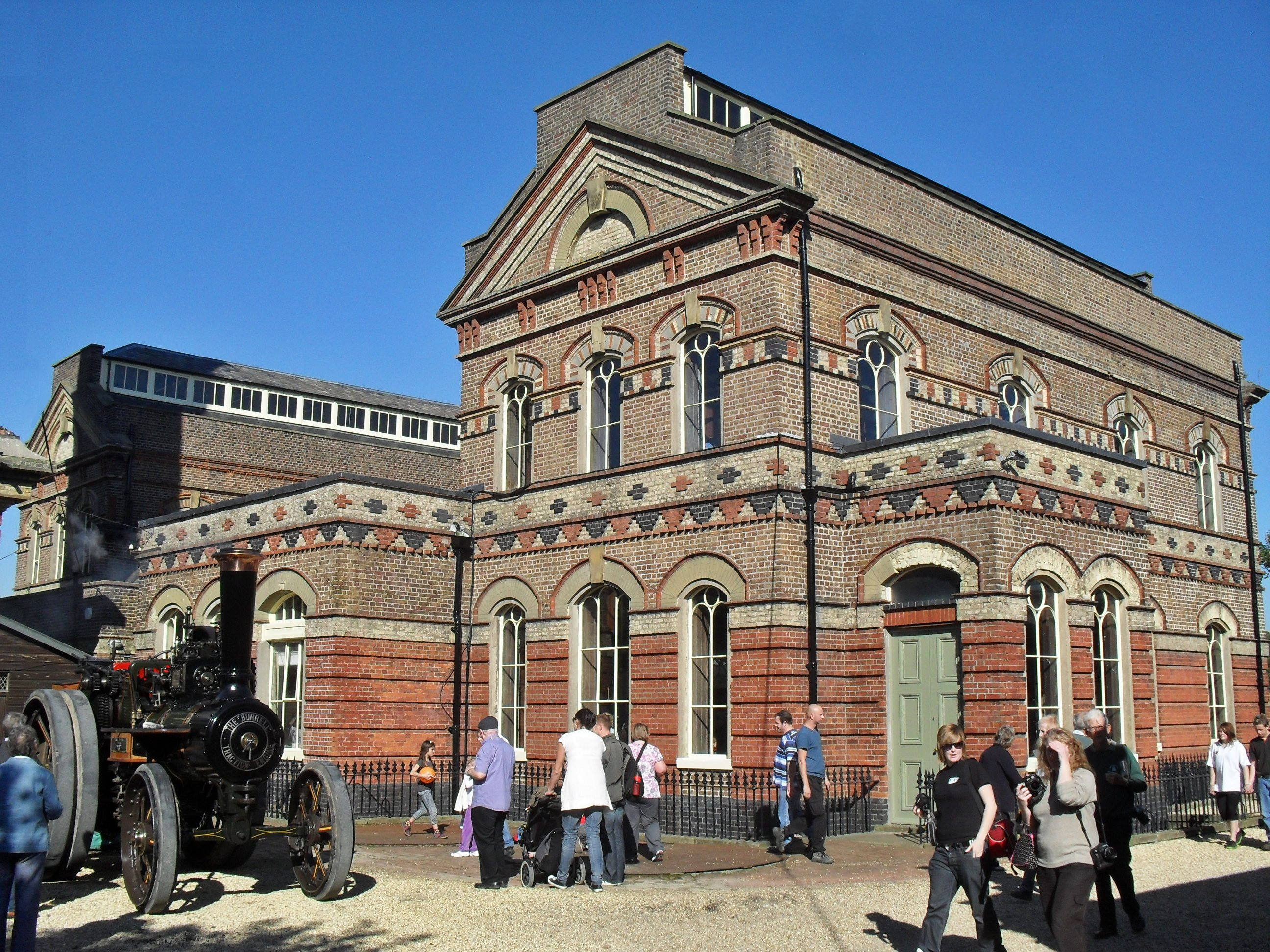
The British Engineerium's High Victorian Gothic architecture dates from the 1860s.

Brighton's first large-scale industry was the railway works, established next to the railway station in 1842. Several extensions were built as demand grew for locomotive manufacture and repair: in 1889, the buildings had to be extended on iron piers across the floor of the steeply sloping valley. After closure in 1957, some of the buildings were converted into a bubble car factory, which made 30,000 three-wheeled Isettas in the next seven years. The whole site was cleared between 1962 and 1969, and the mixed-use New England Quarter now covers the area. (The LBSCR also established a railway mission chapel for employees of the locomotive works; the flint-built Gothic Revival-style building on Viaduct Road is still in religious use, having been taken over by an Evangelical group.) The British Engineerium in West Blatchington is a museum which occupies a mid-Victorian former water pumping station. Its bold polychromatic brickwork, symmetrical High Victorian Gothic engine room building, visually dominant chimney and associated structures—all of which are listed—combine to form "an unusually fine asset" which is "a splendid example of Victorian industrial engineering". A former brewery in the ancient village centre of Portslade dominates the surrounding flint buildings. The "characterful" Classical/Italianate five-storey yellow-brick building was built in 1881 and is now in mixed industrial and commercial use. The former Phoenix Brewery (1821) between Grand Parade and the Hanover district was historically significant but architecturally modest, apart from the later brewery office and adjacent Free Butt pub. Closure came in the early 1990s, and the site was redeveloped for student housing. Allen West & Co. Ltd, an electrical engineering company which was a major employer in northeast Brighton from 1910, built several distinctive factories on Lewes Road and the Moulsecoomb estate, especially in the 1940s and 1950s. Most were demolished in the 1960s and 1970s, and the large warehouses of the Fairway Trading Estate occupy the Moulsecoomb site; but the company's wide brown-brick administrative and design office, built in 1966 on Lewes Road, was sold to Brighton Polytechnic and became Mithras House.

=== Ecclesiastical architecture ===
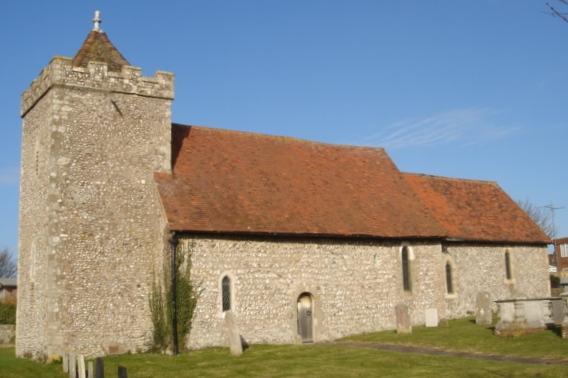
St Helen's Church at Hangleton, a Norman building, was restored in the Victorian era.

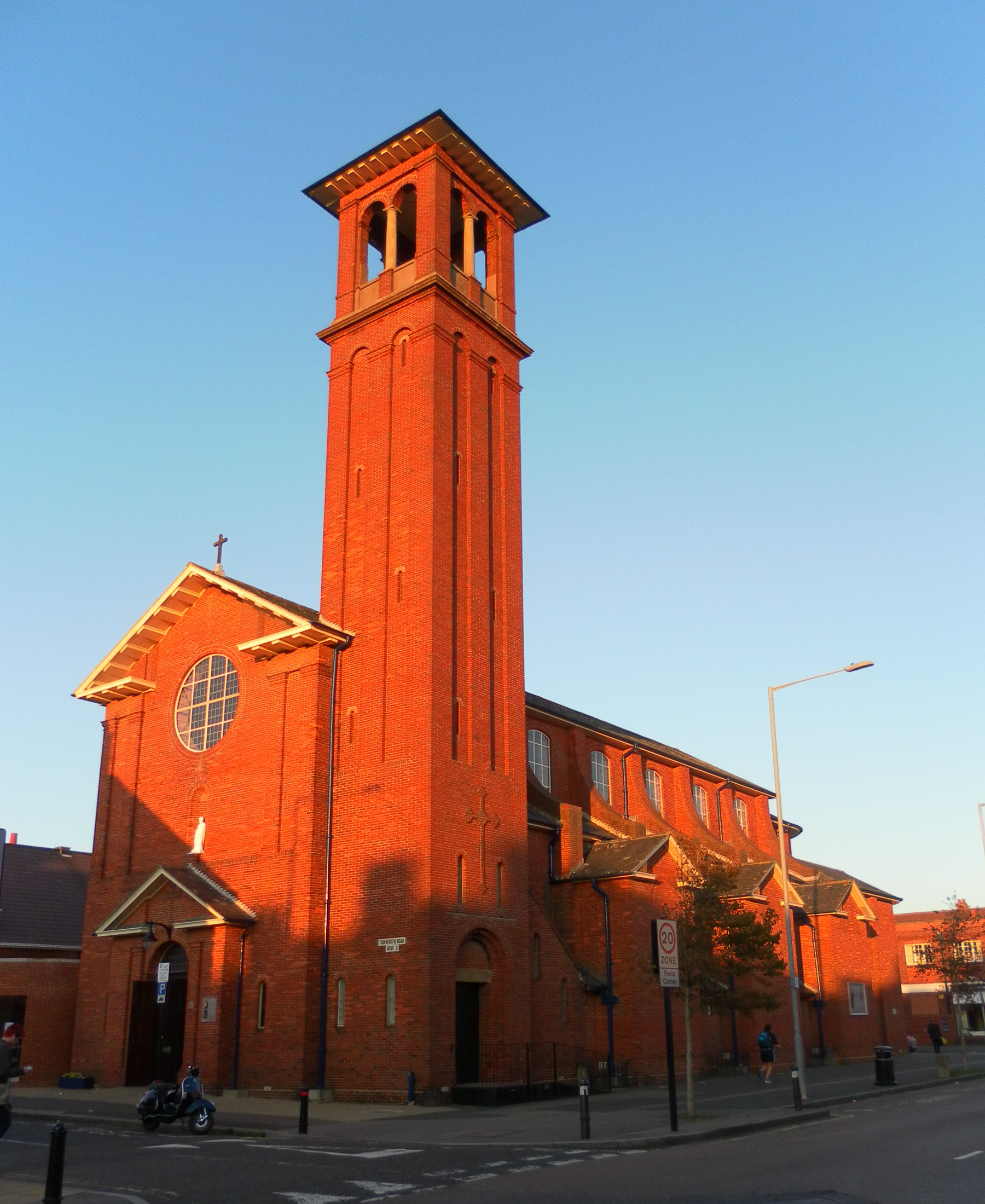
The "startling" campanile at St Peter's Roman Catholic Church in Aldrington is a local landmark.

Brighton's parish church, dedicated to St Nicholas, dates from the 14th century, St Andrew's Church at Hove is a century older, and the formerly outlying villages of Ovingdean, Hangleton, Rottingdean, West Blatchington and Portslade have even more ancient buildings at their heart. Nevertheless, the defining characteristic of Brighton and Hove's religious architecture is the exceptional range of richly designed, landmark Victorian churches—particularly those built for the Anglican community. The city's stock of such churches is one of the best outside London: this is attributable to the influence of fashionable society and the money it brought, and to the efforts of two Vicars of Brighton, Henry Michell Wagner and his son Arthur, to endow and build new churches throughout Brighton's rapidly developing suburbs and poor districts. Both men were rich and were willing to pay for well-designed, attractive and even flamboyant buildings by well-known architects such as Benjamin Ferrey, Richard Cromwell Carpenter and George Frederick Bodley. An early preference for the Classical style, as at Christ Church (now demolished) and St John the Evangelist's at Carlton Hill, gave way to various forms of Gothic Revival design—principally in the starkly plain form of the gigantic St Bartholomew's Church and the even larger St Martin's, whose fixtures and furnishings are classed among the best in England. However, Charles Barry's imposingly sited St Paul's Church (1824), which began the Gothic trend, was not commissioned by the Wagners; nor were Hove's new parish church, the Grade I-listed All Saints (1889–91) or Cliftonville's St Barnabas' (1882–83), both by John Loughborough Pearson. St Michael and All Angels Church, built in two stages by Bodley (1858–61) and William Burges (1893–95), was established by Rev. Charles Beanlands, a curate under Arthur Wagner at St Paul's. The two parts, in different interpretations of the Gothic Revival style, harmonise well, and the interior (mostly by W. H. Romaine-Walker) is one of the city's grandest. The present St Mary the Virgin Church is the second on the site: Amon Henry Wilds's Classical building collapsed during renovation and was replaced in 1877–79 by William Emerson's "dynamic" Early English/French Gothic design—his only church in England.

Also characteristic of the Victorian era was the rebuilding or restoration of the area's ancient churches. Richard Cromwell Carpenter rebuilt St Nicholas' Church from a ruined state in 1853–54, and Somers Clarke did more work in 1876. George Basevi carried out an "uninspiring" neo-Norman revamp of the 13th-century St Andrew's Church in the 1830s, James Woodman and Ewan Christian "over-restored" St Peter's Church at Preston Village in 1872 and 1878, and the 11th- and 12th-century St Peter's Church at West Blatchington was initially rebuilt by Somers Clarke in 1888–91 and comprehensively extended in 1960 in a complementary style by John Leopold Denman. The partly Saxon St Wulfran's Church, Ovingdean (the city's oldest building) was altered in the 1860s, although the overwhelming impression is that of a 12th-century Downland village church; and similar work was carried out at St Helen's Church in Hangleton in the 1870s, which nevertheless "retains its medieval character".

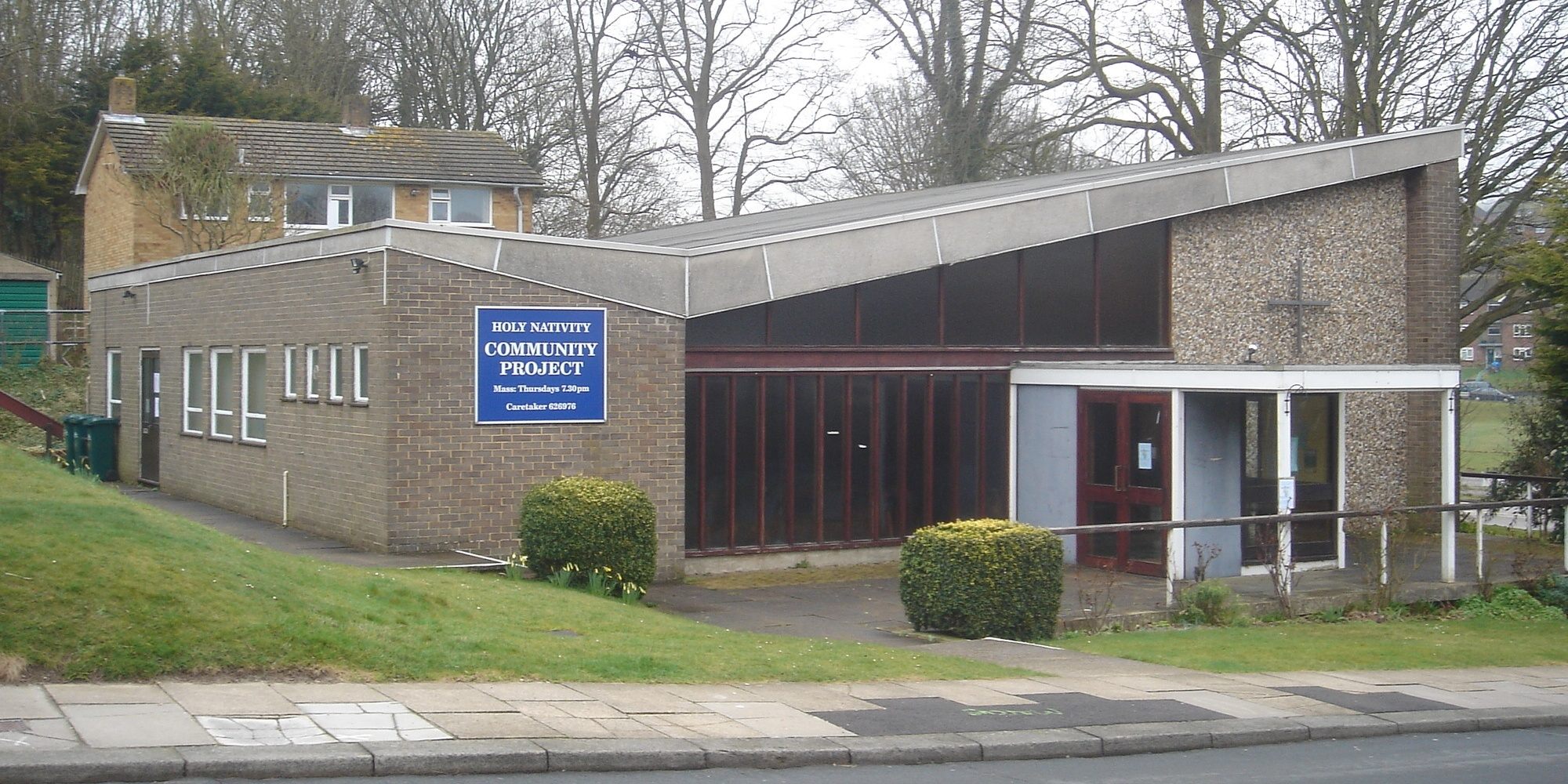
The Church of the Holy Nativity on the Bevendean estate is a Modernist building with a distinctive roofline.

Anglican churches continued to be built in the 20th century. The stripped-down Modern Gothic of Edward Maufe's Bishop Hannington Memorial Church (1938–39), with its "simple and gracious interior", has been called "Historicism at its most simplified". The Gothic Revival style was also used for Edward Prioleau Warren's Church of the Good Shepherd (1921–22) and Lacy Ridge's St Matthias Church (1907), with its round tower and hammerbeam roof. Harry Stuart Goodhart-Rendel's widely praised St Wilfrid's Church of 1932–34 (closed 1980), which embraced architectural Eclecticism and Rationalism, used two-tone brick and reinforced concrete and had an unusual interior layout designed to make the altar highly visible. John Betjeman said it was "about the best 1930s church there is". Postwar churches are mostly Modernist in style: the Church of the Good Shepherd in Mile Oak (1967, by M.G. Alford) has two angular roofs with six irregular vertical windows mounted between them, and Bevendean's brick and knapped flint Church of the Holy Nativity (1963, by Reginald Melhuish) has a distinctive roof with two unequal upward slopes. An exception is the 1950s St Mary Magdalene's Church on the Coldean estate, converted from an 18th-century barn in 1955 by John Leopold Denman and still wholly Vernacular in style.

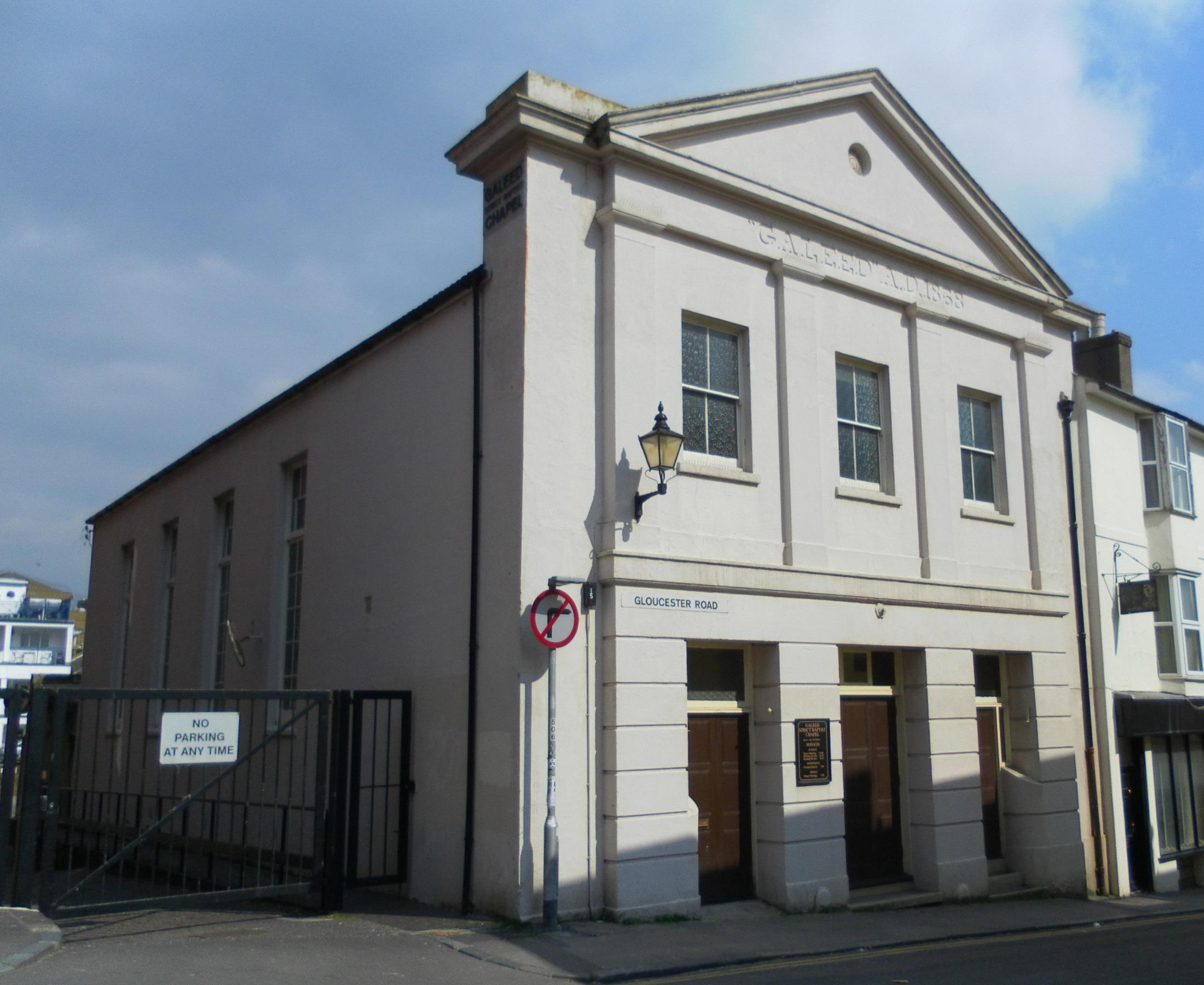
The Galeed Strict Baptist Chapel is an austere three-bay Neoclassical building in North Laine.

The city's 11 Roman Catholic churches range in style from the Classical St John the Baptist's Church (1832–35) in Kemptown—with monumental Corinthian columns and pilasters—to the varied Gothic Revival designs of St Joseph, St Mary Magdalen, the Church of the Sacred Heart and St Mary's at Preston Park (which has some Arts and Crafts elements). The "startling" Romanesque Revival St Peter's Church at Aldrington (1915) has a landmark campanile, while Henry Bingham Towner's design for the Church of Our Lady of Lourdes, Queen of Peace at Rottingdean (1957) was a "very conservative" and simplified modern interpretation of the Gothic form. Other postwar churches are vernacular or Modernist in style, such as St Thomas More Church at Patcham (1963)—distinguished by a wooden geodesic dome and large areas of glass.

Nonconformist churches and chapels vary in age and style. Holland Road Baptist Church in Hove (1887, by John Wills) is a landmark Purbeck stone Transitional Gothic Revival building—a rare design for that denomination, although the flint-built Florence Road Baptist Church near Preston Park (1894–95, by George Baines) is in the similar Early English style. The same architect designed a smaller flint and brick chapel at Gloucester Place in 1904; its symmetrical façade was spoiled by wartime bomb damage to the miniature flanking towers. Strict Baptists meet at the starkly plain Neoclassical Galeed Strict Baptist Chapel (1868). Methodist church designs include Romanesque Revival (Hove Methodist Church, by John Wills in 1895, featuring a prominent rose window), Early English Gothic Revival (E.J. Hamilton's 1897–98 building at Stanford Avenue in Preston Park, with stone-faced brickwork) and Modernist at Patcham (1968) and Dorset Gardens in Kemptown (2003). Former chapels of that denomination include the Gothic Revival United Church in Hove (1904), the Renaissance-style church at nearby Goldstone Villas (converted into offices in 1968), W.S. Parnacott's distinctive Gothic-style stuccoed and pinnacled Primitive Methodist chapel (1886) in Kemptown, Thomas Lainson's Romanesque Revival church at nearby Bristol Road and James Weir's Free Renaissance design of 1894 on the main London Road. The Brutalist Brighton and Hove National Spiritualist Church (1965) on Edward Street has a "starkly unperforated" windowless concrete exterior softened by the effect of its "sinuous" curving walls.

The headquarters of the Anglican Diocese of Chichester are in the grounds of Aldrington House, a Victorian villa now used as a mental health support centre. The Diocese previously used two houses in Brunswick Square, but in 1995 James Longley & Co. of Crawley constructed the new building—Church House—to the design of architect David Grey and at a cost of £670,000. It is in the Sussex vernacular style and makes extensive use of local materials. The uppermost of the three storeys is hidden within a deep tiled roof with high-level windows. The red-brick walls have contrasting string courses of dark blue brick.

=== Civic and institutional architecture ===
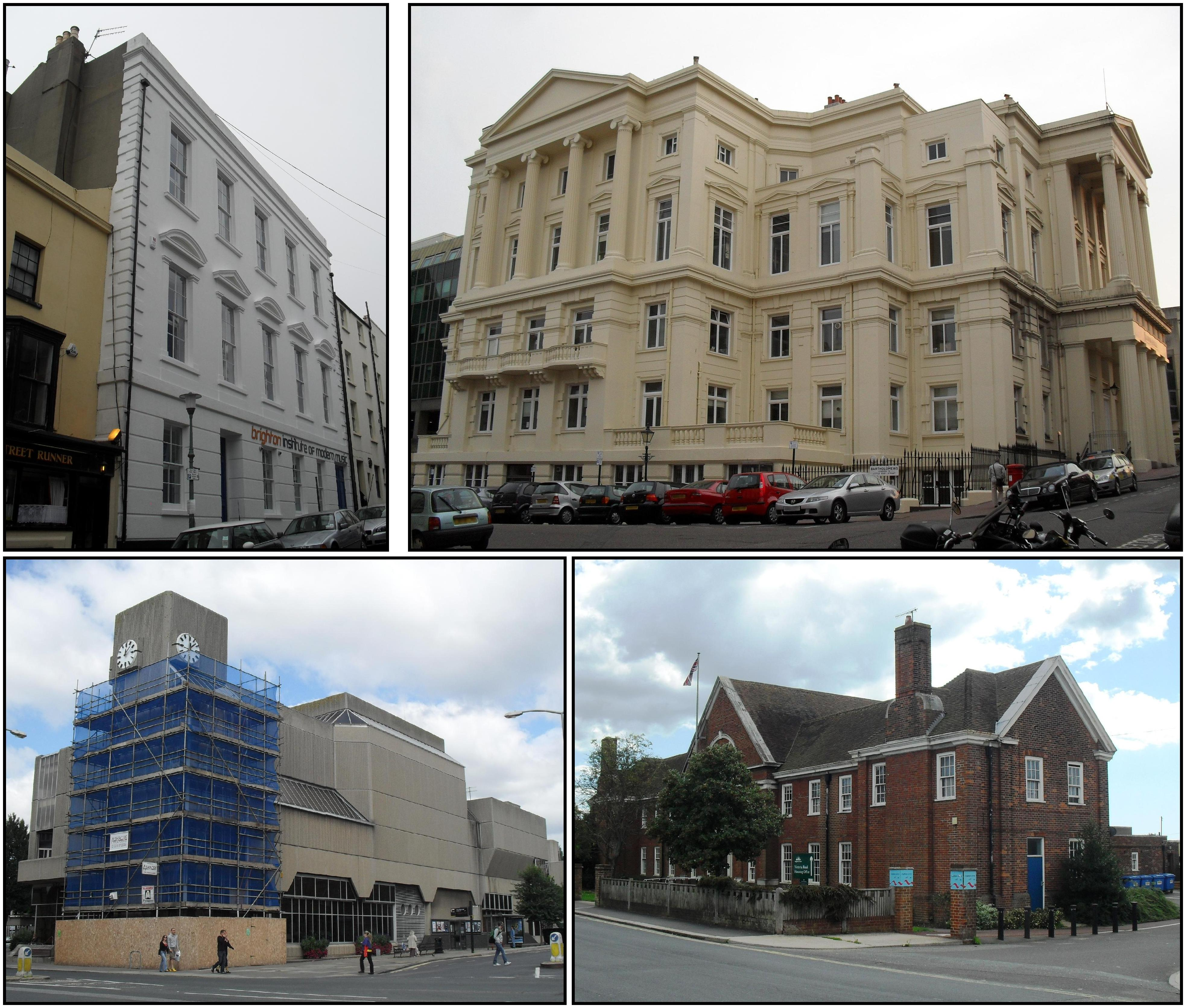
Clockwise from top left: Brunswick (former), Brighton, Portslade and Hove Town Halls

Brighton, Hove, Brunswick Town and Portslade have each had a town hall, but only those at Hove and Brighton are still in use and Hove's was rebuilt after a fire. Medieval Brighthelmston used a building (called the Townhouse) which was more of a market hall, and a later building (1727) known as the Town Hall was principally used as a workhouse. Work on the first purpose-built town hall began in 1830; Thomas Read Kemp laid the first stone, and Thomas Cooper designed it on behalf of the Brighton Town Commissioners (of which he was a member). Brighton Corporation spent £40,000 to extend it in 1897–99, to the design of Francis May. Its severe Classical design, with huge Ionic columns and wide staircases, was criticised in the 19th century, and May's infilling of the cruciform building's wings affected the composition's symmetry.

Brunswick Town Hall, built on behalf of the Brunswick Square Commissioners, was the first town hall in the Hove area. Its Classical-style stucco façade concealed stone and brickwork. It cost £3,000 and opened in 1856. The three-storey building served Brunswick Town and Hove jointly from 1873, but more space was needed, so Alfred Waterhouse was controversially commissioned to design a new building on a large site bought from the Stanford Estate. The new town hall opened in 1882, featuring an elaborate Renaissance Revival-style red-brick and terracotta edifice with stonework and ornately mullioned and transomed windows featuring tracery and coloured glass. A prominent clock tower supplied by Gillett & Bland rose from the roof. The building was destroyed by fire in 1966, leaving only the west side standing. By the 1960s Victorian architecture was considered old-fashioned and unworthy of preservation, and the remains were demolished by 1971 to make way for a replacement building.

The Queen Anne-style Portslade Town Hall has not been used for that purpose since 1974, when Portslade Urban District became part of Hove; nevertheless part of the premises are still used by Brighton and Hove City Council. The building was originally the Ronuk Hall and Welfare Institute—a social club and multi-purpose hall built for workers at the nearby Ronuk wax polish factory. Gilbert Murray Simpson designed the red-brick building for the company in 1927; the first stone was laid in July of that year, and the hall opened in 1928. It was lavishly furnished and decorated with paintings by well-known artists. Portslade Urban District Council bought the "impressive" building for £36,500 in 1959. Its main hall has two balustraded galleries.

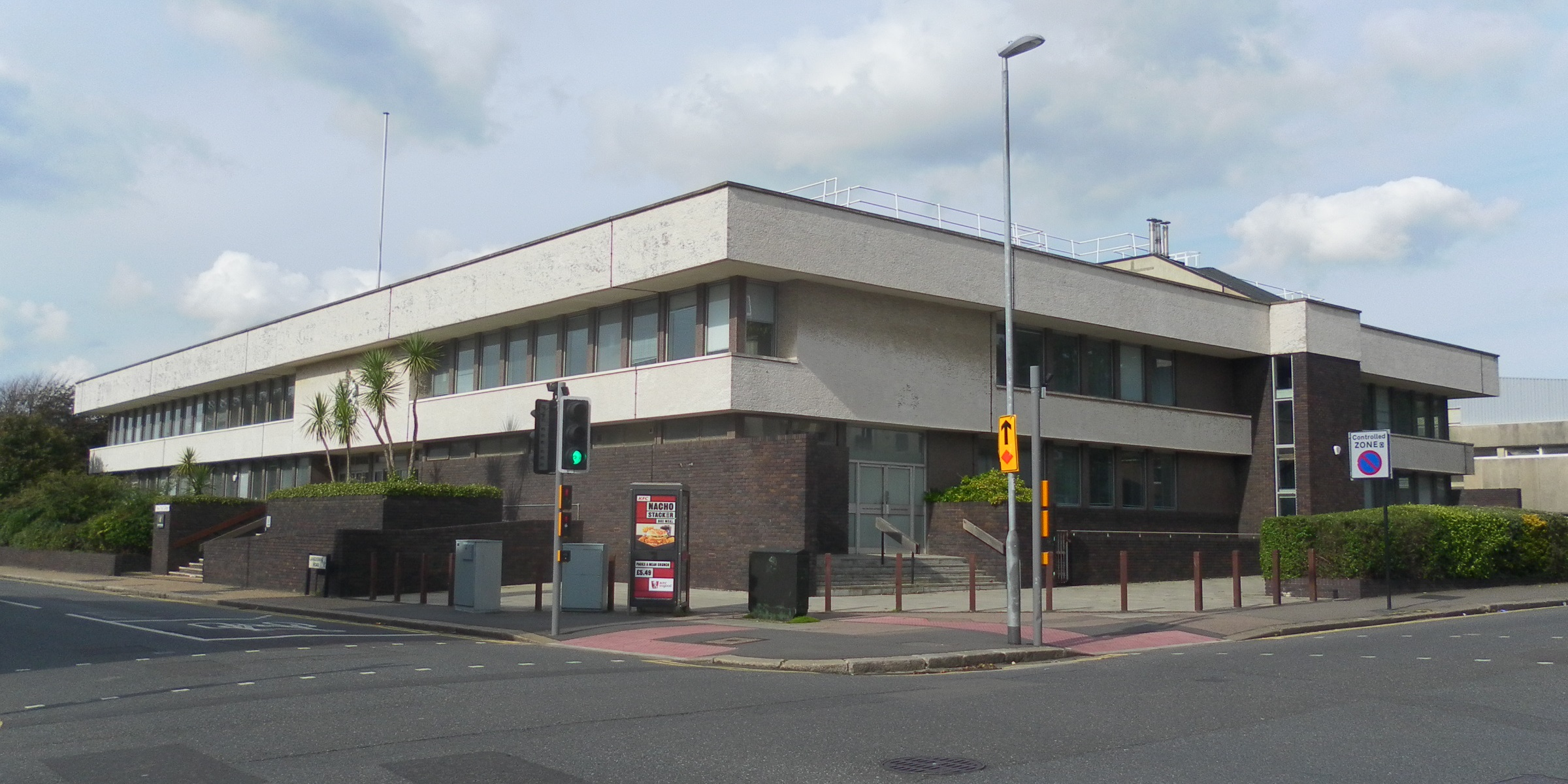
Hove's "strongly horizontal" courthouse dates from 1972.

Brighton's police did not have a central headquarters building until 1965: they were based in the old Town Hall, then in the basement of Thomas Cooper's new building when that was built in 1830. Brighton Borough Engineer Percy Billington's "graceless" police headquarters opened on 27 September 1965 on John Street in Carlton Hill. At 64 St James's Street in Kemptown, an 1850s building with stone urns and a balustrade housed an early district police station. In November 2008, a two-storey sustainable building replaced an existing police facility in Hollingbury. Portslade had two police stations but neither remains in use: one at North Street existed by 1862 but was superseded by the St Andrew's Road station in 1905. This was built with stables and a hayloft at the rear for the constables' horses. The two-storey brick-built station is a "good quality, dignified" Queen Anne Revival-style building with a gabled façade and a hipped roof of clay.

Until 1869, offenders facing court action were taken to various inns or to Brighton Town Hall. On 3 July of that year, Charles Sorby's two-storey Tudor/Gothic brick and Bath stone hipped-roofed courthouse took over. It still had influences of the Italianate style popular for courthouses 20 to 30 years previously. Percy Billington designed a new law courts complex at a cost of £665,000 on a site next to the police station in Carlton Hill in 1967, and this replaced the original building on Church Street. Billington's concrete structure, extended in 1986–89, faced the same criticism as the police station: in particular, the charge that the architecture "failed to provide civic monuments of quality". In Hove, Holland Road has a modernist police station (1964) and courthouse, known as Hove Trial Centre, (1971–72). The latter cost £380,000 and has four courtrooms and office accommodation. Designed by Fitzroy Robinson & Partners, the low-set, "strongly horizontal" building has a recessed lower storey and is built of brown-blue brick from Staffordshire.

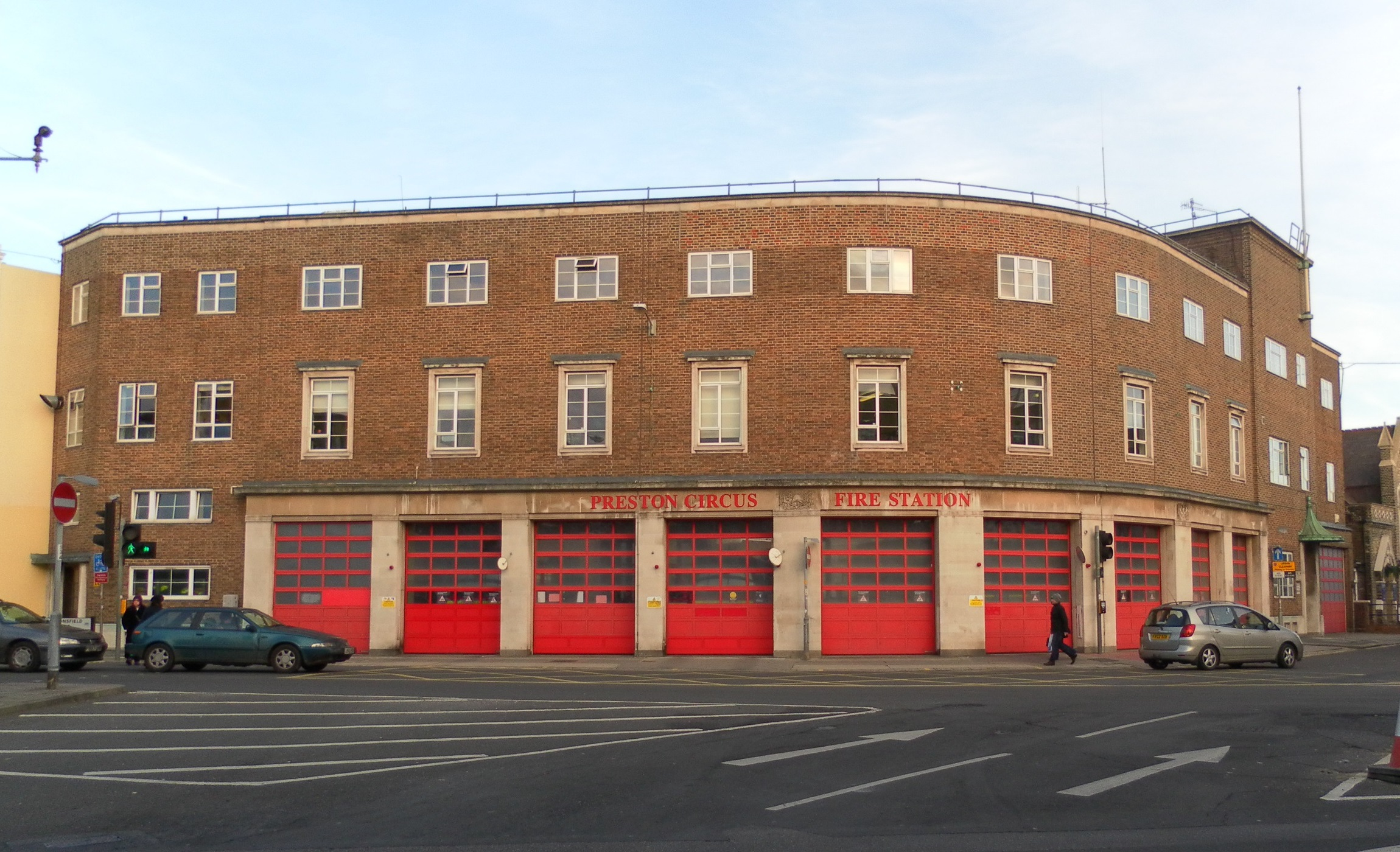
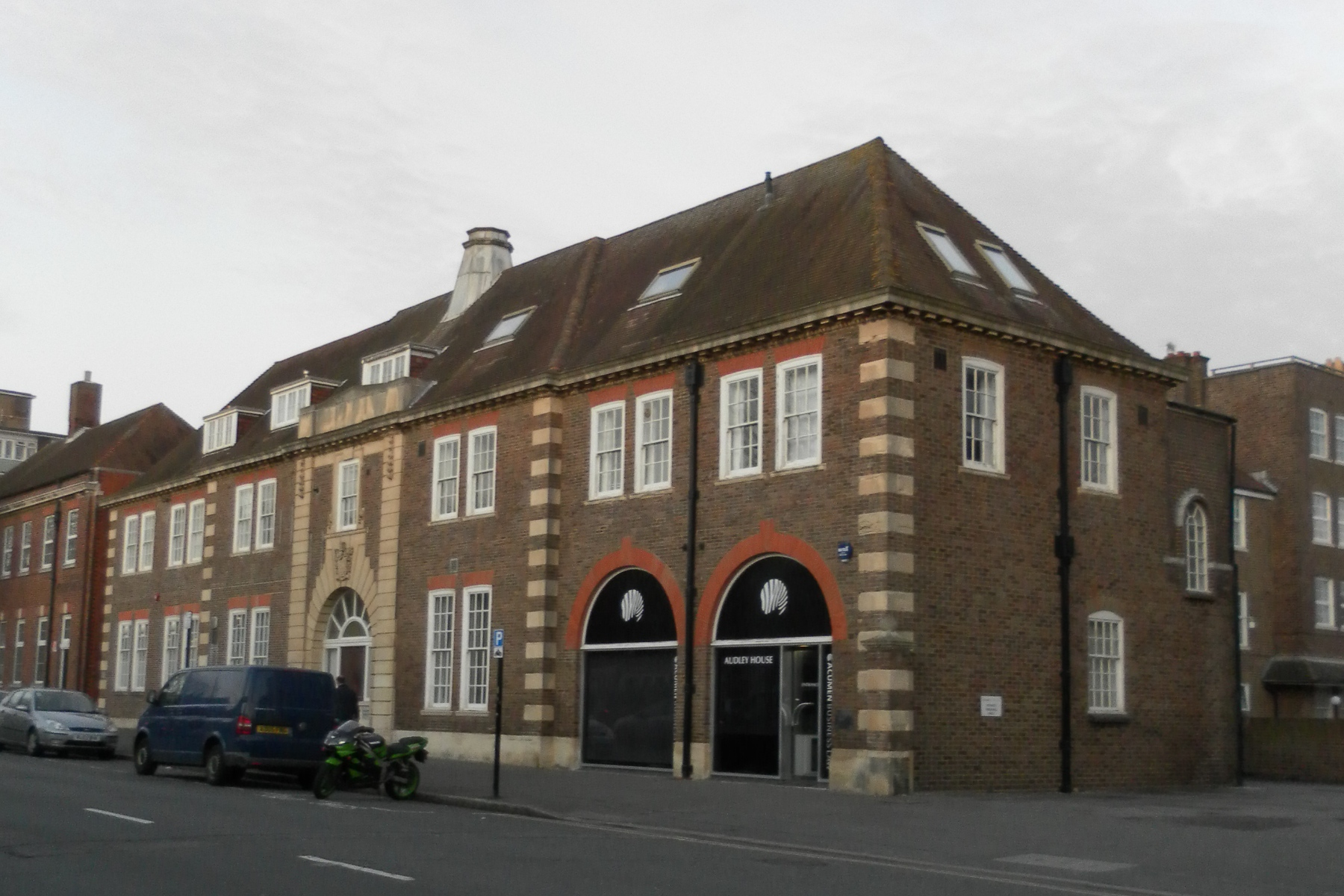
Graeme Highet's Preston Circus Fire Station in Brighton and Clayton & Black's former Hove Fire Station, built in 1938 and 1929 respectively.

The city's main fire station faces the five-road junction of Preston Circus, near London Road viaduct. Established on the site of a brewery of 1901, the building was redesigned in 1938; Graeme Highet won the commission in competition. His plain brick exterior, curving gently round the road, combines "restrained Modernism" with more old-fashioned elements such as a canopied entrance and windows with prominent architraves. Sculptor Joseph Cribb provided carved reliefs for the main doors. Portslade's former fire station operated from 1909 until about 1941 and passed into commercial use in 1972. District Surveyor A. Taylor Allen's design was built by Ernest Clevett. The "attractive-looking building" is of white brick and terracotta, and is surrounded by a wall with a multi-coloured brick pier supporting a large gas lamp. There are decorative terracotta plaques and a gabled dormer window with terracotta finials. In 1914, Hove Council took responsibility for firefighting within its boundaries and immediately sought a replacement for the existing fire station of 1879 in George Street. Clayton & Black's "elegant" new fire station on Hove Street, completed in 1929 at a cost of £11,098, was inspired by one at Bromley—but the "charming bellcote" on the roof was a reference to the nearby Hove Manor, demolished soon afterwards. The façade had a double archway. The building became redundant in 1976 and was converted into flats in 1981 by architect Denis Hawes.

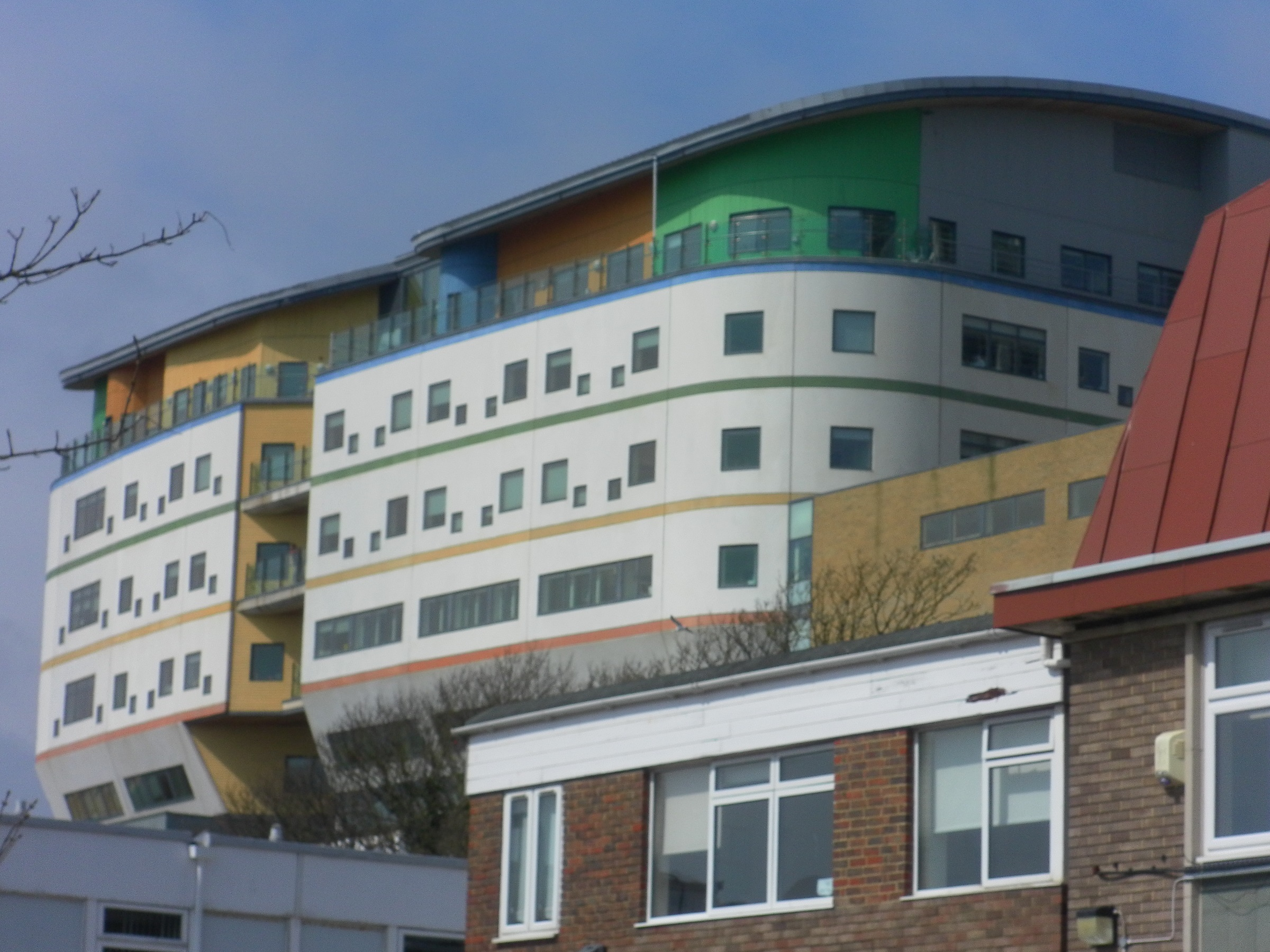
The new Royal Alexandra Children's Hospital rises above the buildings of the Royal Sussex County Hospital.

Brighton's main hospitals are the Royal Sussex County Hospital (RSCH) in Kemptown and the Brighton General Hospital at the top of Elm Grove on Race Hill. The former was built in several stages. Charles Barry's original buildings (1826–28) are Classical and pedimented; William Hallett and Herbert Williams built three complementary extensions between them by 1853; Edmund Scott and F.T. Cawthorn added the similar Jubilee Building in 1887; Cawthorn built the prominently gabled Outpatients' Building in 1892; John Leopold Denman's Eye Hospital in 1935 is in his characteristic Neo-Georgian style; and Robin Beynon's 2002–05 work on the Audrey Emerton Building reflects Regency-style themes of stuccoed bowed façades. Brighton General was originally the town's workhouse. Designed in 1853 but not built until 1865–67, it is in a "debased" Italianate style with a long frontage flanked by pavilions. George Maynard and J.C. & G. Lansdown were responsible. More buildings were added in 1887, 1891 and 1898 to the rear.

The Royal Alexandra Children's Hospital has occupied two buildings of markedly different architectural character. Thomas Lainson's Queen Anne Revival-style building of 1880–81 in the Montpelier district was distinguished by its Dutch gables and much use of terracotta and red brick. Clayton & Black added a colonnade and other parts in 1906, and a major extension (again with prominent gables) was undertaken in 1927 by W.H. Overton. It closed in 2007 after its replacement opened next to the RSCH, and has been redeveloped for housing. Lainson's building has been retained but the other parts were demolished in 2012. The new hospital was designed by Building Design Partnership (scheme architect Ben Zucchi) in 2004–07. Its "boat-like form [is] evocative of Noah's Ark" as it rises dramatically above the other RSCH buildings. Features include low, child-height windows, a multicolour-panelled curved façade and an oversailing roof. It cost £36 million, has three times the capacity of the old building and won a design award in 2008.

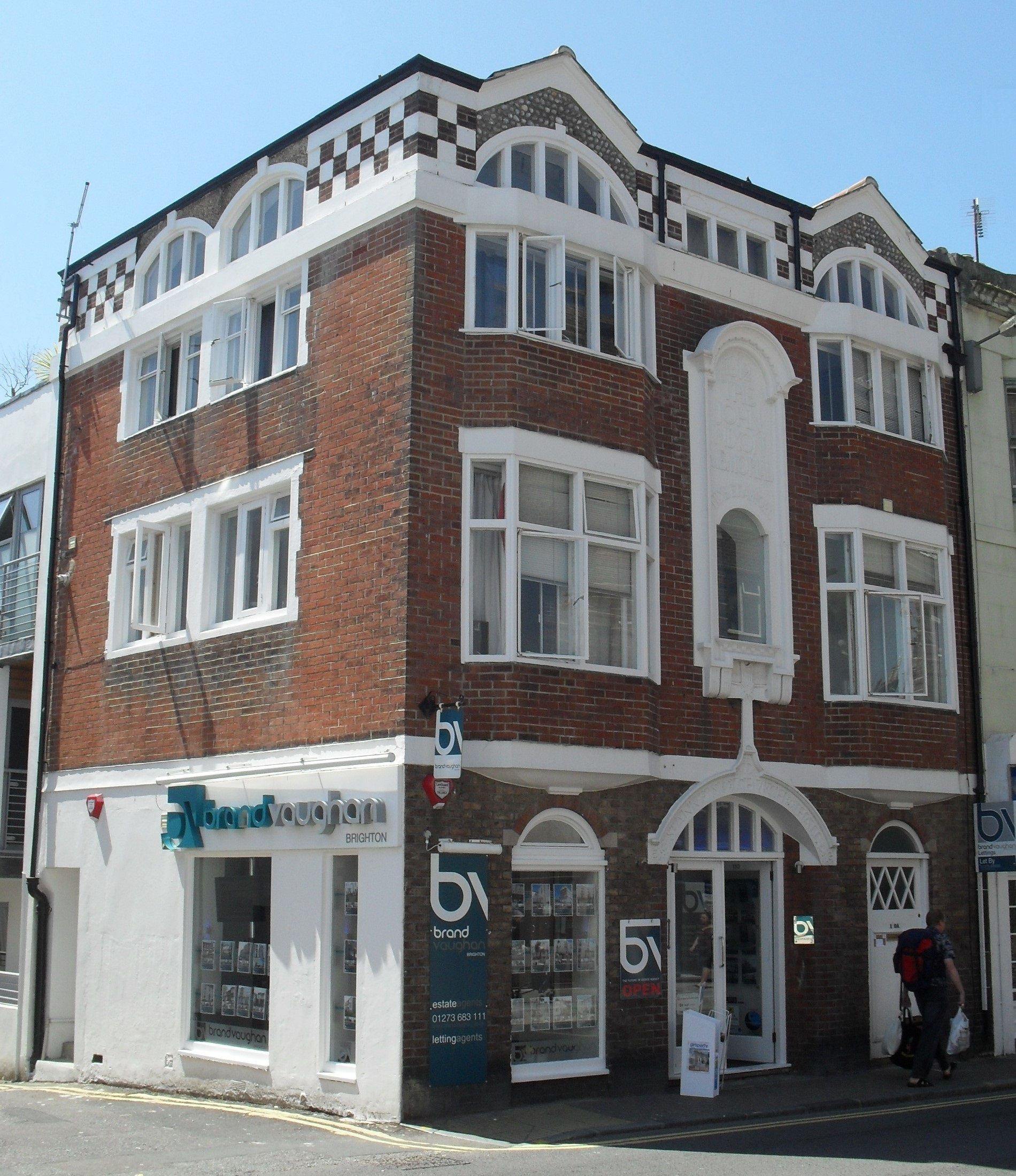
The former John Nixon Memorial Hall (1912) is Neo-Jacobean in style.

Hove's first hospital was a "classic Victorian building" on Sackville Road, built in 1885–88 by John T. Chappell. Architects Clarke & Micklethwaite designed the red-brick hospital, which had prominent chimneys on a slate roof, crow-stepped gables and a large terracotta panel with various inscriptions. Closure was announced in 1994, and a local property development firm paid £550,000 for the building in 1998. Under the guidance of scheme architect Christopher Dodd, it was converted into 37 housing association flats called Tennyson Court, retaining all original architectural features. A£5 million replacement, the Hove Polyclinic, opened in West Blatchington in October 1998. Bryan Graham of architecture firm Nightingale Associates designed the facility, which is distinguished by a right-oriented round tower, several curved windows with decorative panels of opaque glass, and six-panelled doors. Montefiore Hospital was founded in 2012 in the "magnificent red-brick" former Hanningtons furniture depository on Davigdor Road, Hove, built by Clayton & Black in 1904.

Public halls, gentlemen's clubs and similar institutions were often designed to stand out from their surroundings, especially when they were expensively funded as memorials to individuals. The former John Nixon Memorial Hall of 1912, by an unknown architect, contrasts with Kemptown's small-scale stuccoed terraces with its broad arched-windowed, red-brick façade and the Neo-Jacobean free-style treatment of its gabled roofline. It was used as a church hall, as was the Edward Riley Memorial Hall in Carlton Hill (now the Sussex Deaf Centre)—a brown-brick building with a steep clay-tiled roof and high flint walls around it. The Ralli Memorial Hall near Hove railway station introduces a red-brick Renaissance theme to the formal gault-brick villa architecture of the area. A distinctive balconied porch and prominently mullioned and transomed windows also contribute to the building's character. On the West Brighton estate, Samuel Denman's Hove Club (1897) is another Jacobean-style red-brick building with prominent gables, which also features buttresses rising to form chimneys, a loggia entrance, stone mullions and transoms, Art Nouveau-style windows and ornate interior timberwork.

==== Educational buildings ====
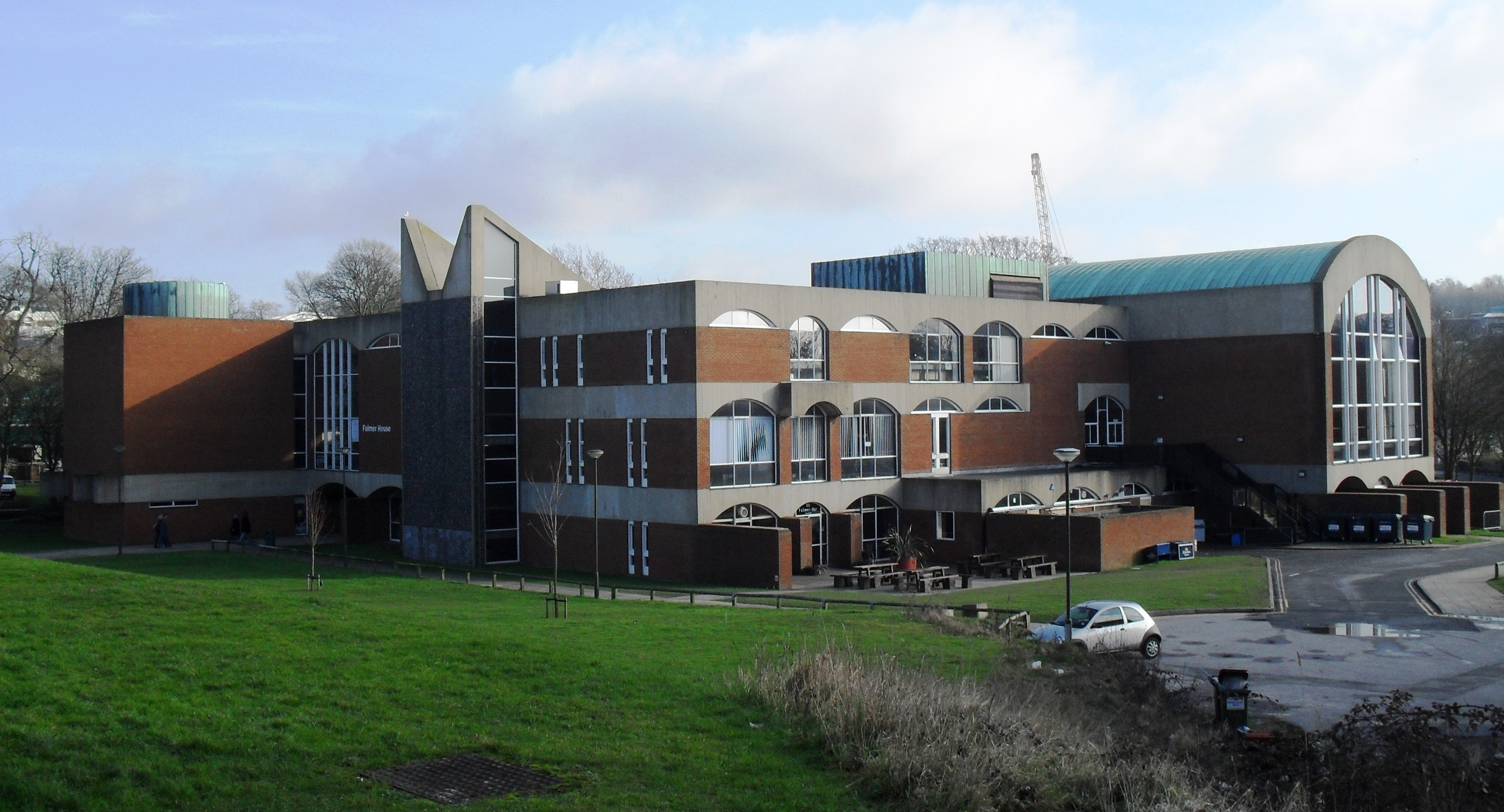
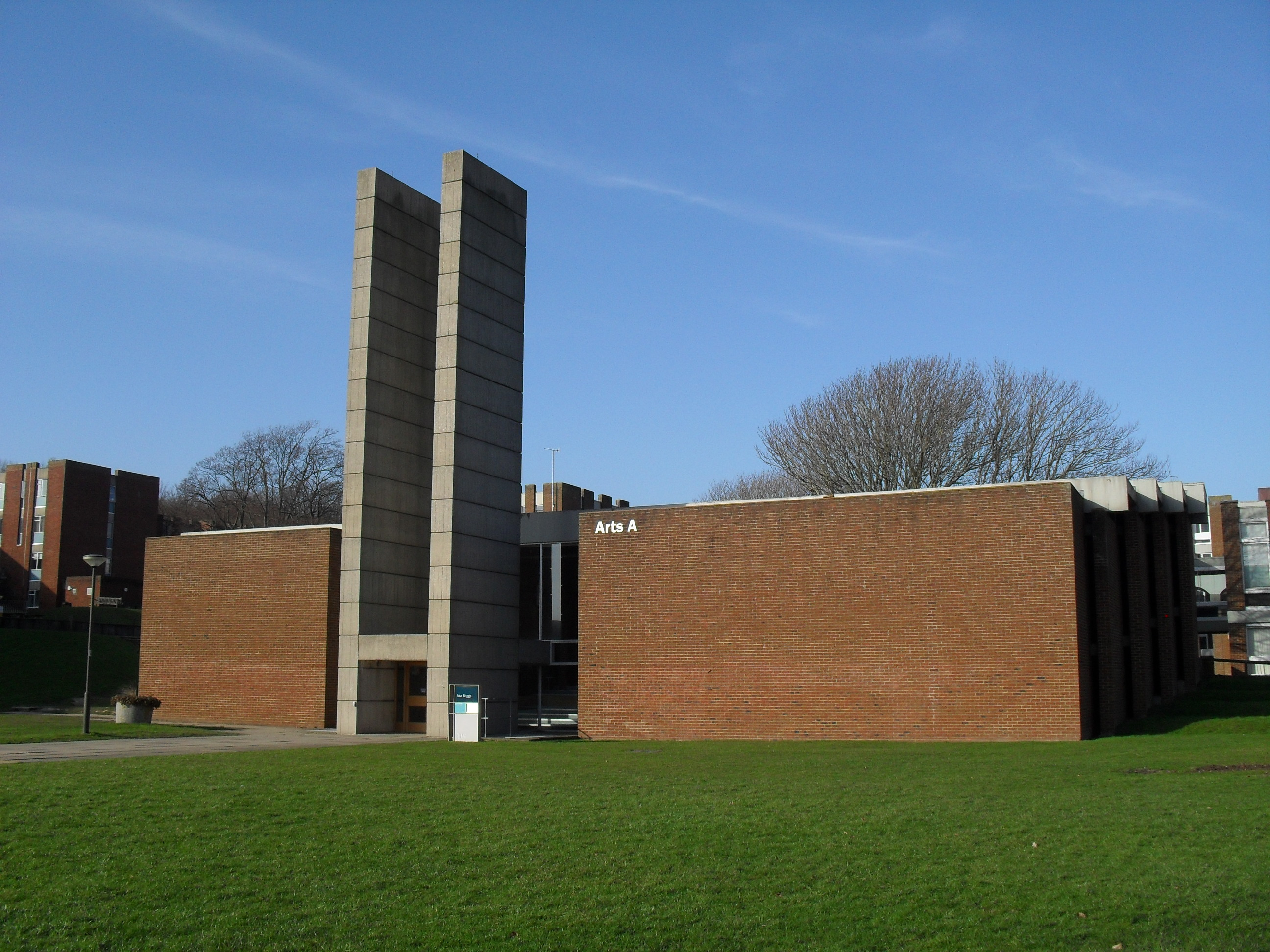
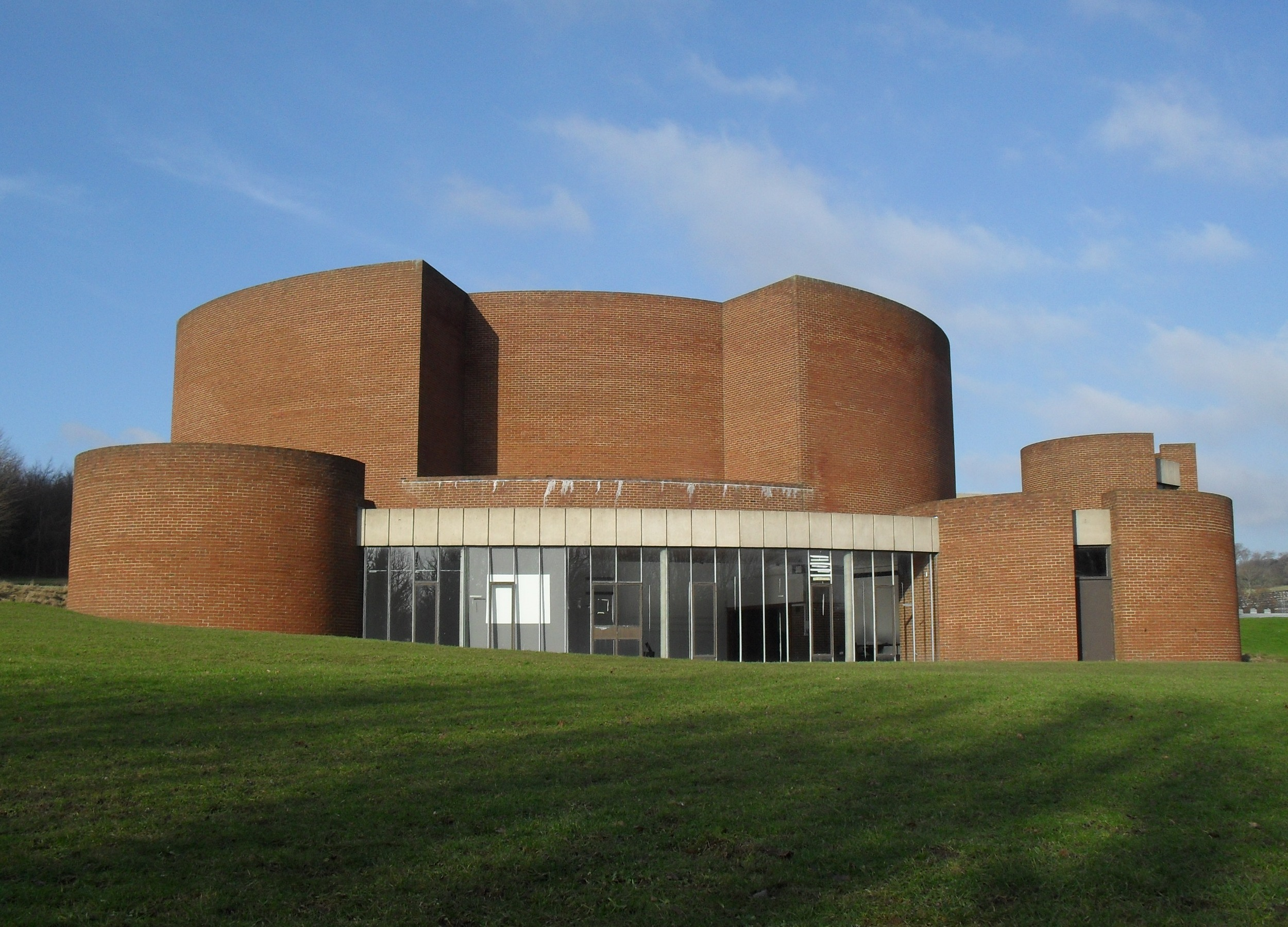
Basil Spence's buildings at the University of Sussex include Falmer House, Arts Building A and the Attenborough Centre for the Creative Arts (pictured left to right).

The Buildings of England series called the "majestic and intimate" University of Sussex "the best architecture of the second half of the 20th century" in Brighton and Hove. Although buildings are still being added on the 200-acre (81 ha) site, the original development by Basil Spence (1960–65) retains its original character—especially in the relationship between the buildings and the undulating downland landscape on the semi-rural site (carved out of the Stanmer estate). Spence's buildings are "post-1955 Modernist", influenced by both Le Corbusier and the "epic monumentality" of Ancient Roman architecture. They include a library, lecture rooms for arts and sciences, a non-denominational place of worship, an arts centre (the Attenborough Centre for the Creative Arts) and Falmer House, the university's social centre. All are articulated in red brick and concrete, with hollow vaults, concrete beams, arches and fins. New buildings including numerous halls of residence have been added at various times by architects including Eric Parry, the RH Partnership, ADP Architecture, DEGW and H. Hubbard Ford.

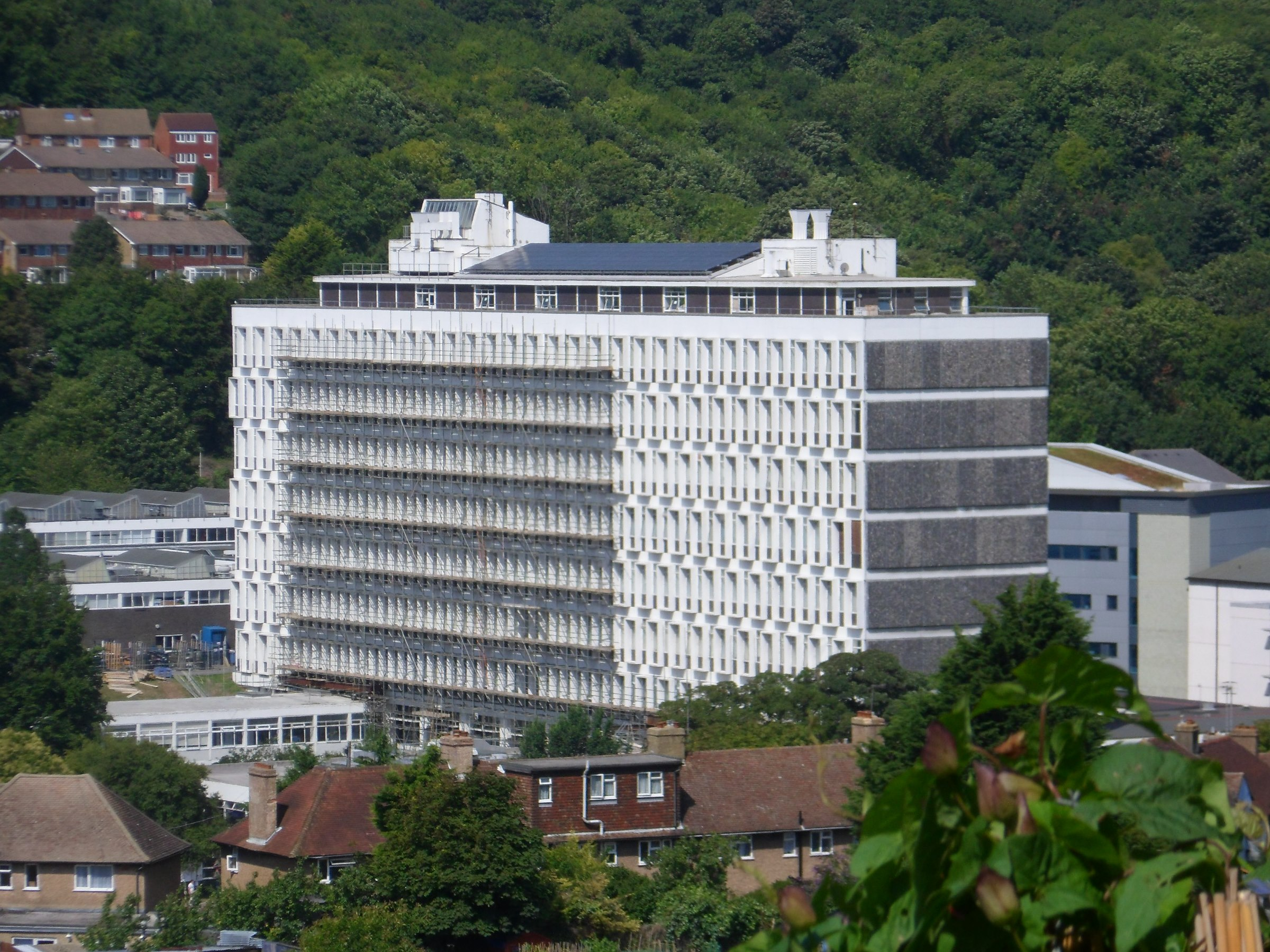
The Cockcroft Building (University of Brighton) dates from 1962 to 1963.

The University of Brighton's Moulsecoomb site consists of Mithras House, a former industrial building, and "a collection of utilitarian modern buildings" flanking Lewes Road. Mithras House dates from 1966 and was built for industrial use; more prominent is the 300-foot (91 m), ten-storey slab of the Cockcroft Building. Built entirely of concrete—mostly precast except for the lowest storeys—it has an east-facing entrance flanked by two-storey concrete piers and set below panels of flint. The main elevations are "busy" with a regular rhythm of windows. Long & Kentish's adjacent Aldrich Library (1994–96), curtain-walled with concrete and aluminium, is a "light and elegant" contrast to Cockcroft. The curvaceous Huxley Building (2010) also adjoins. The University also has a site at Grand Parade, which consists of the Phoenix Building and the former College of Technology. The former, designed by Fitzroy Robinson Miller Bourne and Partners in 1976, forms a "brutal intrusion" into the early-19th-century terrace of Waterloo Place: only two of its 14 houses remain. Now known as the Grand Parade Annexe, the former College of Technology—a Modernist building with sections of unequal height and windows set in prominent concrete frames—was designed by Percy Billington between 1962 and 1967. Described as "one of Brighton's better postwar buildings" for its sensitive relationship to its prominent curved site, the layout of its windows recalls the 19th-century terraces it adjoins. It replaced the former Municipal School of Art by J.G. Gibbins, built in 1876–77 of brick, terracotta and granite in the 14th-century Italianate style.

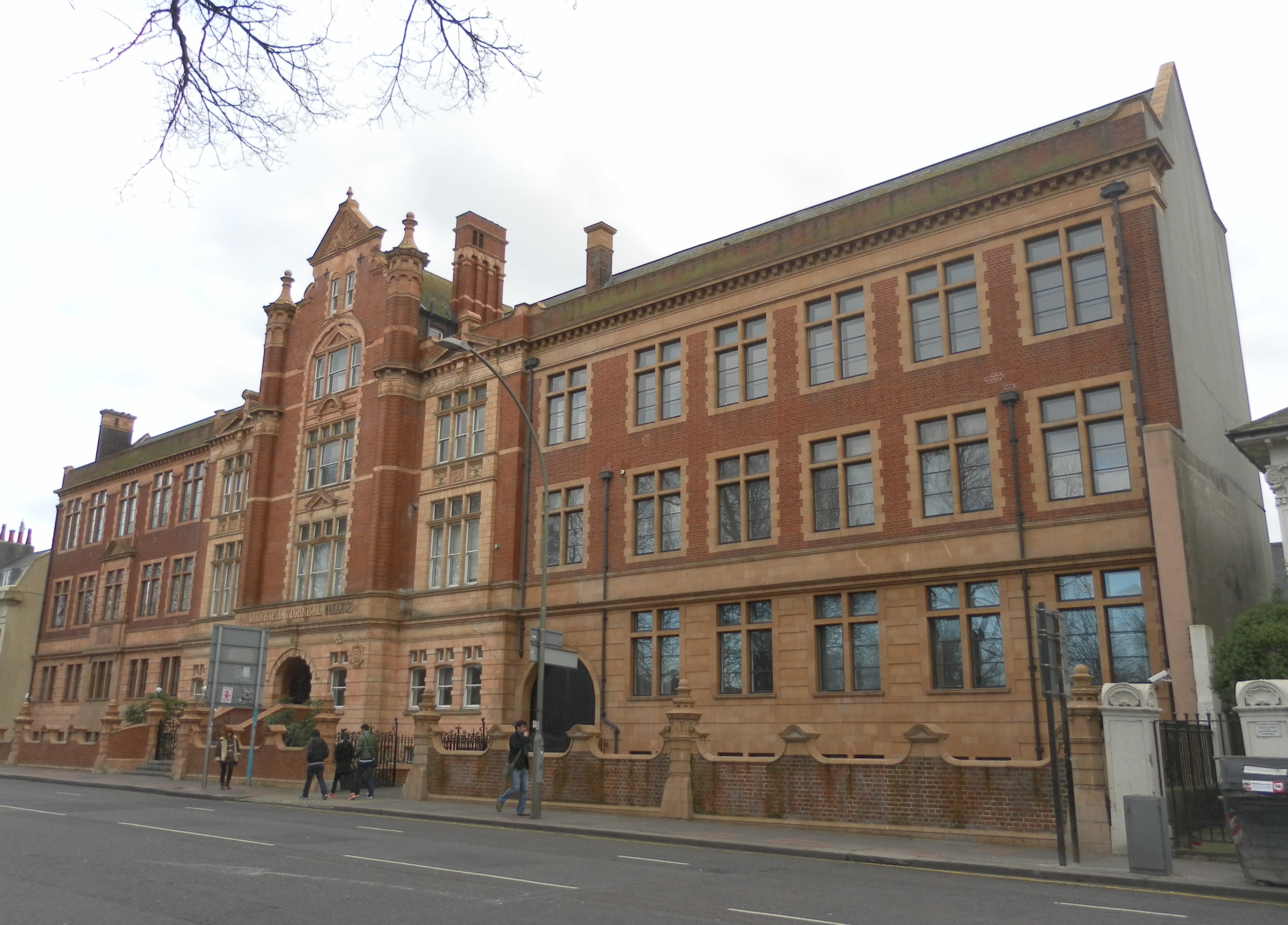
The former Municipal Technical College (1895–96) is loosely Jacobean in style.

Brighton College is the only surviving building in the city by George Gilbert Scott: his Brill's Baths have been demolished. Many additions have been made to his 14th-century Gothic-style flint and Caen stone complex, on which work started in 1848. The design has been criticised by Harry Stuart Goodhart-Rendel and Nikolaus Pevsner, who called the ensemble "joyless" and preferred T.G. Jackson's "lavishly Gothic" additions of 1886–87, in which terracotta was used extensively. BHASVIC is a "splendid" former grammar school on Old Shoreham Road in Prestonville. Designed by Samuel Bridgman Russell in 1911–12, in a Neo-Georgian/Queen Anne style with extensive red brickwork and wings joined to a central section by a series of staircases lit by round windows), it occupies a prominent corner site and retains its original iron gates with the emblems of Hove and Brighton Boroughs and East and West Sussex. The Municipal Technical College on Richmond Terrace, north of Grand Parade (now flats) was designed in 1895–96 by the Brighton Borough Surveyor Francis May. Extensions of 1909 and 1935 were in a complementary style with brick and dark terracotta, and the whole complex has been described as "Free Jacobean" in style. Roedean School (1898–99), a girls' boarding school high on the cliffs towards Ovingdean, is a Free Jacobean composition by John William Simpson. From the centre of the symmetrical range rise two identical towers. Several wings then project forwards from this central block, each with a large gable end. Simpson also designed the chapel in 1906, a sanatorium in 1908 and a library in 1911. Hubert Worthington worked on a dining room extension in the 1960s. St Mary's Hall, a private school affiliated to Roedean but closed since 2011, has a symmetrical façade with prominent gables and mullioned windows. The design resembles simplified Tudor Revival, although it is early for that style (George Basevi designed it in 1836).

Most secondary schools in the city date from the 20th century and have been extended regularly: examples include Patcham High School, Longhill High School at Ovingdean, Hove Park School and Blatchington Mill School. The last two and Varndean School in Brighton were given £3 million between them in 1999–2000 to undertake major extensions because of the expanding school-age population in the city. Cardinal Newman Catholic School in Hove dates from 1870 to 1872 and was originally a convent. Frederick Pownall designed the original Gothic Revival buildings, which have been added to many times in the 20th century. There is also a Gothic Revival chapel of 1878. Exterior features include a large oriel window above the entrance, with prominent mullions and transoms, and an array of tile-hung gables. Falmer High School was rebuilt in 2010–11 as the Brighton Aldridge Community Academy to the design of Feilden Clegg Bradley Studios. Plum-coloured and "chalky white" brick elevations join on the east side "like an elaborate scarf joint"; the north face is mostly glass, while the south side burrows into the hillside. Flint is also used, reflecting the downland location. The exterior walls are curved, and the timber-clad interior is open-plan and made up of many interconnecting spaces. The building won the Royal Institute of British Architects' Regional Sustainability Award in 2012. The Varndean campus of educational buildings, which includes primary, secondary and tertiary institutions, is centred on Gilbert Murray Simpson's Neo-Georgian quadrangled Varndean College of 1929–31.

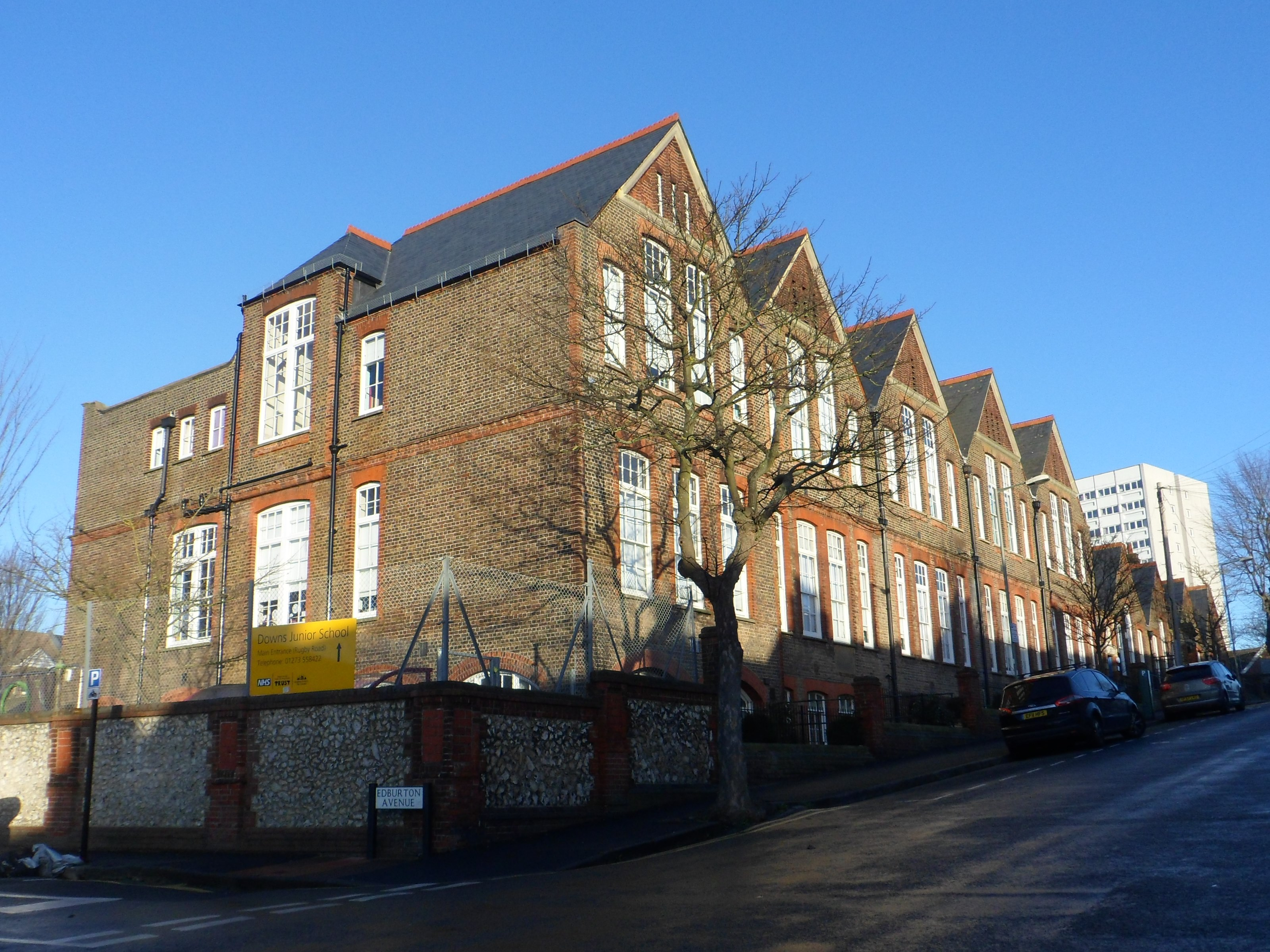
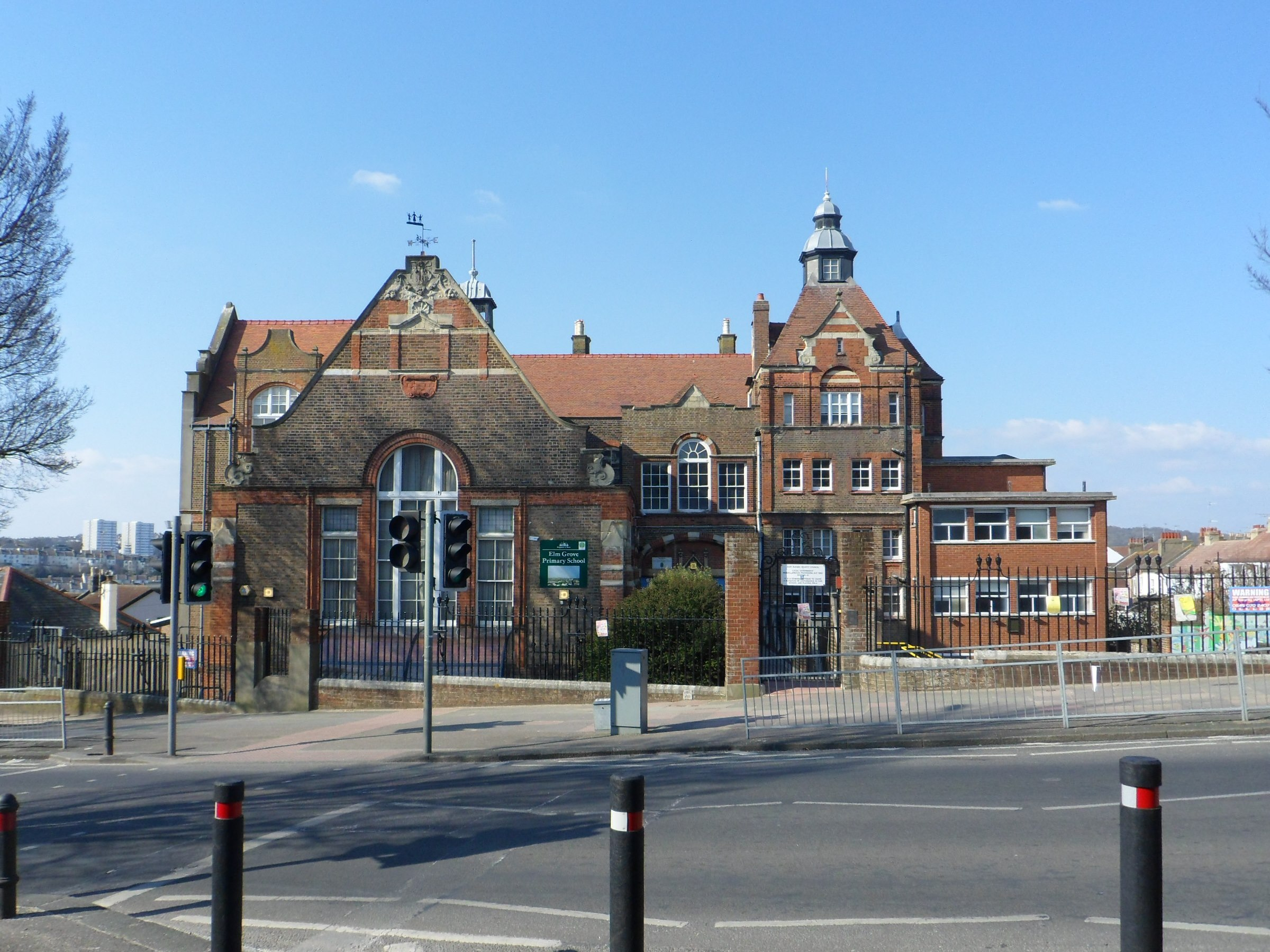
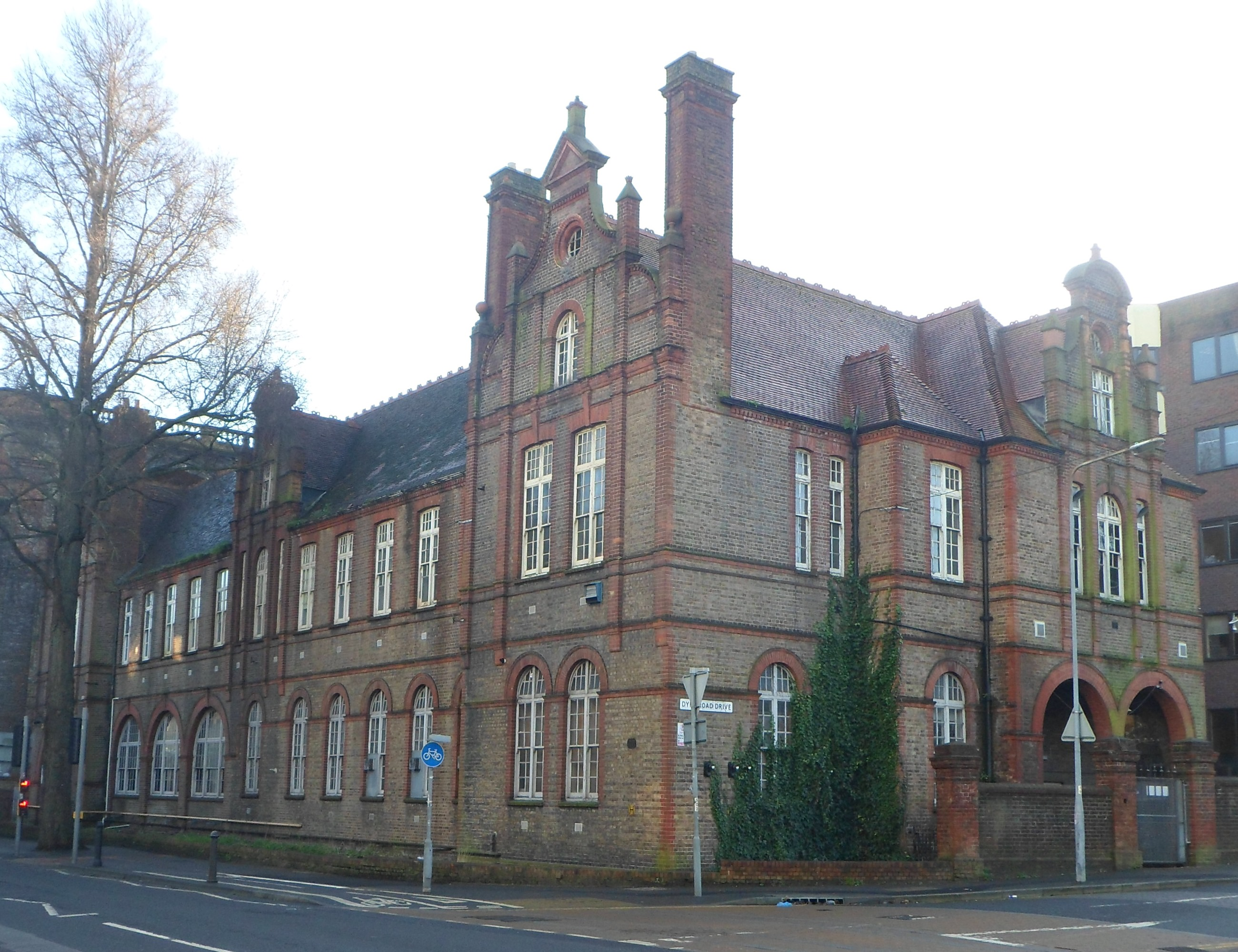
Thomas Simpson's board schools include those at Rugby Road, Elm Grove (both 1893) and Preston Road (1880) (pictured left to right).

Gilbert Murray Simpson originally worked with his father in the firm Thomas Simpson & Son. Thomas Simpson's former board schools of the post-1870 period (most were designed between 1880 and 1903) can be found throughout the city. Architecturally, his schools are "the best [such] works" in Sussex. His style evolved from the Queen Anne Revival typical of early board schools towards "an Edwardian Free style" in which the standard red brickwork is supplemented by pebbledashing, terracotta and stonework. His rooflines became more elaborate over time as well. The Finsbury Road School (1881; now flats) combines red and brown brickwork. Connaught Road School in Hove (1884) and Elm Grove School in Brighton (1893) are in the Queen Anne Revival style; the former, now an adult education centre, combines yellow and red brick and terracotta-coloured render to create an "elegant" and "distinctive" façade. Clayton & Black extended the building in 1903. York Place School has been dated to c. 1895 and has two frontages; it is now integrated into City College Brighton & Hove's buildings, which are scheduled for redevelopment. In Preston parish, Simpson built the Preston Road School (1880, with "flamboyant pedimented gables" and a large roof), the Downs School (a simpler building of 1890) and the dome-topped Stanford Road School (1893), which also has a tower. Simpson's last board school, St Luke's at Queen's Park, was also the most elaborate. Dated 1900–03, it has a separate swimming pool and caretaker's house, all in the same "characterful Edwardian Free style". The extravagant t-shaped design features two wings with entrances set below timber-turreted towers, four gables to the rear, and an ornately decorated arched window in the third wing (the base of the t). Much use was made of stone.

Aside from the former board schools, the city has many other primary schools in a range of styles. St Christopher's School in Aldrington is housed in "one of the most intact of a series of large 1880s villas" that characterise the New Church Road area. Original features include iron fixtures and stained glass. Portslade Infants School was designed by E.H.L. Barker and opened on 23 July 1903. The building has distinctive polychromatic walls with bands of red, black and blue bricks, and the steep roof continues this pattern by contrasting red tiles against black slates. In contrast, the nearby St Nicolas' Church of England School, designed by the architect of St Bartholomew's Church Edmund Scott in 1867, is a simple Gothic Revival building of flint. (Note: The 1903 building is now disused; the 1867 building took the name Brackenbury Primary School in 2013.) Anthony Carneys' design for the new Aldrington Church of England Primary School (1991) consisted of a "cluster of buildings with a Dutch barn feel to the roofline" and a rural ambience, despite the urban location. The red-tiled, steeply pitched gabled roofs have inbuilt windows including an oculus, and the walls are of yellow and red brick.

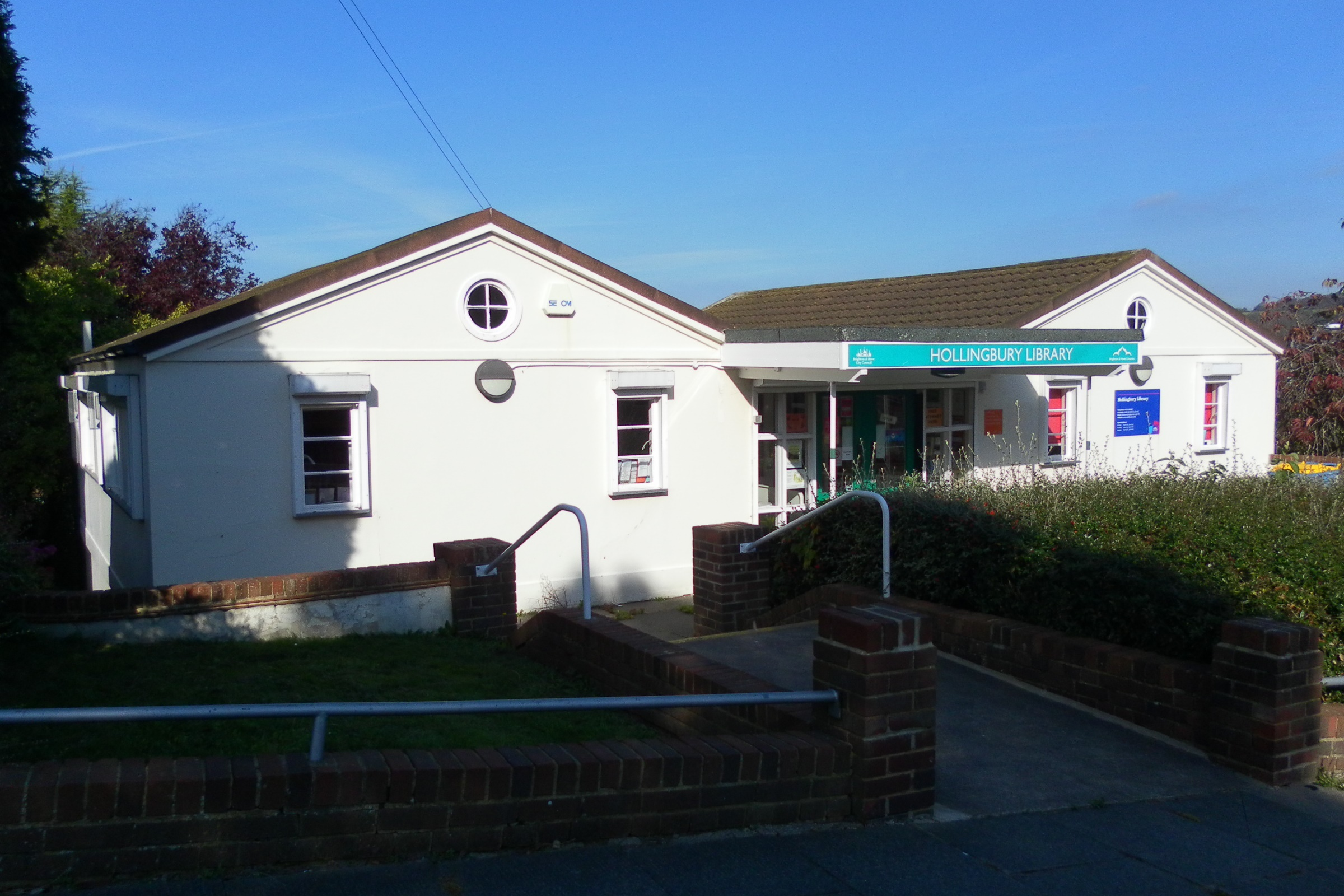
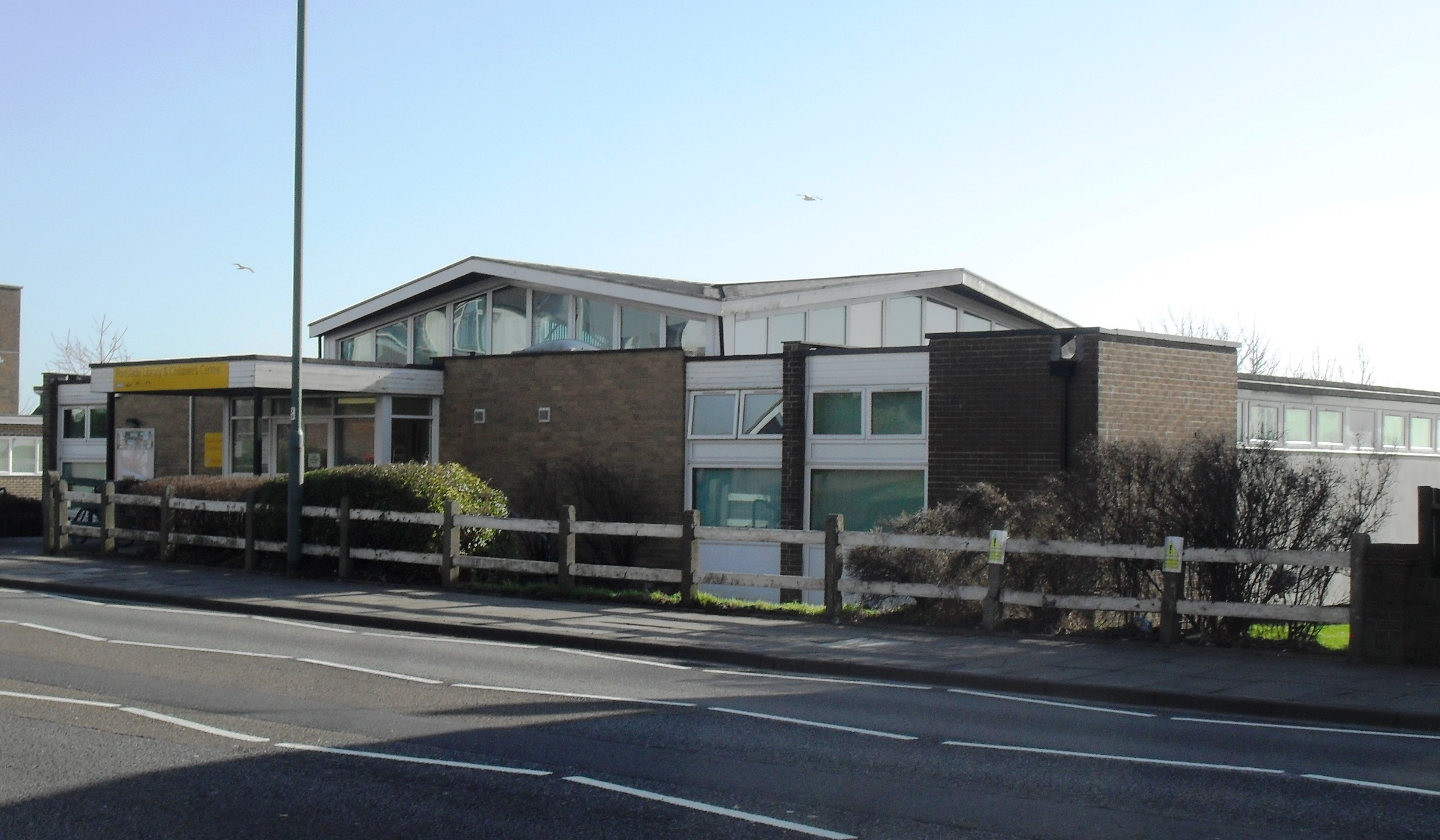
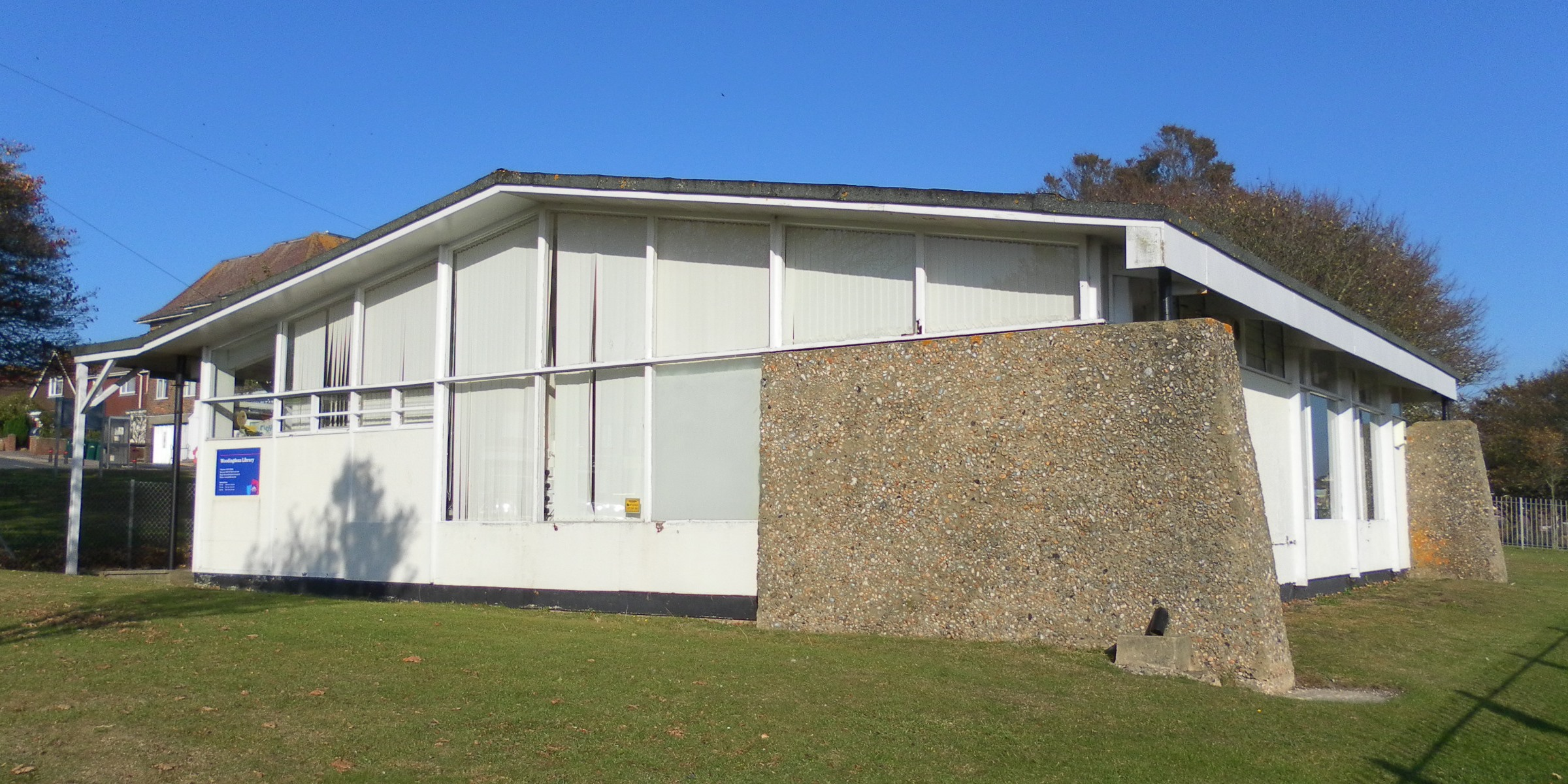
Pictured left to right: Postwar libraries include Hollingbury, Portslade and Woodingdean (demolished 2013).

Throughout East Sussex, few original libraries survive in use. In Brighton and Hove, only Hove's central library (1907–08, by Leeds architects Percy Robinson and W. Alban Jones) remains with little alteration. The "highly inventive" Edwardian Baroque design features a domed upper storey and a rotunda at the rear. The façade has egg-and-dart moulding. Brighton's central library used to be in the early-19th-century complex of buildings designed by William Porden, which later became Brighton Museum & Art Gallery. Distinguished by excellent interior tiling, it had long been too small but was not replaced until Jubilee Library opened in February 2005. Bennetts Associates and Lomax, Cassidy & Edwards designed the "carefully wrought but nonetheless striking" building—a highly glazed "box" with a prominent brise soleil and side elevations laid with dark blue tiles resembling mathematical tiles. As the main element in the regeneration of North Laine, it has been called "the most important public building constructed in Brighton since the Royal Pavilion". Portslade Library, built in 1964, was "a typical Sixties creation" with little regard for disabled access: it was built on a sloping site, and steps lead down from the road to the entrance. Its Modernist design drew comparison locally with Sputnik. Hangleton's library (opened in 1962, although Hove Borough Surveyor T.R. Humble's plans date from 1958) is integrated into a residential building, and the same applies at Coldean. The Archadia firm of architects designed a ground-floor library of 290 square feet (27 m^{2}) with six housing association flats above, in which the windows are emphasised by panels of pale brick. The complex opened in June 2008, replacing the original library of 1975. Moulsecoomb library was designed by Percy Billington in 1964; its large roof seems to "float" as it overhangs the small single-storey structure. Other modern libraries include Patcham (1933; extended in 2003), Westdene (1964) and Woodingdean (1959), for which planning permission to demolish and rebuild on a larger scale to include a doctor's surgery was sought in 2012. Rottingdean's library is housed in the former vicarage, Saltdean's is part of Saltdean Lido, and Hollingbury library occupies the former County Oak pub (1950) which was made up of two prefabricated buildings.

=== Leisure and entertainment buildings ===
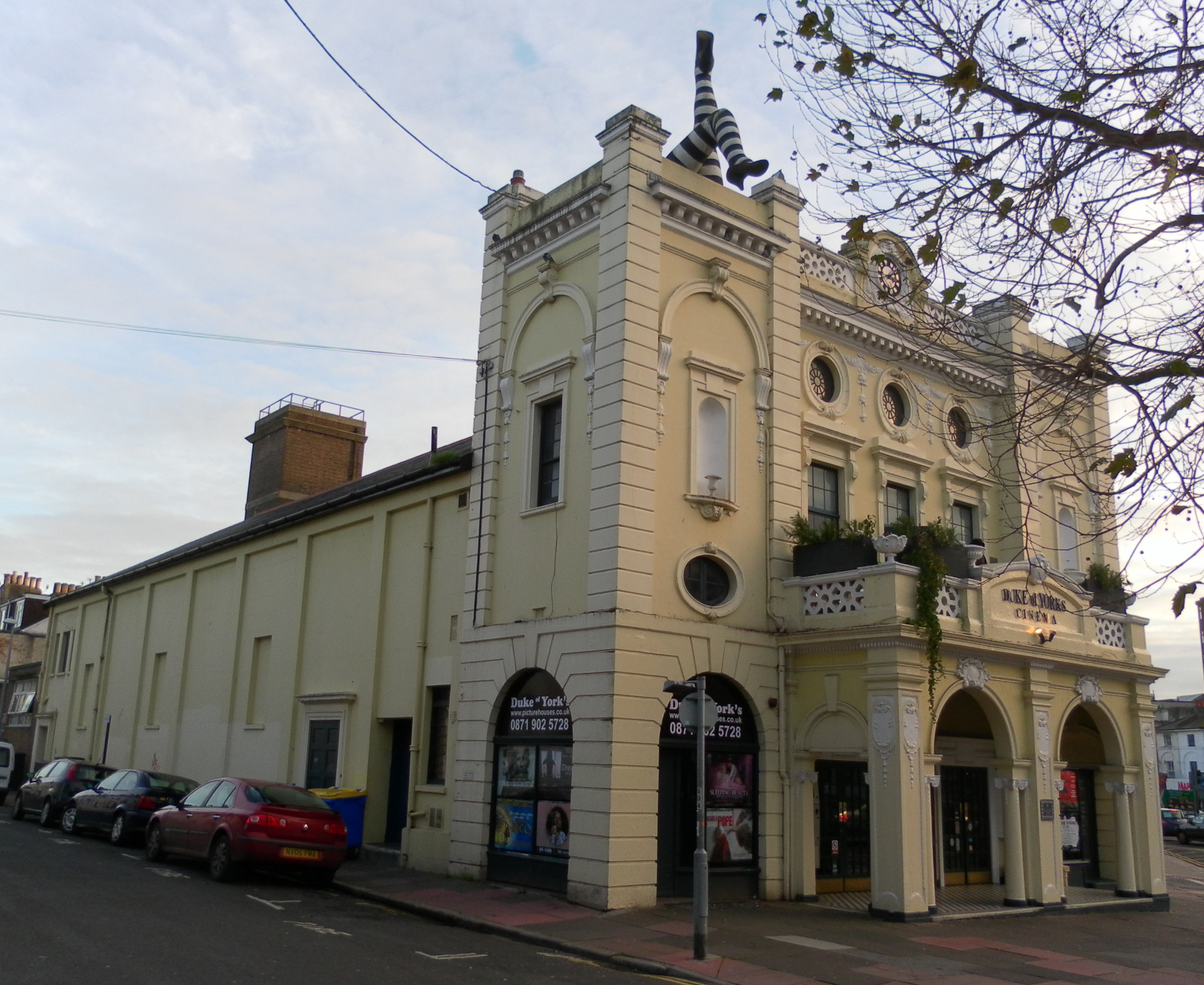
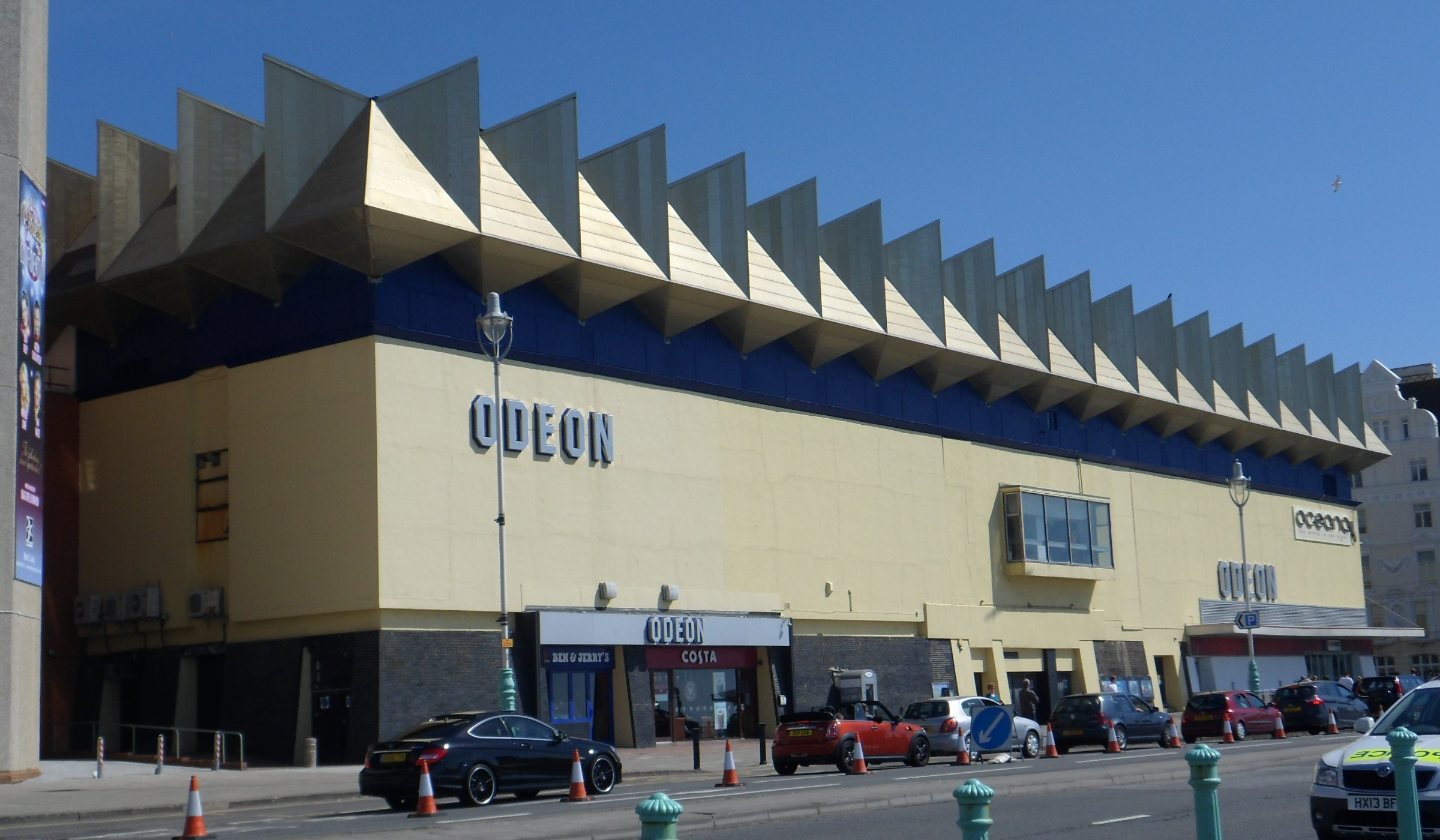
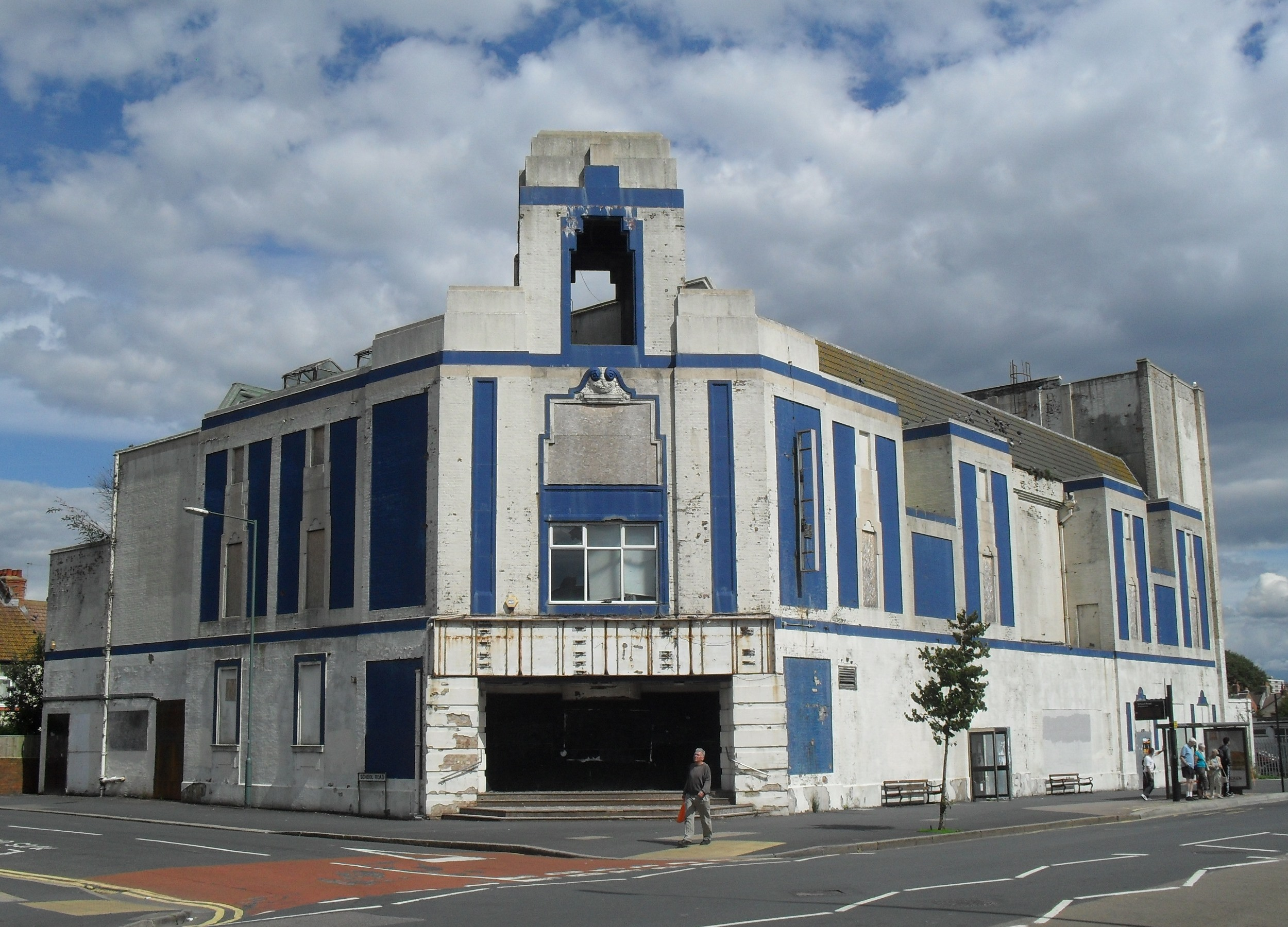
Pictured left to right: The Duke of York's Picture House has been in continuous use since 1910; the Odeon Kingswest Cinema opened in 1973; but the Granada in Aldrington was demolished in 2012.

The Duke of York's Picture House is the oldest cinema still operating in England, and was one of the world's first when it opened in September 1910. It is next to the fire station at Preston Circus and occupies the site of a 19th-century brewery. The architects were Clayton & Black. There are some Classical and Palladian touches on the elaborately decorated façade, notably in the four-arch colonnade, but the overall style is Baroque. The symmetrical front elevation has full-height rusticated pilasters on the two end bays, giving them the appearance of towers. The "monumental" Savoy Cinema (1930, by William Glen) just behind the seafront was later converted into a casino. The 3,000-capacity building has a tall and prominent entrance in a free Art Deco style with some Classical touches. Its Sussex bricks were given a white glaze, and the building was nicknamed "the white whale". "The most impressive of Brighton's interwar cinemas", though, was the Regent—designed in 1921 by Robert Atkinson and replaced in 1974 by a commercial development. It was Classical-style inside and out (the interior was the work of Walpole Champneys) and had a winter garden just below the roof. Its replacement was the Odeon Kingswest, converted in 1973 from the Russell Diplock Associates-designed Brighton Top Rank Centre of 1965. The "intrusively aggressive" Brutalist structure has no windows and a low, "emphatically horizontal" appearance, but its jagged roofline of bronze-coated aluminium shapes give it prominence on its corner site. "Hove's most opulent cinema" (and its only purpose-built one) was the Granada (1933) at Portland Road in the Aldrington area. F.E. Bromige designed the Art Deco building, whose "striking angular tower" and corner site made it a landmark. The Art Deco theme continued inside. Closure came in 1974 and the building became a bingo hall. It was demolished in 2012 in favour of a mixed-use development. Another 1930s cinema that became a bingo hall in the 1970s and later closed is the Astoria Theatre on Gloucester Place in Brighton. Demolition was authorised in 2012, although as it was a Grade II-listed building the final decision lay with national government. Demolition, again for a mixed-use development, began in April 2018. Edward A. Stone designed the building in a French Art Deco style with a steel-framed interior clad in pale stone blocks decorated with faience.

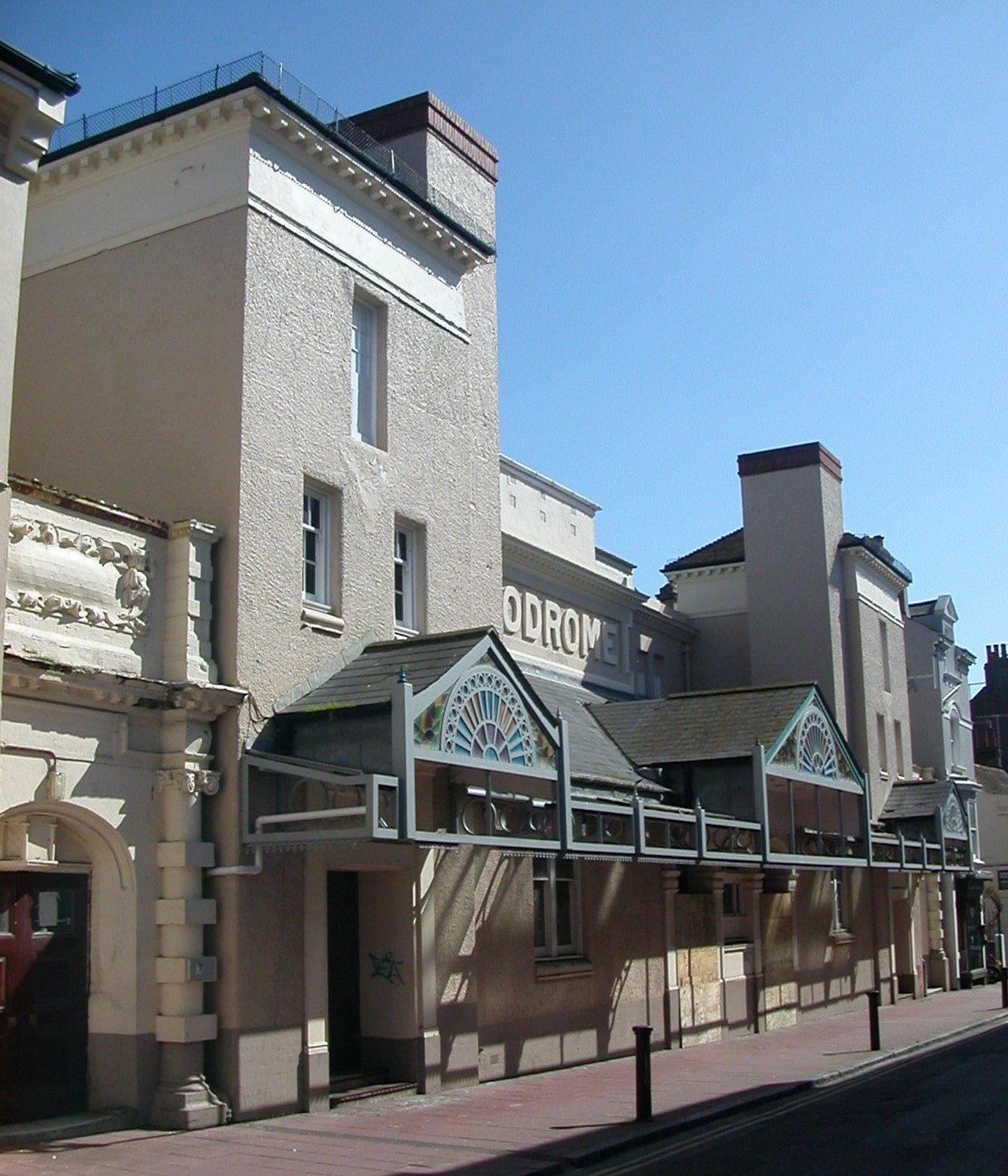
The Brighton Hippodrome's present appearance dates from 1901, when Frank Matcham altered it.

The Brighton Dome complex incorporates the Studio Theatre, Corn Exchange and a concert hall. It has occupied its large corner site at the junction of Church Street and New Road in North Laine since William Porden built it for the Prince Regent in 1804–08. Borough Surveyor Philip Lockwood converted the buildings into an entertainment complex in 1867–73, then the next Surveyor Francis May and theatre architect Robert Atkinson did more work in 1901–02 and 1934 respectively. Atkinson's additions included the theatre, which faces New Road. All of these schemes retained the Indian/Islamic architectural influences of Porden's work. Atkinson gave the concert hall an Art Deco interior, while May's interior work was "of an eclectic Neo-Jacobean kind". Also on New Road is the Theatre Royal, another early-19th-century building remodelled several times subsequently. Charles J. Phipps extended the theatre in 1866, and Clayton & Black gave the building its present appearance in 1894. Their work includes a colonnade of cast iron columns of the Corinthian order, an exterior of "vivid red brick" and a series of dome-topped turrets on the roofline. The former Brighton Hippodrome in The Lanes was designed as an ice rink in 1897, but Frank Matcham converted it into a theatre and indoor circus in 1901–02. Elaborate Rococo-style interior decoration and Royal Pavilion-style onion domes above the stage contrast with a low-key exterior with short towers at each end and a coloured glazed awning. Elsewhere, the Brighton Little Theatre occupies a Classical-style stuccoed former Baptist chapel of 1833, and the Emporium Theatre uses the former London Road Methodist Church-a Free Renaissance-style building designed in 1894 by James Weir and extended and refaced in 1938.

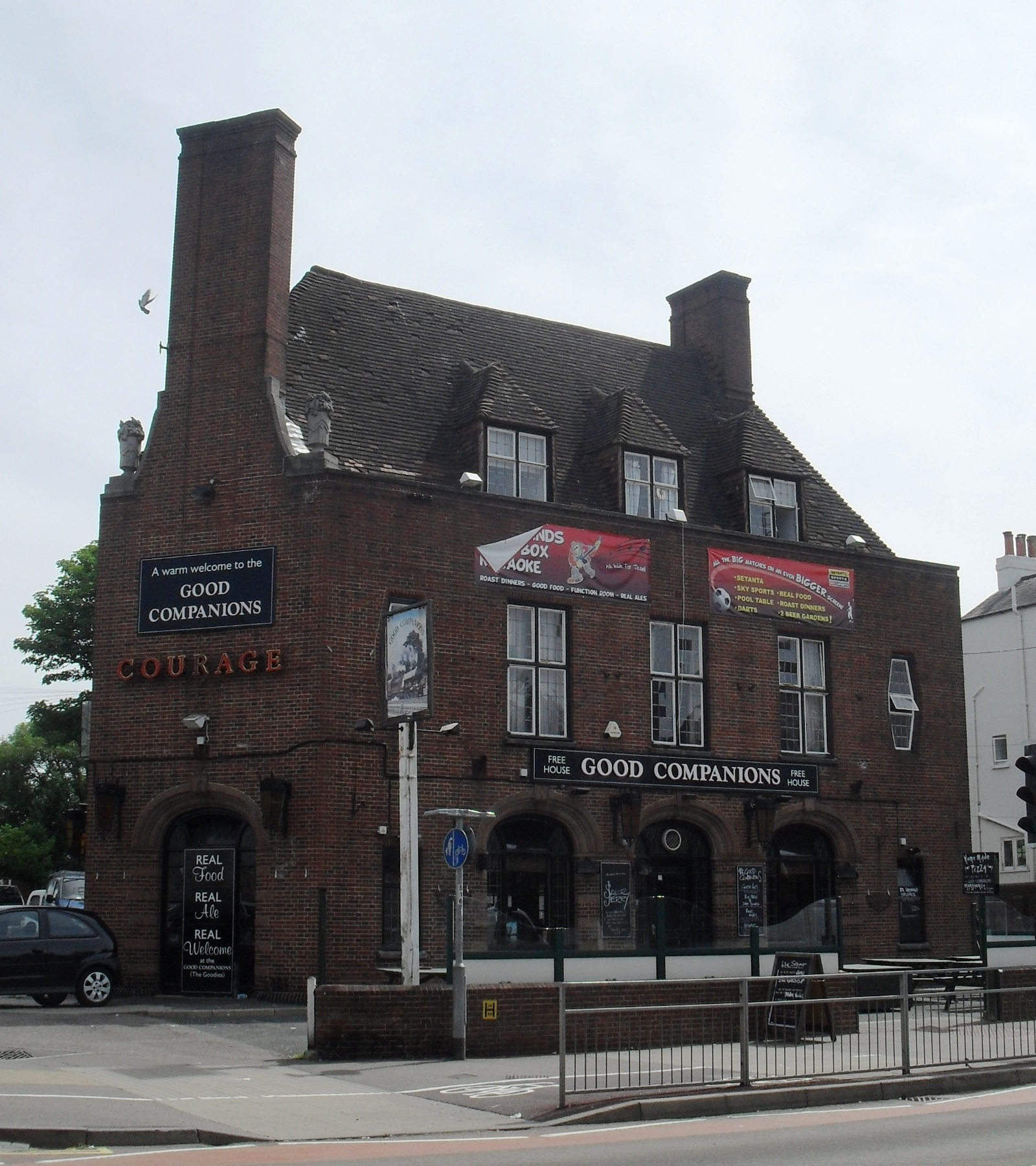
The Good Companions pub dates from 1939.

Brighton in particular has a wide range of pubs. Good examples of interwar pub architecture include the Neo-English Renaissance Good Companions (1939) on Dyke Road at Seven Dials, designed by the Tamplins Brewery's in-house architect Arthur Packham and featuring characteristic 1930s patterned brickwork, the Ladies Mile Hotel (1935) on Patcham's Ladies Mile estate, and Clayton & Black's ostentatious rebuild of the King and Queen on Marlborough Place. Their 1931 design borrowed freely from Tudor vernacular elements, both standard and decorative: it features jettying, massive timber lintels, corbels in the form of gargoyles, elaborate carvings and a portcullis. Also in central Brighton, the J D Wetherspoon-owned Bright Helm pub occupies a former office building on a corner site in West Street. H.E. Mendelssohn's "bold design" of 1938 is often attributed incorrectly to his better known contemporary Erich Mendelsohn, as the curved stone and glass exterior evokes that architect's favoured Expressionist idioms. John Leopold Denman transformed the Freemasons Tavern in Brunswick Town from a Classical-style mid 19th-century pub, similar to its neighbours, into a spectacularly elaborate restaurant with an ornately moulded Art Deco interior and a blue and gold mosaic exterior with Masonic imagery and bronze fittings. Many older pubs in the city retain decorative reminders of the breweries to which they were tied. Examples of Tamplins Brewery pubs include the Jolly Brewer on Ditchling Road (mosaic panelling and etched windows), the Dyke Tavern in Prestonville (several etched windows, some with gold inlay), the Victory in The Lanes (a green tiled façade with tiled lettering and etched windows), the Seafield in Hove (lettered ironwork) and the former Free Butt on Phoenix Place (an inscribed stone panel), which was the brewery tap. The Connaught in Hove (1880) has a large panel advertising the Longhurst Brewery. (Note: This is the brewery at Preston Circus that was demolished to make way for the Duke of York's Picture House and the fire station.) Many Portsmouth & Brighton United Breweries pubs have green tiled façades and leadlights, including the Horse and Groom (Hanover), the Long Man of Wilmington (Patcham), the Montreal Arms (Carlton Hill) and the Heart and Hand (North Laine). Among nightclubs and similar venues, the building at 11 Dyke Road (latterly the New Hero club) stands out because of its elaborate French/Flemish Gothic Revival architecture. It was built as a school in 1867 to the design of local architect George Somers Leigh Clarke. The "freely inventive" building has red and brown brickwork, a steep roof and a prominent crow-stepped gable.

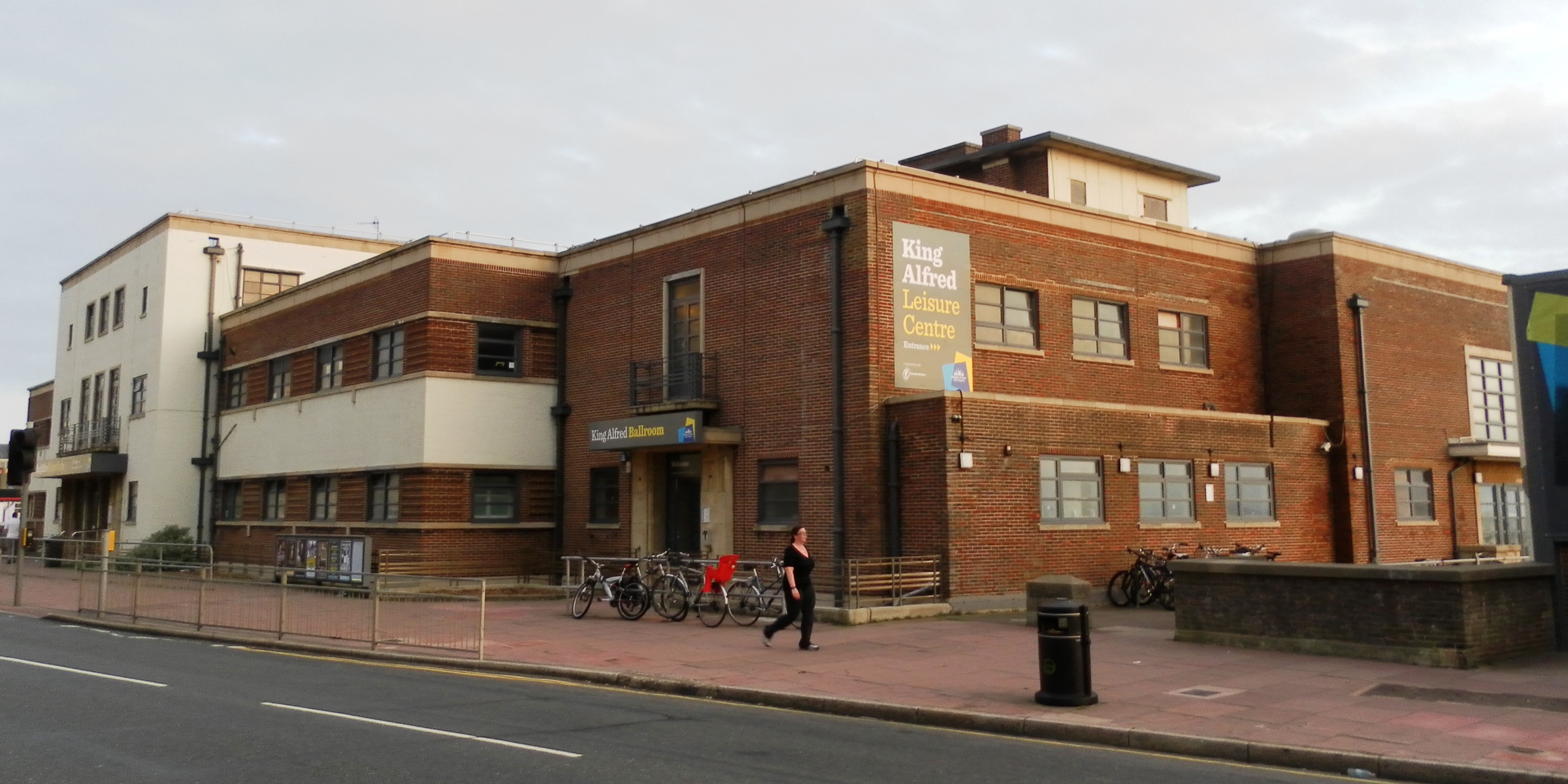
The King Alfred Centre occupies a seafront site in Hove.

Hove's main leisure venue is the King Alfred Centre on the seafront; facilities include swimming pools, gymnasia, a solarium and indoor sports. Hove Borough Surveyor T.H. Humble designed the first section (Hove Marina) in 1937, then the firm of Scott Brownrigg & Turner built a large extension in 1980–82. This faced particular criticism for its "dreadful" architecture and lack of harmony with its seafront location. Controversial plans for wholesale development to the design of Frank Gehry, featuring two skyscrapers, came to nothing. In Brighton, next to St Paul's Church and (latterly) the Top Rank Centre stood a well-loved leisure attraction called SS Brighton. Built in 1934 and demolished in 1965, it was successively a swimming pool, ice rink, general sports venue, variety theatre and conference venue. The exterior was Art Deco with a cream-coloured tiled façade, and the interior mimicked the design of an ocean liner. Only in 1990 was the site developed, with a "big and worthless hotel".

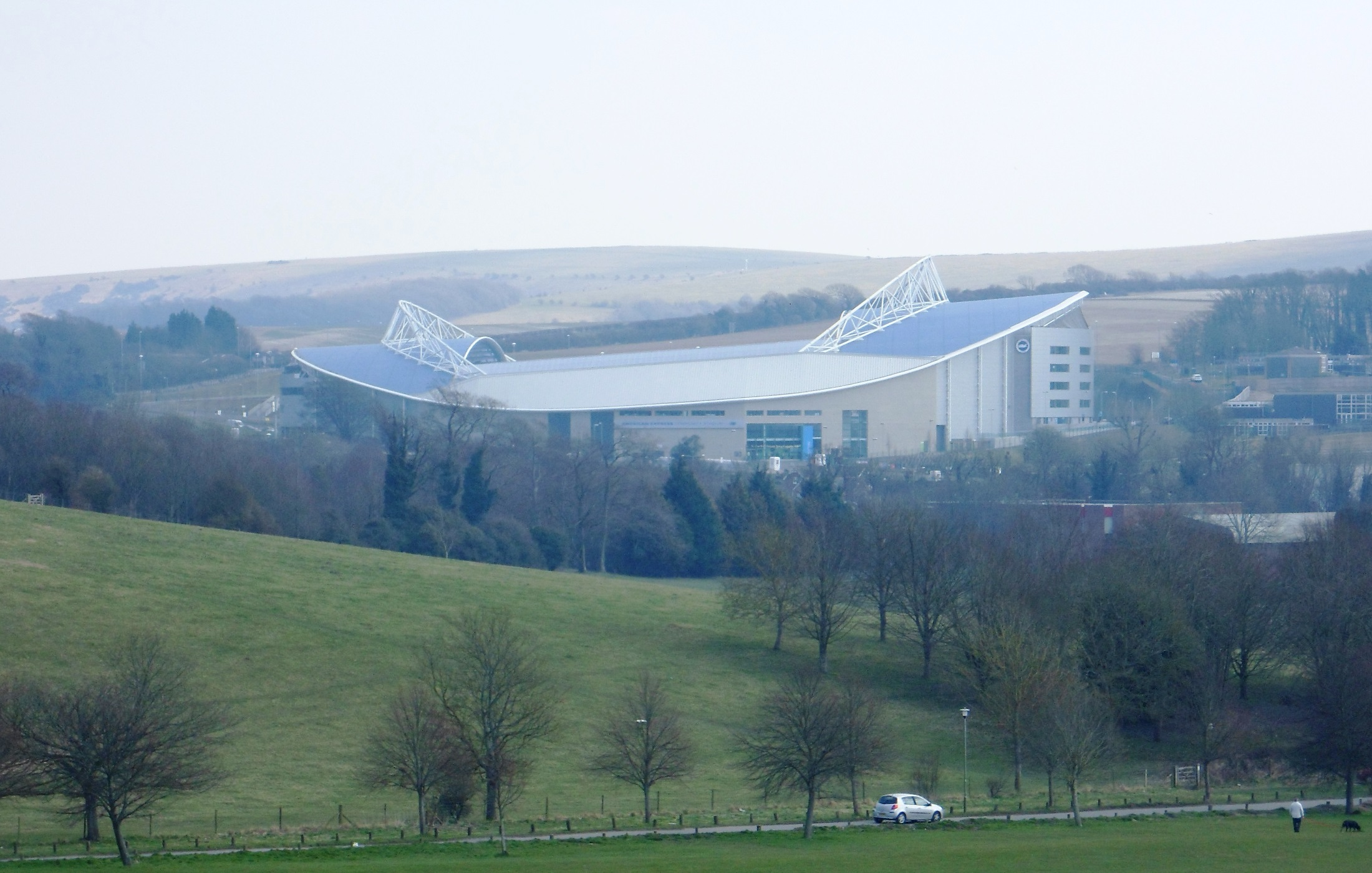
Brighton & Hove Albion F.C.'s Falmer Stadium sits low in the downland landscape on the edge of the city.

SS Brighton was also known as the Brighton Sports Stadium; genuine football stadiums used by Brighton & Hove Albion F.C. were the Goldstone Ground in Hove, the Withdean Stadium at Withdean and since 2011 the Falmer Stadium. The Goldstone Ground was laid out on the Stanford family's land in Hove in 1901 for Hove F.C. but was taken on by Albion in 1902. A.E. Lewer designed a pavilion and dressing rooms, and the West Stand was extended to the design of A. & W. Elliott in 1920. The South Stand was reused from an event at Preston Park. The stands were later replaced and refurbished several times, and floodlights were installed in 1961. The site was controversially sold in 1995 and is now occupied by the Goldstone Retail Park. Four vast warehouse-style units dominate the site. The Withdean Stadium, originally a tennis venue and later used for athletics, was used from 1999 until 2011: temporary stands were added for its new purpose. In 2011, the long-planned Falmer Stadium, on the edge of the city near the University of Sussex, was opened. It was designed and built in 2009–11 by KSS Design Group. Two "breathtaking" tubular arches support the steel and glass structure: they have no columnar support and a substantial breadth. The stadium is set low into the landscape and can be seen clearly from the surrounding downland. The Brighton & Hove Greyhound Stadium opened in 1928 on market garden land in West Blatchington, despite considerable opposition from Hove residents. In 1939 the grandstands were lengthened and the former kennels removed. New owners the Coral Leisure Group added a sports centre building in 1976–78 and a restaurant in the 1980s. One stand was taken down in 1991, the former tote building was converted into offices in 1993 and a major refurbishment took place in 2000.

=== Seafront architecture ===
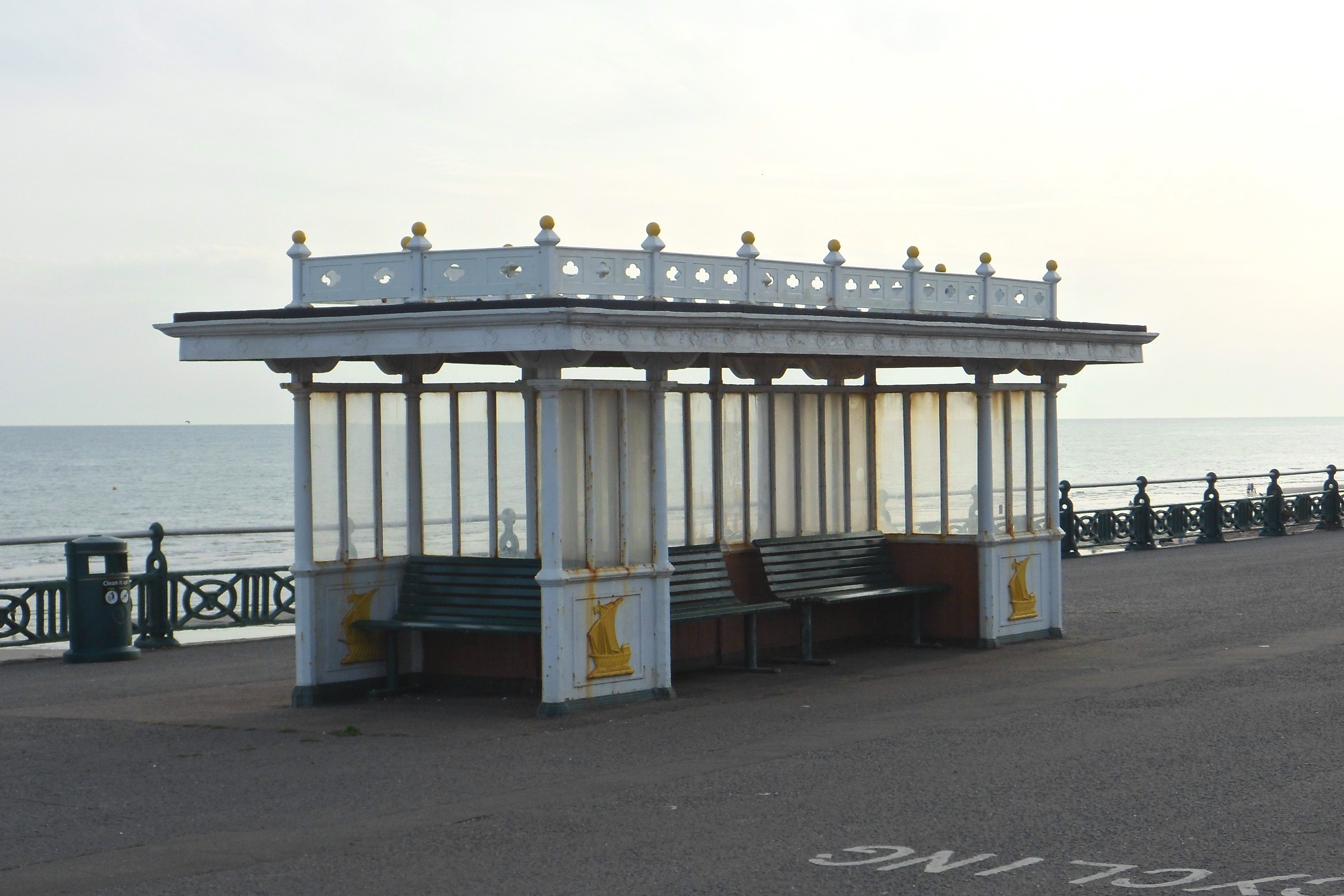
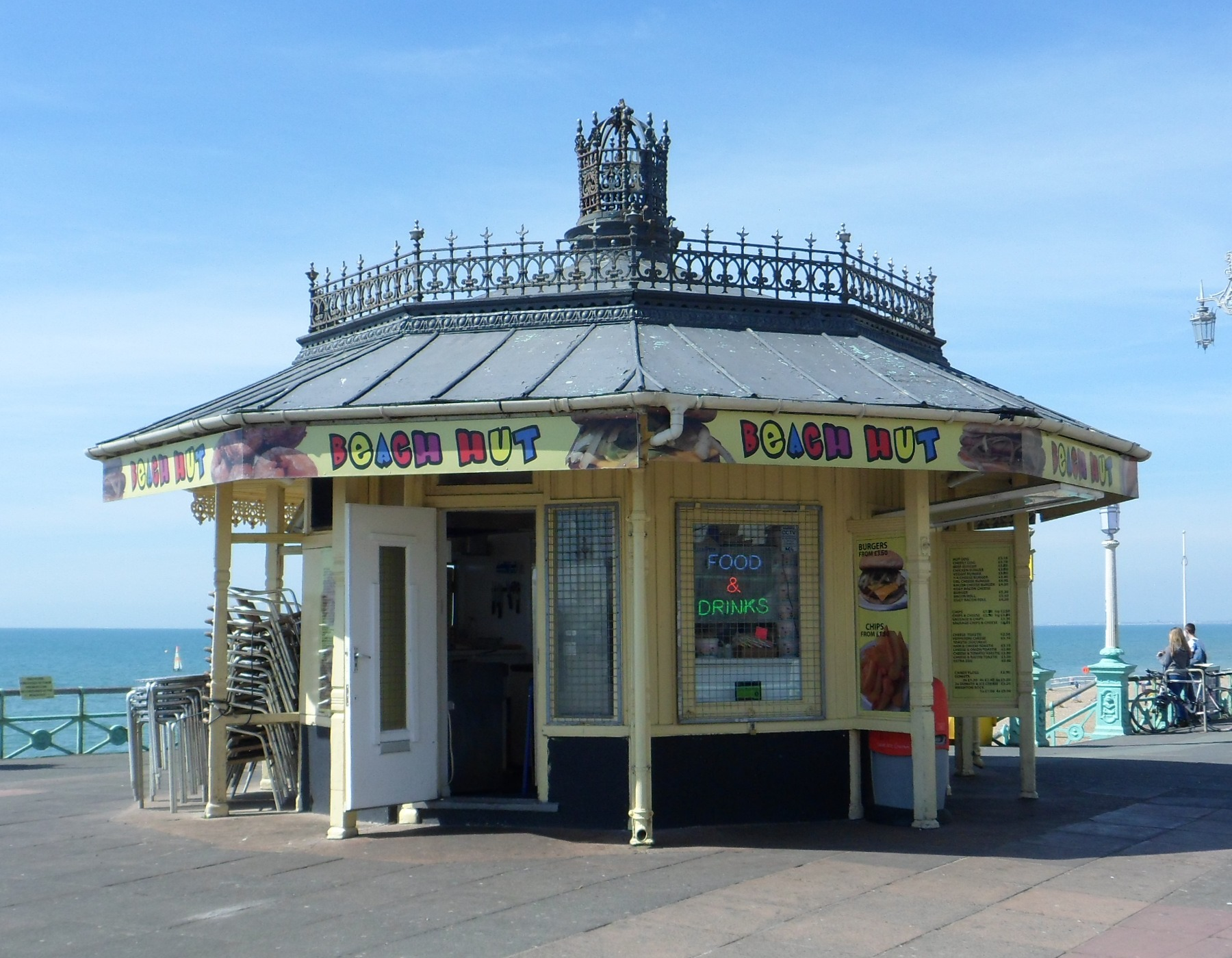
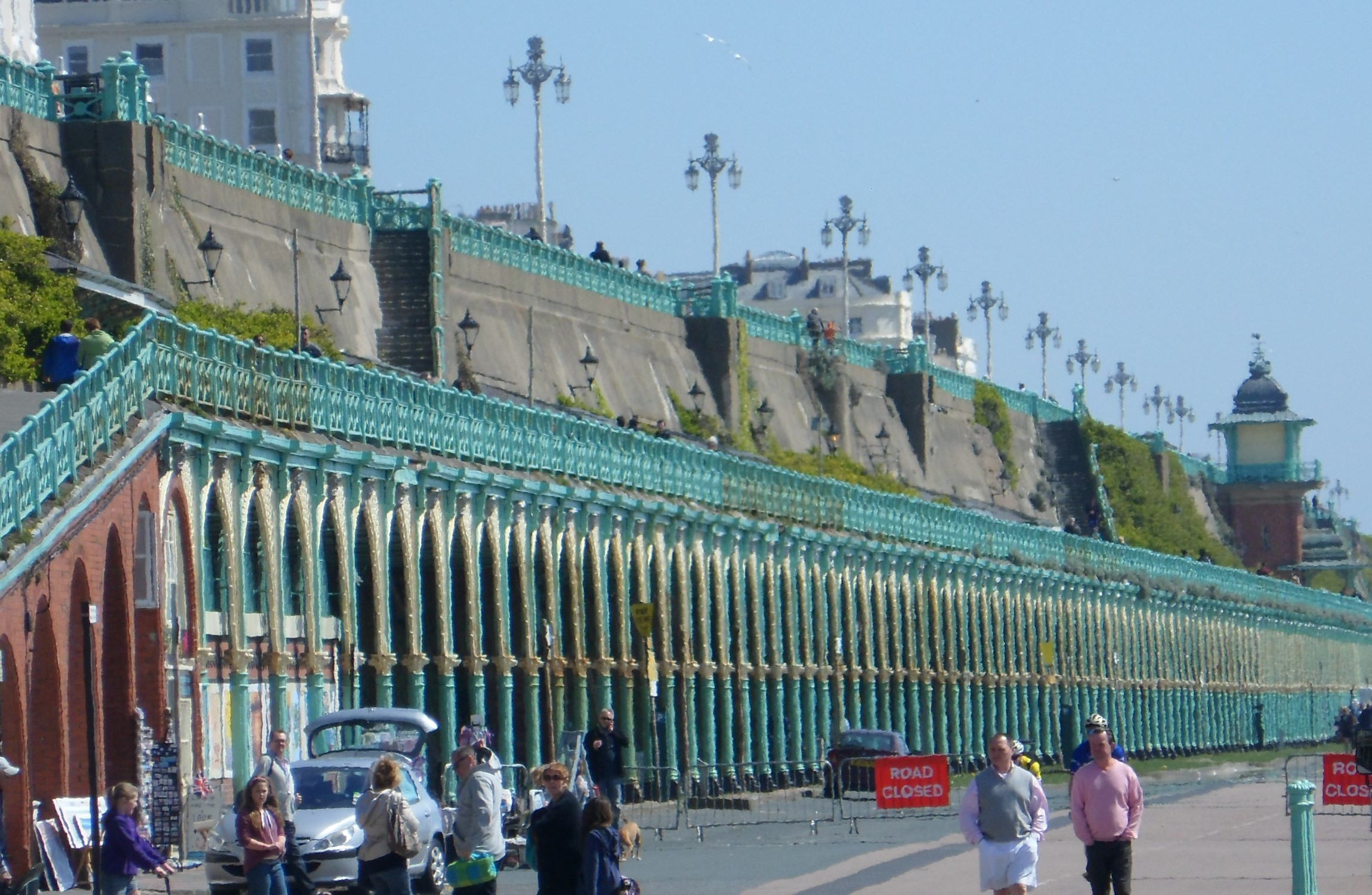
Ornate shelters and kiosks characterise Brighton and Hove seafront. Below the East Cliff runs a two-storey colonnade with a pagoda-roofed lift.

The seafront was originally dominated by defensive structures and batteries, including some designed by James Wyatt. As the threat of foreign invasion lessened in the 19th century, Brighton and Hove's seafront was redeveloped with pleasure and recreation as its focus, and from the 1860s it represented "the idée fixe of how [a seafront] should look". Bandstands, elaborately roofed kiosks, shelters with decorative awnings, pale green railings and tall, ornate lamp-posts are found regularly along the whole seafront; most structures date from the late 19th century and many are Grade II-listed.

The West Pier (1863–66 by Eugenius Birch), dedicated entirely to leisure and promenading, was "one of the most important piers ever built"—but after its closure in 1975 it decayed, caught fire twice and is now a rusting hulk stranded in the sea. Many of its features were innovative, from the screw pile foundations developed by Alexander Mitchell to the Royal Pavilion-inspired Orientalist kiosks and other buildings which defined how seaside architecture should be. Further dome-topped entertainment venues were added in 1893 and 1916; the first of these was built because a new rival had appeared closer to the centre of Brighton. Between 1891 and 1901, £137,000 was spent on the Palace Pier. (Note: Now branded Brighton Pier; originally called the Marine Palace Pier.) It was built by Arthur Mayoh to a design by R. St George Moore, and many additions were subsequently made—starting with an elaborate Winter Garden (now the Palace of Fun) by Clayton & Black in 1910–11. A funfair was built at the seaward end, 1,760 feet (540 m) from land, in 1938. Domes, elaborate kiosks and ornate columns characterise the pier.

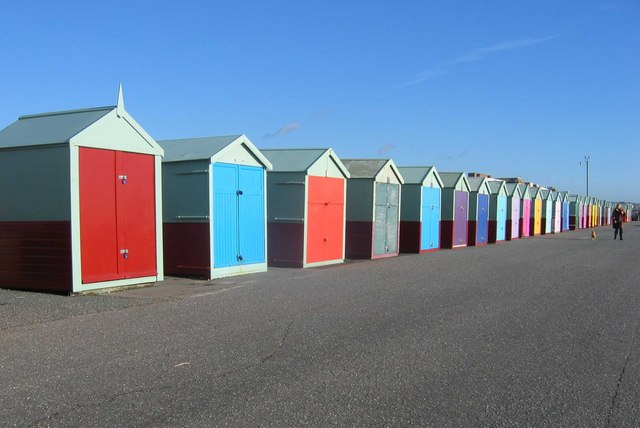
Hundreds of beach huts line Hove seafront.

Birch was also responsible for Brighton Aquarium (now the Sea Life Centre) in 1872. The 21-bay double-aisled interior remains as built, but of his High Victorian Gothic-style work on the exterior only an "attention-seeking clock tower" survives, (Note: This is no longer on the Aquarium: it was moved to the entrance of the nearby Palace Pier.) because the building was revamped in 1927–29 by the Borough Surveyor David Edwards. He rebuilt it in pale artificial stone in the Louis XVI Neoclassical style. Also in 1872, the long, straight Madeira Drive—which runs at sea level below the East Cliff—was greatly extended. Borough Surveyor Philip Lockwood designed a "superb" two-storey arcaded promenade alongside the cliff; it includes a pagoda-roofed lift to Marine Parade. Work took place in 1889–97, and Madeira Drive was extended further to Black Rock in 1905.

Brighton Marina at Black Rock dates from 1971 to 1976 and has little architectural interest: an "insipid neo-Regency" pastiche style was used for many of the residential buildings, and the wide range of commercial premises are dominated by a vast supermarket. Module 2 Architects drew up a masterplan for these buildings in 1985. Additional commercial development called The Waterfront (1999–2000 by Design Collective) pays no homage to existing architectural styles but has a "distinctive arched roofline". The Marina faced opposition when it was proposed, and a proposed development consisting of a 28-storey tower block and hundreds of other homes—first agreed in 2007 and signed off again in 2013—continues to cause controversy.

The esplanade at Hove is well known for its brightly coloured timber beach huts. The first were installed in around 1930, 290 were in place by 1936 and there are now several hundred.

=== Transport infrastructure ===
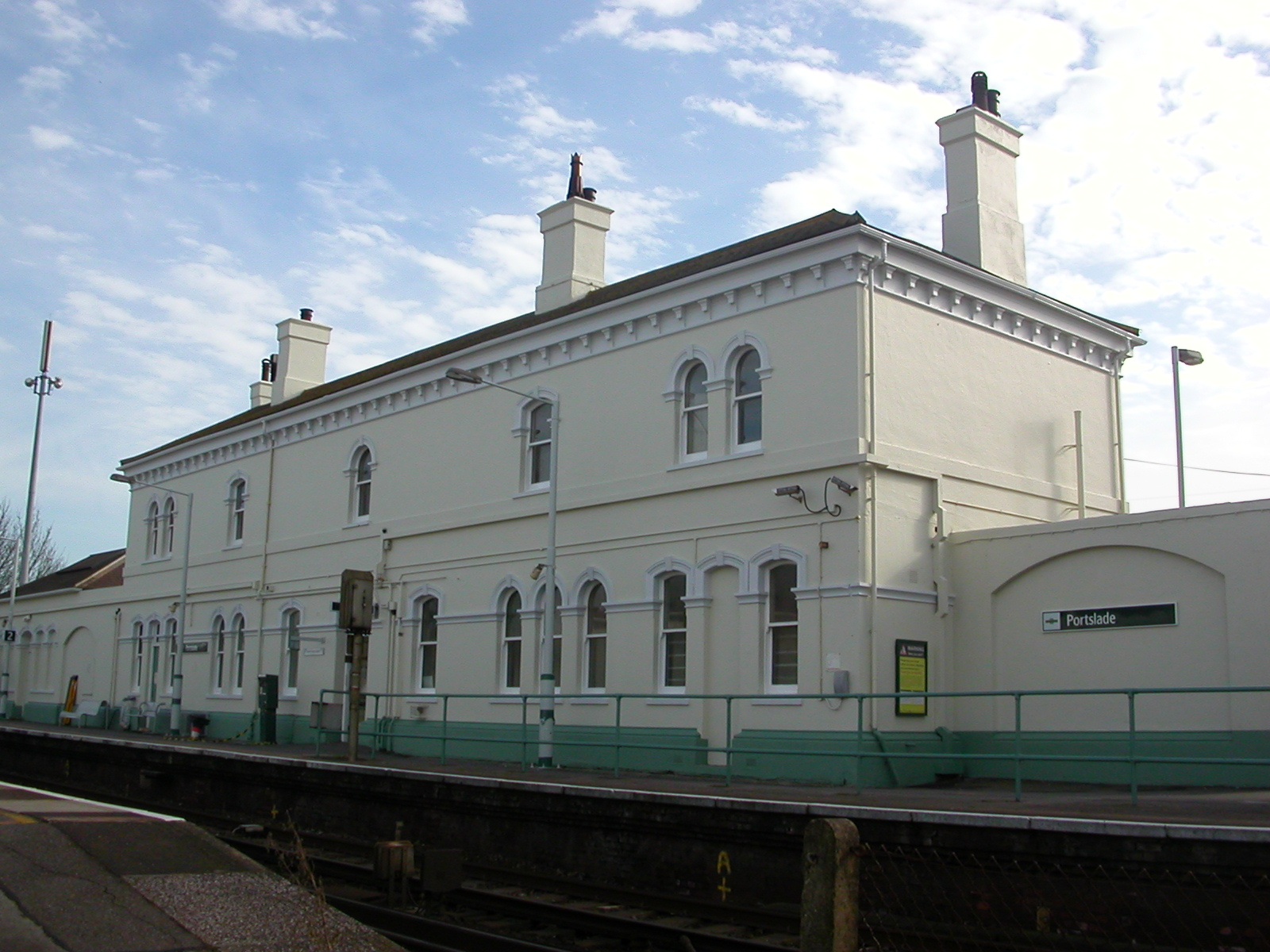
Portslade railway station has Italianate overtones.

Brighton railway station, a Grade II*-listed structure, was built in two parts. Most of David Mocatta's stuccoed Italianate building of 1841 survives—albeit hidden by H.E. Wallis's extensions of 1882–83. He added an elaborate iron porte-cochère over the forecourt and an impressive curved train shed, 21 bays and 597 feet (182 m) long, at the rear. Its glazed three-span roof is supported on octagonal fluted columns. F.D. Bannister, the chief architect of the London, Brighton and South Coast Railway (LBSCR), made other alterations at the same time, such as removing an entrance colonnade designed by Mocatta. The modern entrance has round-arched windows and doorways which recall its design. The roof was comprehensively restored in 1999–2000. Elsewhere in the city, the stations at Hove (original building), Kemp Town (demolished), London Road and Portslade were built to a common design in the 1850s–1870s. The "stately" two-storey buildings are Italianate, reminiscent of a Tuscan villa, and have symmetrical layouts. London Road station, by W. Sawyer in 1877, also has a wide staircase leading up to its entrance. Moulsecoomb, newly built in 1980, was designed by the Chief Architect's Department of the Southern Region of British Railways. Intended to be difficult to vandalise, it has two "well-detailed" Swiss chalet-style wooden and tiled buildings linked by a footbridge. Preston Park's platform-level buildings were replaced in 1974 by flat-roofed timber and glass structures, although the yellow-brick street-level entrance survives. Aldrington has basic shelters emphasising "utility rather than elegance".

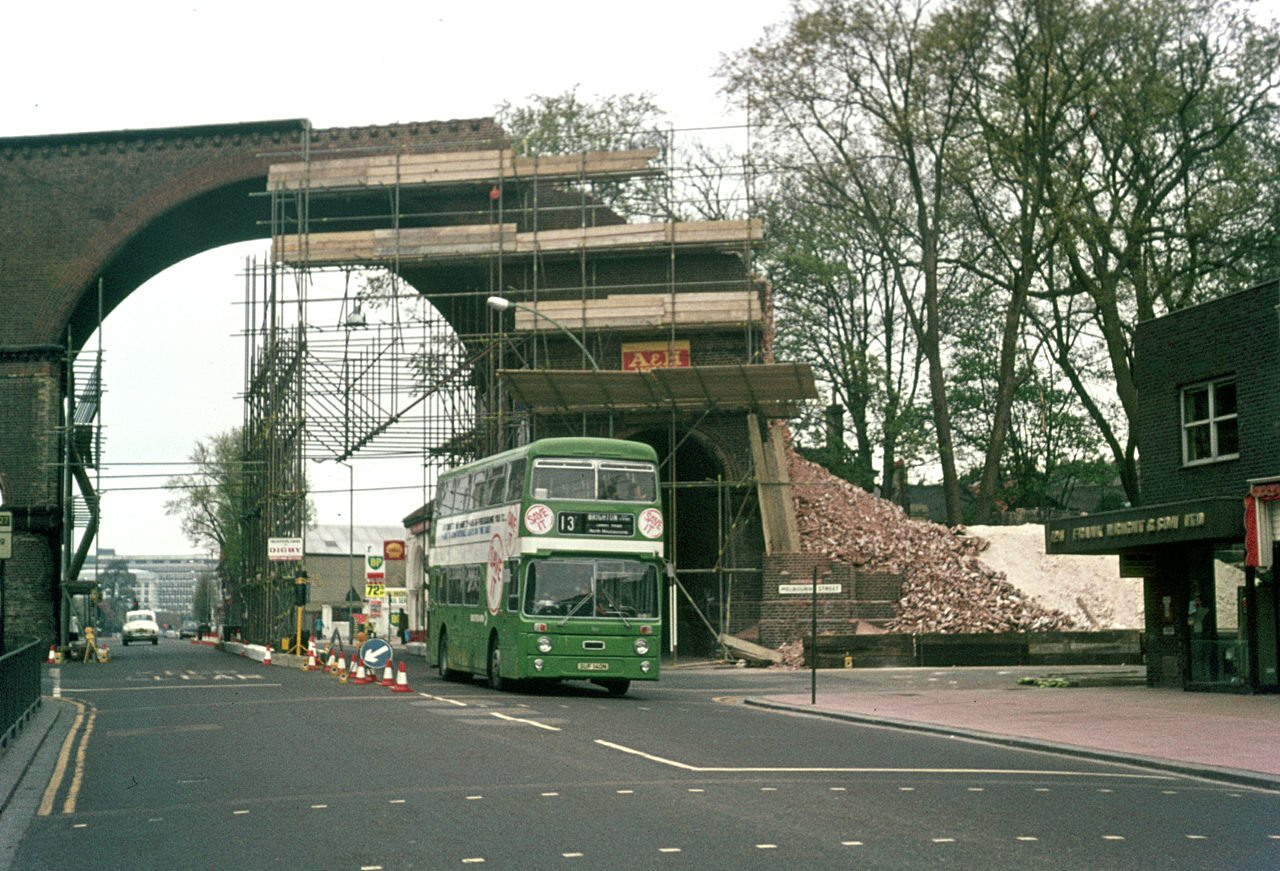
The Lewes Road viaduct was partly demolished in 1976 (pictured); the rest was cleared in 1983.

The Grade II*-listed London Road Viaduct (1846) by Rastrick used 10 million yellow and red bricks and spectacularly spanned the undeveloped valley until terraced houses crowded round it, and made it possible for the LBSCR to reach Lewes and Newhaven. The Builder of 1847 proclaimed Brighton to be "immensely improved" by the "exceedingly striking" structure. A cornice and balustrade runs along its 1,200-foot (370 m) length. Similar but smaller viaducts crossed Lewes Road (540 feet (160 m) and 28 arches; demolished in stages in 1976 and 1983) and Hartington Road (three arches; demolished in 1973) as part of the Kemp Town branch line. Further up Lewes Road, near Moulsecoomb, another Rastrick-designed viaduct of 1846 spans the dual carriageway at an acute angle. It is built of blue brick and has three segmental-arched openings. A concrete brace was inserted in one after wartime bomb damage. Two more viaducts, both Grade II-listed and designed by Rastrick, cross New England Road. The earlier, western viaduct (1839–41) carries the main line and was designed as a triumphal arch in stone and yellow brick. It was given full Masonic honours when built. A cast-iron arched bridge of 1851–1854, cast at the nearby Regent Foundry, carried the line to the goods yard and locomotive works. It consists of four parallel ribs forming an arch with open spandrels. There is a latticework parapet of iron and stone corbels. The works closed in the 1960s but the bridge was retained and now carries the Brighton Greenway, a traffic-free pedestrian route from London Road to the station.

Trams (from 1901) and trolleybuses used to run in Brighton. The Lewes Road Bus Garage was originally the Brighton Corporation Tramways depot; it retains windows etched with this name. Wooden tram shelters survive on Dyke Road, Ditchling Road and Queen's Park Road. They have been turned into bus shelters, and the same has happened in Old Steine with a series of trolleybus shelters designed in 1939 by Borough Surveyor David Edwards. The cream-coloured structures have curved windows and flat roofs with similarly curved ends which oversail the shelter itself. Their style is Streamline Moderne.

=== Monuments, memorials, and public art ===
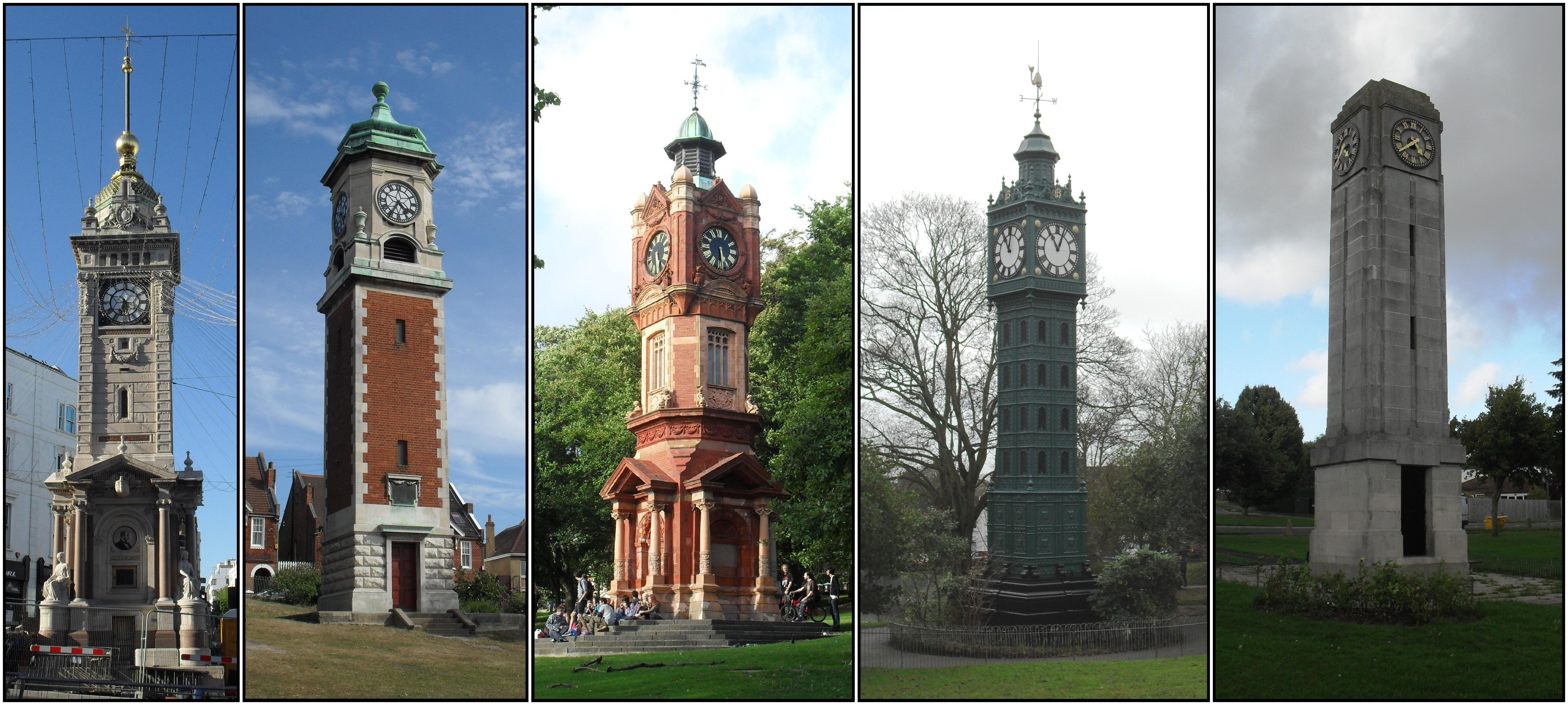
Left to right: Jubilee, Queen's Park, Preston Park, Blakers Park and Patcham clock towers

The city has an array of free-standing clock towers in various styles. The landmark Jubilee Clock Tower in the city centre has been called Brighton's "second best known symbol" after the Royal Pavilion; Preston Park, Queen's Park and Blakers Park each have one; and a fifth was erected in the 1930s in Patcham to publicise the suburb's Ladies Mile Estate. All except the Blakers Park and Patcham clock towers are Grade II listed. John Johnson's design for the Jubilee Clock Tower of 1888 combined the Classical style with Baroque motifs and some High Gothic elements. Pink granite, a copper fishscale dome, Corinthian columns and mosaic portraits of Royal Family members combine to give a "supremely confident and showy" design. The tower has withstood fierce criticism and calls for its demolition, and is now a widely appreciated landmark. Francis May's "pompous" clock tower, built in the newly laid out Preston Park in 1891–92, also combined some Classical and Gothic elements—this time using terracotta, pale brick and stone—but its style is closest in spirit to Neo-Flemish Renaissance. A copper dome with a weather-vane tops the four-stage tower. A London architect, Llewellyn Williams, won the commission for the Queen's Park clock tower in 1915; his three-stage design, on high ground, incorporates Portland stone (partly rusticated) and red brick, and also has a copper roof. Blakers Park, northeast of Preston Park, was laid out in 1893 when Sir John Blaker (later 1st Baron of Brighton) donated land. He also paid £1,000 towards the construction in 1896 of a 50-foot (15 m) red-brick and iron clock tower with a pale green exterior. It is topped by a cupola with a dolphin-shaped weather-vane, and bears Blaker's monogram. Patcham's clock tower, built of pale stone in an International/Modernist style, stands on a green amidst 1930s housing and forms an important landmark.

The city also has several war memorials, including the main First World War memorials—Hove War Memorial, by Sir Edwin Lutyens is located on Grand Avenue; Brighton War Memorial is in Old Steine Gardens. Both include later rededications. During the First World War, thousands of Indian casualties were treated in makeshift hospitals in the pavilion and elsewhere in Brighton; those who died of their wounds are honoured by a memorial gate on the south side of the pavilion and by the Chattri in the downs above Patcham, where many Indian casualties were cremated. Also in Old Steine Gardens is an obelisk commemorating casualties from campaigns in Egypt in the late 19th century. On the seafront by Regency Square, a statue of a bugler by Charles Leonard Hartwell commemorates the Second Boer War. All are listed buildings.

Other public monuments include statues of royalty, such as the statue of George IV outside the pavilion and two statues of Queen Victoria—one in gardens off Marlborough Place by Carlo Nicoli, and one on Grand Avenue, Hove, by Thomas Brock. The Peace Statue was created by Newbury Abbot Trent in 1912 as a memorial to King Edward VII; it stands on the seafront at the historic boundary between Brighton and Hove. Old Steine Gardens contains several monuments, including a fountain erected for Queen Victoria's 27th birthday in 1846. The Patcham Pylons, on the A23 road, were erected in 1928 to mark Brighton's historic northern boundary. Along the seafront and in the grounds of the Royal Sussex County Hospital are numerous modern sculptures.

== Heritage and conservation ==
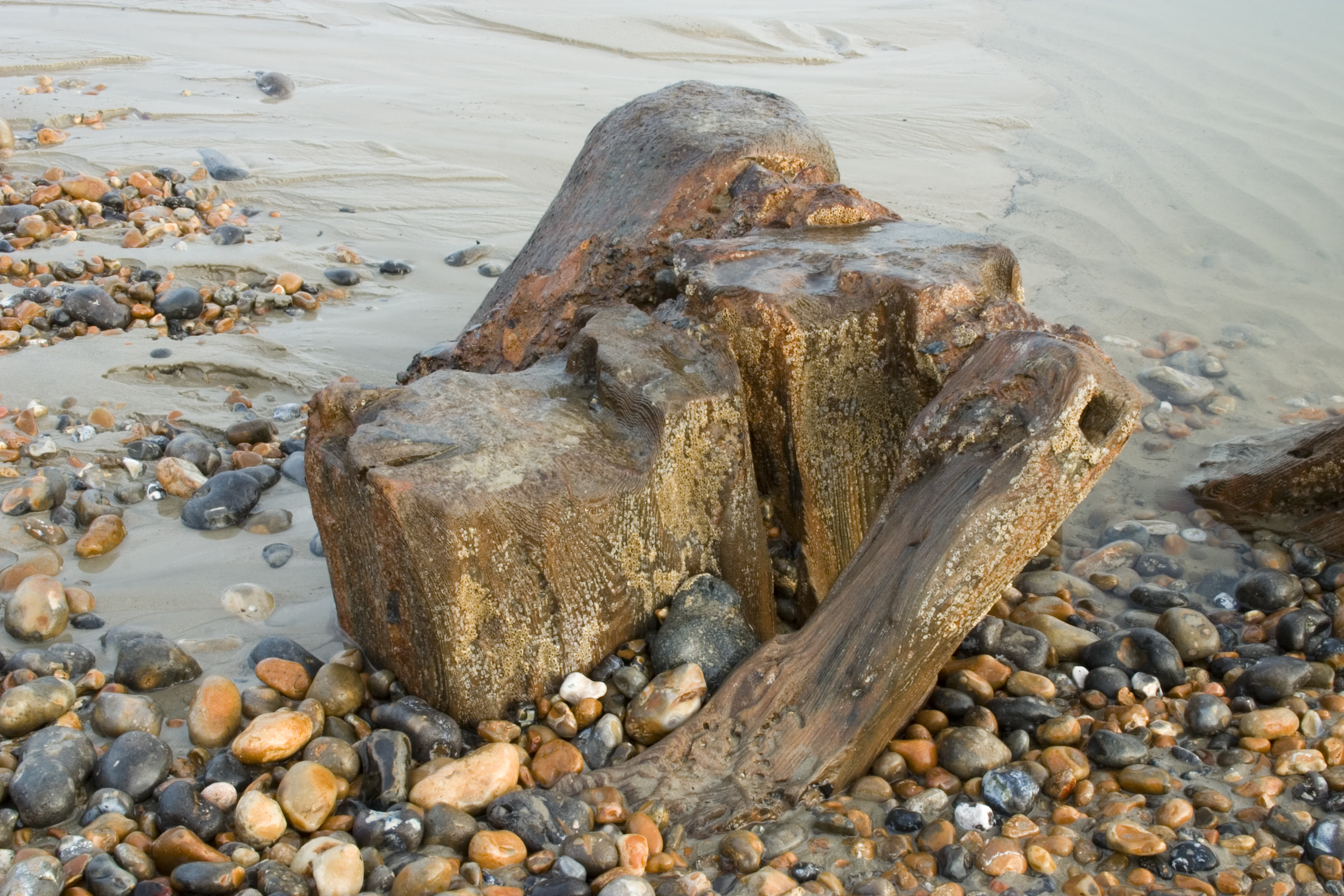
At very low tide, some of the former Chain Pier's foundation piles are exposed. The pier was wrecked in 1896.

Buildings have been lost to fire, damage or demolition since the urban area's earliest days, and the frequent replacement of buildings (even those with architectural merit) by Victorian-era speculators was particularly common along the seafront. After World War II, Brighton's seaside resort function declined, demand for housing rose and it became an important regional commercial centre. Pressure for redevelopment and the prevailing attitudes towards pre-20th-century architecture resulted in widespread demolition; many of the new buildings were architecturally unsuccessful because their scale, build quality and relationship with their surroundings were poor. In other cases, large sites stayed vacant for decades pending redevelopment. The city faces unusually severe geographical constraints—it lies between the English Channel and the South Downs (an Area of Outstanding Natural Beauty), and has continuous urban development to the east and west—and intense pressure for redevelopment continues. Nevertheless, many buildings have also been saved—not least the Royal Pavilion, which was bought by the local authorities when Queen Victoria moved out and which faced another threat in the 1930s.

National conservation groups such as The Victorian Society and The Georgian Group are active in the city, and the Regency Society was founded in 1945 to conserve Brighton's architectural heritage in a direct response to Herbert Carden's proposals for wholesale reconstruction. Residents' groups such as the Regency Square Area Society undertake similar work at a local level. The Victorian Society and The Georgian Group wrote a joint report in 1990 examining postwar developments in central Brighton in the context of the older surroundings. It observed that the growth of Brighton as a commercial centre since World War II had damaged its character: "grossly inappropriate commercial development" was starting to dominate the traditional seaside resort architecture characterised by the Regency terraces and squares, the piers and the Royal Pavilion.

=== Demolished buildings ===
The Royal Suspension Chain Pier (1822–23, by Captain Samuel Brown rn) became Brighton's first "effective focal point" after it became a fashionable seaside resort, but demolition was already under consideration by the time it was destroyed by a storm in 1896. Only some oak foundations remain, and these are only visible at low tides. Brown's 350-yard (320 m) iron structure had Egyptian Revival towers at the landward end, and the landing stage was of Purbeck stone.

Hove's original manor house was pulled down in 1936, despite its last owner offering it to the local council for less than its market value. John Vallance built the Georgian-style L-plan house in the late 18th century. Features included a curved porch on the inside of the "L", a cupola-style bellcote and a Chinese Chippendale staircase inside, and some of its flint and stonework may have come from an ancient chapel nearby. Other historic Hove buildings lost in the 1930s include the Classical-style Well House at the chalybeate spring in St Ann's Well Gardens—the Ionic-columned, colonnade-fronted structure decayed as the spring ran dry, and was demolished in 1935—and the mid 18th-century Wick House. This was owned by several important figures in local history, such as landowner Thomas Scutt, Rev. Edward Everard (associated with Brunswick Town and St Andrew's Church at Waterloo Street) and Sir Isaac Goldsmid, 1st Baronet. Along with the neighbouring Wick Hall, designed and built between 1833 and 1840 by Decimus Burton, it was demolished in 1935 to make way for the Furze Hill mansion flats. Burton's three-storey Wick Hall was Classical in style, with a prominent cornice, a parapet with ornate stone urns, and on the garden-facing elevation a curved bay faced with a series of Ionic columns. Collectively, these four buildings were "Hove's oldest and most important houses".

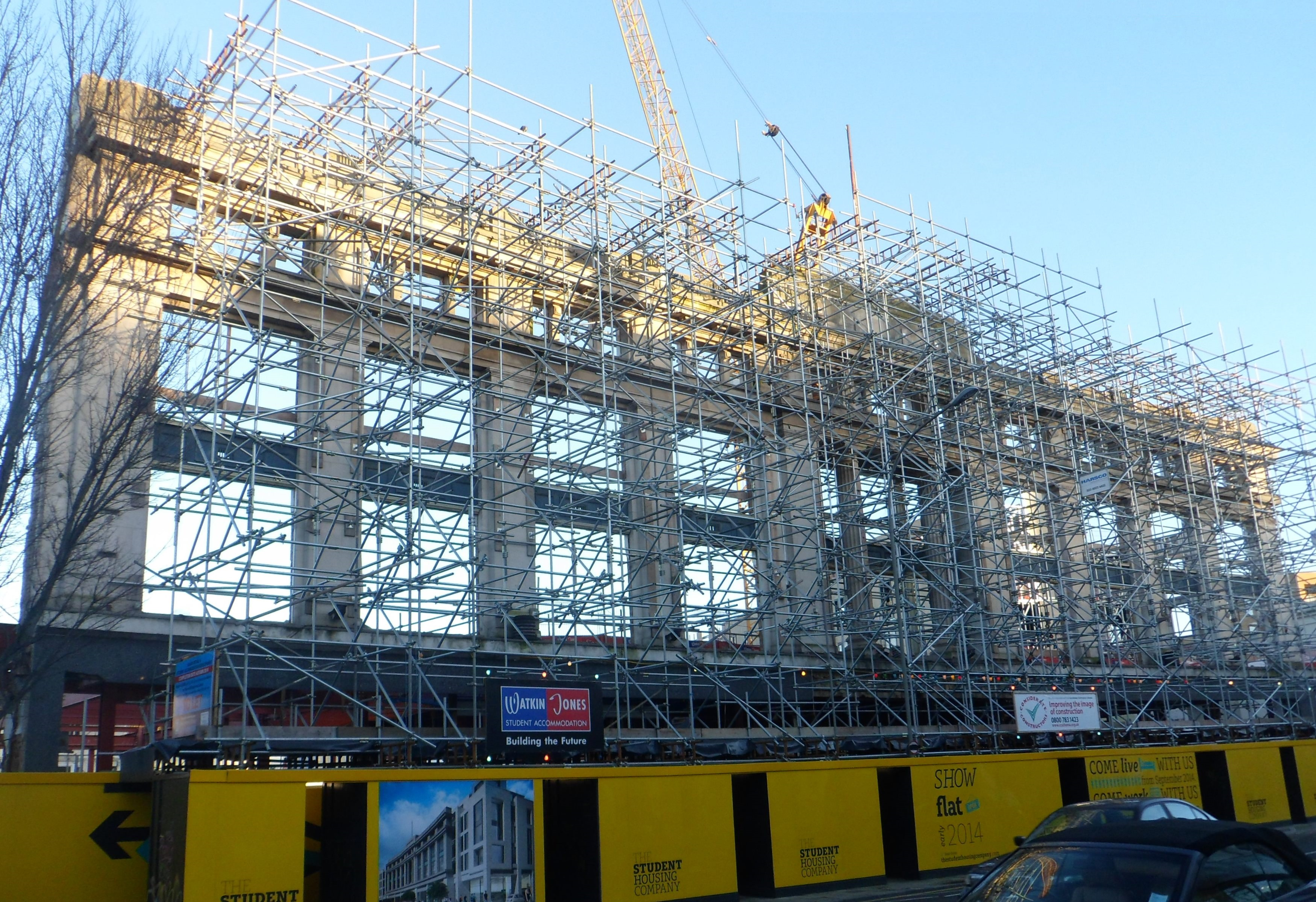
In 2013, the Brighton Co-operative building on London Road (1932) was demolished apart from its façade, behind which will be student housing.

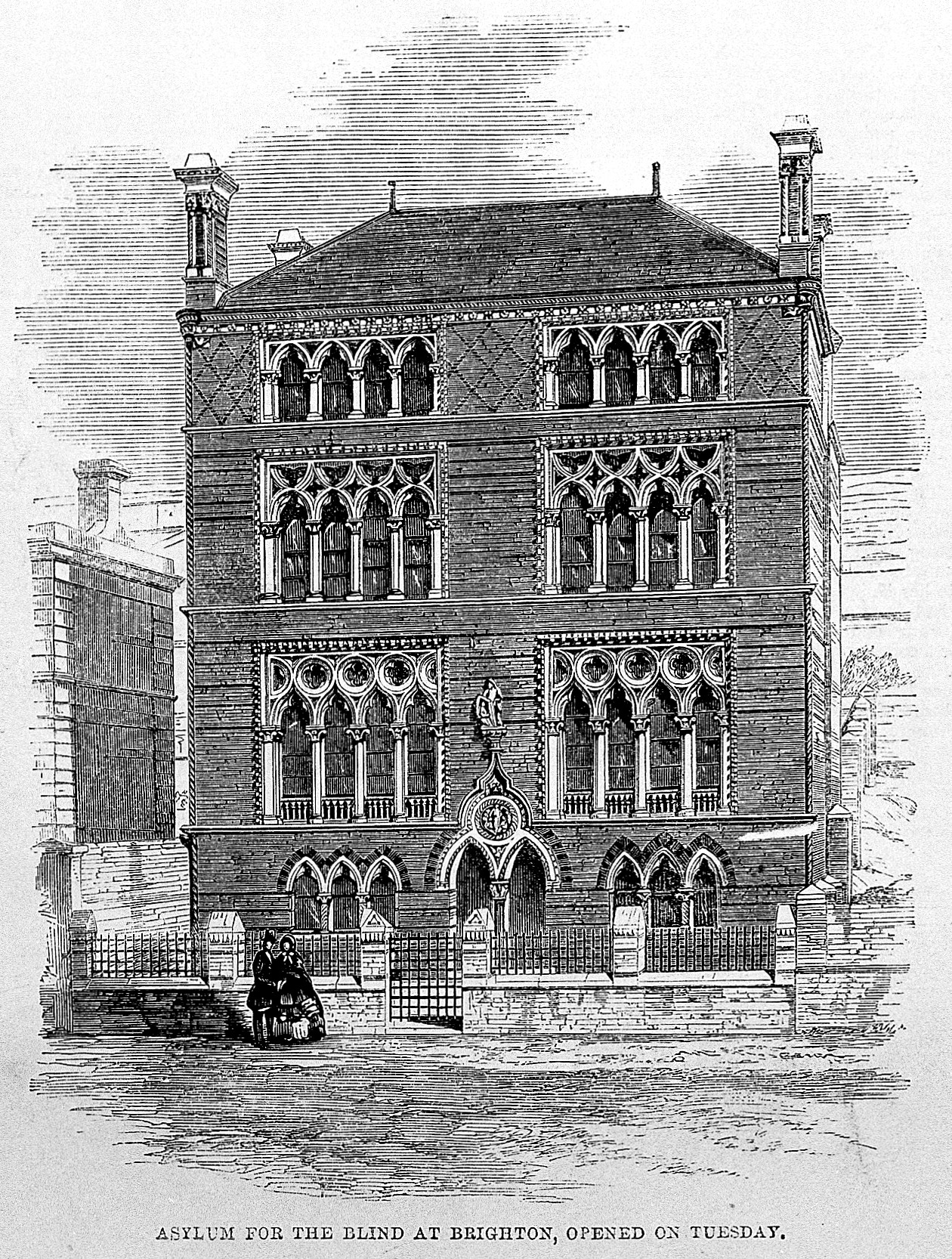
Asylum for the Blind, Brighton.

Postwar demolition and redevelopment has been extensive in places. An especially infamous incident occurred in 1971, when Stroud and Mew's "Regency Gothic" Central National School in North Laine was knocked down hours before its listed status was granted: the letter was apparently delayed by a postal strike. The building dated from 1830 and was founded by Vicar of Brighton Henry Michell Wagner. Another school, the Brighton Asylum for the Blind on Eastern Road (designed by George Somers Clarke, architect of the similarly flamboyant Swan Downer School on Dyke Road) was "tragically demolished" thirteen years earlier. Built in 1860–61, it was a precise and richly decorated interpretation of the Venetian Gothic style. The Bedford Hotel, Thomas Cooper's "distinguished" Classical-style seafront hotel of 1829, was dominated by a series of Ionic columns. Once Brighton's highest-class hotel, its future was undecided and redevelopment was under consideration when it burnt down in 1964. The remains were quickly demolished and replaced by a 17-storey, 168-foot (51 m) Brutalist structure by Richard Seifert. A different approach has been used more recently in some cases: historic and architecturally interesting façades have been retained while the rest of the site has been demolished and redeveloped. Examples of this are the former Lewes Road United Reformed Church, whose façade now hides flats, and the Brighton Co-operative store on London Road. Architects Bethell and Swannell designed the four-storey building, whose wide frontage is dominated by fluted columns of the Doric order. In 2013 all but the façade was demolished in favour of student housing.

Road schemes have long been a source of demolition and redevelopment: as early as 1902, part of the historic Brighton Brewery was removed to remove a notorious bottleneck (known locally as "The Bunion") on Church Road in Hove. Large-scale projects then threatened several parts of central Brighton between the 1960s and 1990s, but all were abandoned. A 1973 report by town planners Hugh Wilson and Lewis Womersley, which recommended large-scale demolition in North Laine in favour of a flyover and car park, was rejected. The idea re-emerged in the late 1980s as the "Breeze into Brighton" Preston Circus Relief Road scheme, one of many ideas for the vacant Brighton Locomotive Works site now occupied by the New England Quarter; this would have replaced several buildings of historic interest on York Place and Cheapside, driven a trunk road through hundreds of houses and commercial buildings and sliced a corner off the listed Bedford Square on the seafront.

=== Listed buildings ===
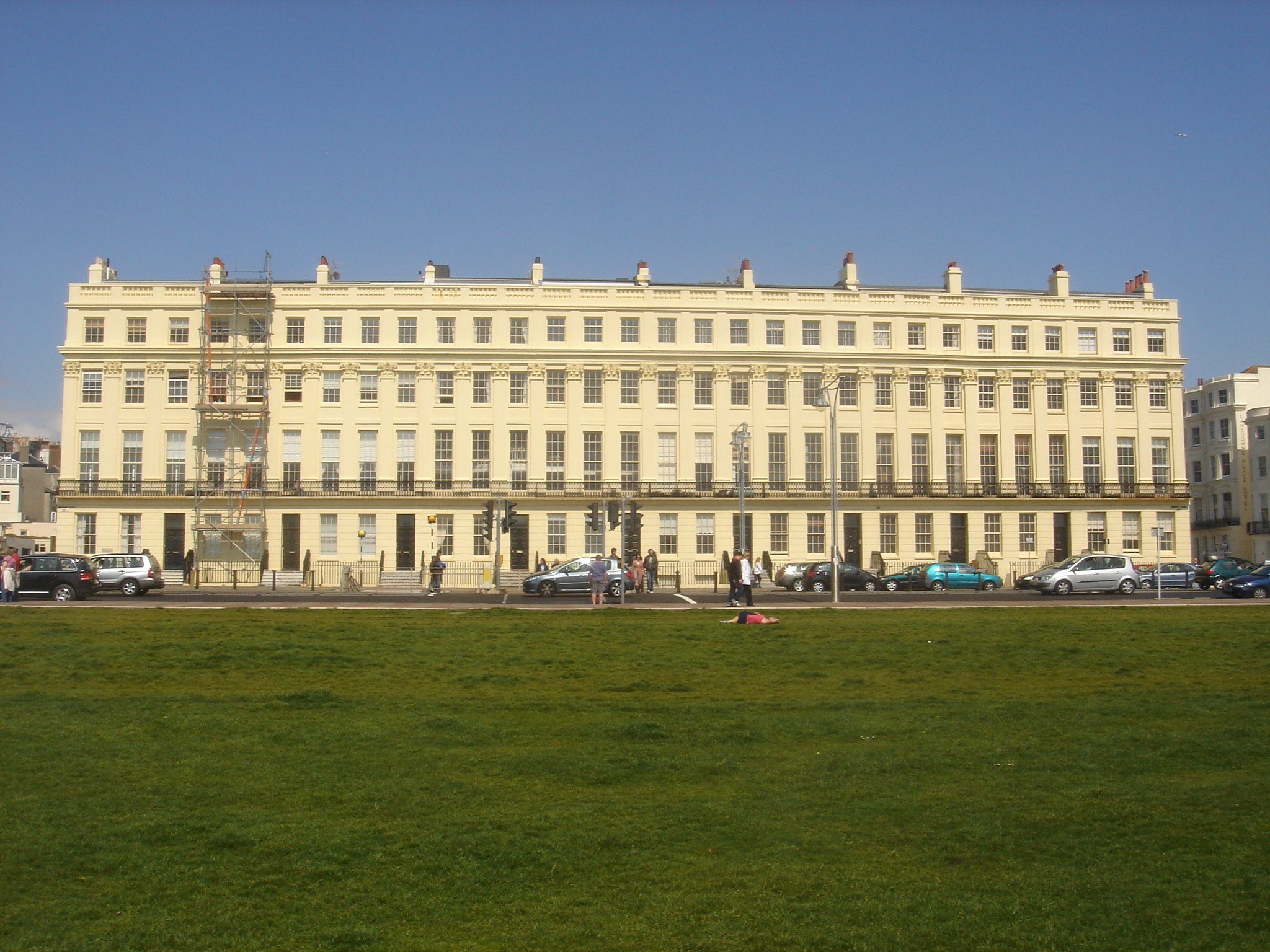
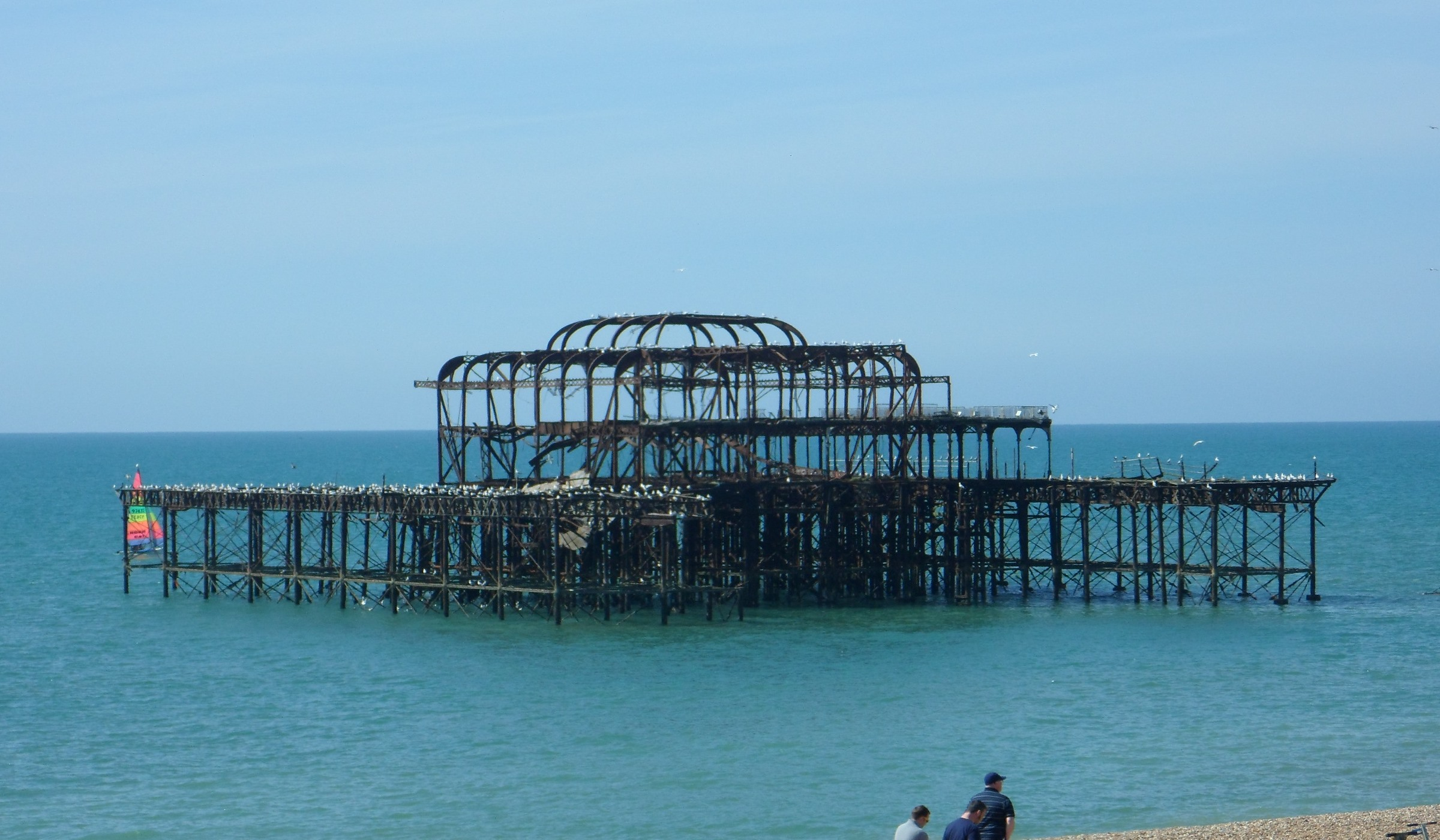
Grade I listed buildings in Brighton and Hove include Brunswick Terrace and the ruined West Pier.
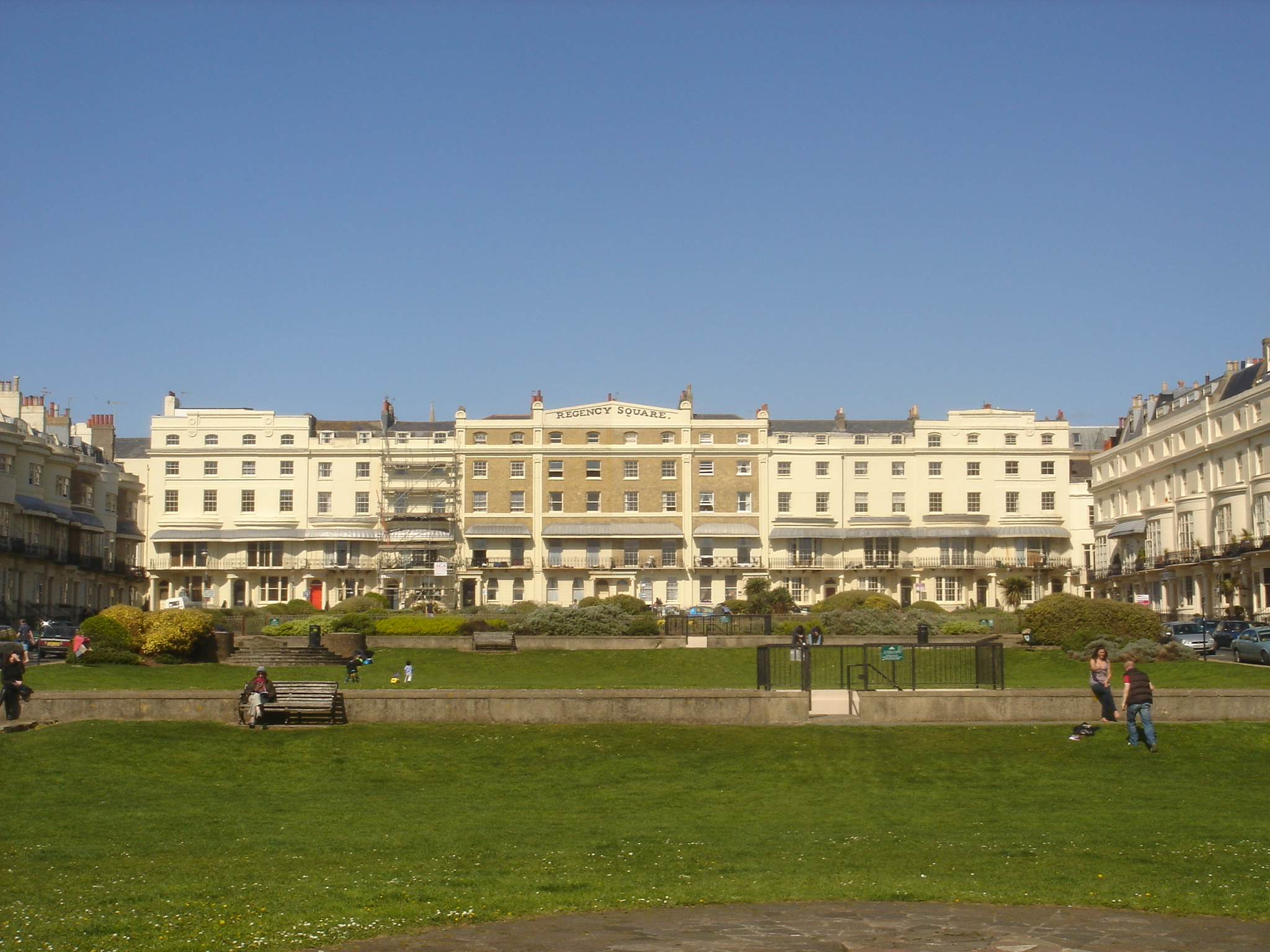
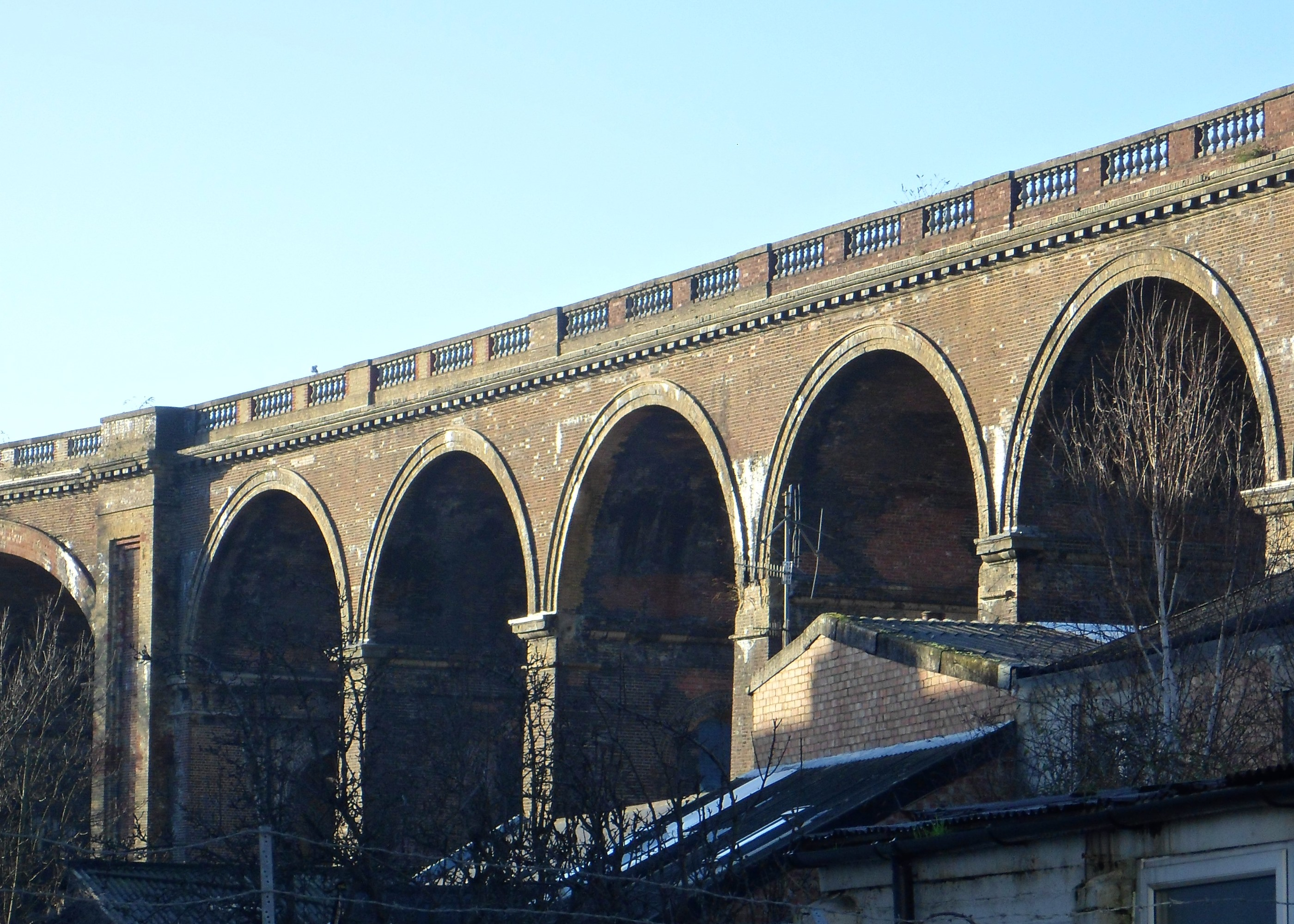
Regency Square and London Road Viaduct are examples of Grade II* listed buildings.

In England, listed buildings are legally protected for their "special architectural or historic interest". As of February 2001, Brighton and Hove had 24 Grade I listed buildings, 70 with a status of Grade II* and 1,124 Grade II listed buildings. Brighton and Hove City Council issues periodic summarised updates of the city's listed building stock; the latest document was published in October 2013.

Grade I, the highest status, indicates that a building is of "exceptional interest" and greater than national importance. Grade II* is used for "particularly important buildings of more than special interest"; and Grade II, the lowest designation, is used for "nationally important buildings of special interest". All three grades offer some protection against changes which would affect the structure's character, from interior restoration to demolition. Proposed alterations require consent from the council, which set out its position in a document published in 1981:

The fact that a building is listed does not mean that it will be preserved intact in all circumstances, but it does mean that demolition will not be allowed unless the case for it has been fully examined. Alterations must preserve the character of the building as far as possible. Listed Building Consent must be obtained from the council for any proposal to demolish or materially alter a listed building. Failure to do so can result in an unlimited fine, 12 months' imprisonment, or both.

— "Effects of Listing" statement in the List of Buildings of Special Architectural or Historical Interest for Brighton, 1981

Buildings listed at Grade I include the Royal Pavilion, Stanmer House, several churches, the wrecked West Pier, Falmer House, and the principal parts of the Kemp Town and Brunswick estates. Falmer House, part of the University of Sussex campus, is a rare example of a 20th-century Grade I listing. Several other 19th-century residential developments have Grade II* status: among them are Royal, Park and Adelaide Crescents, Regency Square and Oriental Place; many more churches also have this grading. Grade II-listed buildings and structures are varied: items of street furniture (such as parish boundary markers and lamp-posts) have been listed, as have dovecots, gazebos and chimneys; hundreds of houses and cottages, either individually or as part of terraces, are included; and churches, schools and other public buildings (such as Brighton Town Hall, Portslade railway station and many pubs) have also been given Grade II status.

Listed buildings have occasionally been lost to fire or demolition, and are not always delisted. The West Pier retains Grade I listed status despite its ruined, inaccessible condition; and permission to demolish a Grade II-listed house at 128 King's Road near Regency Square was granted in 2002 after it was damaged by fire. Holy Trinity Church in Hove, declared redundant in 2010, has been threatened with demolition since 2008. Elsewhere, in July 2010 the council announced they would move a Grade II-listed shelter on the seafront by 3 feet (0.9 m) to reduce the danger to cyclists on an adjacent cycle lane.

Since around 1990, the various councils (and later subsequently the city council) have surveyed the structural condition of all listed buildings and have provided funding "to encourage the preservation of the city's historic building stock", covering repairs to listed and other historic buildings, replacement of missing or damaged architectural or decorative features, and assistance to return at-risk buildings to suitable use. As early as 2003, though, the city council reported that a change in the way grants were structured meant that financial help for specific buildings may decline in favour of spending money on enhancements to wider areas.

=== Conservation areas ===
The city of Brighton and Hove has 34 conservation areas, which are defined by Sections 69 and 70 of the Planning (Listed Buildings and Conservation Areas) Act 1990 as "principally urban areas of special architectural or historic interest, the character or appearance of which it is desirable to preserve or enhance". About 18% of the urban area is covered by this designation. Conservation areas vary in size from the 316.29 acres (128.00 ha) around Stanmer to the 1.43-acre (0.58 ha) Benfield Barn area.

== See also ==
- Grade I listed buildings in Brighton and Hove
- Grade II* listed buildings in Brighton and Hove
- List of former board schools in Brighton and Hove
- List of places of worship in Brighton and Hove
- Pubs in Brighton
- Media related to Architecture of Brighton and Hove at Wikimedia Commons

== Bibliography ==
- Antram, Nicholas; Morrice, Richard (2008). Brighton and Hove. Pevsner Architectural Guides. London: Yale University Press. ISBN 978-0-300-12661-7.
- Antram, Nicholas; Pevsner, Nikolaus (2013). Sussex: East with Brighton and Hove. The Buildings of England. London: Yale University Press. ISBN 978-0-300-18473-0.
- Beevers, David; Marks, Richard; Roles, John (1989). Sussex Churches & Chapels. Brighton: Royal Pavilion, Art Galleries and Museums, Brighton. ISBN 0-948723-11-4.
- Beevers, David; Roles, John (1993). A Pictorial History of Brighton. Derby: The Breedon Books Publishing Company (for Royal Pavilion, Art Galleries and Museums, Brighton). ISBN 1-873626-54-1.
- Berry, Sue (2005). Georgian Brighton. Chichester: Phillimore & Co. ISBN 1-86077-342-7.
- Biddle, Gordon (2003). Britain's Historic Railway Buildings: An Oxford Gazetteer of Structures and Sites. Oxford: Oxford University Press. ISBN 978-0-19-866247-1.
- Body, Geoffrey (1984). Railways of the Southern Region. PSL Field Guides. Cambridge: Patrick Stephens Ltd. ISBN 0-85059-664-5.
- Brighton & Hove City Council (17 December 2009). Architectural Features (PDF). Supplementary Planning Document 09 (Report). Brighton & Hove City Council (City Planning Department). Archived (PDF) from the original on 4 March 2016.
- Brighton Polytechnic. School of Architecture and Interior Design (1987). A Guide to the Buildings of Brighton. Macclesfield: McMillan Martin. ISBN 1-869865-03-0.
- Carder, Timothy (1990). The Encyclopaedia of Brighton. Lewes: East Sussex County Libraries. ISBN 0-86147-315-9.
- Clunn, Harold P. (1953). The Capital-by-the-Sea. Brighton: The Southern Publishing Co Ltd.
- Collis, Rose (2010). The New Encyclopaedia of Brighton. (based on the original by Tim Carder) (1st ed.). Brighton: Brighton & Hove Libraries. ISBN 978-0-9564664-0-2.
- Cooper, B.K. (1991). Rail Centres: Brighton. Shepperton: Ian Allan Ltd. ISBN 0-7110-1155-9.
- Dale, Antony (1967) [1947]. Fashionable Brighton 1820–1860 (2nd ed.). Newcastle-upon-Tyne: Oriel Press Ltd. ISBN 0-85362-028-8.
- Dale, Antony (1989). Brighton Churches. London: Routledge. ISBN 0-415-00863-8.
- Elleray, D. Robert (2004). Sussex Places of Worship. Worthing: Optimus Books. ISBN 0-9533132-7-1.
- Fines, Ken (2002). A History of Brighton & Hove. Chichester: Phillimore & Co. ISBN 1-86077-231-5.
- Hollingdale, Eileen, ed. (Spring 1989). "Brighton Vernacular". Sussex History. 27. Lewes: Federation of Sussex Local History Societies.
- Horlock, Christopher (2010). Bizarre Brighton. Seaford: S.B. Publications. ISBN 978-1-85770-351-1.
- Lloyd, David (1990). Brighton in Crisis. Brighton: The Victorian Society and The Georgian Group.
- Middleton, Judy (1979). A History of Hove. Chichester: Phillimore & Co. ISBN 0-85033-325-3.
- Middleton, Judy (2003). The Encyclopaedia of Hove & Portslade. Brighton: Brighton & Hove Libraries.
- Musgrave, Clifford (1981). Life in Brighton. Rochester: Rochester Press. ISBN 0-571-09285-3.
- Nairn, Ian; Pevsner, Nikolaus (1965). The Buildings of England: Sussex. Harmondsworth: Penguin Books. ISBN 0-14-071028-0.
- Robinson, L.J. (1966). The Lanes of Brighton: a Brief Account of the Origins of the Ancient Town of Brighthelmstone. Brighton: The Southern Publishing Co.
- Robottom, P.G.; Burne, M.J. (May 1981). Brighton: List of Buildings of Special Architectural or Historic Interest. Brighton: Borough of Brighton Planning Department Information Service. ISBN 0-14-071028-0.
- Scott, Eddie (1995). Hove: A Pictorial History. Chichester: Phillimore & Co. ISBN 0-85033-981-2.
- Seddon, Jill; Seddon, Peter; McIntosh, Anthony (2014). Public Sculpture of Sussex. Public Sculpture of Britain. Liverpool: Liverpool University Press. ISBN 9781781381250.
- Stuart, Donald (2005). Old Sussex Inns. Derby: The Breedon Books Publishing Co. ISBN 1-85983-448-5.
- Surtees, John (2002). Eastbourne: A History. Chichester: Phillimore & Co. ISBN 1-86077-226-9.
- s.n. (1998). A selection of notes on the History of Hove and Brighton including a History of Hove street names and early maps of Hove. Brighton: Brighton & Hove Libraries.
- Whiteman, Ken; Whiteman, Joyce (1998). Ancient Churches of Sussex. Seaford: S.B. Publications. ISBN 1-85770-154-2.
