= Thomas Lainson =

British architect

- Born: 1 September 1824 (baptism); Brighton
- Died: 18 May 1898, age 73; Brighton
- Occupation: Architect
- Practice: Lainson & Sons
- Buildings: Brighton and Hove Co-operative Society Repository, Hove; Bristol Road Methodist Church, Brighton; Brooker Hall, Hove; Middle Street Synagogue, Brighton; Palmeira House, Hove; Pelham Institute, Brighton; Reading Town Hall, Reading (extension); Royal Alexandra Hospital for Sick Children, Brighton
- Projects: Adelaide Mansions, Hove; Norfolk Terrace, Brighton; Sillwood Road, Brighton; Vallance Estate, Hove; Wick Estate, Hove

Thomas Lainson, FRIBA (1824 – 18 May 1898) was a British architect. He is best known for his work in the East Sussex coastal towns of Brighton and Hove (now part of the city of Brighton and Hove), where several of his eclectic range of residential, commercial and religious buildings have been awarded listed status by English Heritage. Working alone or (from 1881) in partnership with two sons as Lainson & Sons, he designed buildings in a wide range of styles, from Neo-Byzantine to High Victorian Gothic; his work is described as having a "solid style, typical of the time".

== Background ==
Lainson was born in 1824 in the Brighton area, and baptised on 1 September 1824 in Lambeth. He married and had at least six children. He died at Hove on 18 May 1898, aged 73 years.

== Career ==
=== 1850s–1870s ===
Lainson set up an architecture practice in Brighton in 1860 or 1862, during a period when the fashionable seaside resort's architectural style was evolving from the Regency and Classical forms of the early 19th century towards new forms such as Italianate, Renaissance Revival and (especially in Hove's rapidly developing suburbs) brick-built Olde English/Queen Anne Revival.

His first commission may have been a 13-house terrace on the west side of Norfolk Terrace, on the Brighton/Hove border, which has been dated to the mid-19th century. The road was developed in several stages from the 1850s. Lainson's design was in the Italianate style, popular at the time because of the fashionable influence of Queen Victoria's Osborne House on the Isle of Wight. (Lansdowne Mansions, now a hotel, has been attributed to Lainson, but its construction date of 1854 predates his entering into practice.) In about 1870 he built another terrace of Italianate houses nearby on Sillwood Road, adjoining Charles Busby's Western Cottages of nearly 50 years earlier. The whole street was renamed Sillwood Road when Lainson's 16 houses were finished. Adelaide Mansions, a four-storey seafront development in Hove, followed in 1873.

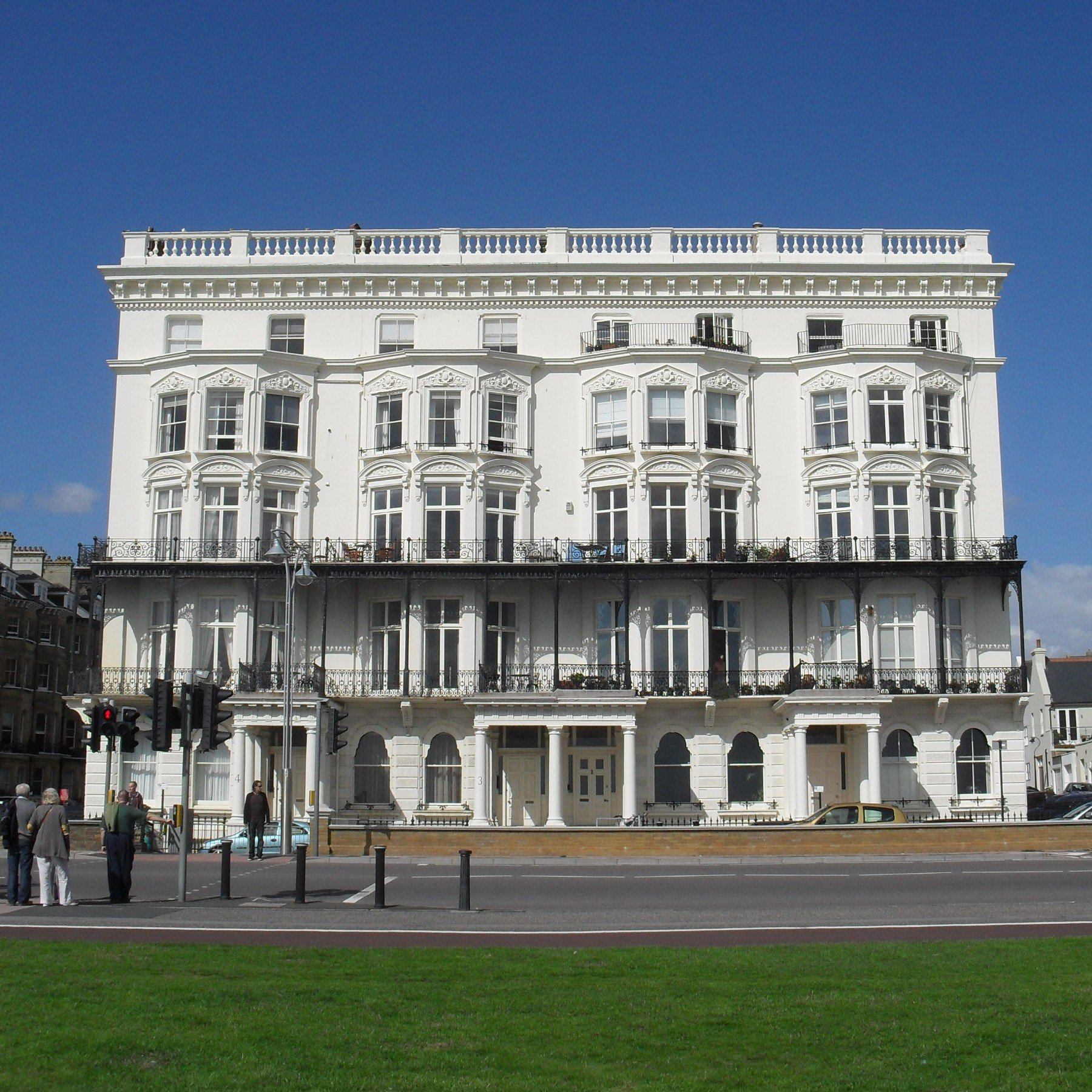
Adelaide Mansions

By the 1870s, a dense working-class residential area had developed to the east of Brighton on the way to the high-class Kemp Town estate; it became known as Kemptown [sic]. Methodist minister J. Martin wanted to extend that denomination's reach into the area, and on 1 March 1872 Lainson submitted plans for a church on the corner of St George's Terrace and Montague Place. His Romanesque Revival design was accepted, and builder John Fielder constructed the church in 1873. Bristol Road Methodist Church survived in religious use until 1989, when it became a recording studio.

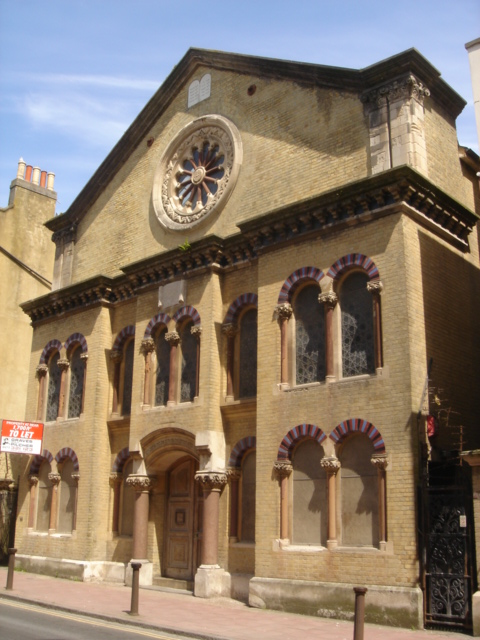
Middle Street Synagogue

In 1874, Lainson received the commission for another religious building: a new synagogue for Brighton's large Jewish community, whose first place of worship had been founded in 1792. A site on Middle Street in The Lanes was found, and the Sassoon family donated money to fund Lainson's elaborate Neo-Byzantine/Italian Romanesque Revival design, which was opened (as Middle Street Synagogue) in 1875. Lainson won the commission in competition; it was unusual for a non-Jew to design synagogues, but no Jewish architects submitted any plans.

Archdeacon John Hannah, Vicar of Brighton from 1870 until 1888, founded an Anglican "slum mission" (a centre for the physical and spiritual welfare of poor people) in the east end of Brighton in 1876. Lainson designed the three-storey building which housed the institute and its activities; it was finished in 1877, and was known as the Pelham Institute by 1879. Also in 1876–77, he designed and built a villa, Brooker Hall (now the Hove Museum and Art Gallery), in Hove for local landowner Major John Vallance. Lainson became a Fellow of the Royal Institute of British Architects in 1877.

=== Lainson & Sons, 1880s–1890s ===
Two of Lainson's sons, Thomas James (1854–1924) and Arthur Henry (1859–1922), joined his practice in 1881. After this, most commissions were undertaken jointly under the name Lainson & Sons. The first of these was the Royal Alexandra Hospital for Sick Children, built on Dyke Road in 1880–81. The institution was founded in 1868 and moved to a former school in Dyke Road in 1871. The Lainsons' new building marked a move towards the Queen Anne style, which they used again in later work in Brighton and Hove— such as The Belgrave Hotel (1882; now branded Umi Hotel Brighton) at the corner of West Street and King's Road on Brighton seafront. A rare commission outside the Brighton area came in the same year: working on his own, Lainson designed a large extension to Reading Town Hall in Berkshire.

Brighton was a pioneer in the early cooperative movement, and in the 1880s the Brighton & Hove Co-operative Supply Association was a major force in local commerce. Lainson & Sons were chosen as the association's architects, and they provided two large buildings in Hove: Palmeira House in 1887, and a lavish repository and warehouse at 75 Holland Road in 1893. The buildings, which both survive, were of significantly different design.

Lainson had worked as a surveyor in the 1850s, when he was involved with the laying out of the Wick Estate in Hove. With his sons, he did the same for the new Vallance Estate, also in Hove, from 1890 until 1895. Lainson & Sons laid out wide streets with large-scale Domestic Revival/Queen Anne-style brick houses. Lainson died in 1898, but his two sons continued in practice, designing buildings such as the Renaissance Revival-style St Aubyn's Mansions (1899) on Hove seafront.

== Memorials ==
In 2006, the Brighton & Hove named one of its buses in honour of Thomas Lainson.

== Works ==
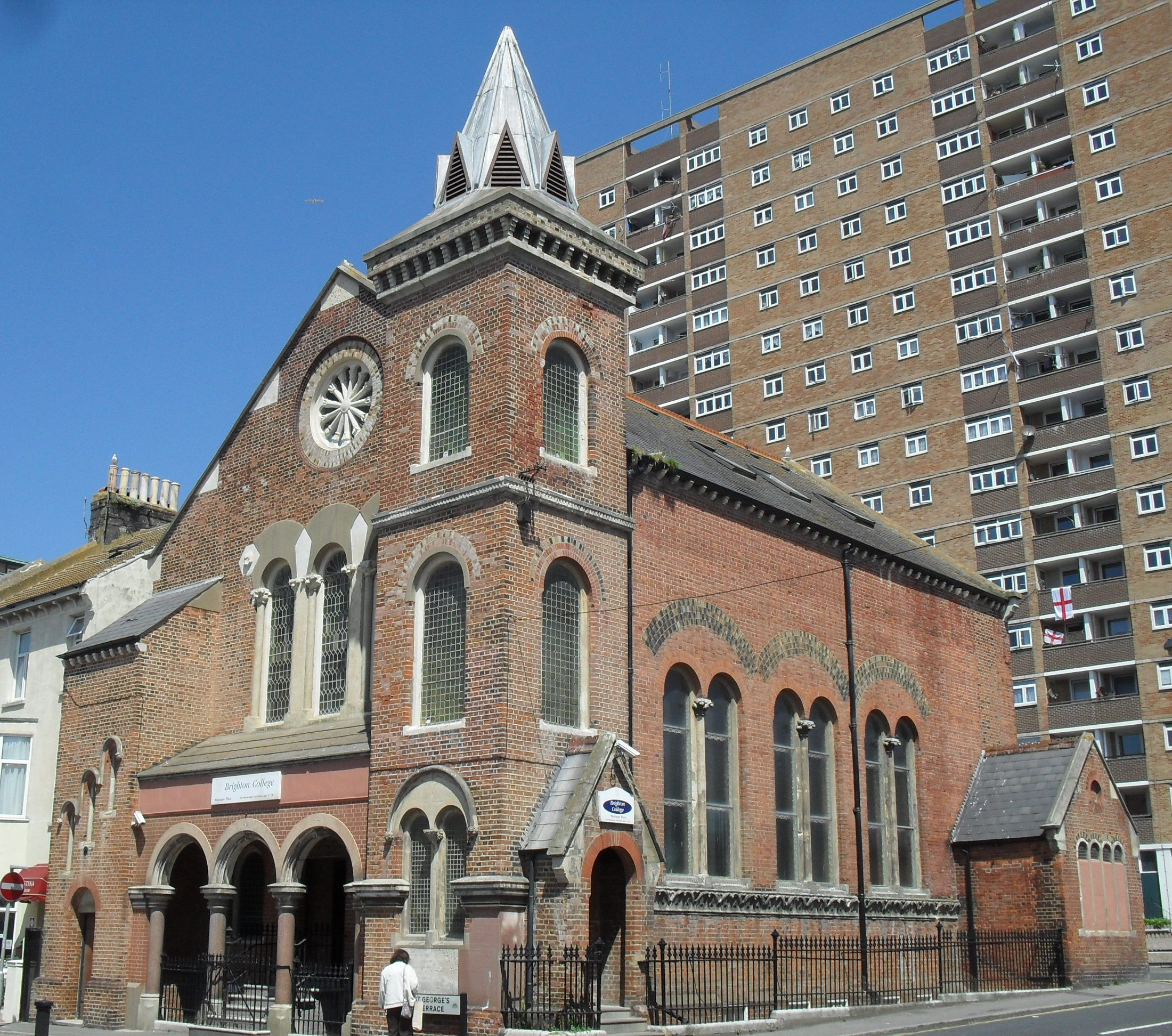
Bristol Road Methodist Church

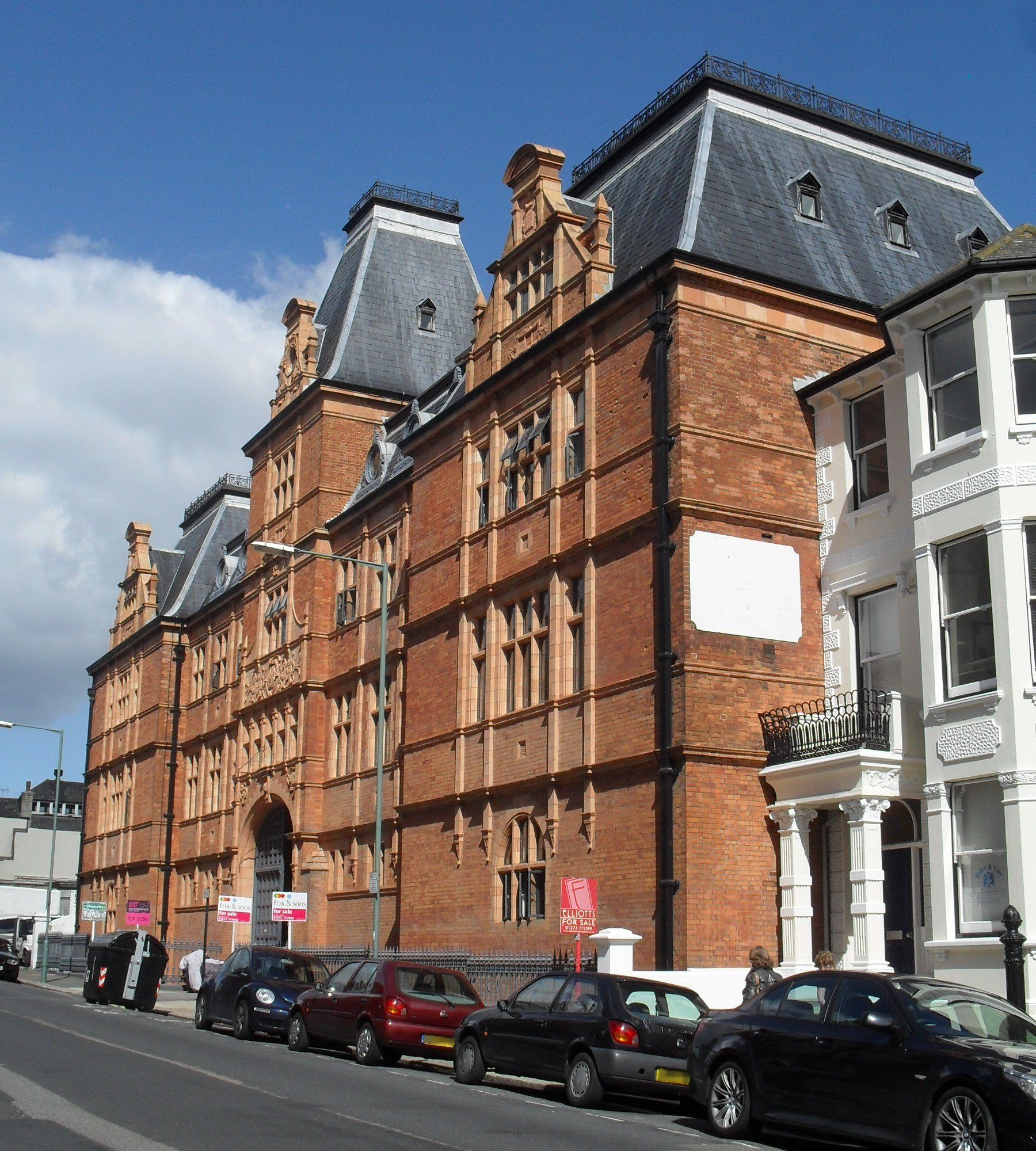
Former Repository of the Brighton & Hove Co-operative Supply Association, Hove

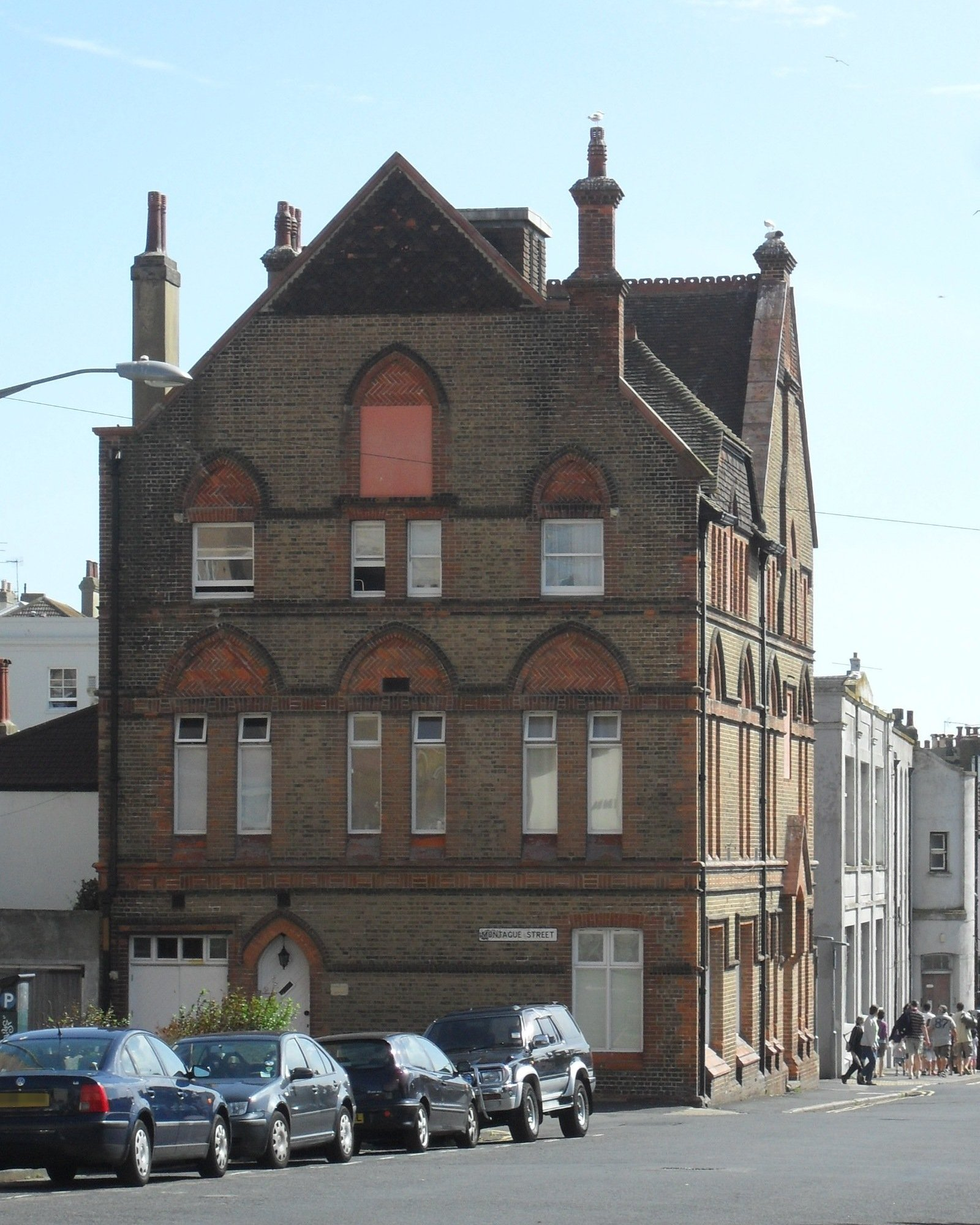
Pelham Institute

- 1–13 Norfolk Terrace, Brighton (1850s–1860s; Grade II-listed): a flat-fronted terrace of 13 houses in three parts. The centre bay, made up of three houses, projects slightly and has recessed doorways set in porches with pilasters and entablatures. The other houses are designed in pairs, and mostly have three windows to each of four storeys. A large arched window with scrollwork spandrels forms a centrepiece.
- 32–47 Sillwood Road, Brighton (c. 1870; Grade II-listed): Lainson built these in an Italianate style with some Regency elements—as such, it looks more like an 1850s development. The three-storey houses have canted bay windows (a classic Victorian feature) rising through two storeys, with ironwork and verandahs. On the top storey, small round-headed windows sit below a prominent cornice with a dentil pattern.
- Bristol Road Methodist Church, Brighton (1872–73; Grade II-listed): a "debased Italian Romanesque" church on a corner site, with multicoloured brickwork, a partly timber-framed roof and a three-stage tower with a short spire. There is a granite-columned portico next to the entrance.
- Adelaide Mansions, Hove (1873; Grade II-listed): a terrace of four-storey, three-bay houses with Classical touches such as Doric-columned porches. There are ground-floor sash windows and iron balconies, and a parapet with a balustrade runs along the top of the building.
- Middle Street Synagogue, Brighton (1874–75; Grade II*-listed): the yellow- and brown-brick Neo-Byzantine/Neo-Romanesque exterior, with a large rose window, multicoloured tiling, arched windows and Classical elements such as a pediment, pilasters and Corinthian columns, conceals a "sumptuous" galleried interior with elaborately carved marble columns, stained glass, stencilwork, brasswork and filigree ironwork. A two-storey round-headed arcade forms a clerestory, and the aisles behind it have arched roofs.
- Brooker Hall, Hove (1876–77): this has housed Hove Museum and Art Gallery since the 1920s, but was built as a private house. Opinion on the Italianate villa, with a short left-oriented tower, varies from "drab" to "the most magnificent of [the] many mansions in New Church Road".
- Pelham Institute, Brighton (1877; Grade II-listed): a High Gothic institutional building in purple and red brick with some terracotta dressings. Its three façades have varied fenestration, and there are irregularly placed gables, dormer windows and stepped chimney-breasts which project slightly from the walls.
- Royal Alexandra Hospital for Sick Children, Brighton (1881): Lainson & Sons' Queen Anne-style building, with Dutch gables, elaborate mouldings, terracotta dressings and a pair of bay windows flanking an oval window, has been added to several times since its construction, and is now disused. The three-storey building is mostly of red brick.
- Belgrave Hotel, Brighton (1882): a building which "makes best use of the corner site" it occupies, and which marks a change from the seafront theme of canted bay windows to the east and west. Broadly in the Classical style and originally with red-brick and terracotta walls (now painted over), the hotel has a turret at the corner, topped with a dome. The balconies are set back into recesses.
- Reading Town Hall (major extension, 1882; Grade II-listed): Lainson added a concert hall, library and museum in a blue- and red-brick and terracotta Gothic Revival style complementary to Alfred Waterhouse's 1875 façade. The interior, with Composite-order pilasters and a semicircular gallery, has Italianate touches.
- Palmeira House, Hove (1887): Lainson & Sons' first building for the Brighton & Hove Co-operative Supply Association was a stuccoed office building in the post-Regency "Victorian Italianate" style of the surrounding Palmeira Square development of 1850–1865.
- Brighton & Hove Co-operative Supply Association Repository, 75 Holland Road, Hove (1893; Grade II-listed): a French Second Empire-style three-storey building with some Queen Anne-style elements, in red brick and terracotta. Steep mansard roofs, ornate gables and arched windows with large mullions and transoms give the nine-bay main façade an elaborate appearance.
- Williamson Cottages for Ladies, 21-35 Portland Road, Hove: Lainson & Sons' Funded by Jane Hannah MacDonald as homes for Elderly Ladies. Jane's bust is mounted with an inscription dedicating the Cottages.

== See also ==
- Buildings and architecture of Brighton and Hove

== Bibliography ==
- Antram, Nicholas; Morrice, Richard (2008). Brighton and Hove. Pevsner Architectural Guides. London: Yale University Press. ISBN 978-0-300-12661-7.
- Brighton Polytechnic. School of Architecture and Interior Design (1987). A Guide to the Buildings of Brighton. Macclesfield: McMillan Martin. ISBN 1-869865-03-0.
- Carder, Timothy (1990). The Encyclopaedia of Brighton. Lewes: East Sussex County Libraries. ISBN 0-86147-315-9.
- Collis, Rose (2010). The New Encyclopaedia of Brighton. (based on the original by Tim Carder) (1st ed.). Brighton: Brighton & Hove Libraries. ISBN 978-0-9564664-0-2.
- Elleray, D. Robert (2004). Sussex Places of Worship. Worthing: Optimus Books. ISBN 0-9533132-7-1.
- Nairn, Ian; Pevsner, Nikolaus (1965). The Buildings of England: Sussex. Harmondsworth: Penguin Books. ISBN 0-14-071028-0.
