= Royal Alexandra Children's Hospital =

- University Hospitals Sussex NHS Foundation Trust
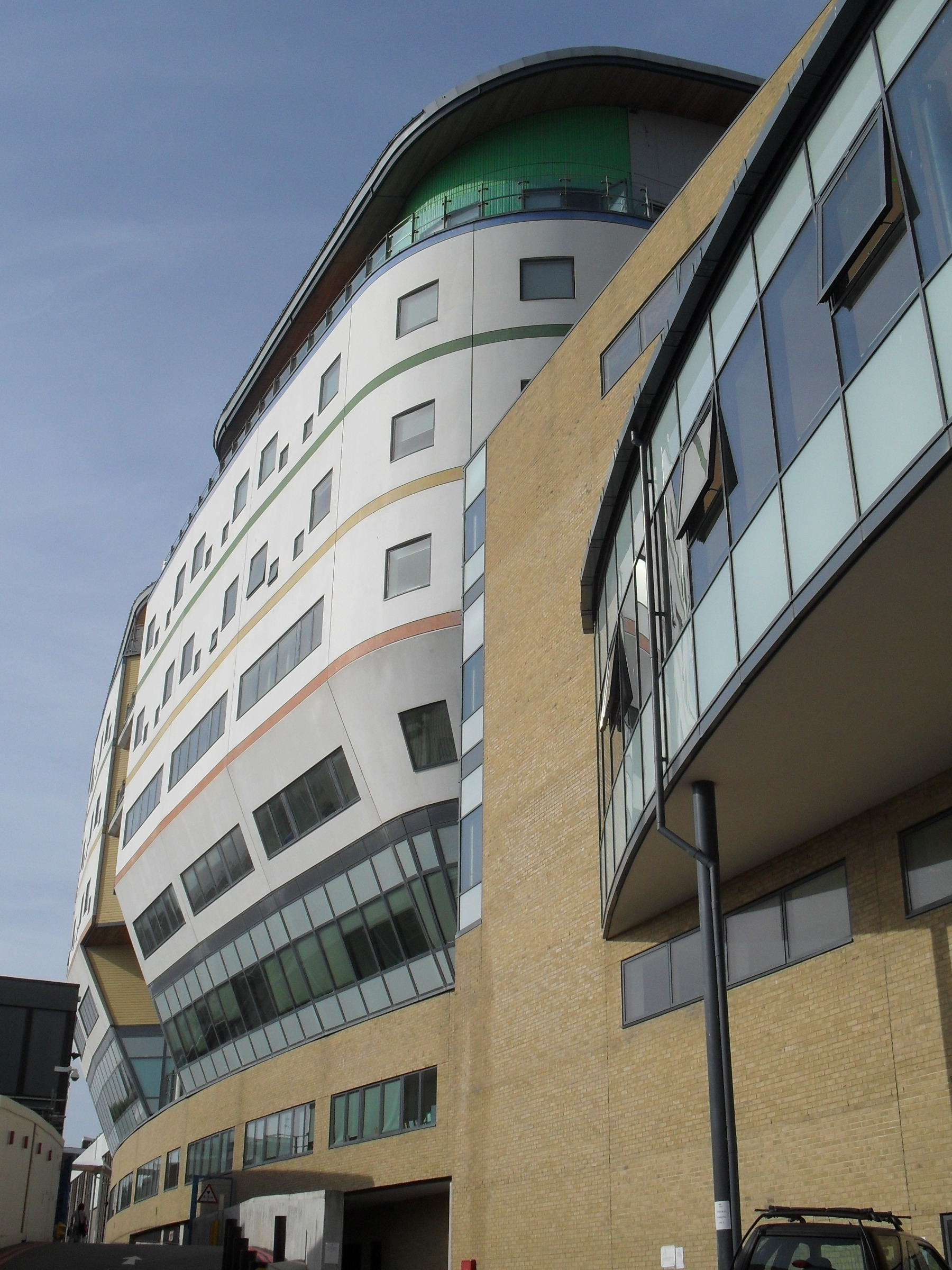
- The new hospital from the southeast

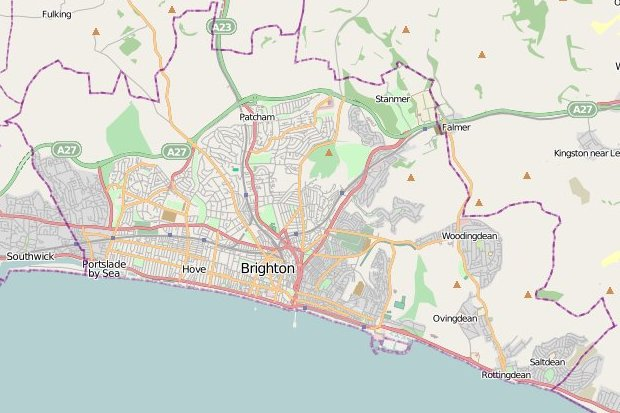
- Shown in Brighton and Hove

Geography
- Location: Eastern Road, Brighton, Brighton and Hove, England, United Kingdom
- Coordinates: 50.819°N 0.117°W

Organisation
- Care system: National Health Service
- Type: Specialist
- Patron: Princess Alexandra, The Honourable Lady Ogilvy

Services
- Emergency department: Yes Accident & Emergency
- Speciality: Children's hospital

History
- Founded: 1868 (at Western Road) 2007 (current building)

Links
- Website: http://www.bsuh.nhs.uk/hospitals/our-hospitals/royal-alexandra-childrens-hospital/
- Lists: Hospitals in England

The Royal Alexandra Children's Hospital is a children's hospital located within the grounds of the Royal Sussex County Hospital in Brighton on the south coast of England. It provides outpatient services, inpatient facilities, intensive care and a 24-hour emergency care service for children referred by GPs and other specialists. It is managed by University Hospitals Sussex NHS Foundation Trust.

The hospital originally stood on Dyke Road in the Montpelier area of Brighton. Local architect Thomas Lainson's red-brick and terracotta building, in the Queen Anne style, was opened by the Prince and Princess of Wales in 1881. It remained in use for more than a century before being replaced by a new building at the main Royal Sussex County Hospital site. The new facility opened in June 2007, and has won architectural awards for its innovative design.

The future of the Dyke Road site has been uncertain since the move to the new premises was first considered in 2001; Lainson's buildings and their later additions were threatened with demolition until 2009, when a developer was refused planning permission to replace the hospital with flats. Brighton & Hove City Council's latest planning briefs state that any redevelopment of the site should incorporate Lainson's original building.

== History ==
=== Western Road and Dyke Road ===
Hospitals dedicated to the treatment of children have existed in England since the mid-19th century: the first opened in Liverpool in 1851. By this time, Brighton was a rapidly growing town with a history of proactively establishing social, educational and medical institutions. In response to a meeting at Brighton Town Hall on 23 June 1868, local doctor R.P.B. Taaffe founded the town's first children's hospital, the Brighton Hospital for Sick Children, at 178 Western Road on 3 August of that year. Two years later, it moved to the former Church Hill School, a disused building on Dyke Road; Bishop of Chichester Richard Durnford conducted the reopening ceremony on 14 July 1871. Although this had 20 beds in the main ward, an eight-bed ward for bone disorders and an isolation ward for infectious diseases, within ten years it was felt necessary to move to another larger building.

Thomas Lainson, who entered practice in the early 1860s, was a prolific and eclectic local architect. By 1880, his works included residential terraces in the Italianate style, places of worship in diverse styles (Romanesque Revival and Neo-Byzantine), a High Gothic working men's club and an Italianate villa. His buildings often incorporated multicoloured brick and dressings of terracotta. In about 1881, he went into partnership with two of his sons, Thomas J. and Arthur, who worked together at Lainson & Sons.

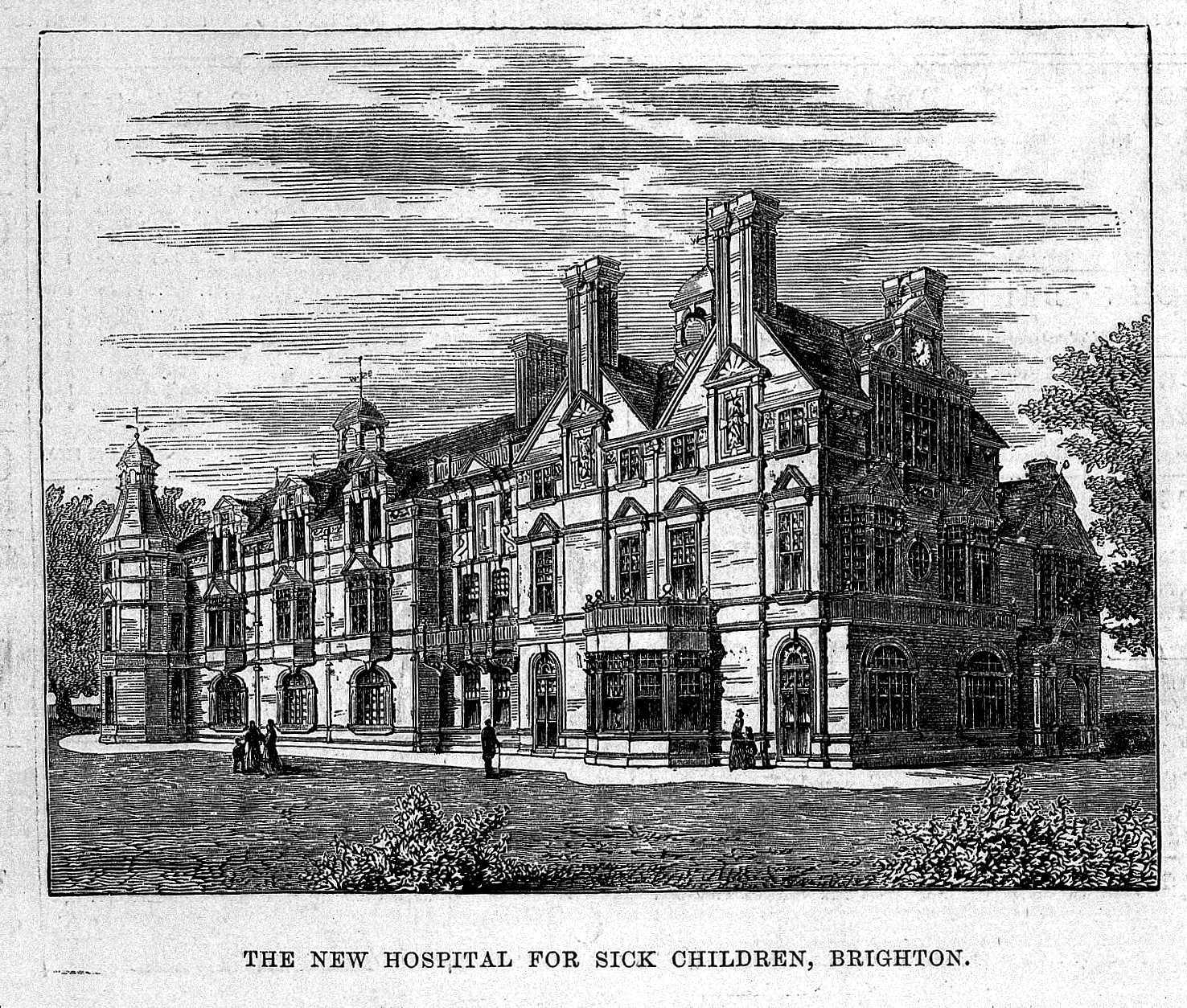
The new Hospital for Sick Children, Brighton in 1881

Lainson won the commission for the new hospital in 1880 by submitting a design for a Queen Anne style building of red brick and terracotta. His sons joined him in designing and building it; This lasted until 1881 and cost £10,500 (£1,104,000 in 2025), and the hospital was formally opened on 21 July 1881. The Prince and Princess of Wales and their daughters Princess Louise, Princess Victoria and Princess Maud were in attendance; Dr Taaffe changed the name of the hospital to the Royal Alexandra Hospital for Sick Children in honour of the Princess of Wales (Alexandra of Denmark). The new building stood at the junction of Dyke Road and Clifton Hill in the Montpelier area of Brighton.

The building was added to many times; none of these changes were by Lainson & Sons. Nurses' quarters were built in 1896; a two-storey extension, with isolation and outpatient facilities, opened in 1904, increasing the capacity to 114 patients; additional wings were added in 1928 and 1945 (the latter opened by Princess Elizabeth, who later became Queen Elizabeth II); and the nurses' quarters became another ward in 1966. In November 1918 the hospital made international news with the appointment of Martha Hunter Hoa Hing, a woman doctor of Chinese heritage from British Guiana, as house surgeon.

=== Plans for a new hospital ===
The first proposal to relocate the hospital came in 2001, when the Secretary of State for Health Alan Milburn allocated £28 million to move its services to the Royal Sussex County Hospital site in Eastern Road in the Kemptown area. The money was part of a £1,100-million hospital-building programme which the Labour government intended to fund through the use of public–private partnerships. The scheme was put on hold for nearly a year until February 2002, when the government confirmed that £25 million was available and permitted the NHS trust responsible for the Royal Alexandra (at the time, the Brighton Health Care NHS Trust) to seek a private finance partner. In August 2002, the trust put the contract for the new hospital's design and construction out to competitive tender. Applications were received from 26 companies; the trust selected a shortlist of four from these in October 2002. Architecture firm Building Design Partnership and the European division of Japanese company Kajima were selected for the design and construction processes respectively.

=== Recent history of the Dyke Road site ===
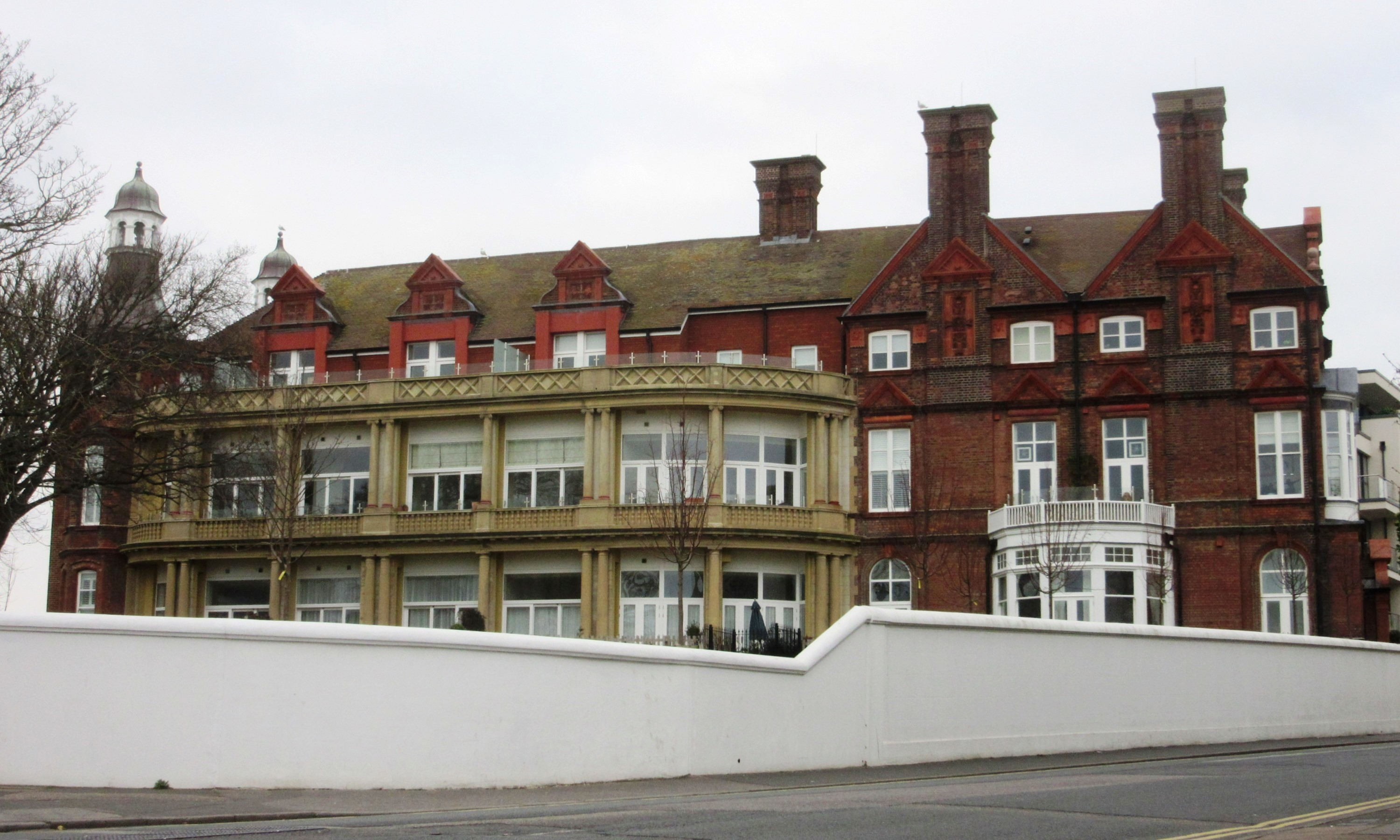
Thomas Lainson's former hospital building on Dyke Road was last used in 2007.

Details of the new building were announced in January 2004—at which point it was also stated that Lainson's buildings on the Dyke Road site would be demolished. Three operating theatres, an intensive care unit, X-ray facilities and 100 beds were planned. Meanwhile, developers expressed interest in the Dyke Road site, hoping to acquire and demolish the hospital and redevelop the prime central location with flats. Housebuilder Taylor Wimpey paid £10 million for the site in December 2006, and planned to build a mixture of houses and flats (including some affordable housing); they submitted a planning application for a 149-unit development incorporating a doctor's surgery, but Brighton & Hove City Council refused planning permission in December 2008 and again (on appeal) in June 2009. The planning officer who made the decision stated that the proposed development was too large in scale for the site, affected nearby open space and appeared "bulky [and] overbearing". The majority of residents wanted the old buildings to be retained, according to a locally produced survey earlier in 2006, and a residents' association applied to English Heritage for the granting of listed status, which would have given protection against demolition and significant alteration. This was not granted, because Lainson's original building had been altered so much that its original architectural character had been lost, but its situation within the Montpelier and Clifton Hill conservation area still gave some protection. (The council's Conservation Area Character Statement of 2005 stated that the hospital was "an important part of Brighton life and a well known local landmark".) In March 2010, the council published a planning statement which required the main building (Lainson's original) to be retained as part of any future redevelopment of the site. Later buildings, such as the former nurses' accommodation, were not covered by this. Taylor Wimpey submitted new plans to retain Lainson's main building but use most of the site for housing. These were approved by Brighton and Hove City Council in February 2011. Work could not start, though, until the council reached agreement with the company over £350,000 of funding towards educational and transport improvements. Several months later, when development had still taken place, the building was falling into decay and was reportedly close to collapse, as squatters and thieves regularly broke in to occupy the building and strip lead from the roof. This prompted the council to serve notice (Note: An "amenity notice" in accordance with Section 215 of the Town and Country Planning Act 1990.) on Taylor Wimpey to tidy the site, make it secure and improve the appearance of the buildings.

=== Royal Sussex County Hospital site ===
Construction of the new hospital started in July 2004 and cost £36 million. The new building opened in June 2007, and the Dyke Road site was officially closed on 22 June 2007. To make way for the new facilities, the Royal Sussex County Hospital's renal unit had to be demolished; it was rebuilt on top of the multi-storey car park. On 31 January 2012, comedian Steve Coogan opened a paediatric accident and emergency unit—Southeast England's first such department dedicated to children. The accident and emergency department at the Royal Sussex County Hospital had previously treated both adults and children.

The new hospital won an award for the "Operational Project with the Best Design" at the Public Private Finance Awards in 2008, and won the 2008 Prime Minister's Better Public Building Award—a government award sponsored by the Office of Government Commerce and the Commission for Architecture and the Built Environment. Judges considered that the design was cleverly executed on a difficult site, and incorporated elements appropriate to its seaside setting.

As of 2022, the Royal Alexandra Hospital is one of 27 children's hospitals in Great Britain.

== Architecture ==
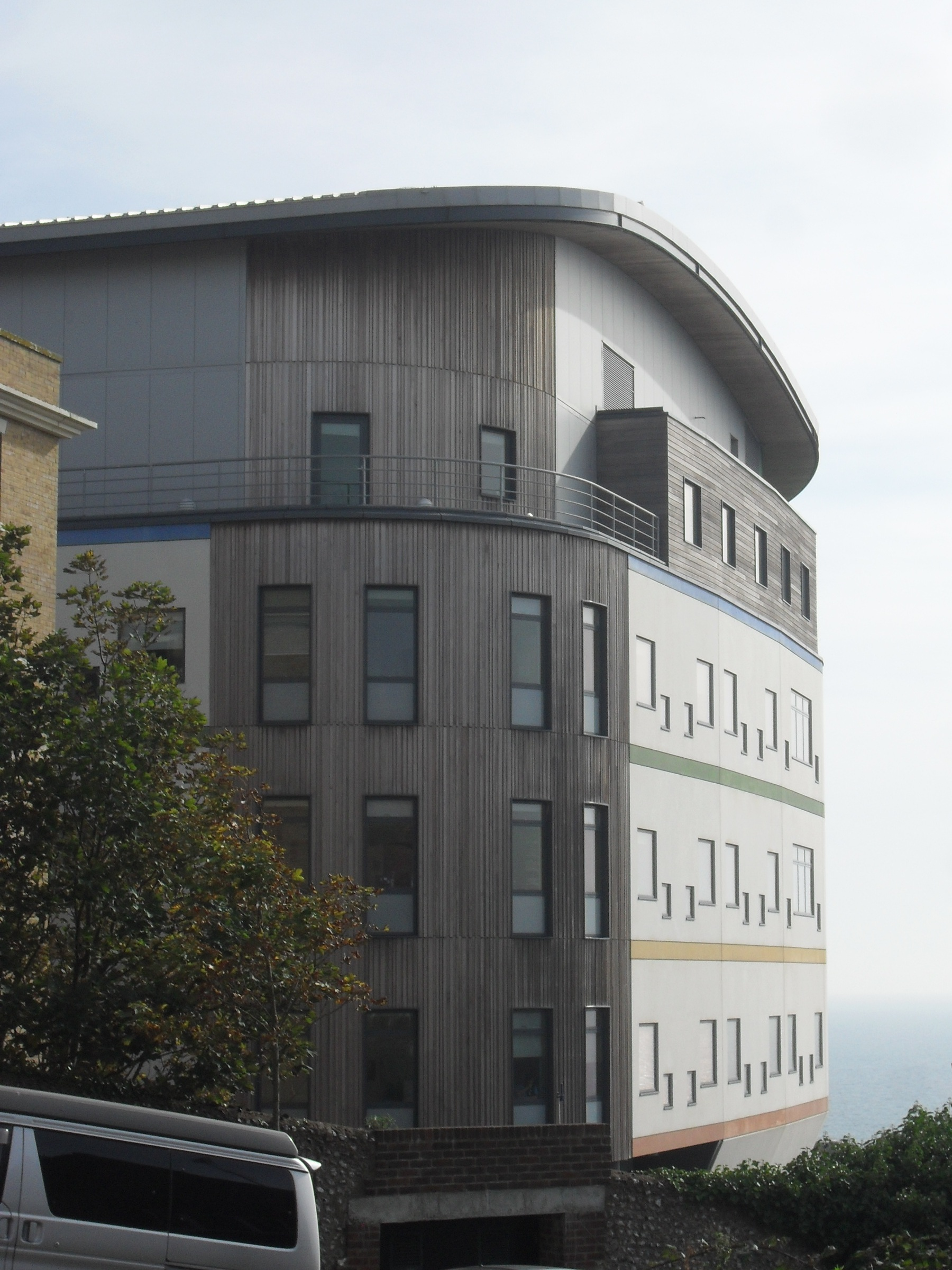
The curved building has sea views and windows at "child height".

Thomas Lainson's building of 1880–81 was in a Shavian interpretation of the Queen Anne style, which he and his sons used again in later buildings in the area (such as the Belgrave Hotel of 1882 and in their work on the Vallance Estate in Hove in the early 1890s). The three-storey building is mostly of red brick with some terracotta dressings. Lainson made extensive use of ornate decorative mouldings on the east-facing main façade, which is not symmetrical and has a Dutch gable. Another decorative feature was a cartouche which commemorated the Royal Family members present at the opening. The south-facing secondary façade has conventional gables, large chimneys and a pair of cupola-topped turrets at one end. Another local firm, Clayton & Black, added a colonnade on this side in 1906. In 1927, the north side was extended in a style which matched Lainson's work: W.H. Overton's design included gables with half-timbering and tile-hanging. The 1904 extension, consisting of isolation facilities and outpatients' accommodation, was in the Vernacular/Domestic style with half-timbered gables with jettying, prominent mullions and transoms to the bay windows, and a small tower.

The new hospital, designed by Building Design Partnership, is in the form of an ark and has a "nautical theme" appropriate to the seafront location. The exterior has curved corners and is clad in white precast concrete, intended to evoke the painted stucco which is closely associated with Brighton's seafront Regency architecture. The fenestration is irregular: many windows are at a low level to improve visibility for children. The building has a naturally lit central atrium.

== Patron ==
Since 1954, the hospital's patron has been Princess Alexandra, The Honourable Lady Ogilvy (styled Princess Alexandra of Kent until 1963).

== See also ==
- Healthcare in Sussex
- List of hospitals in England

== Bibliography ==
- Antram, Nicholas; Morrice, Richard (2008). Brighton and Hove. Pevsner Architectural Guides. London: Yale University Press. ISBN 978-0-300-12661-7.
- Collis, Rose (2010). The New Encyclopaedia of Brighton. (based on the original by Tim Carder) (1st ed.). Brighton: Brighton & Hove Libraries. ISBN 978-0-9564664-0-2.
- Fines, Ken (2002). A History of Brighton & Hove. Chichester: Phillimore & Co. ISBN 1-86077-231-5.
