= Pelham Institute =

Building in Brighton, England

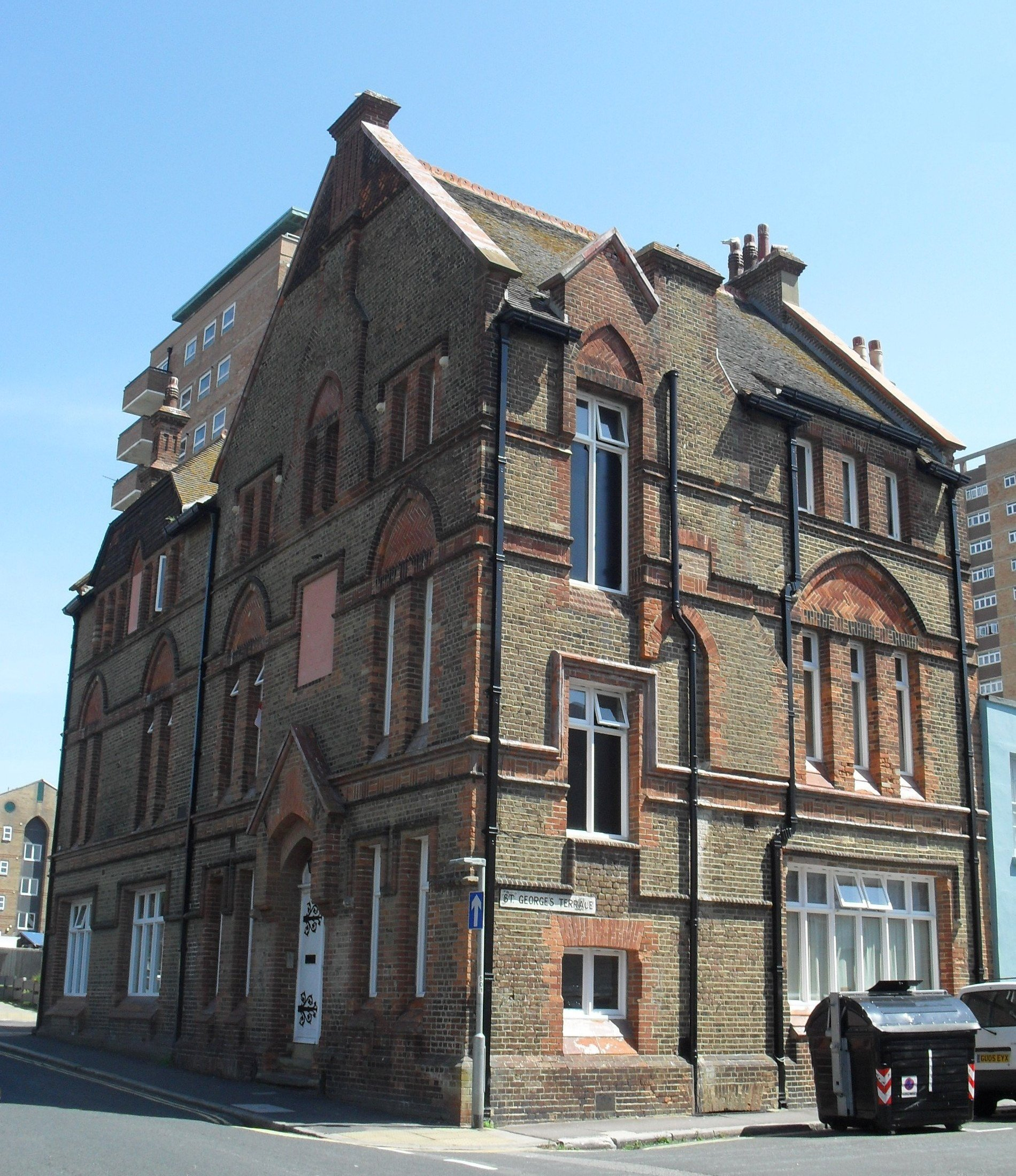
- The building from the southwest

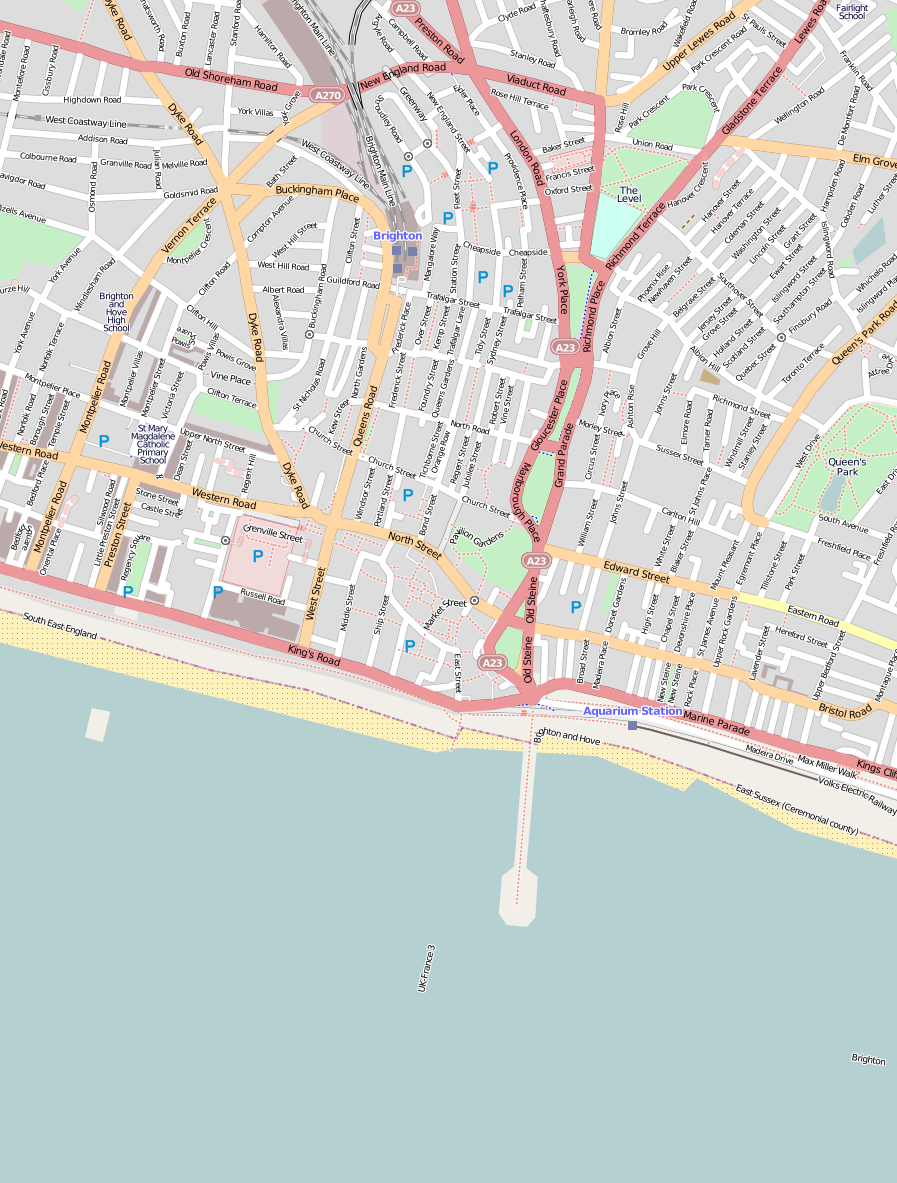
- Location within central Brighton
- 50.8200°N 0.1262°W
- Location: Upper Bedford Street, Kemptown, Brighton and Hove BN2 1NQ, United Kingdom

History
- Founded: 1876
- Built: 1877
- Built for: Archdeacon John Hannah

Site notes
- Architect: Thomas Lainson
- Architectural style: High Victorian Gothic

Listed Building – Grade II
- Official name: Pelham Institute
- Designated: 23 June 1994
- Reference no.: 1381050

The Pelham Institute is a former working men's club and multipurpose social venue in the Kemptown area of Brighton, part of the English coastal city of Brighton and Hove. Built in 1877 by prolific local architect Thomas Lainson on behalf of the Vicar of Brighton, the multicoloured brick and tile High Victorian Gothic building catered for the social, educational and spiritual needs of the large working-class population in the east of Brighton. After its closure it hosted a judo club, but is now in residential use as flats (under the name Montague Court) owned by a housing association. English Heritage has listed the building at Grade II for its architectural and historical importance.

== History ==
Thomas Read Kemp's Kemp Town estate, "arguably the most famous district in Brighton", was developed as a carefully planned estate of about 100 grand houses for the rich people who were increasingly attracted to the fashionable resort. Kemp Town was isolated from the rest of the town, about 2 miles (3.2 km) away, and an old trackway running west–east along the inland side of the East Cliff developed into an important route—Eastern Road.

In the mid-19th century, the area around Eastern Road developed rapidly as a poor, mixed-use area, with institutional buildings, streets of small terraced houses, light industry and a few larger houses. A Nonconformist chapel had also been built in 1829, and the Anglican All Souls Church (closed in 1967 and demolished the following year) served the area from 1834. The area became known as Kemptown [sic].

John Hannah became Vicar of Brighton in 1870, following the death of Reverend Henry Michell Wagner which ended his 46-year incumbency. Hannah was concerned about the social and physical welfare of Kemptown's large working-class population, whose poverty restricted their opportunities for education and recreation. He also felt that the many pubs in the area encouraged people to spend their money on alcohol. He was made archdeacon of Lewes in 1876 and in the same year founded a "slum mission"—similar to a church-sponsored working men's club—on the site of the closed chapel of 1829, near the junction of Upper Bedford Street and Eastern Road. He commissioned local architect Thomas Lainson, already responsible for the Middle Street Synagogue, Bristol Road Methodist Church and several housing developments, to design a building with space for all the required facilities. He carried out the work in 1877, and from 1879 the building bore the name Pelham Institute.

The institute attempted to cater for all needs with its extensive amenities. A large hall for religious services, concerts, lectures and other educational activities took up most of the first floor. A reading-room, eating area, kitchen, bar (which did not serve alcohol), a games room and a smoking room. The second (top) floor had single bedrooms on short-term lets: men were charged 1/– (£5 in 2025) per night or 3/6d (£18 in 2025) for a week. In January 1945, under the name Pelham Mission, the building was issued with a worship licence for "Christians not otherwise designated" under the terms of the Places of Worship Registration Act 1855.

Local slum clearance began in 1926 when the houses around the Pelham Institute were cleared and replaced with lower-density development. Demolition continued through the 1930s and resumed in the 1950s after World War II. By 1959, the working-class population in the Eastern Road area was much lower, and the Pelham Institute closed. Its entry on the worship register was accordingly cancelled in May 1960. Ownership transferred to Brighton Borough Council. In the early 1970s, two local judo clubs—one based elsewhere in Brighton and another from Balcombe, West Sussex—merged under the latter's name (the Mid-Sussex Judo Club) and moved into Lainson's building, which they rented from the council. The club had to move to another building nearby in July 1994. Soon afterwards, the former institute was taken over by the Sanctuary Housing Association, who converted it internally into a block of flats called Montague Court.

The Pelham Institute was listed at Grade II by English Heritage on 23 June 1994. This defines it as a "nationally important" building of "special interest". In February 2001, it was one of 1,124 Grade II-listed buildings and structures, and 1,218 listed buildings of all grades, in the city of Brighton and Hove.

The building is not within any of Brighton and Hove's conservation areas, but the council has considered extending the boundary of the East Cliff Conservation Area to include it.

== Architecture ==
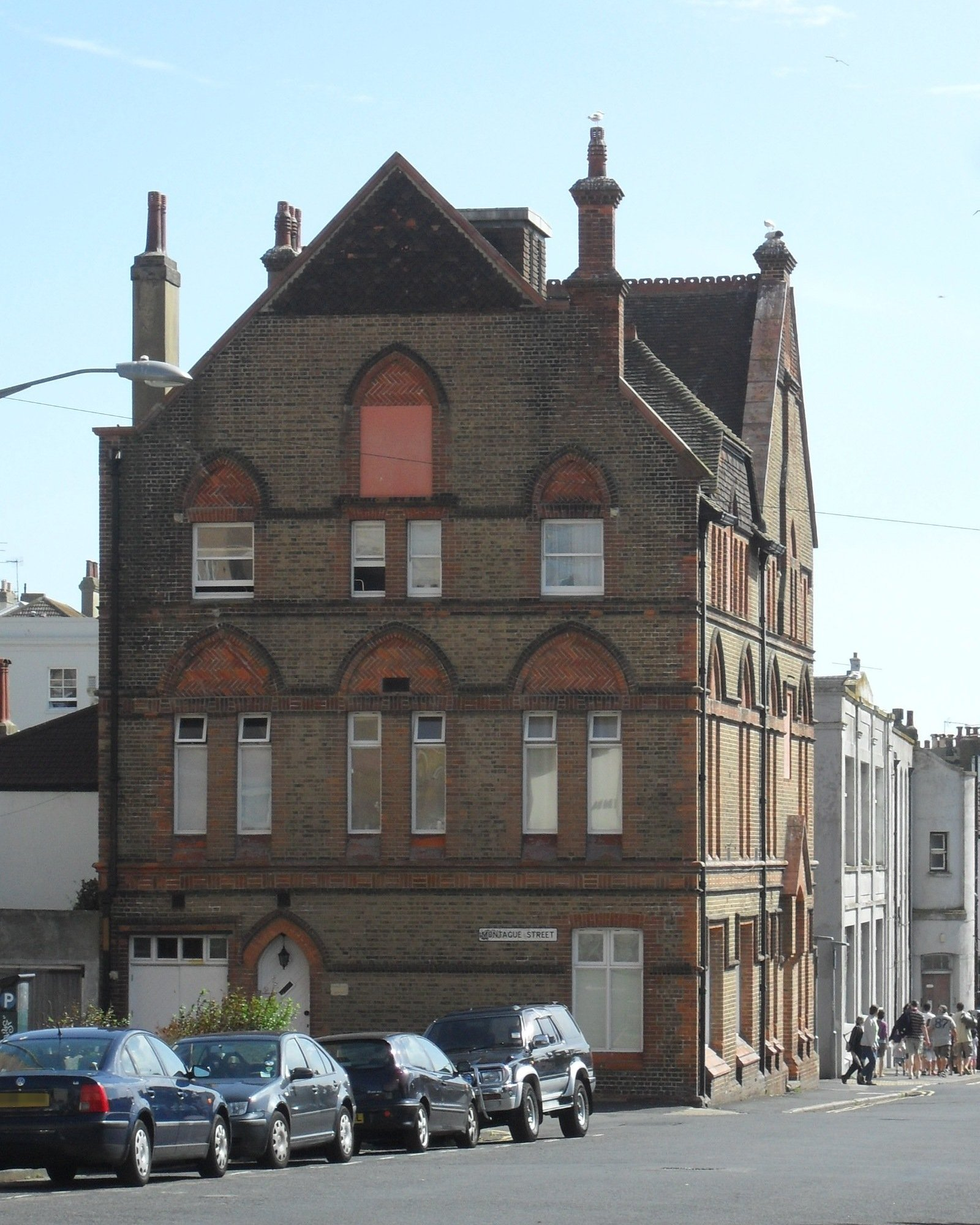
The north (Montague Street) elevation

Thomas Lainson designed and built the Pelham Institute in the High Victorian Gothic style, which was used frequently for slum missions such as this. It is a three-storey building of purple brick laid in the English bond pattern and dressed with terracotta and red bricks. There are also small areas of tile-hanging, and the roof is tiled and has dormer windows. Three faces are visible: one south to St George's Terrace with irregularly placed windows, the main (western) façade on Upper Bedford Street (with a regular four-window range), and a three-window range facing north on to Montague Street. Most windows are flat-headed.

The main entrance is to Upper Bedford Street. A doorway, with a 19th-century two-part wooden door with iron hinges, is recessed into an aedicula with a corbelled pointed arch and a gable above. At second-floor level, a chimney-breast projects slightly and steps up to the gable of the roof, which is topped with a short chimneypot. A window is set into the base of this projection. On the floor below, the four windows are arranged as two narrow pairs below a semicircular tympanum of red brick. The northwestern corner forms a gable-topped bay, again with a stepped chimney-stack. A thin string course runs around the building above the windows, forming a continuous hood mould.

The Montague Street (northern) elevation has single or paired windows under segmental arches; a large stone plaque sits in a recess above the centre windows. At ground-floor level there is another pale stone plaque, a broad segment-arched window, an original wooden entrance door and another wooden door leading to a storage bay.

The south façade, on St George's Terrace, has a segment-arched window in a red-brick surround at the southwest corner and a much wider and taller flat-arched window alongside. The string course diverts to go round a taller flat-arched window in the southwest corner at first-floor level. Diagonally above this are three narrow windows below a pointed arch with a red-brick tympanum. A projecting chimney-breast starts immediately to the left and rises beyond the eaves, terminating in a squat chimney-pot. Three small windows and a tall, narrow one light the second floor. The façade is very irregular and lacks symmetry.

== See also ==
- Grade II listed buildings in Brighton and Hove: P–R
- Media related to Pelham Institute, Brighton at Wikimedia Commons
