= Bristol Road Methodist Church =

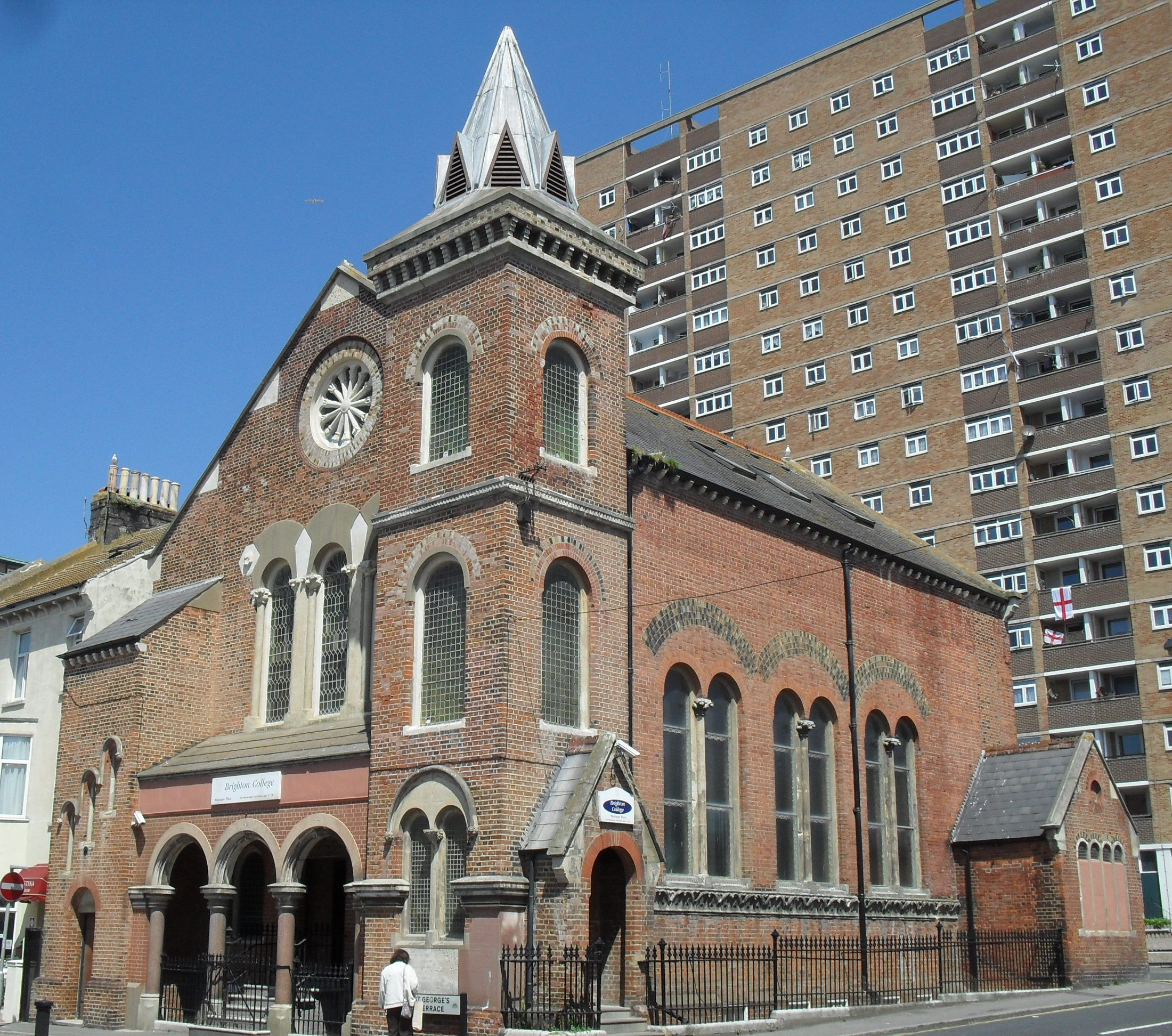
- The church from the southeast

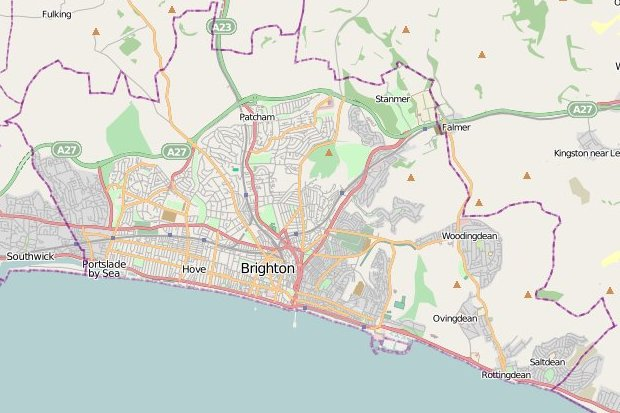
- Location of Bristol Road within Brighton and Hove
- 50.8196°N 0.1245°W
- Location: Bristol Road/Montague Place, Brighton, BN2 1JE, England

History
- Founded: 1872
- Built: 1873
- Built for: Reverend J. Martin

Site notes
- Architect: Thomas Lainson
- Architectural style: Romanesque Revival

Listed Building – Grade II
- Official name: Methodist Church and attached railings
- Designated: 26 August 1999
- Reference no.: 1380359

Bristol Road Methodist Church is a former Methodist place of worship in the Kemptown area of Brighton, part of the English city of Brighton and Hove. Built in 1873 to an Italian Romanesque Revival design, it served this part of eastern Brighton for more than a century until its closure in 1989, after which it became a recording studio. It is owned by Brighton College, a private school based nearby. The building has been listed at Grade II in view of its architectural importance.

== History ==
Brighton's first Methodist church opened in 1808 in Dorset Gardens off St James's Street, a recently developed road east of the Old Steine and the Royal Pavilion. By the 1870s, housing had spread much further east, and the area between Thomas Read Kemp's high-class Kemp Town estate and the earlier development around St James's Street had been filled in with high-density housing. The area became known as Kemptown [sic]. In 1872, Reverend J. Martin, a Methodist minister, proposed the construction of a new church to serve this area. Architect Thomas Lainson, who also designed several buildings (including a Congregational church) in Hove and the Middle Street Synagogue in Brighton, was commissioned to draw up a design. He submitted this on 1 March 1872. A builder named John Fielder was responsible for construction, which continued through 1873. A stone tablet (now partly illegible) at the base of the tower, dated 7 October 1873, names Lainson, Fielder and Reverend Martin, and bears the inscription hitherto hath the Lord helped us.

The church was part of the Wesleyan Methodist tradition, and during the early 20th century became part of a circuit of six local Wesleyan churches; the others were the nearby Dorset Gardens Methodist Church (also in Kemptown), Hove Methodist Church, and others in Hurstpierpoint, Portslade and Southwick.

A closure proposal was announced in 1987. In 1989, the congregation moved out and began to share St Mary the Virgin, a nearby Anglican church. After this, the building was sold and converted into a recording studio. It is now owned by Brighton College.

The former church was listed at Grade II on 26 August 1999. It is one of 1,124 Grade II-listed buildings and structures, and 1,218 listed buildings of all grades, in the city of Brighton and Hove.

== Architecture ==
Thomas Lainson adopted the Italian Romanesque Revival style for his design. The building is of brown and red brick, laid in the English bond pattern, with dressings of stone and pale brick. There is a tower at the southeast corner, rising in three stages and capped by a short spire and a lead roof. Most of the main roof area is laid with slate, but there is one timber-framed section as well. The south face has a stair turret at the southwest corner and the tower at the opposite corner; and between these is the entrance porch, a portico with three arches separated by columns of granite topped with abaci of stone. Three round-arched windows, with stone surrounds and an architrave, are above this; and the façade is completed by a rose window below the gabled roof. There is another entrance in a small porch on the east face of the tower. The internal layout consisted of a three-bay nave leading into a sanctuary, and a single-storey vestry with four arched stone-dressed windows on the northeast side.

== See also ==
- Grade II listed buildings in Brighton and Hove: A–B
- List of places of worship in Brighton and Hove

== Bibliography ==
- Carder, Timothy (1990). The Encyclopaedia of Brighton. Lewes: East Sussex County Libraries. ISBN 0-86147-315-9.
- Elleray, D. Robert (2004). Sussex Places of Worship. Worthing: Optimus Books. ISBN 0-9533132-7-1.
- Middleton, Judy (2002). The Encyclopaedia of Hove & Portslade. Brighton: Brighton & Hove Libraries.
