= Frank Thewlis =

British Methodist minister

- Born: 13 September 1917; Huddersfield, Yorkshire, England
- Died: 31 August 1990 (aged 72)
- Education: Wesley College, Headingley
- Occupation: Protestant Christian minister
- Spouse: Edna Jukes (m. 1943)
- Church: Methodist Church of Great Britain
- Ordained: 1945
- Writings: Think Again (1978)
- Congregations served: Chaplain, British Army, Second World War; St George's Central Hall, Stepney; Great Barr, Birmingham; Dorset Gardens Methodist Church; Brighton Dome; Victoria Hall, Sheffield

Frank Thewlis (13 September 1917 – 31 August 1990) was a British Methodist minister beginning in 1941 and an international conference speaker in the 1950s–1980s. He was born in Huddersfield, Yorkshire. As superintendent of the Brighton Dome Mission Circuit in Brighton between 1967 and 1975, Thewlis preached weekly at the large Brighton Dome Concert Hall in East Sussex, the largest Methodist congregation at the time in the United Kingdom. He was also a frequent guest on "Pause for thought", a religious segment heard on the long-running BBC Radio 2 programme, The Radio 2 Breakfast Show. During a career in the ministry spanning five decades, he preached at the three largest Methodist congregations in the United Kingdom.

== Early years ==
Thewlis was born on 13 September 1917, in Huddersfield, Yorkshire. As a boy growing up in Southport, Lancashire, he first aspired to a career as an architect, before finding himself called to the ministry. A fan of association football, he was assistant secretary with the Southport Football Club before entering college. In 1938, he entered Wesley College, then in Headingley, completing his studies there in 1941.

== Ministry ==
Whilst a probationer minister before ordination, Thewlis served as an army chaplain during the Second World War; he received a commission in the Royal Army Chaplains' Department in May 1943. Following the end of the war and his ordination by the Methodist Church of Great Britain in 1945, he became minister of St George's Central Hall at Stepney, in the East End of London, and later at Great Barr in Birmingham, where crowds were so large that two services on Sunday nights became necessary to accommodate the throngs. In 1955, Thewlis was named superintendent in Huddersfield and then served at the Methodist church in Bradford, which had the largest Methodist congregation in the north of England at the time.

In 1967, Thewlis became minister of Dorset Gardens Methodist Church in Brighton and superintendent of the Brighton Dome Mission Circuit (which merged in later years with the Brighton and Hove Circuit) on the East Sussex coast. In addition to conducting Sunday morning services at Dorset Gardens Methodist Church, he preached weekly on Sunday evenings at the large Brighton Dome Concert Hall to audiences of one thousand to as many as two thousand persons. This was the largest Methodist congregation in the British Isles at the time. He continued there until August 1975.

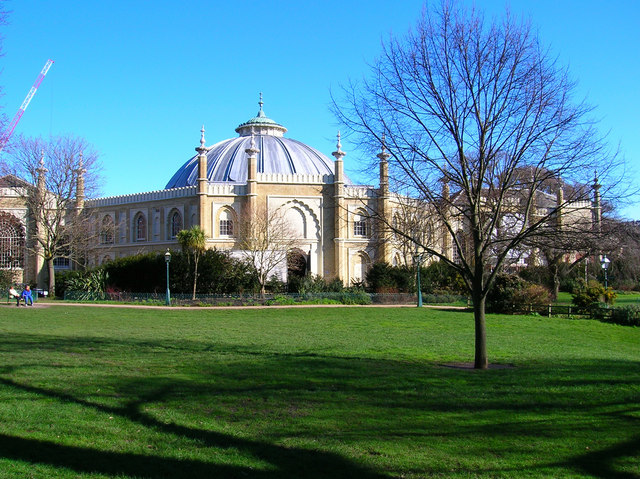
The Brighton Dome, where Thewlis preached 1967–1975

In 1968, Thewlis participated with other clergy in the 72nd anniversary of the Whitechapel Mission and the start of a fundraising campaign for the construction of its new facilities. His final pastorate before retirement was at Victoria Hall, Sheffield. Aside from his public speaking, Thewlis was known for counselling and encouraging young ministers and being a friend to their families. "He had a tremendous gift for making friends and caring for others", recalled his official obituary published in the Minutes of the Methodist Conference, 1991.

Thewlis wrote the book Think Again, a 1978 compendium of his frequent talks on "Pause for thought", a religious segment heard by millions on the long-running BBC Radio 2 programme, The Radio 2 Breakfast Show. In response to criticism of Freemasonry as unchristian, Thewlis urged his fellow Masons, "Try not to feel hurt, don't give way to those who seem determined to turn Methodism into an exclusive minor sect". As a prominent religious leader in Great Britain, he was often asked to comment on current events and issues. In 1979, he urged closer liaison between social workers and lawyers in child-care cases in Sheffield. In the midst of the rioting in English cities in 1981, Thewlis feared that the unrest in Huddersfield might become a race war, saying, "I would make an appeal from the pulpit — but what's the use? It would fall on wrong ears". Thewlis was appointed by Queen Elizabeth II a member of the Order of St John of Jerusalem (MStJ) in 1977.

== International preaching ==
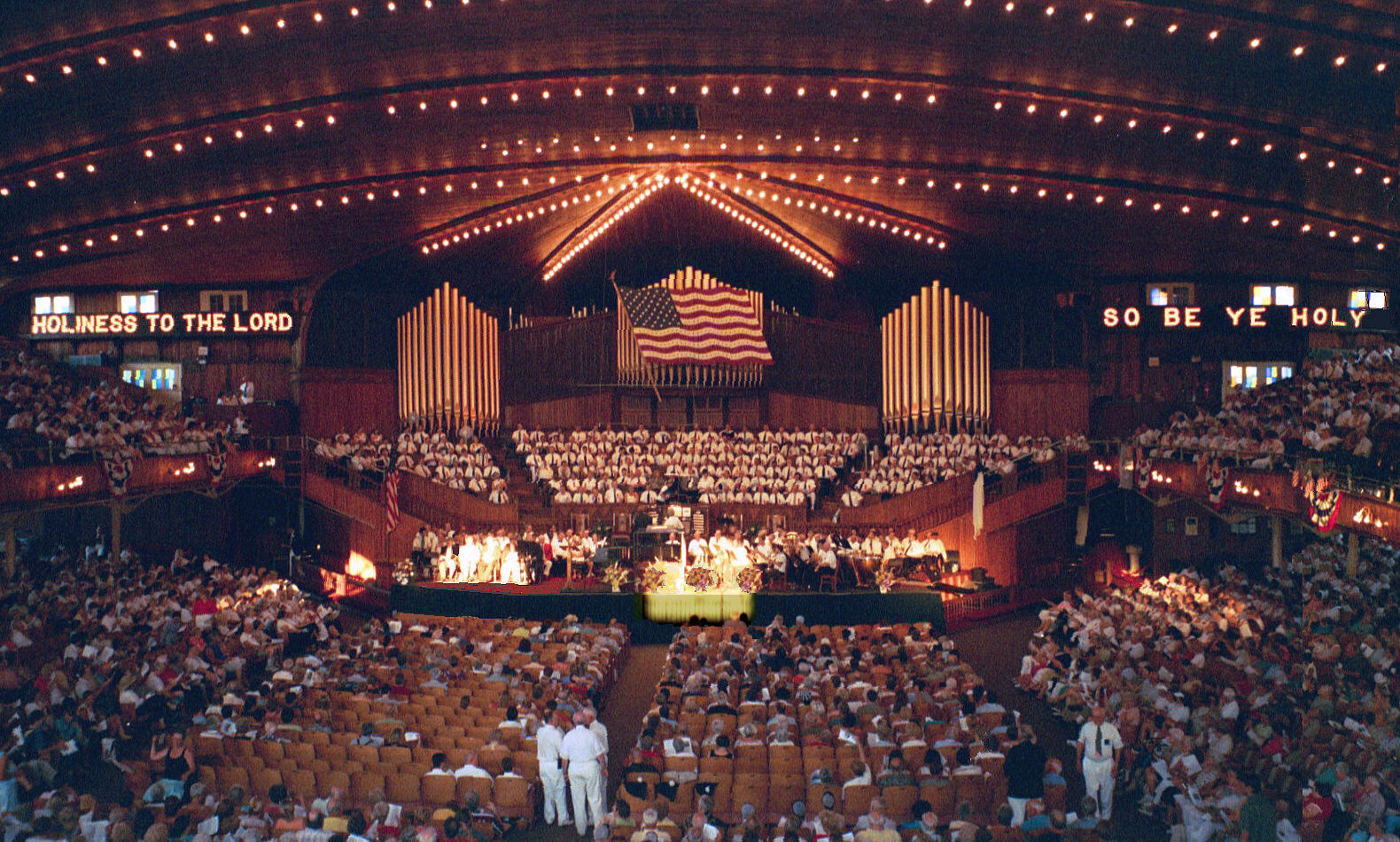
The Ocean Grove Auditorium, New Jersey, where Thewlis frequently preached in the 1960s–1980s

Thewlis' gifts as a preacher and evangelist gained him an international reputation as an effective speaker and resulted in frequent guest-speaking engagements throughout Great Britain and beyond, including numerous appearances in the United States between the 1950s and the 1980s. He spoke with a Yorkshire accent and peppered his sermons with humorous anecdotes, much to the delight of American audiences. Thewlis spoke at a conference in Wilkes-Barre, Pennsylvania, in 1954 and was invited back for a return engagement twelve years later in 1966, the event organizers recalling "the lasting impression that grew out of his stirring Christian message" resulting from his previous visit. Thewlis was a favourite speaker at Ocean Grove, New Jersey, in the 1960s–1980s, and exclaimed over the crowds of 3,000 or more who attended his services there. He tailored his sermons to address the needs of people, applying the truths of God, reported a local newspaper covering a series of Ocean Grove meetings in 1972. Though he had retired from the pulpit at Victoria Hall, Sheffield, by 1986, Thewlis continued speaking at the weeklong Ocean Grove Campmeeting that year.

== Personal life ==
Thewlis was related to Harold Wilson, who was the Labour Party's Prime Minister of the United Kingdom from 1964 to 1970 and 1974 to 1976. Wilson's paternal grandmother was a Thewlis. Wilson and Thewlis were both born in Huddersfield, 15 months apart. Thewlis was a strong supporter of the Labour Party, greeting Wilson personally on a first name basis whenever the Labour Party's annual conference was held in Brighton and its Conference Service was held as part of the Sunday morning service at Dorset Gardens Methodist Church. Thewlis often wore a red pocket square (also called a pocket handkerchief) in the chest pocket of his suit jacket when preaching, subtly indicating his Labour Party support.

Thewlis and his wife, Edna (née Jukes), had been teenage sweethearts and married in Southport in 1943. He died at home on 31 August 1990, aged 72.
