= John Hannah (archdeacon of Lewes) =

John Hannah FRSE (16 July 1818 – 1 June 1888) was a Church of England clergyman and schoolmaster.

== Life ==
He was born in Lincoln, the son of Jane (née Caparn or Capavor, died 1870) and Reverend John Hannah (1792–1867). He was the eldest of eight children, the rest of whom died in infancy or early youth.

Hannah was educated initially by his father, before being sent to St Saviour's Grammar School, Southwark. In March 1837 he matriculated at Brasenose College, Oxford and in May of the same year was elected to a Lincolnshire scholarship at Corpus Christi College, Oxford. In 1840 he graduated with first-class honours in classics, and was elected to a fellow of Lincoln College, Oxford. Hannah was ordained deacon in 1841, taking priest's orders in the following year. He received his Master of Art degree in 1843 and in 1853 was made a Doctor of Canon Law (DCL) by the University of Edinburgh.

== Career ==
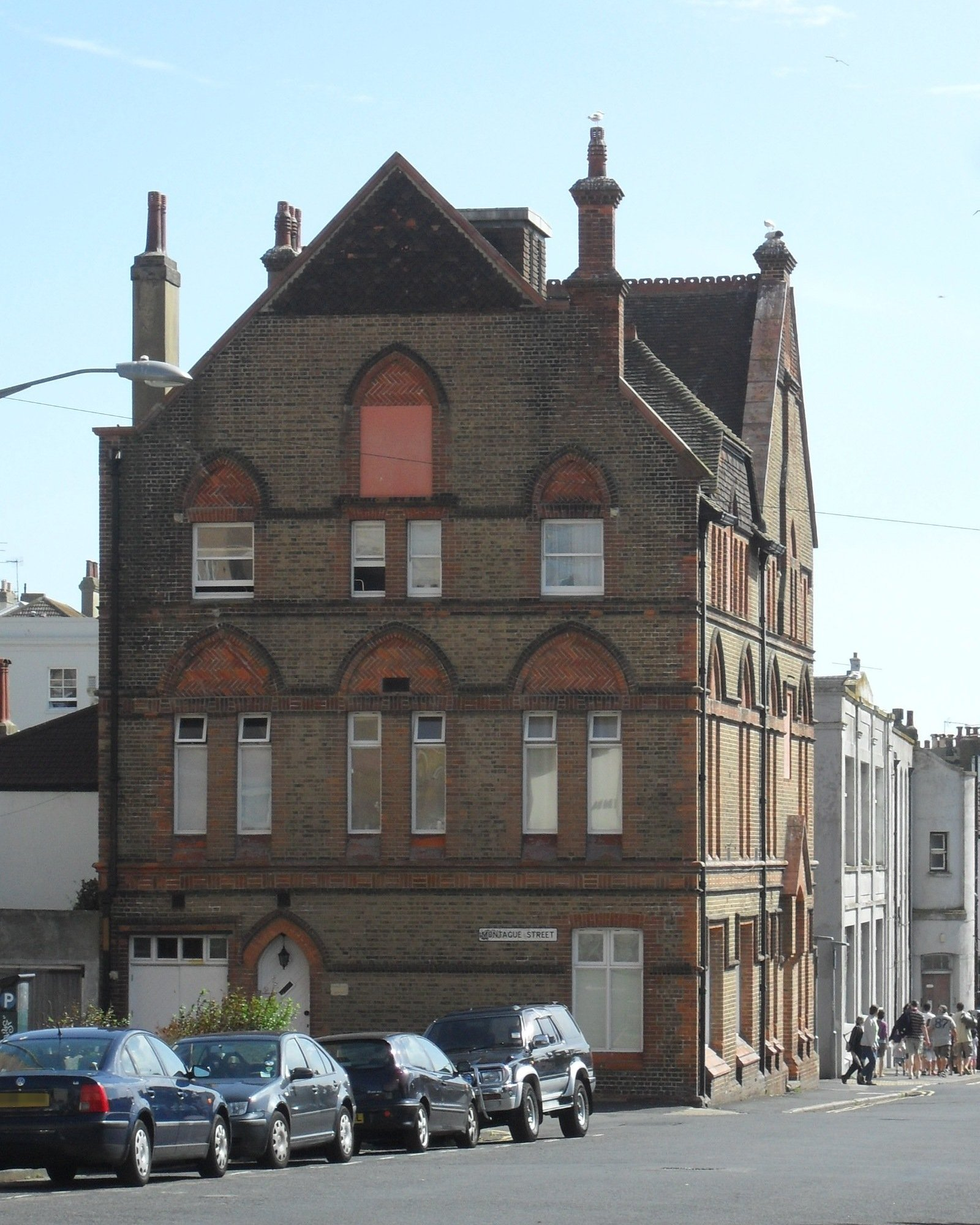
Archdeacon Hannah founded the Pelham Institute in Brighton in 1876.

For some of the time, at Lincoln College, he was a private tutor and coach, then in 1854 he was appointed professor of divinity and warden of Trinity College, Glenalmond, Perthshire. Hannah abandoned teaching in 1870 to become vicar of the parish church of St Nicholas in Brighton, upon the death of the Reverend Henry Michell Wagner. Hannah's son (John Julius Hannah) was immediately appointed curate of the same parish, and they all lived together as a family in the St Nicholas vicarage.

John Hannah was made rural dean of Brighton and Hove in 1871 and also given the prebendal stall of Sidlesham in Chichester Cathedral. He was instrumental in having the parish church of Brighton transferred from St. Nicholas Church to that of St Peter's Church, Brighton. When Hannah moved to St Peter's, in 1873, he left his son as vicar of St Nicholas. In 1876 he was created archdeacon of Lewes, to replace the late Archdeacon Otter, he remained in the post until his death. In the same year, he founded the Pelham Institute—an Anglican "slum mission", working men's club and social venue in the Kemptown area of Brighton. In 1877 he retired from his parish at St Peter's being replaced by his son as vicar.

He died of heart failure on 1 June 1888 and was buried in Brighton in the same vault as his wife, who had died in 1877.
