= Middle Street Synagogue =

Synagogue in Brighton, England

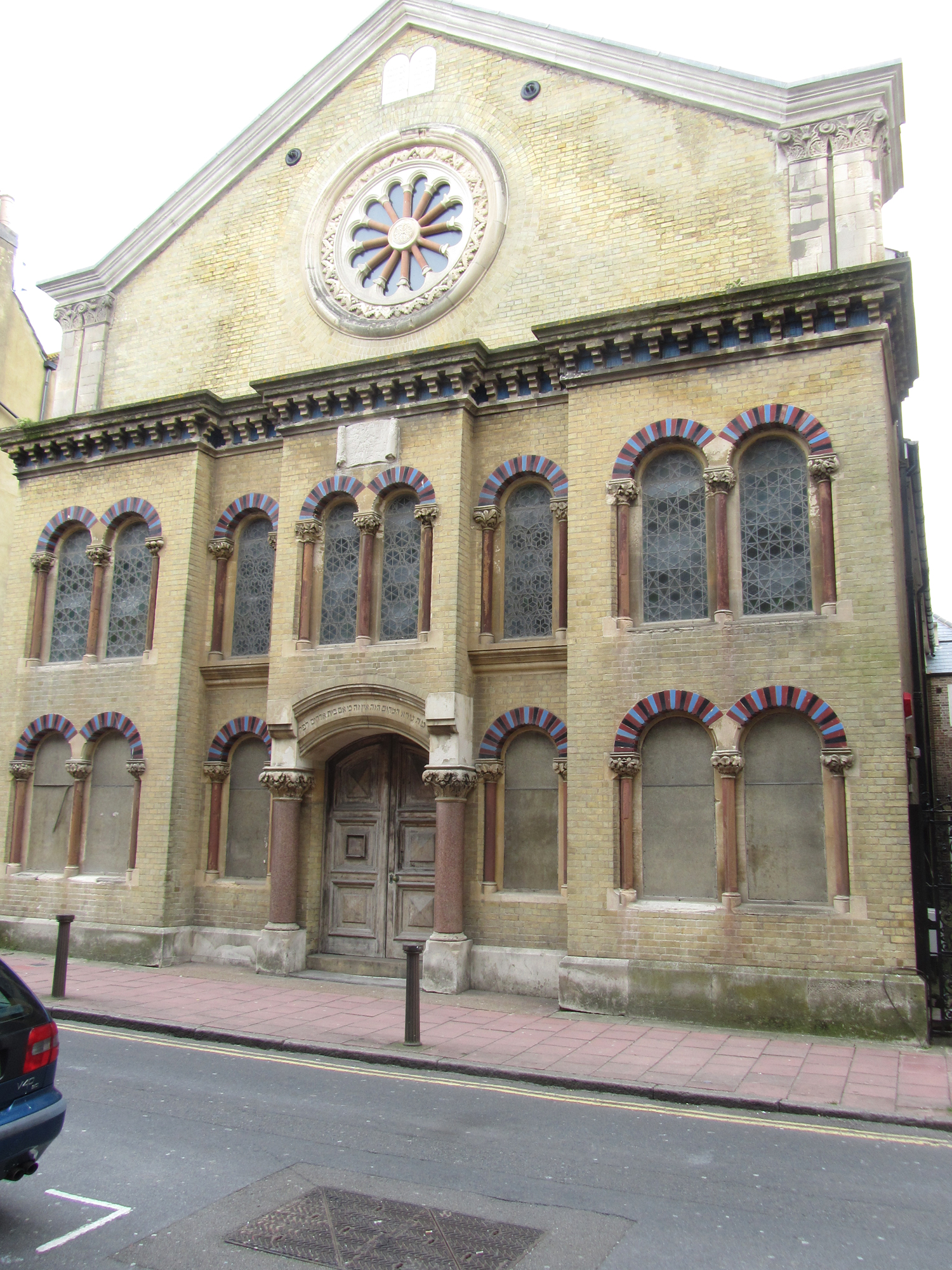
- The façade of the former synagogue in 2012

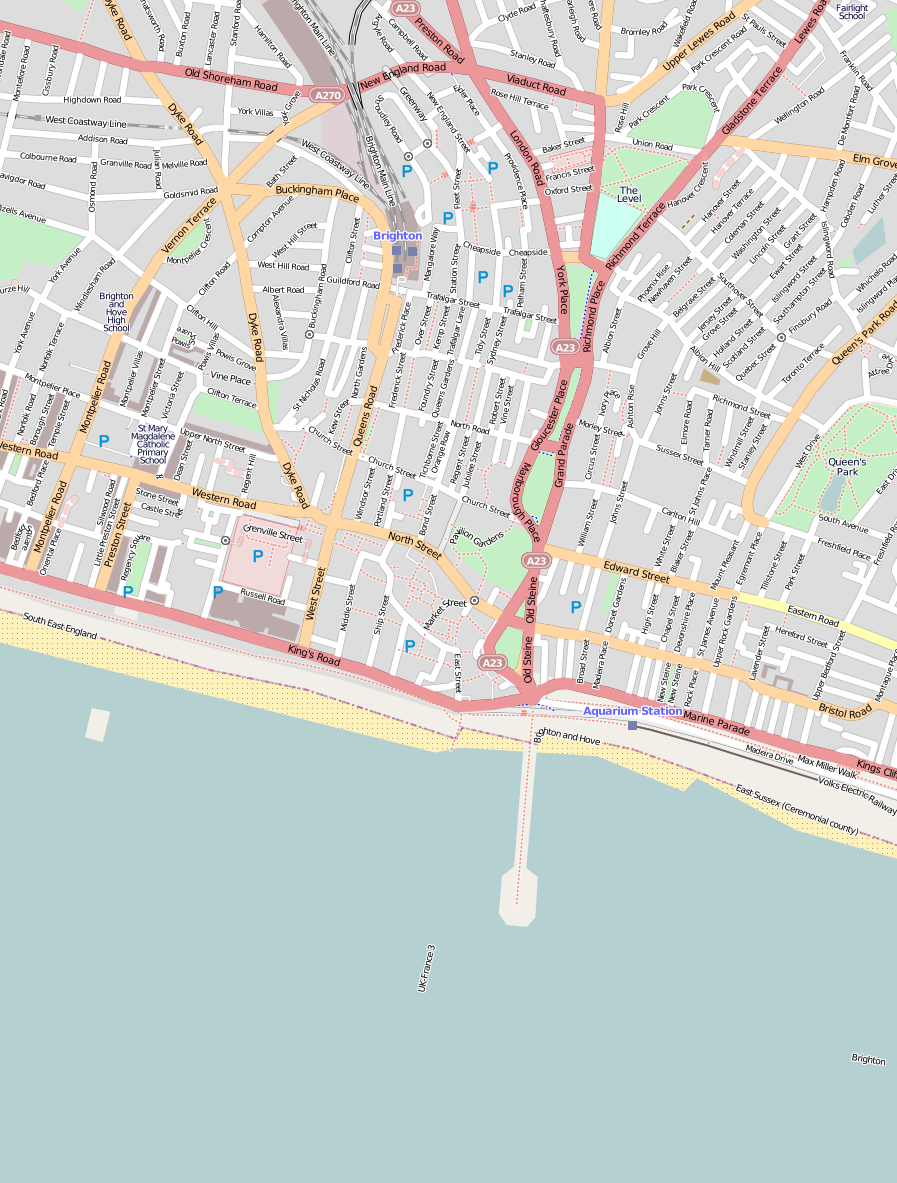
- Location of the synagogue in Brighton

Religion
- Affiliation: Orthodox Judaism
- Rite: Nusach Ashkenaz
- Ecclesiastical or organisational status: Synagogue
- Status: Active; intermittently

Location
- Location: 66 Middle Street, Brighton, Brighton and Hove, Sussex, England
- Country: United Kingdom
- Coordinates: 50°49′16″N 0°8′34″W

Architecture
- Architect: Thomas Lainson
- Type: Synagogue architecture
- Style: Byzantine Revival
- General contractor: George Cheesman and son
- Established: c. 1820s (as a congregation)
- Groundbreaking: 1874
- Completed: 1875
- Construction cost: £12,000 (£1.2 million in 2025)

Specifications
- Direction of façade: West
- Materials: Sussex bricks in an English bond pattern

Listed Building – Grade II*
- Official name: The synagogue and attached gate
- Type: Listed building
- Designated: 19 August 1971
- Reference no.: 1381796

The Middle Street Synagogue is an Orthodox Jewish congregation and synagogue, located at 66 Middle Street, in the centre of Brighton, in the city of Brighton and Hove, Sussex, England, in the United Kingdom. The congregation was formed in c. 1820s as the Brighton Hebrew Congregation and since 1918, was known as the Brighton & Hove Hebrew Congregation, and worshiped in the Ashkenazi rite.

The synagogue building was the centre for Jewish worship in Brighton and Hove for more than a century. The West Hove Synagogue, located at 29-31 New Church Road in Hove, also owned by the Brighton & Hove Hebrew Congregation, has been the congregation's main synagogue since the early 1960s. In March 2023, the congregation moved into a new synagogue on New Church Road, funded with support from the Bloom Foundation. Before its closure, the Middle Street building was opened at certain times for cultural events and weddings. It closed in early 2020 during the COVID-19 pandemic and has remained closed, with water damage and other deterioration to the building. In December 2025, the National Lottery Heritage Fund awarded £112,740 towards a restoration project intended to secure the building and reopen it as a cultural and educational centre, retaining it for occasional services such as weddings. The building was listed as a Grade II* building in 1971.

== History ==
A Jewish community existed in the Brighton area for nearly a century before Middle Street synagogue was built in 1874. A Bavarian settler, Emanuel Hyam Cohen, established a Jewish school on the seafront in the 1780s and a place of worship between 1789 and 1792. The latter moved from Jew Street (off Bond Street) to West Street in 1808, but there is no record of the nature of the buildings; meetings may in fact have taken place in private houses. The Brighton Regency Synagogue was built in 1823 on land leased from a hotel, and enlarged by David Mocatta (architect of Brighton railway station, and member of the prominent Jewish Mocatta family) in 1836. It was used until the new synagogue was opened in Middle Street in 1875. Situated on Devonshire Place, the stuccoed building in the Classical style still stands; an inscription on the outside, including the Hebrew calendar year of opening (5598), can still be seen on the entablature, but it is now in commercial use. The Chanukah menorah at the Middle Synagogue was brought from the Brighton Regency Synagogue.

Chief Rabbi Nathan Marcus Adler attended the start of construction work in Middle Street on 19 November 1874. The architect, Thomas Lainson, had been responsible for many buildings in Hove, including a Congregational church and the residential development on the Wick Farm estate, and also the Bristol Road Methodist Church in Kemptown. After ten months of work at a cost of £12,000 (equivalent to £1.2 million in 2025), the dedication ceremony took place on 23 September 1875 and the synagogue was opened. Its capacity of 300 was six times higher than that of its predecessor.

The Sassoon family, a wealthy Jewish dynasty with links to Brighton and Hove, funded various expansions and improvements over the next few decades, especially in respect of the internal fittings, which are very elaborate for a synagogue. Electric lighting was installed in 1892, making it the first electrically lit synagogue in Britain. Although the Jewish community in the city numbered 4,000 by 2004, the Middle Street Synagogue fell out of regular use at that time, although it is still opened regularly for educational and architectural tours of the interior, especially during the annual Brighton Festival. Urgent structural repairs, including a new roof, were required by that time. A combination of fundraising concerts, auctions and a grant of several hundred thousand pounds from the government agency English Heritage enabled restoration work to take place.

Middle Street Synagogue was listed as a Grade II* building by English Heritage on 20 August 1971, one of seventy Grade II*-listed buildings and structures in the city of Brighton and Hove, as of February 2001. It was also licensed for worship in accordance with the Places of Worship Registration Act 1855 and had the registration number 30824.

== Architecture ==
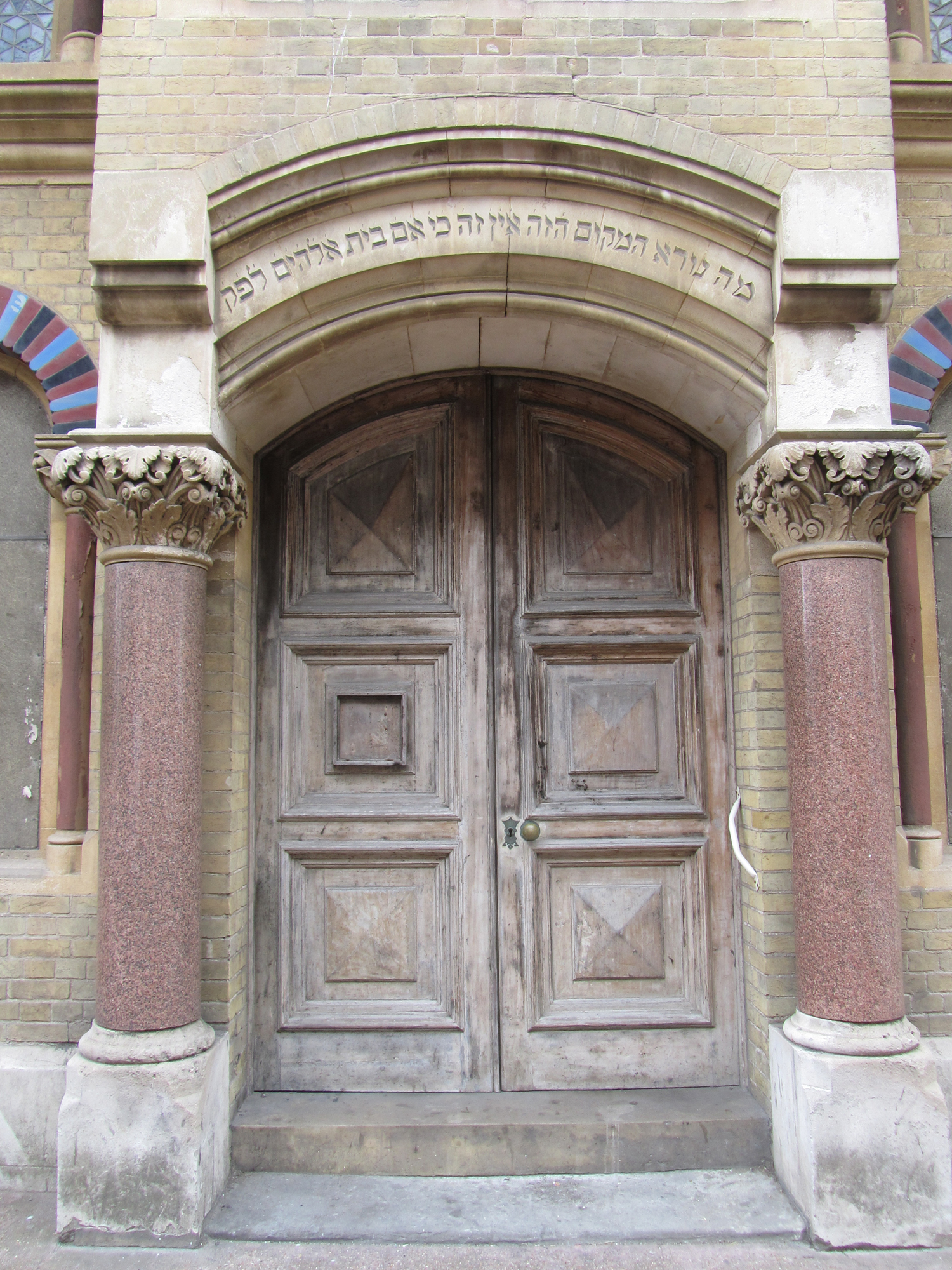
Entrance

The synagogue was described as Brighton's second most important historic building, behind the Royal Pavilion.

The exterior, executed in pale Sussex brick by the builders George Cheesman and son, is in an eclectic blend of Italian Renaissance and Byzantine Revival styles. The west-facing elevation to Middle Street uses yellow bricks in an English bond pattern, while the other walls are of brown brick. The arched windows are surmounted by contrasting red and blue tiles, and are flanked by red coloured columns. There is a large rose window in the west-facing frontage. The façade consists of five bays, alternately projecting and recessed; on the ground floor the layout of windows (protected since the 1960s with translucent safety panels) is two in each end bay and one each in the two recessed bays, with the wooden entrance door on the centre bay (between two pink columns with ornamented capitals). On the first floor, the eight windows are arranged in pairs on the three projecting bays, with one in each of the recesses.

Sharman Kadish remarks that "Nothing prepares the visitor for the sumptuousness of Middle Street's interior." There are ladies' galleries on three sides, held up by cast-iron columns decorated with imitation marble-effect paintwork with gilded metalwork capitals depicting plants, fruit, flowers and crops from the Middle East region. Thomas Lainson's design for the interior followed the Byzantine Revival style. The building takes the form of a basilica. There are ladies' galleries on three sides, held up by cast-iron columns decorated with imitation marble-effect paintwork. The capitals are fashioned of hammered copper and iron, each one is individually worked to show a different one of the species of plants, fruit, flowers and crops from the Land of Israel.

The particularly decorative and ornate interior, funded by the generosity of the Sassoon family and visitors from outside Brighton, was built mostly of iron, but the surfaces that meet the eye are lavishly stenciled, gilded, or made of brass, marble, and mosaics. The Torah Ark sits on a marble-stepped dais in the centre of the apse, below an arch supported by elaborate columns. It is top-lit via a stained glass half-dome. The surrounding rails, menorah and pulpit are all brass. There is late-19th century stained glass in all of the windows, much of it by Campbell & Smith.

== See also ==
- History of the Jews in England
- List of Jewish communities in the United Kingdom
- List of synagogues in the United Kingdom
