= John Hannah (Methodist) =

English Wesleyan Methodist minister

John Hannah D.D., called the elder (1792–1867) was an English Wesleyan Methodist minister.

== Life ==
Born at Lincoln on 3 November 1792, he was the third son of a coal-dealer. His parents were Wesleyan Methodists in Lincoln. He received his early education from local teachers, mainly from the Rev. W. Gray, a senior vicar of the cathedral: he knew the classics, and studied French, mathematics, and Hebrew.

Hannah helped his father in his trade, and at an early age became a Wesleyan preacher in villages around Lincoln, preaching his first sermon at Waddington. He expressed an interest during 1813 in Thomas Coke's mission to India, though the anticipated vacancy did not occur. In 1814 he was received into the Wesleyan ministry.

In 1824 Hannah was sent to America to a Wesleyan conference. He was in 1834 appointed tutor of the Wesleyan Theological Institution, at Hoxton and then at Stoke Newington. From 1840 to 1842 and from 1854 to 1858 he was secretary, and in 1842 and again in 1851 president of the Wesleyan conference. In 1843 he was appointed to the theological tutorship of the northern branch of the Institution for training ministers, at Didsbury in Yorkshire, which he held till within a few months of his death.

In 1856 Hannah crossed the Atlantic a second time, accompanied by Frederick James Jobson, as the representative of English Methodism to Methodists of the United States. For many years before his death he was chairman of the district of the Methodist connexion of the Manchester area. He died at Didsbury on Sunday, 29 December 1867, shortly after resigning his tutorship.

== Works ==
Hannah published, with memorial sermons and short tracts:

- Memoirs of the Rev. D. Stowe, 1828.
- Memoirs of the Rev. T. Lessey, 1842.
- Documents relating to the Dissolution of the Union between the British and Canadian Conferences; with an Appendix, 1841.
- Ministerial Training an Inaugural Address at Didsbury, 1860.
- Infant Baptism scriptural, and Immersion unnecessary; with an Appendix on Re-baptising, 1866.
- Introductory Lectures on the Study of Christian Theology, London, no date.

== Family ==
In 1817 Hannah married Jane Capavor, by whom he had eight children, of whom only one survived him, John Hannah, the younger, vicar of Brighton.

== Notes ==
Attribution

This article incorporates text from a publication now in the public domain: Stephen, Leslie; Lee, Sidney, eds. (1890). "Hannah, John (1792-1867)". Dictionary of National Biography. Vol. 24. London: Smith, Elder & Co.
