= 75 Holland Road, Hove =

Building in Hove, England

Palmeira Yard, 75 Holland Road
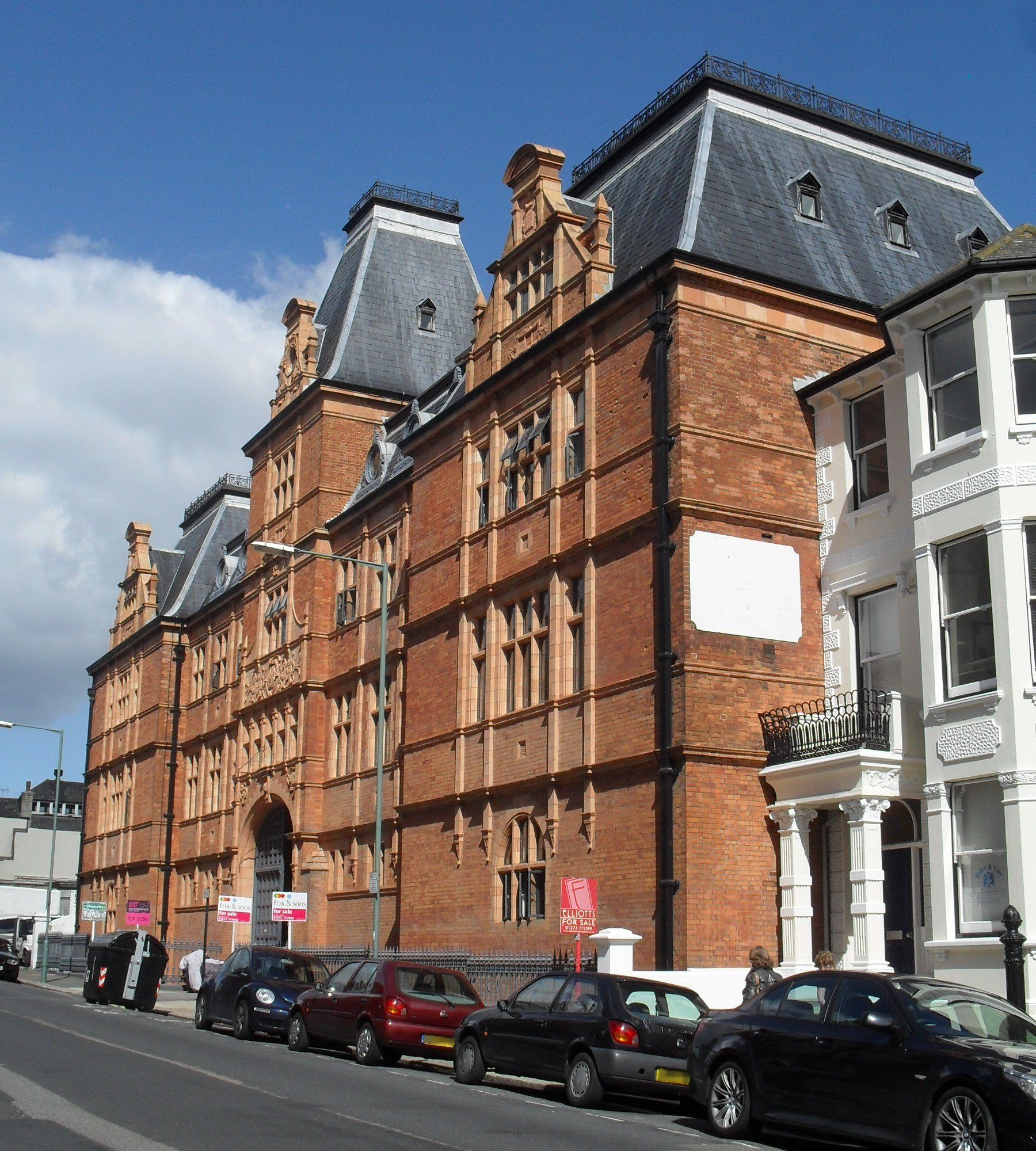
- The building from the southwest

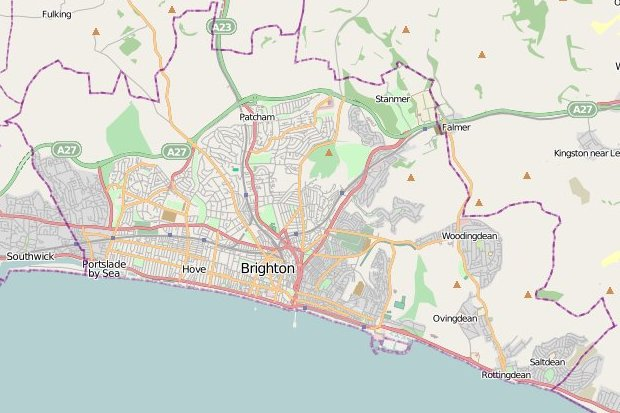
- Location within Brighton and Hove
- 50.8276°N 0.1613°W
- Location: 75 Holland Road, Hove, Brighton and Hove BN3 1JN, United Kingdom

History
- Built: 1893
- Built for: Brighton & Hove Co-operative Supply Association

Site notes
- Architect: Thomas Lainson
- Architectural style: French Second Empire

Listed Building – Grade II
- Official name: 75 Holland Road
- Designated: 31 May 1974
- Reference no.: 1187561

75 Holland Road in Hove, part of the English coastal city of Brighton and Hove, is now in residential use as loft-style apartments called Palmeira Yard, but was originally a repository belonging to the Brighton & Hove Co-operative Supply Association, the main cooperative business organisation in the area. Elaborately designed in 1893 in the French Second Empire style by local architect Thomas Lainson of the firm Lainson & Sons, the storage building had built-in stables and was lavishly decorated with terracotta. After a period of ownership by haulage and removals company Pickfords, who used the building for furniture storage, a local architecture firm carried out the conversion into mixed-use live-work units between 2004 and 2006. English Heritage has listed the building at Grade II for its architectural and historical importance.

== History ==
The seaside resort of Brighton, on the English Channel coast, developed rapidly from the mid-18th century, and by the late 19th century it was a large town was significant regional importance as a commercial centre. Neighbouring Hove developed later in response to Brighton's growth, principally as a residential area with streets of spacious, high-quality houses.

Brighton was a pioneer in the cooperative movement: it adopted Robert Owen's ideas very early, and England's first co-operative store opened on West Street in 1828. A journal, The Co-operator, was started soon afterwards by local doctor William King; it helped inspire the Rochdale Pioneers and other early cooperatives in England. Other associations were formed elsewhere in Brighton and Hove in 1846, 1860 and 1887. By the 1880s, the Brighton & Hove Co-operative Supply Association, based in Hove, was one of the main groups; they needed more space in the town for their operations, especially for storage, and they appointed local architecture firm Lainson & Sons as their in-house architects. The firm consisted of Thomas Lainson, a Brighton man who had designed buildings of all types around the two towns since the early 1860s, and his sons Thomas J. and Arthur.

Their first building for the Association was Palmeira House, an office building designed in 1887. It stood at the top of the late Regency/Italianate Palmeira Square residential development, and the Lainsons' design complemented this. Six years later, the Association required an annexe to Palmeira House, to be used for storage of large and fragile items, distribution and the stabling of horses and early motor vehicles. Assisted by his sons, Thomas Lainson designed and built the repository in 1893. Its elaborate design, in red brick with extensive use of terracotta and wrought iron and with a steep roof, contrasted with the formal stucco of Palmeira House and the surrounding area. A plaque installed over the entrance recorded the date and architects' names.

The removal and distribution company Pickfords took over the building in 1950. For several decades thereafter, they used it as a furniture repository; the interior was divided into storage units, and the commemorative plaque was moved inside to the courtyard where the former stables stood. Early in the 21st century, the building was sold, and the Brighton studio of R H Partnership Architects were commissioned to convert the interior into 20 loft apartments which could also be used as live-work units. Work took place between July 2004 and 2006.

The former repository was listed at Grade II by English Heritage on 31 May 1974. As of February 2001, it was one of 1,124 Grade II-listed buildings and structures, and 1,218 listed buildings of all grades, in the city of Brighton and Hove. Another Grade II-listed building—John Wills' Purbeck stone Gothic Revival Holland Road Baptist Church of 1887—stands at 71 Holland Road to the south, and the Jugendstil-inspired Hove Hebrew Congregation Synagogue is just north of the former repository at number 79, on the corner of Lansdowne Road.

== Architecture ==
The repository has been described as a "fine work" by the prolific Thomas Lainson. It was designed distinctively in the French Second Empire style with some Queen Anne elements. Lainson made lavish use of terracotta to decorate the building, which is mostly of red brick with slate mansard roofs. The design is U-shaped and encloses a gated courtyard. Apart from the centre bay on the Holland Road (western) elevation, which rises to four storeys with an attic storey above, the building is three-storey with attics. The Holland Road façade has nine bays in a 1:3:1:3:1 formation, the three-bay sections being slightly recessed. The outermost bays are topped by elaborate gables which hide the attic space; the centre bay also has an ornately treated gable at roof level, containing round porthole-style timber-framed windows. Some of the other windows have prominent transoms and mullions of terracotta; they vary between round-headed and flat-arched. The doorway is also arched, this time in the segmental style. The roofs are steep and are topped with parapets of wrought iron.

== See also ==
- Media related to 75 Holland Road, Hove at Wikimedia Commons
- Grade II listed buildings in Brighton and Hove: E–H

== Bibliography ==
- Antram, Nicholas; Morrice, Richard (2008). Brighton and Hove. Pevsner Architectural Guides. London: Yale University Press. ISBN 978-0-300-12661-7.
- Brighton Polytechnic. School of Architecture and Interior Design (1987). A Guide to the Buildings of Brighton. Macclesfield: McMillan Martin. ISBN 1-869865-03-0.
- Collis, Rose (2010). The New Encyclopaedia of Brighton. (based on the original by Tim Carder) (1st ed.). Brighton: Brighton & Hove Libraries. ISBN 978-0-9564664-0-2.
- Musgrave, Clifford (1981). Life in Brighton. Rochester: Rochester Press. ISBN 0-571-09285-3.
