= Dorset Gardens Methodist Church =

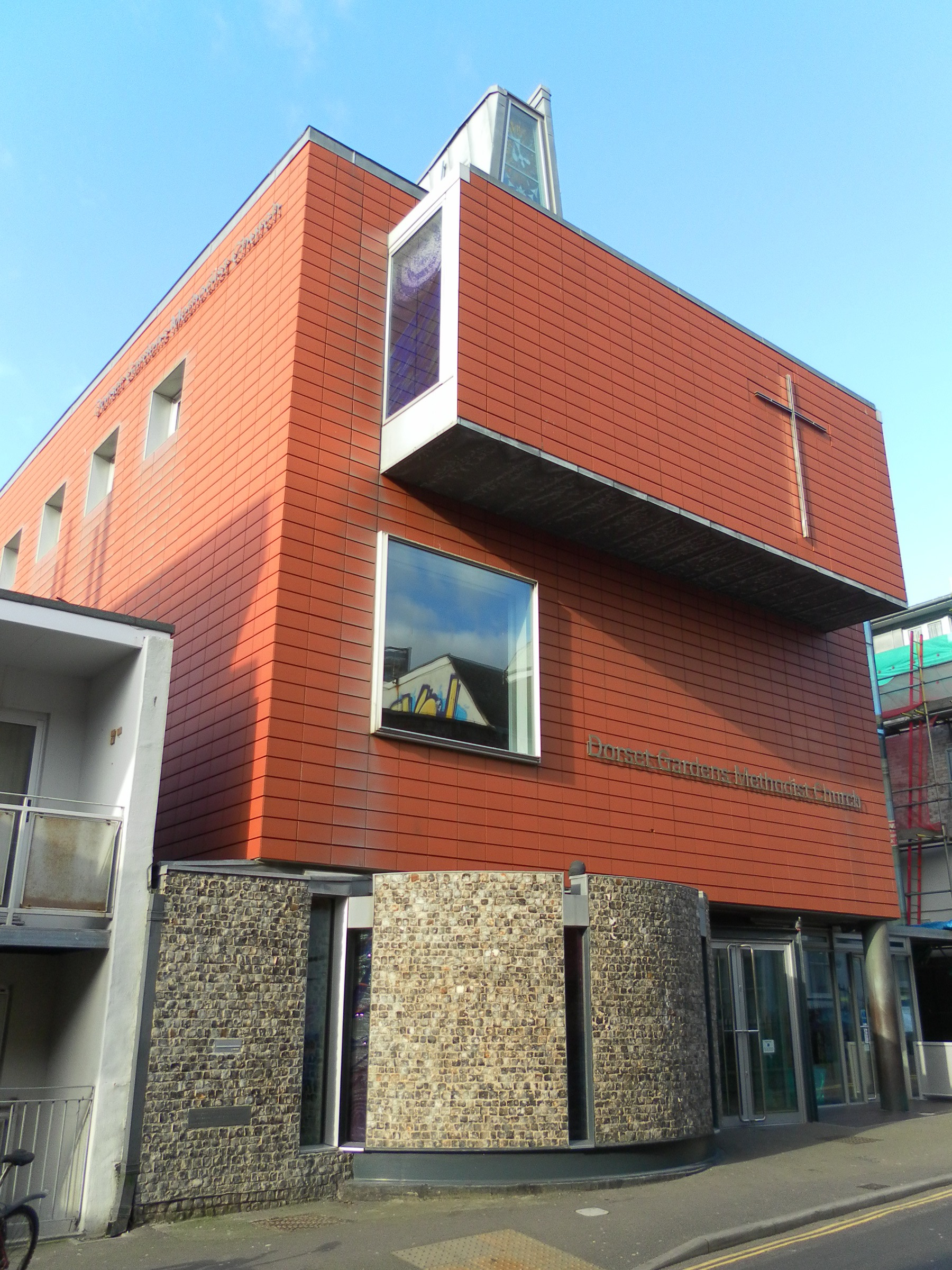
- The church from the southeast
- Dorset Gardens Methodist Church
- 50°49′16″N 0°8′2″W
- OS grid reference: TQ 31540 04056
- Location: Dorset Gardens, Kemptown, Brighton and Hove, East Sussex
- Country: England
- Denomination: Methodist Church of Great Britain
- Website: www.dgmc.org.uk

History
- Founded: 1808 (first church on site)

Architecture
- Functional status: Active
- Architect(s): Saville Jones Architects, Worthing
- Completed: April 2003
- Construction cost: £1,600,000

Specifications
- Materials: Red brick, concrete, red tiles, flint, glass

The Dorset Gardens Methodist Church is a Methodist church in the Kemptown area of the city of Brighton and Hove, East Sussex, England. Although it is a modern building—completed in 2003—it is the third Methodist place of worship on the site: it replaced an older, larger church which was in turn a rebuilding of Brighton's first Methodist church. Between them, the churches have played an important part in the history of Methodism in Brighton.

== History ==
On 26 August 1808, Brighton's first Methodist church opened on the west side of Dorset Gardens, a street running northwards from St James's Street—a main route eastwards out of Brighton. The opposite side of Dorset Gardens had been developed with large houses in the 1790s. The church, which followed the Wesleyan Methodist doctrine, was built in red brick with rounded windows and a square entrance porch, Three of the four interior sides of the square building were galleried, and the church's choir occupied one section. In about 1840, a hall, gas lighting, new entrance (leading on to Dorset Gardens itself) and pipe organ were added. The minister at the time (1855) did not want the church to have an organ, however, and was not present at the dedication ceremony.

Another red-brick building, somewhat larger and with an Italianate tower, was designed and constructed by Liverpool-based architect C. O. Ellison in 1884, with a new organ and electric lighting added in 1894. The brick was set off by terracotta dressings at regular intervals, and the overall style appears to have been influenced by Renaissance architecture. A large extension was built on the south side in 1929, and it is this part of the site upon which the present church stands. This was opened in April 2003, three years after the 1884 building was demolished, and cost £1.6 million.

Between 1967 and August, 1975, Frank Thewlis was minister at the church, preaching on Sunday mornings. He also preached weekly at the Brighton Dome Concert Hall on Sunday evenings during that period.

The church is licensed for worship in accordance with the Places of Worship Registration Act 1855 and has the registration number 61833.

== Architecture ==
At street level the church protrudes onto the pavement and is constructed of squared cut knapped flint; the upper storeys are constructed in red brick and concrete with large areas of glass and a mostly tiled exterior. The interior has many rooms and configurations, and the top floor is partly lit by a glass-faced tower. The design, created by a Worthing-based firm, won a local award in 2003.

== The church today ==
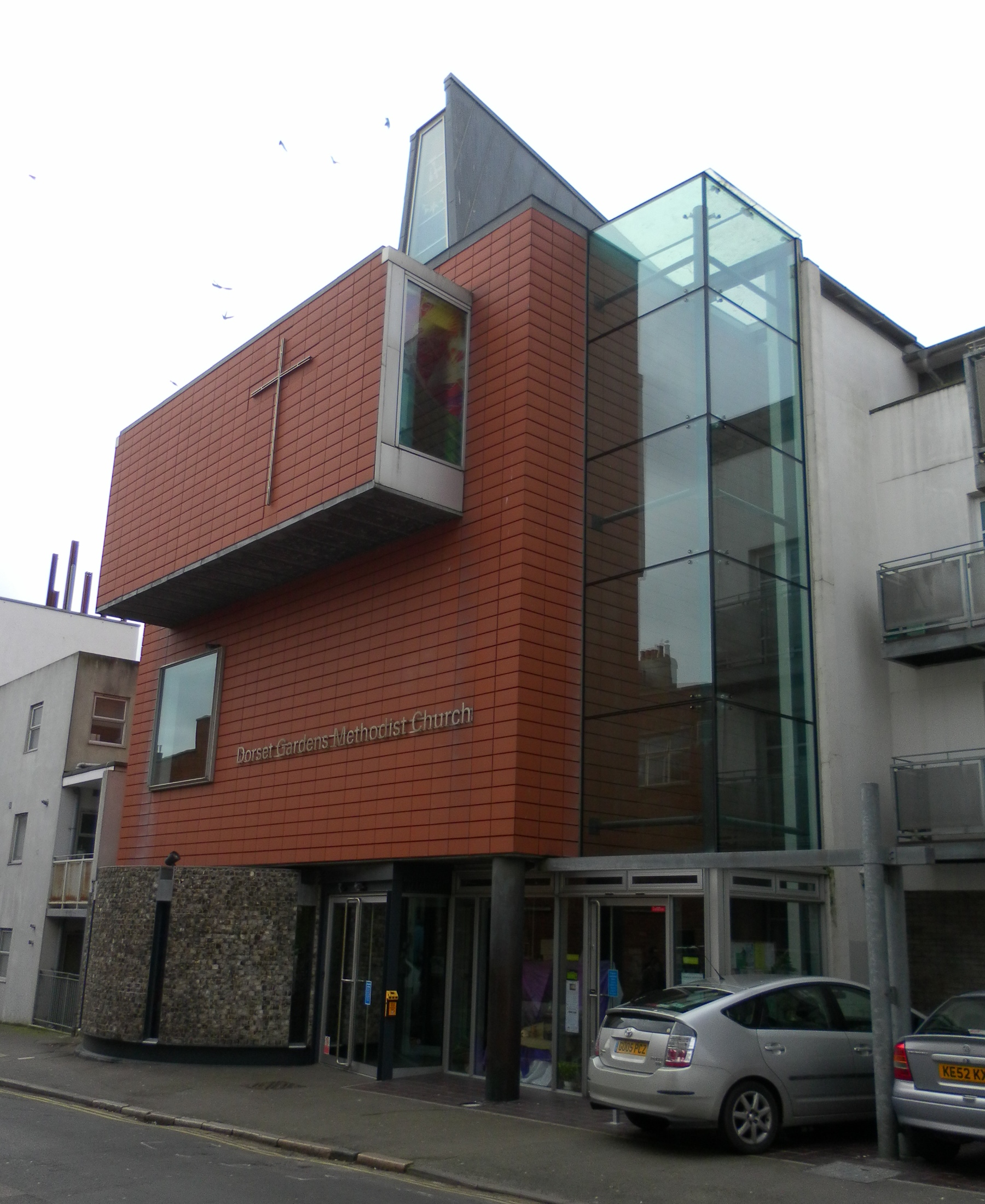
Church building in March 2013

As well as weekly services and prayer evenings, a wide range of community activities take place weekly or monthly, including exercise classes, Scout meetings, Alcoholics Anonymous meetings and a weekly lunch club for the local HIV-affected community.

== See also ==
- Hove Methodist Church
- List of places of worship in Brighton and Hove

== Bibliography ==
- Carder, Timothy (1990). The Encyclopaedia of Brighton. Lewes: East Sussex County Libraries. ISBN 0-86147-315-9.
