= Hove Museum of Creativity =

Museum in Hove, England

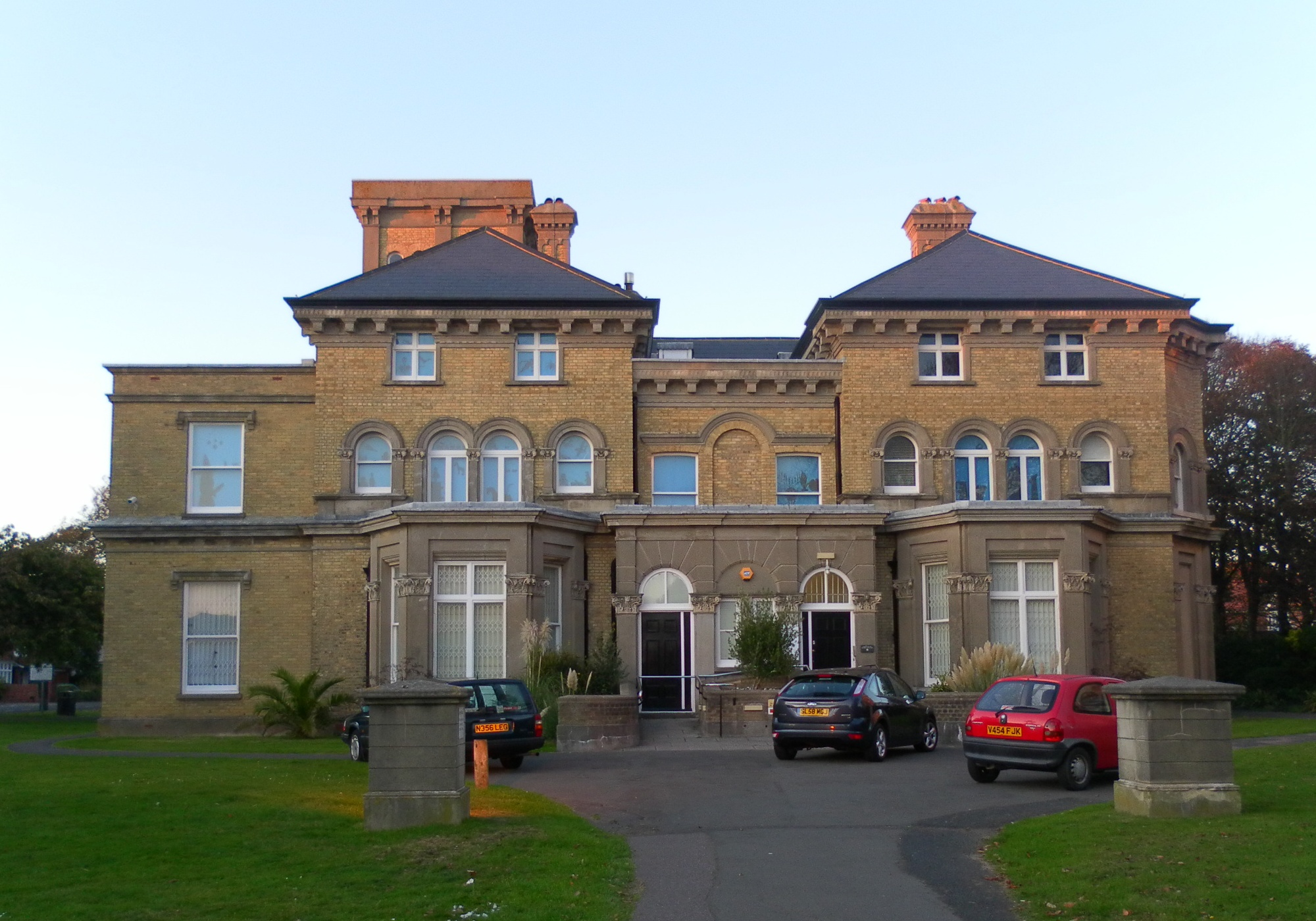
- The museum is housed in Brooker Hall, originally a villa.
- Established: 1927
- Location: Hove
- Coordinates: 50.8297°N 0.1812°W
- Website: Website

Hove Museum of Creativity is a municipally owned museum in the town of Hove, which is part of the larger city of Brighton and Hove in the South East of England. The museum is part of Brighton & Hove Museums, and admission is free. Opened in 1927 by the Hove Corporation, the museum is located in a late 19th-century villa originally known as Brooker Hall.

The museum has a toy gallery, called the Wizard's Attic, that includes a collection of dolls, teddy bears, mechanical toys, toy trains, dollhouses, rocking horses and tricycles. Another focus is contemporary crafts and fine art. The museum also includes local history displays, and a collection of early cinema artifacts from the 1890s and 1900s.

The toy collection traces its origins back to the 1950s, when Leslie Daiken founded the National Toy Museum and Institute of Play.

Brooker Hall was constructed in 1877 by the architect Thomas Lainson for Major John Vallance. The building is in the Italianate style made popular by Osborne House, Queen Victoria's residence on the Isle of Wight. It stands in grounds now laid out as a public park. During the First World War, the hall was used to house a contingent of German prisoners of war who were put to work at the local gas works or on nearby farms.
