= Umi hotels =

British budget hotel chain

umi Hotels
- Company type: Private
- Industry: Hospitality industry
- Founded: 2007
- Headquarters: 16 Leinster Square, Bayswater, London, W2 4PR
- Key people: Founder; Steve Lowy
- Website: umihotels.com

umi Hotels is a budget hotel chain based in Leinster Square in Bayswater, London. They have hotels in London, Brighton and Moscow.

== History ==
umi Hotels was founded by Steve Lowy. umi's first hotel was previously known as The Westminster Hotel, this was changed to umi Bayswater, umi Hotel and eventually umi Hotel London as the company expanded to incorporate a Brighton seafront hotel previously known as The Belgrave Hotel, which would become umi Hotel Brighton. At the end of 2009 umi expanded to incorporate a Central Moscow hotel known as Petrovka Loft.

In 2010 umi incorporated Petrovka Loft Hotel Moscow as its first franchised hotel.
