= Kemptown, Brighton =

Area of Brighton, Sussex, England

Coordinates: 50°49′08″N 0°07′21″W

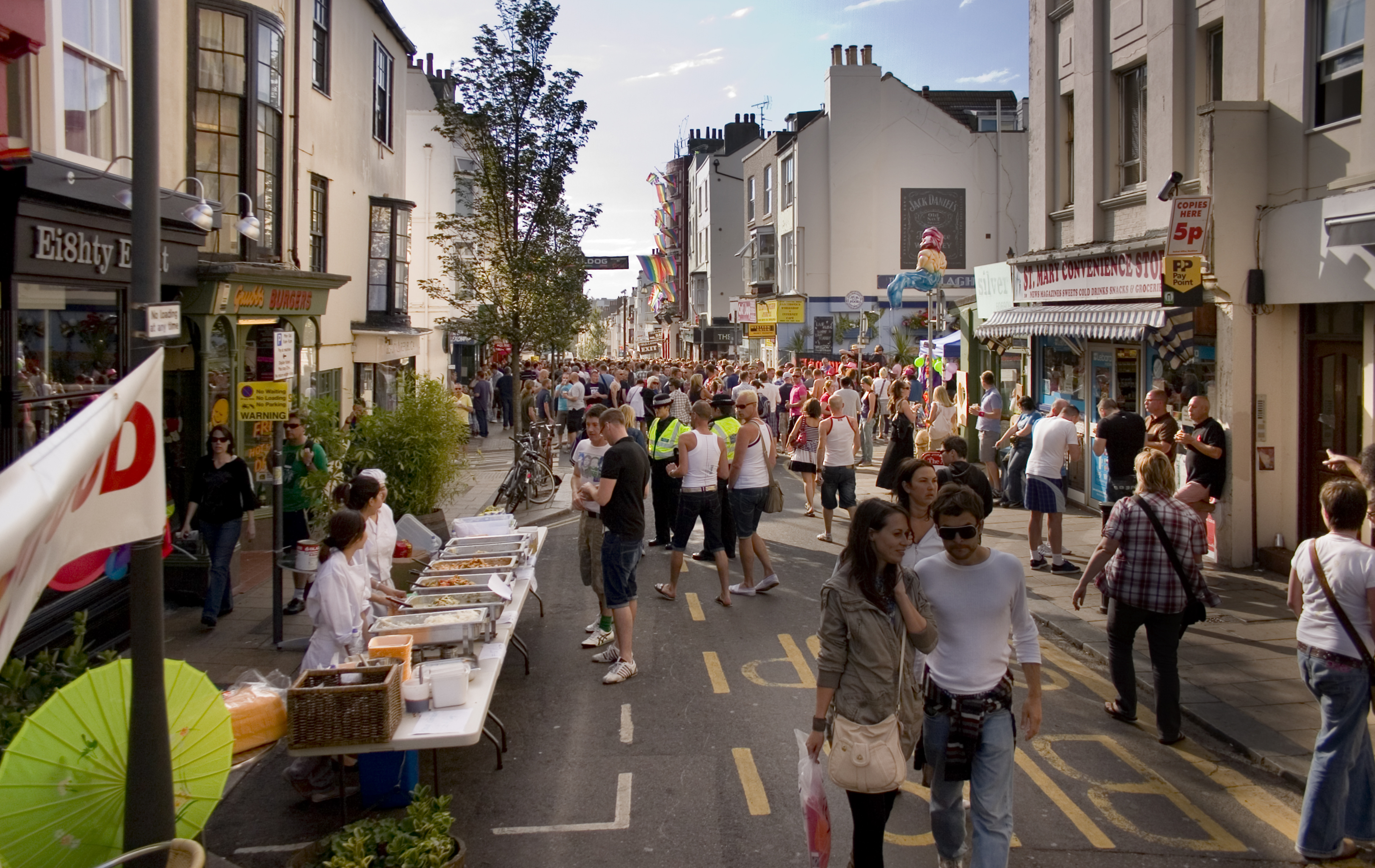
St James's Street, Kemptown, closed to traffic during Brighton Pride

Kemptown is a small community running along the King's Cliff from the Old Steine to Black Rock in the east of Brighton, East Sussex, England it includes the Kemp Town residential estate known as Sussex Square and Lewes Crescent to its eastern end. It is wholly in the parliamentary constituency of Brighton Kemptown and Peacehaven.

As of the 2021 Census, the Kemptown Intermediate Zone (MSOA) area (which does not include the Kemp Town Estate or the gay village in St James' Street) has the highest percentage of residents identifying as LGB+ out of any MSOA in the UK with 20.11%.

It was a local government ward called "Kemp Town" from 1894 to 1908, then called King's Cliff from 1908 with various boundaries until its abolition in 2003. It was recreated as a local government ward usually called Kemptown Ward in 2023 covering the area south of Edward Street and Eastern Road from the Old Steine to Black Rock including all of the Kemp Town estate.

== History ==
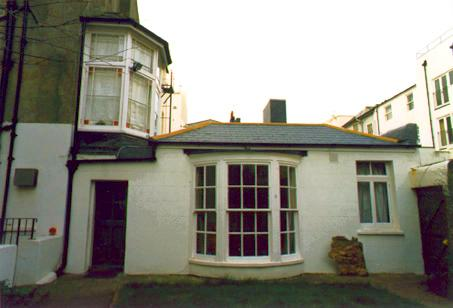
Typically individual Kemptown domestic property

The area takes its name from Thomas Read Kemp's Kemp Town residential estate of the early 19th Century, but the one-word name now refers to an area larger than the original development and is traditionally called King's Cliff. Much of the housing is slightly later but still of the Regency style, although there is also Victorian architecture and some more modern buildings. Conversions of grand Regency buildings into flats and bars has provided Kemptown with some distinctive properties; one club is housed within the Sassoon Mausoleum, the former burial chamber of Edward Sassoon.

In the nineteenth century, Kemptown was home to the Brighton Institute for Deaf and Dumb Children, at 127-132 Eastern Road (now demolished), opposite Brighton College. One of its inmates was Richard Aslatt Pearce, the first deaf ordained Anglican clergyman.

Since 1950, the locality has given its name to the Brighton Kemptown parliamentary constituency, covering a wider area of eastern Brighton and at times Peacehaven.

== Location and surrounding areas ==
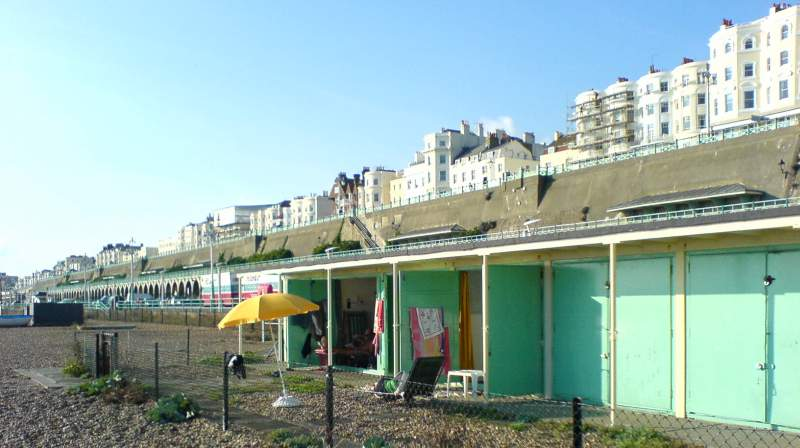
Municipal beach huts below King's Cliff (Kemptown)

Central Brighton is to the west of the area. Travelling inland (north) from Kemptown one finds Queen's Park above the western portion of Kemptown. Further to the east are the Bristol Estate, Craven Vale estate, and Whitehawk, sometimes collectively known as "East Brighton". Returning south to the seafront, Kemptown's easterly neighbours are Black Rock and then Roedean. Also within walking distance is Brighton Marina.

== Community and facilities ==
Historically known as an actors' and artists' quarter, it has a sizeable LGBT community and a network of streets with specialised shops, hotels, cafés and pubs. The annual Brighton Pride Village Party takes place in the western part of Kemptown closing off parts of St James' Street, Marine Parade and surrounding streets.

Community spaces predominately are based in religious buildings including The Crypt at St. George's Church, Fitzherbert Community Hub at St John the Baptist's Church, and community facilities at both St Mary Church Kemp Town and Dorset Gardens Methodist Church.

The Royal Sussex County Hospital is located on the northern edge of Kemptown.

Kemptown Carnival was held each year but hasn't been held since 2019 with the 2023 production cancelled at the last moment.

== Transport ==
Kemptown gained a railway station in 1869. The line, featuring two viaducts and a tunnel, was built at great cost partly to block the route for other railways from London. The railway lost out to bus traffic (the route from Brighton was longer than the road journey) and was closed to passenger traffic in 1933, surviving for freight until the 1970s.

There remain a number of bus services through Kemptown, and the Volk's Electric Railway passes the area along the beach.

== See also ==
- List of gay villages
