= Grade II listed buildings in Brighton and Hove: E–H =

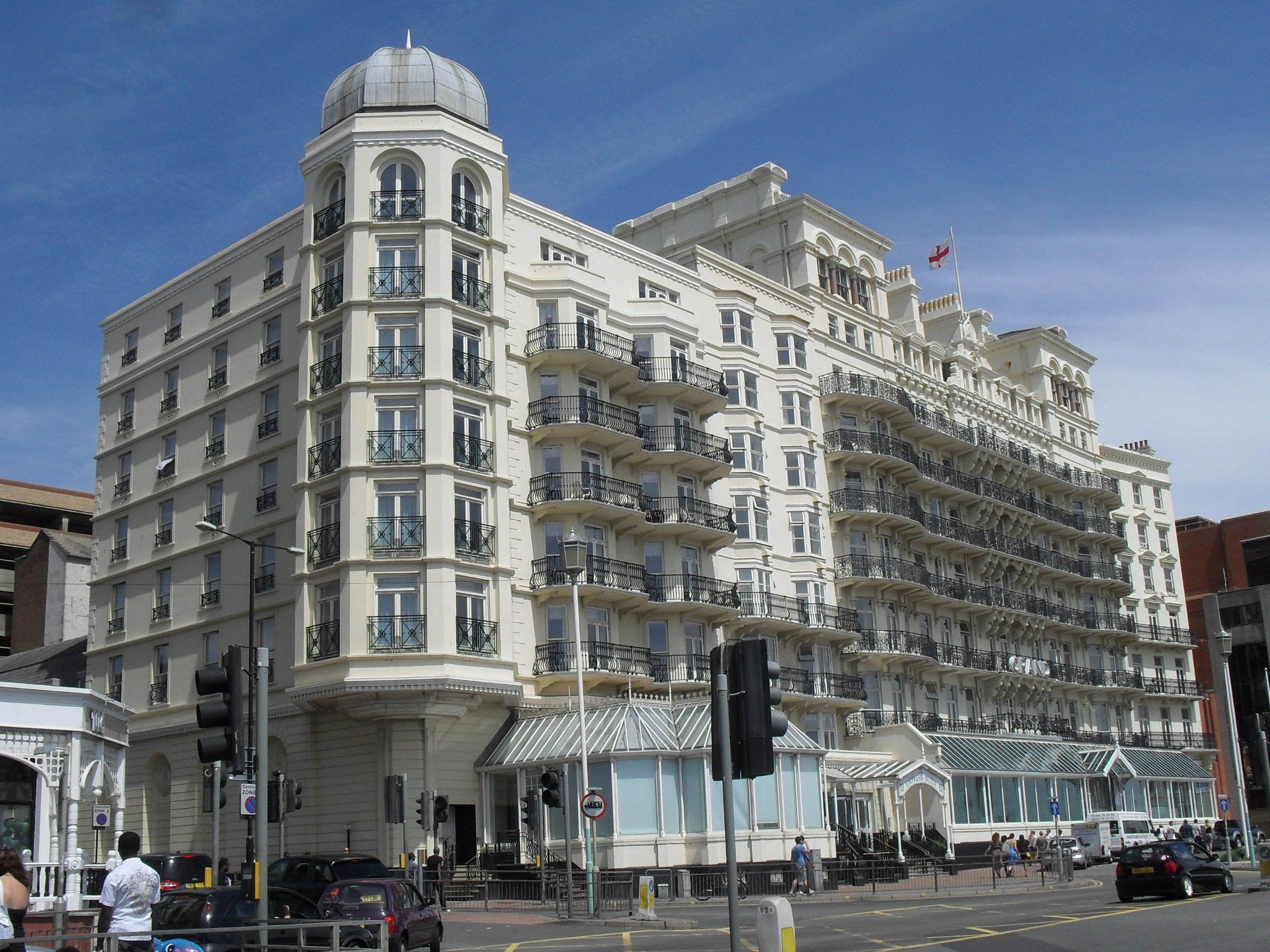
John Whichcord Jr.'s Grand Hotel, finished in 1862, was Brighton's tallest building at the time, and its largest and most luxurious hotel. It was restored after a bomb attack in 1984.

As of February 2001, there were 1,124 listed buildings with Grade II status in the English city of Brighton and Hove. The total at 2009 was similar. The city, on the English Channel coast approximately 52 miles (84 km) south of London, was formed as a unitary authority in 1997 by the merger of the neighbouring towns of Brighton and Hove. Queen Elizabeth II granted city status in 2000.

In England, a building or structure is defined as "listed" when it is placed on a statutory register of buildings of "special architectural or historic interest" by the Secretary of State for Culture, Media and Sport, a Government department, in accordance with the Planning (Listed Buildings and Conservation Areas) Act 1990. English Heritage, a non-departmental public body, acts as an agency of this department to administer the process and advise the department on relevant issues. There are three grades of listing status. The Grade II designation is the lowest, and is used for "nationally important buildings of special interest". Grade II* is used for "particularly important buildings of more than special interest"; there are 69 such buildings in the city. There are also 24 Grade I listed buildings (defined as being of "exceptional interest" and greater than national importance, and the highest of the three grades) in Brighton and Hove.

This list summarises 129 Grade II-listed buildings and structures whose names begin with E, F, G or H. Numbered buildings with no individual name are listed by the name of the street they stand on. Some listings include contributory fixtures such as surrounding walls or railings in front of the building. These are summarised by notes alongside the building name.

== Listed buildings ==
Contributory fixtures
Note	Listing includes
^{[A]}	Attached railings
^{[B]}	Attached walls
^{[C]}	Attached walls and gate
^{[D]}	Attached walls and railings
^{[E]}	Attached walls, piers and railings
^{[F]}	Attached piers and railings
^{[G]}	Attached schoolroom and forecourt wall

Building name	Area	Image	Notes	Refs
20, 21 and 21a East Street	The Lanes; 50.8207°N 0.1395°W		This street, which formed the old village of Brighthelmston's eastern boundary, may have 14th-century origins. The curved four-storey building occupying the corner of Bartholomews dates from the early 19th century. Above the modern shopfront in the ground floor, there are Doric pilasters and nine windows to each storey; most are either sashes or blocked panes, all straight-headed. At the top is an entablature, cornice and parapet.	
22, 22a, 23 and 23a East Street	The Lanes; 50.8209°N 0.1394°W		These three-storey houses, now in commercial use, stand on a corner site and are now in commercial use. A three-window range faces East Street; they are segmental bays with tripartite windows. The side elevation has two windows. The 19th-century shopfront has some ironwork and tracery to a Jacobean design.	
26 and 27 East Street	The Lanes; 50.8211°N 0.1393°W		The slate hipped roof has been renewed, but the building retains its late-18th-century appearance. It rises to three storeys and is stuccoed; it is double-fronted with three windows to both the west and the north façades. Some windows are blank, others have stained glass, all have architraves above and some also have modillion-style cornices. The ground-floor shop unit is modern.	
28 East Street^{[A]}	The Lanes; 50.8211°N 0.1394°W		This is a narrow, four-storey, late-18th-century house whose ground floor was converted into a shop in the 1830s. The building has been in commercial use since then, and an "ungainly" attic storey was added on top of the cornice in the late 19th century. The building is stuccoed and slate-roofed, and has one window on each floor. An original spiral staircase links the lowest three floors. A large balcony extends above the shopfront outside the first-floor window.	
29 East Street	The Lanes; 50.8212°N 0.1394°W		Forming part of English's Seafood restaurant along with its listed neighbours at numbers 30 and 31, this tall four-storey former house dates from the late 18th century but had a shop unit inserted during the 19th century. This is topped with an entablature and a cornice with dentil patterning. Above this, a segmental bay window rises through all three upper storeys to just below the roofline, where it terminates in an entablature. The roof itself forms a small pediment. The top-floor windows have 18th-century wooden louvres. The building is of brick with some mathematical tiles.	
30 East Street	The Lanes; 50.8212°N 0.1395°W		A tiled gambrel roof with a dormer window tops this two-storey cottage, now integrated into the English's seafood restaurant complex. It is contemporary with the surrounding buildings, but sits back from them. The shopfront is 19th-century and has Tuscan pilasters. Above this is a large sash window. The roof sits on top of a dentil-patterned cornice of brick.	
31 East Street	The Lanes; 50.8211°N 0.1395°W		Like its neighbour at number 30, this is a two-storey brick cottage with a gambrel roof, dormer window, ground-floor shopfront of 19th-century design and dentil cornice. Between the roofline and the shopfront is a canted sash bay window. The building is set back from the street, on the same line as number 30.	
35 East Street	The Lanes; 50.8214°N 0.1394°W		The most distinctive feature of this 18th-century three-storey building is its Italianate painted brick façade, added in the 19th century. The chimney-stack is also brick, and one side wall is of cobblestones, but the rest of the exterior is stuccoed. The hipped tiled roof can only be seen from the sides, as the façade rises above it. There are some 19th-century sash windows.	
36 East Street	The Lanes; 50.8215°N 0.1394°W		Now a restaurant, this 18th-century house occupies a significant place in Brighton's history as the former home of Martha Gunn, the most famous of the "dippers" (operators of the bathing machines used on the beach). The three-storey building has cobblestones, tarred bricks and flints. The Tuscan-columned entrance porch is reached by steps. Some windows have original sashes, while others are blind.	
1–9 Eastern Terrace^{[E]}	Kemptown; 50.8172°N 0.1188°W		Built on the seafront in 1826–1828 as a curiously L-shaped formal composition in which the end houses faced away from the sea, the houses in this terrace have mostly been divided into flats but retain many fine features: Rococo-style decoration, bow fronts, large staircases and (at number 2) high-quality French mahogany panelwork. The stucco and yellow brickwork exteriors have Classical-style porches.	
3 Eaton Gardens	Hove; 50.8313°N 0.1698°W		Eaton Gardens is part of the Willett Estate Conservation Area, designated in 1989. William Willett built an estate of fine, well-proportioned houses and villas in the 1880s. This yellow-brick example, now converted into flats, has a three-bay façade with canted bay windows, stone lintels and a hipped roof.	
8 Eaton Gardens^{[C]}	Hove; 50.8315°N 0.1690°W		English Heritage describes this as "one of the best [villas] on the Willett estate". It dates from about 1880 and is now subdivided into flats. Yellow gault bricks are the main building material, but decorative moulded brickwork in other colours—characteristic of Willett-built houses—is much in evidence. The two-storey three-bay façade has a single-storey billiard room attached.	
14 Eaton Gardens^{[B]}	Hove; 50.8324°N 0.1687°W		This has been extended and is now a nursing home, but the character of the original Willett building of the 1880s remains. Like numbers 3 and 8 Eaton Gardens, it has a three-bay façade, canted bay windows to all floors, an original door set back below a round-arched porch with rustication and with a fanlight above, and yellow brickwork with widespread use of moulded and incised brick and terracotta.	
Eaton House^{[D]}	Hove; 50.8303°N 0.1697°W		Now converted into offices but retaining most original external and internal features, this is another large Willett-built gault brick villa of the 1880s. It has three storeys, three bays with canted windows to the outer bays, decorative coloured glass panelling, a mosaic floor, original lincrusta-covered walls and plaster frieze decoration.	
1–19 Eaton Place^{[A]}	Kemptown; 50.8170°N 0.1168°W		Thomas Read Kemp's development of the Kemp Town overstretched his finances, and he conveyed a large area of land west of it to builder Thomas Cubitt in lieu of payment for his work. Cubitt built Eaton Place, a terrace running north from the seafront, on this land between 1846 and 1855. The houses on the west side have three storeys and an attic floor, bow fronts, cast iron balconies, sash windows and rusticated decoration.	
2–24 Eaton Place^{[A]}	Kemptown; 50.8172°N 0.1164°W		The east side of Eaton Place has a run of bow fronts and first-floor balconies stepping downhill towards the sea. All 12 houses are stuccoed, four-storey, three-window buildings with entablatures, cornices and parapets. Many original sash windows remain, and the ground floor of each house is rusticated.	
Egremont Gate^{[D]}	Queen's Park; 50.8236°N 0.1283°W		Queen's Park opened as Brighton Park in 1823 and was given two triumphal arch entrances in the late 19th century. Francis May's artificial stone Egremont Gate of 1890 was the more ornate of the two, with elaborate carved spandrels and panels, Tuscan-style piers, paired pediments topped with Byzantine-style finials and a moulded frieze.	
7–10 Egremont Place^{[A]}	Queen's Park; 50.8223°N 0.1295°W		These four terraced houses date from the second decade of the 19th century. Each has a one-window range, three storeys surmounted by a parapet, and stepped centred entrances with glazed fanlights above. The windows are bays, either segmental or (at number 10) canted. Numbers 8 and 10 have double-height Tuscan-style pilasters on their façades.	
39 Egremont Place^{[A]}	Queen's Park; 50.8228°N 0.1288°W		This three-storey mid-terrace house dates from about 1825. Points of interest include several keystones (to the door and windows) with vermiculated rustication (a random pattern of curved lines), a three-storey bay window to the left of the round-headed entrance, an arch-patterned iron balcony and a pair of blind windows above the entrance. The façade is stuccoed.	
41 and 42 Egremont Place^{[A]}	Queen's Park; 50.8227°N 0.1288°W		Number 41 is stuccoed, like many of its neighbours, but number 42 is built of dark reddish-purple brick with some mathematical tiles and contrasting brick lintels. Both terraced houses were built in about 1825 and have three storeys with a parapet at the top. The fanlights in the arched entrances are no longer glazed. Both houses also have iron balconies and blind windows above the entrances.	
44 Egremont Place	Queen's Park; 50.8226°N 0.1289°W		This mid-terrace house has many similarities to contemporary houses elsewhere on the street. Built in about 1825, it has three storeys with two windows to each (those on the second and third floors are blocked and flat-arched), a stepped arched entrance, and a segmental bay window rising through all three storeys. The house is brick-built, but the colour of the brick is obscured by paintwork.	
45–47 Egremont Place^{[A]}	Queen's Park; 50.8225°N 0.1289°W		Like their neighbour at number 44, these 1820s terraced houses are built of brick laid in the Flemish bond pattern. Exposed unpainted brickwork remains at number 46 only. Features common to all three houses include stepped entrances with round arches containing a blocked fanlight, three-storey bay windows to the left, and blank windows with brick lintels at first- and second-floor level above the door (except at number 45, whose second-floor window is glazed). Number 45 also has a first-floor balcony around the bay window.	
57–59 Egremont Place^{[A]}	Queen's Park; 50.8220°N 0.1293°W		At the southeast corner of the street, this three-house terrace has three-storey segmental bay windows with thin cast iron balconies around the first-floor window, right-oriented round-arched doorways, and flat-headed windows above the door (blank at numbers 57 and 58, but both glazed to number 59). Like most other houses nearby, they date from about 1825.	
Egyptian Campaign Memorial	Brighton; 50.8217°N 0.1368°W		Standing on Old Steine near the Brighton War Memorial, this simple pink granite obelisk dates from 1888 and commemorates soldiers from the Royal Sussex Regiment who died in the 1882 Anglo-Egyptian War and the Nile Expedition. The two-stage structure consists of a tapering granite obelisk on a square marble plinth with a pedimented cornice.	
Electricity Junction Box at St Ann's Well Gardens	Hove; 50.8291°N 0.1557°W		Following their purchase in 1908 of the formerly private pleasure garden at St Ann's Well, Hove Borough Council installed electric lighting. This junction box was manufactured around that time by the Worcester-based firm of Hardy and Padmore, one of the leading firms in the industry. It is of cast iron and has many decorative features.	
Entrance lodge at Brighton and Preston Cemetery^{[B]}	Race Hill; 50.8344°N 0.1202°W		Built in 1885 next to the cemetery's entrance archway, this vernacular "Old English"-style cottage has prominent gables on two sides, and another which extends almost to ground level as a catslide. The entrance is in a porch between the south- and east-facing elevations, set in a Tudor-style doorcase. There is much use of terracotta in the dressings, mouldings, corbels and other fixtures, and external timberwork is also prominent. The roof has an ornate chimney-stack.	
Entrance piers at Brangwyn Way	Patcham; 50.8583°N 0.1532°W		The Brangwyn estate was developed in the mid-1930s west of London Road at Patcham, east of the contemporary Westdene estate. Its entrance from London Road is flanked by two concrete and brick piers (north pier pictured) with wrought ironwork at the top in the form of electric lamps. The plinths are octagonal with four projections; the piers themselves are square in plan. There are very small brick walls around the bases.	
Entrance to St Nicholas' Church Graveyard	Brighton; 50.8256°N 0.1460°W		The graveyard at St Nicholas' Church was full by 1841 despite an extension to the north, so in that year Amon Henry Wilds laid out a further extension west of Dyke Road. The Classical-style arched entrance dates from 1846, and is of stone and yellow brick. The arch itself is brick-built with a keystone and flanking Doric-style pilasters of stone. A stone entablature and cornice sit above this.	
Esplanade Cottages	Kemp Town; 50.8149°N 0.1107°W		Borough Surveyor H.E. Kendall, who also built St Patrick's Church in Hove, spent 12 years from 1828 laying out the undercliff esplanade at Kemp Town. The design, in the Classical style to harmonise with the surrounding architecture, included two cottages built into the cliff. The two-storey stuccoed buildings, with rusticated chimneys and a four-window range with a Tuscan pilaster between each, were built for the Kemp Town Enclosures gardener and the estate's constable.	
Exton House^{[D]}	Hove; 50.8255°N 0.1676°W		Characterised by a three-bay façade with one bow front and a canted bay flanking a recessed central section—an uncommon arrangement—this three-storey house (now flats) of 1876–77 is otherwise typical of the expansively decorated yellow-brick villas and houses of the James Knowles-designed, William Willett-built Stanford estate. There are dormer windows in the attic, which sits above a cornice with dentil ornamentation.	
Fence, piers and gate at Brighton College playing fields	Queen's Park; 50.8230°N 0.1206°W		Thomas Graham Jackson, who was responsible for much of Brighton College, also designed these structures surrounding the nearby sports fields. He erected them in 1886–87; some damage has occurred over the years, especially at the north end. The railings are of Birmingham iron, and the walls combine stone, brick and flintwork. The southernmost gate piers also have stone obelisks.	
Finsbury Road Board School (former)	Hanover; 50.8281°N 0.1269°W		Thomas Simpson's Arts and Crafts-style board school of 1881 was bought by Brighton Polytechnic (now the University of Brighton) after it fell out of use. It was then converted into flats called Hanover Lofts in 2003. The walls are brown brick augmented with red brick and concrete dressings. The slate roof is topped with a metal-domed painted timber cupola. It is one of "a distinguished group of board schools" designed by Simpson and his son Gilbert in Brighton and Hove.	
41 First Avenue	Hove; 50.8268°N 0.1659°W		This building and its neighbours are one of a pair of mews on either side of First Avenue, facing Church Road. They date from 1879, although changes were made in the 20th century. Yellow brickwork, some of which is moulded, predominates; the hipped roof is laid with slate and has bracketed eaves and panelled chimneys. The façade to First Avenue originally had three bays, but only the southernmost survives: a shopfront replaced the others.	
Ford Mausoleum at Brighton Extramural Cemetery^{[A]}	Race Hill; 50.8365°N 0.1192°W		Designed in the Gothic style to resemble a columbarium, the mausoleum of Gerard Ford was erected in 1889. It is mostly of stone, with iron railings and some pink granite columns flanking recessed arched panels on the north and south faces. The stone roof is steep and gabled, with decorative mouldings. A gabled porch incorporates the arched entrance.	
Frankland Monument	Stanmer; 50.8667°N 0.1025°W		Frederick Meinhardt Frankland MP, who died in 1768, is commemorated by this Coade stone statue of 1775 by Richard Hayward. It was erected at the expense of Thomas Pelham, 1st Earl of Chichester, who owned Stanmer House and the estate, and his wife Ann, who was Frankland's daughter. The plinth has three stone tortoises and a Latin inscription. The triangular column above has concave sides with oval panels and a cornice with a frieze and some egg-and-dart moulding, all topped by an urn. The monument stands on top of a hill in Stanmer Park.	
Freemasons Tavern	Brunswick Town; 50.8257°N 0.1598°W		This mid-19th-century Classical-style inn was transformed in 1928 by John Leopold Denman of Denman & Son in a spectacular and elaborate style "reminiscent of the Viennese Secession". A blue and gold mosaic framed entrance with Masonic symbols and gold chimerae leads to a two-storey bronze and glass screen doorway. Art Deco fixtures from the 1920s, including built-in furniture and plaster friezes, remain inside.	
French Convalescent Home (former)^{[D]}	Black Rock; 50.8151°N 0.1074°W		The French government paid for this seafront rest home, on the cliffs east of Kemp Town, for use by patients from the French Hospital in London. Local firm Clayton & Black designed and built the French Renaissance Revival home in 1895–96, and it was used for the next 100 years before being sold for conversion into flats. Pevsner found the château-style Belgian brick building "dreary".	
12 Gardner Street	North Laine; 50.8249°N 0.1397°W		This was the original Swan Downer School for disadvantaged children, which later moved to purpose-built premises at 11 Dyke Road. Later uses included a pub and a ground-floor shop unit, installed in the 20th century. There are two residential floors above this, each with three brick-arched sash windows. One of the windows is blank.	
Gate piers and gate at Stanmer Church	Stanmer; 50.8701°N 0.1021°W		These structures at the entrance to the churchyard were apparently provided when Stanmer Church was rebuilt in 1838. The gate piers are of flint and stone, and are topped by worn pyramid-shaped headers. There is decorative brattishing on the cast iron gate.	
Gate piers and walls at Sillwood Place	Brighton; 50.8235°N 0.1532°W		The walls and gates at the south end of Sillwood Place, also Grade II-listed, are "included for group value". They flank the road entrance, and are low and about 9 metres (30 ft) long. The four gate piers are stuccoed, like the rest of the structure, and have cornices. There is stucco panelling on the walls as well.	
Gate piers at Park Crescent	Round Hill; 50.8318°N 0.1320°W		The Great Storm of 1987 severely damaged these structures and the adjacent walls, which were the only surviving part of James Ireland's 1820s pleasure garden. A lion and lioness, both of stone, were destroyed and replaced with replicas. The piers are of stucco with Classical-style decoration and mouldings.	
Gate piers, lamp standards and walls at Bristol Gate	Kemptown; 50.8186°N 0.1161°W		Two gate piers flank Bristol Gate, a road leading off the main Eastern Road in Kemptown. The mid-19th-century structures are very worn and in disrepair, but they retain their stone blocks and entablatures linked by Tuscan-style pilasters. There is also some brickwork and a pair of iron lamp-holders.	
Gates and walls at Jewish Cemetery	Round Hill; 50.8389°N 0.1327°W		Along with the cemetery chapel (also Grade II-listed), these structures were added to the 1820s cemetery in the 1890s and were funded partly by charging worshippers at Middle Street Synagogue. The gates have decorative patterns in wrought iron, and the octagonal gate piers each have four pediments.	
Gazebo at Hillside	Rottingdean; 50.8071°N 0.0602°W		After a road was built from Rottingdean to Falmer, this structure (in the garden of Hillside, a Grade II*-listed house of 1724) was apparently built as a watchtower to see approaching coaches. It dates from the early 1820s, has a single straight-headed window in each of its four sides and is topped by a pyramidal cap-style roof.	
1–8 George Street	Carlton Hill; 50.8212°N 0.1349°W		Now in various commercial uses, the buildings in this terrace were constructed as houses in the late 18th century. All are faced with mathematical tiles, and tiled gambrel roofs and cornices are standard (except at number 1, which has a slate roof with eaves). Each building has a single-window range, mostly with canted bays.	
26 Gloucester Place^{[A]}	Brighton; 50.8267°N 0.1357°W		A mid-19th-century façade hides a slightly older structure at this three-storey terraced house. At second-floor level there is a quatrefoil-decorated balcony of cast iron with a canopy above the window. The two-window range includes a full-height canted bay. Pilasters flank the arched doorway. The roof, which has chimneys, is behind a parapet.	
82 Gloucester Road	North Laine; 50.8273°N 0.1408°W		Occupying a corner site with an elevation to Over Street, this is a small 19th-century shop with living accommodation on two floors above. The ground-floor shop unit is chamfered on the street corner, and the panelled entrance is in this section. The door and windows are original. Bay windows face Gloucester Street at first- and second-floor level, while the Over Street side has flat windows including two blanks. There is also a hipped roof.	
83 Gloucester Road	North Laine; 50.8272°N 0.1406°W		Opposite number 82 on the other side of Over Street, and contemporary with it, this office was a pub for some time; elaborate late-19th-century decoration is still visible. An ogee-headed canopy with a dentil cornice sits above the corner entrance. The windows flanking it share this cornice and have decorative brackets. Other decorative elements include egg-and-dart, sunburst and Oriental themes, griffin carvings, moulded cartouches and curved pediments.	
Gossip in the Steine Café	Brighton; 50.8210°N 0.1376°W		Originally a tram-stop shelter, then converted into public toilets, this Streamline Moderne/International-style structure has been a café since the late 20th century. It dates from 1926 and was designed by David Edwards. The end walls curve round and have entrances, and the flat roof overhangs to give shelter.	
Gothic House^{[B]}	Brighton; 50.8246°N 0.1522°W		Now in commercial use and retaining a shopfront of 1920 by Henry Ward, this "fanciful and irresponsibly Gothick" building was designed by Amon Henry Wilds and Charles Busby in 1822–25 (although Wilds alone may have been primarily responsible). It has a range of pinnacled buttresses and a multi-sided tower with lancet windows, and is stuccoed. The building first became a shop in 1898, and later (as a Debenhams department store) took in several surrounding properties.	
2–4 Grafton Street	Kemptown; 50.8196°N 0.1287°W		These three three-storey houses are part of a terrace built on the East Cliff in the early 19th century. The slate and tile roofs have chimneys between them. The mostly flat-arched windows—two per floor on number 2, and a single-window range on the others—are set in semicircular bays which reach through all three storeys. Cast iron balconies survive at numbers 3 and 4.	
6 and 7 Grafton Street	Kemptown; 50.8194°N 0.1288°W		Contemporary with the nearby terrace at numbers 2–4, these linked houses rise to three and four storeys respectively and have two-window ranges. The entrances are set in Tuscan-columned doorcases with foliage carvings on the friezes of the entablatures. Number 6 has an attic-level cornice and rustication to the ground floor, but its semicircular bay frontage is only two storeys high; number 7 has a four-storey canted bay.	
12 Grafton Street	Kemptown; 50.8192°N 0.1288°W		Now joined to 62 Marine Parade and converted into flats, this four-storey house was built in the early 19th century and is distinguished by its ground-floor windows. The deep ogee heads were apparently inspired by the contemporary redevelopment of the nearby Royal Pavilion in an opulent Indo-Saracenic Revival style. Other windows in the four-storey semicircular bay frontage are sashes.	
14 Grafton Street	Kemptown; 50.8193°N 0.1291°W		This early-19th-century terraced house has an unconfirmed attribution to Sir Charles Barry. It is partly stuccoed and partly of brick, and has a parapet in front of its slate roof. The five-window range is split into two parts: the northern half of the house has three storeys, each with three windows, and a balcony at first-floor level, while the southern half spans four storeys with two windows to each. Rusticated pilasters terminate at a bracketed cornice and mark the transition between the two parts. Three ground-floor windows are arched and form a small arcade. The left-oriented, Tuscan-columned entrance has vermiculated blocks in its surrounding structures.	
4 Grand Avenue	Hove; 50.8261°N 0.1681°W		Grand Avenue was first planned in the 1870s, but development was slow and from the 1930s large blocks of mansion flats were built at the south end instead of the intended houses. The most interesting is considered to be this block, designed by the Murrell & Piggott firm in the Moderne style between 1935 and 1936. Steel-framed Crittall windows are set into the brown-brick walls, which also have curved balconies and a series of recesses and projections. Just below the top (ninth) floor, a stuccoed balcony joins the two projecting wings. Building started in 1938.	
6 Grand Avenue^{[F]}	Hove; 50.8263°N 0.1681°W		Development of Grand Avenue and its four flanking avenues, as part of the West Brighton Estate of the 1870s, "adopted the heavy monumentality of the later Victorian period". One such example is this house (now in multiple occupancy) of three storeys and three bays with a 3:1:3 window layout. It was designed by E.J. Ockenden in about 1880. The walls are of yellow brick, and there is much decorative moulding, especially around the windows and entrance porch (which has garlanded capitals and spandrels).	
8 Grand Avenue	Hove; 50.8266°N 0.1679°W		Amos Faulkner, an architect employed by William Willett, had worked with Ernest Newton on developments in Chislehurst. He adopted Newton's "Old English"/"Surrey" Vernacular style for a group of four houses on Grand Avenue. Number 8 was built in 1900–03 with red brick and extensive use of tiles on the walls and the steep hipped roof. There are prominent gables, mullioned and transomed windows and large brick chimneys.	
9 Grand Avenue	Hove; 50.8268°N 0.1678°W		Similar to its neighbour at number 8, number 9 Grand Avenue is distinguished by a wide, tile-hung bow window rising through two storeys to a dentil cornice, and a "most attractive porch" in the early-18th-century style with a decorative canopy. It is L-shaped, and both bays have gable ends. The entrance is in the inside right-angle.	
10 Grand Avenue	Hove; 50.8270°N 0.1680°W		This house also has a well-designed porch: in this case, Ionic columns support a flat arch and a cornice with egg-and-dart moulding. Several grouped chimneys of red brick rise from various points on the steep tiled roof. Parts of the first floor have tile-hanging; the rest of the building is of red brick. The L-shaped house has gable ends and windows with mullions and transoms.	
11 Grand Avenue	Hove; 50.8270°N 0.1683°W		On a corner site and consequently double-fronted, this Amos Faulkner-designed house is contemporary with its neighbours. Its three sets of angled diamond chimneys are a distinctive and prominent feature. The three-bay west-facing façade has the entrance and an irregular series of windows with mullions and transoms. There are bay windows on the south-facing side. The style of this and the other Faulkner houses has also been called Queen Anne Revival.	
Grand Hotel	Brighton; 50.8216°N 0.1473°W		John Whichcord Jr. designed the "earliest and best" of Brighton's Victorian seafront hotels. Its eight-storey bulk towered above the surroundings upon completion in 1862, and Building News called it "vulgar" and self-important. The style is Italianate/French Second Empire, and exterior features include corner towers and bronze balconies. Inside, some original public rooms and a delicate cast iron staircase survive. Yawetz Associates' rebuilding in 1986, after the 1984 bombing, was sympathetic.	
9 and 10 Grand Parade^{[A]}	Brighton; 50.8266°N 0.1345°W		A series of early 19th-century terraced houses survive on the east side of Grand Parade. This pair may have been designed by Wilds and Busby in about 1815 and have black mathematical tiles and brick quoins. Both are of three storeys and have tall segmental bay windows. The mansard roof has dormer windows and is set behind a parapet.	
12 and 13 Grand Parade^{[A]}	Brighton; 50.8264°N 0.1346°W		Like their neighbours at numbers 9 and 10, these terraced houses of the mid-1810s are laid with black glazed mathematical tiles and have painted brickwork to the quoins. They are some of the oldest houses on Grand Parade, and form part of a "delightful collection" of varied architecture. The straight-arched entrance porches have moulded architraves. Some original sash windows survive in both buildings, and number 13 has a covered balcony which is apparently not original.	
14 Grand Parade^{[A]}	Brighton; 50.8264°N 0.1347°W		Amon Henry Wilds and Charles Busby probably designed this building in about 1825. It has three stucco-clad storeys with a single window to each; no original glazing survives. The entrance is set under an arch and has an architrave and fanlight. The windows are set in a semicircular bay which rises through all three floors. There is a slate mansard roof with a dormer window.	
17 Grand Parade^{[A]}	Brighton; 50.8264°N 0.1346°W		Rising to four storeys and dating from about 1815, this mid-terrace stuccoed house shares characteristic features with its neighbours: bow windows with three lights, a cast iron balcony and a panelled door in a doorcase topped by a cornice. "An attractive Georgian reinterpretation of Classical motifs" is achieved here and elsewhere on Grand Parade.	
18 and 19 Grand Parade^{[A]}	Brighton; 50.8262°N 0.1348°W		Attributed to Amon Henry Wilds and Charles Busby and dating from the mid-1820s, these two houses are distinguished by enormous Doric pilasters forming an arcade above a doorcase in a similar style (fluted Doric columns with a Greek-style moulded entablature). The four-storey stuccoed buildings have rustication at ground-floor level. The windows are set into large segmental bays. Cast iron balconies span the façade at first-floor level.	
20–22 Grand Parade^{[A]}	Brighton; 50.8261°N 0.1348°W		These three four-storey houses of the early 19th century are partly spanned by a parapet which hides their tiled roofs (number 22 has a cornice instead). Each building has a full-height bay, but their styles vary: segmental and wide at number 20, canted and narrower at number 21, and a combination of both at number 22. Each has a first-floor balcony; that at number 22 also has a concave canopy.	
23 Grand Parade^{[A]}	Brighton; 50.8260°N 0.1349°W		The exterior of this three-storey house of the 1820s is painted brick. A single dormer window rises from the tiled roof, and there is one three-light window to each storey—all set into a full-height segmental-arched bay. The 19th-century panelled door is set beneath an arched doorcase.	
26 and 27 Grand Parade^{[A]}	Brighton; 50.8258°N 0.1350°W		These houses stand on a corner site next to Morley Street, which leads to the inner suburb of Carlton Hill. Number 26 is taller (at four storeys) and stuccoed, while number 27 has three storeys and a dormer window in its slate roof and has painted brick and stuccoed walls. Rustication is visible at ground-floor level. Both houses have full-height segmental bays and arched doorways with pilasters.	
30 Grand Parade	Brighton; 50.8256°N 0.1352°W		Now in commercial use and with 20th-century shopfront and dormer window additions, this was originally a house at the start of the 19th century. The façade is of tarred cobblestones with some painted brickwork, and has two windows to each of the two floors above the shopfront, which has a stepped entrance.	
31–35 Grand Parade^{[A]}	Brighton; 50.8256°N 0.1352°W		This five-house terrace dates from the early 19th century. The ground floors are stuccoed and, except at number 33 (which has two further stucco-clad storeys), there are two storeys of tarred cobbled walls above. The windows have painted brick surrounds. Number 33 also has a 19th-century shopfront; on the other houses, rustication decorates the ground-floor walls. The houses have segmental bay façades.	
37 Grand Parade	Brighton; 50.8253°N 0.1353°W		Another early-19th-century terraced house which has entered commercial use, this three-storey building has dormer windows in its roof (partly obscured by a parapet) and bay windows at first-floor level. There are original sash windows with elaborate friezes above.	
38 Grand Parade	Brighton; 50.8252°N 0.1353°W		The ground floor of this four-storey early-19th-century house was altered in the late 20th century in connection with a hotel development, but most other original detail survives—including two-storey bay windows with mullions, pilasters above this, an entablature and parts of a dentil-pattern cornice, and a slate-tiled mansard roof with dormer windows. The walls are of brick and stucco.	
40 Grand Parade^{[A]}	Brighton; 50.8251°N 0.1354°W		Rising to three storeys with one window on each, this stuccoed, slate-roofed terraced house has decorative features such as ground-floor rustication, a pilaster-flanked round-arched entrance with a fanlight and cornice above, a cast iron balcony at first-floor level and a string course above. The slate mansard roof has dormer windows.	
41 Grand Parade^{[A]}	Brighton; 50.8251°N 0.1353°W		Many features of this house are similar to number 40 Grand Parade, with which it is contemporary. Steps lead to a right-oriented round-arched entrance with a fanlight with decorative tracery, surrounded by pilasters and a cornice. A segmental bay rises through all four storeys and has a single tripartite window to each floor. A cast iron balcony spans the bay at first-floor level.	
46 Grand Parade^{[A]}	Brighton; 50.8249°N 0.1354°W		This three-storey house has a painted stucco exterior, a stuccoed chimney and a slate roof. A full-height polygonal canted bay with one multi-light window on each storey terminates at the roofline. A cast iron balcony at first-floor level has a separate canopy above. The stepped entrance is set in an arched recess below a fanlight.	
47 Grand Parade	Brighton; 50.8248°N 0.1354°W		Brighton Proprietary Grammar and Commercial School, ancestor of the present Brighton Hove & Sussex Sixth Form College, had its first home at this building, which (as Lancaster House) was refurbished and converted into offices in 1989–90. It is later than its neighbours, dating from about 1840, and is Italianate in style. Charles Barry apparently designed the wide, four-storey, four-window building, called "the grandest house" in Grand Parade. Pale yellow brickwork and stucco with vermiculated decoration make up the façade.	
68 Grand Parade^{[A]}	Brighton; 50.8237°N 0.1358°W		This building, dating from about 1800, houses the University of Brighton's School of Architecture and Design; when the university was Brighton Polytechnic, the Lewis Cohen Urban Studies Centre was based here. Mathematical tiles are common in local buildings of this era, but the red-glazed examples on the four-storey façade are rare. There is some red brickwork as well. The doorway has Doric columns, an entablature and pediment. Most windows in the full-height semicircular bay are original sashes. Some black mathematical tiles are visible below the parapet as well.	
69 Grand Parade	Brighton; 50.8236°N 0.1358°W		This part of Grand Parade dates from the 1790s and 1800s and was once called Town Parade. Number 69 was built of red brick, stucco and slate in about 1800. There are three windows to each of the four storeys. At ground-floor level, there is rusticated stucco and an arched entrance with a glazed fanlight. To its left, a semicircular bay rises through all four storeys. The windows are three-light sashes. A cast iron balcony sits below a convex canopy.	
70 Grand Parade^{[A]}	Brighton; 50.8236°N 0.1359°W		The exterior of this early-19th-century house is painted brick and stucco. The slate mansard roof has two dormers, and there are two flat-arched windows to each of the four storeys. There is rustication at ground-floor level, including around the corniced entrance with its semicircular glazed fanlight. The eight windows are set into a segmental bay which is spanned at first-floor level by a curved cast iron balcony.	
71 Grand Parade^{[A]}	Brighton; 50.8235°N 0.1359°W		Built at the same time and to the same height as its neighbour at number 70, this stuccoed building differs in the treatment of its entrance and the divisions between storeys. The doorway is ornately Classical, with a round arch, pilasters and an architrave with an incised keystone set into it. Some of the flat-headed windows also have keystones and architraves. The storeys have projecting bands of stucco between them, and there is a cornice below the mansard roof. There is also a first-floor cast iron balcony.	
72 Grand Parade^{[A]}	Brighton; 50.8234°N 0.1359°W		Built of brick in about 1800, this house rises to four storeys and has paired dormers in its slate roof. A semicircular full-height bay has two windows to each storey, and a curved cast iron balcony spans the first floor. The entrance porch has a quadrant arch to match that of number 73, with whose entrance it is paired; the ground floor is also stuccoed. The windows (two on each storey) are straight-headed.	
73 Grand Parade^{[A]}	Brighton; 50.8234°N 0.1360°W		Contemporary with its neighbours on the former Town Parade, the appearance of this house was changed significantly by a mid-19th-century refronting and the renewal of all windows. It is now stuccoed and rusticated at ground-floor level. The curved cast iron balcony above is particularly ornately patterned. The left-oriented entrance has a quadrant-head arch and retains its original door. The two first-floor windows within the segmental bay have architraves, small cornices and moulded paterae (decorative circular projections) above them.	
Gratwicke House^{[A]}	Kemptown; 50.8192°N 0.1291°W		Number 13 Grafton Street, also called Gratwicke House, is of early-19th-century vintage and rises to four storeys. The entrance retains some original detail, including its fanlight and a keystone in the form of a smiling old man with a beard. The doorway is framed by an entablature and supporting Tuscan columns. A two-storey, two-window segmental bay rises to the right and has iron railings at the top. The original balcony at first-floor level does not survive, but corbels which previously supported it are visible.	
11–13 Greenways and The Granary	Ovingdean; 50.8162°N 0.00767°W		Although added to on several occasions in the 20th century, these four structures have early-19th-century origins. The first three have always been cottages, while The Granary (a taller, weatherboarded building) was once a garage as well as a granary. Flint, brick and slate (to the roofs) are the main building materials. Number 13's roof is hipped.	
Groyne opposite East Street	Brighton; 50.8189°N 0.1392°W		Since its construction in about 1880, this structure on the beach has been used as a coal delivery point and a promenade as well as protecting against erosion. It is a stone-paved flint pier with some 20th-century repairs.	
Groyne west of Palace Pier	Brighton; 50.8188°N 0.1370°W		Like the nearby groyne opposite the end of East Street, this flint and stone structure dates from the 1880s and was used to accept seaborne coal deliveries and as a walkway for Victorian promenaders.	
8–28 Hampton Place^{[A]}	Montpelier; 50.8255°N 0.1503°W		The "emaciated giant pilasters", as Pevsner called them, of this sloping terrace are the most distinctive feature: each house has a fluted pair. The houses are early-19th-century designs by William Hallett, grander outside than in. They rise to three storeys and have a single window to each floor; the ground-floor window is recessed into a stuccoed panel and surrounded by rustication. There is a continuous cast iron balcony at first-floor level.	
11 and 13 Hampton Place^{[A]}	Montpelier; 50.8252°N 0.1507°W		These date from about 1825 and have a single-window range, although the houses are two and three storeys high respectively. Both have roofs hidden behind parapets. The doorcases are flanked by pilasters. Number 13 retains sash windows in its full-height segmental-arched bay front.	
15 Hampton Place^{[A]}	Montpelier; 50.8253°N 0.1507°W		Contemporary with its neighbours at numbers 11 and 13, this two-storey, single-window mid-terrace cottage has a stepped entrance leading to a doorway set beneath an architrave and between pilasters. The segmental-arched full-height bay has sash windows and terminates below a cornice and parapet with a panelled pattern.	
19 and 21 Hampton Place^{[A]}	Montpelier; 50.8253°N 0.1506°W		These three-storey mid-terrace houses date from the mid-1820s. Both have stepped entrances and doorways with architraves, pilasters and panelled wood doors. Segmental-arched bays with one window to each floor rise through two storeys; a straight-headed architraved window lights the top floor.	
25 Hampton Place^{[A]}	Montpelier; 50.8254°N 0.1506°W		At this mid-1820s cottage, the main difference from its neighbours is the capping of the segmental bay front with a small dome-shaped projection. The top-floor window of the three-storey building has an architrave and is set below a cornice.	
29–37 Hampton Place^{[A]}	Montpelier; 50.8256°N 0.1505°W		Each house in this terrace has three storeys with a single window to each. The entrances, reached by steps, each have pilasters and architraves and are lit by a fanlight, like those at the other houses in Hampton Place. All except number 37 have a stuccoed dome at the top of their two-storey segmental bay fronts, similar to that at number 25.	
32 and 34 Hampton Place^{[A]}	Montpelier; 50.8257°N 0.1502°W		These end-of-terrace buildings stand on the corner of Upper North Street, and number 34 has a double-fronted shop unit at ground-floor level and three windows (some now blank) facing that street. On both houses, a single window set in a bay front faces Hampton Place. Number 32 has a cast-iron first-floor balcony. Some windows are original sashes.	
39 Hampton Place^{[A]}	Montpelier; 50.8258°N 0.1505°W		This early-19th-century end-of-terrace house has a three-bay façade with two bay windows flanking a round-arched entrance. The ground floor is rusticated; this pattern terminates at a rounded architrave. Original sash windows survive at first-floor level. There are blank windows facing north into Montpelier Terrace.	
1 and 2 Hampton Terrace^{[D]}	Montpelier; 50.8258°N 0.1499°W		Part of a terrace, these houses were built by the mid-19th century and have decorative cast-iron balconies and canopies in front of their canted bay windows. There are two windows to each of the two storeys. The roof is set behind a cornice and parapet.	
Hanningtons Department Store (former)	Brighton; 50.8217°N 0.1391°W		Henry Jarvis's original design of 1866 for Brighton's longest established department store was added to by acquisitions of neighbouring shops in the 20th century and extensions (including a hexagonal tower) by John Leopold Denman. It closed in 2001. The 4-storey building has a curved, stuccoed Gothic Revival façade with complex windows.	
Hanover Chapel (former)	Brighton; 50.8258°N 0.1420°W		Thomas Cooper's "remarkably original version of the standard chapel theme" was built in 1824 for Independent Christians. It was acquired by Presbyterians and used until the 1980s, when a new church was built on the side of it. Two ground-floor Venetian-style windows are in fact blind arches flanked with columns.	
1–24 Hanover Crescent^{[A]}	Hanover; 50.8307°N 0.1307°W		Amon and Amon Henry Wilds built this development between 1814 and 1823: it was one of their earliest projects in Brighton. It is a mixed arrangement, mostly with three linked villas with taller three-bay central houses. A private garden separates the crescent from Lewes Road.	
Hanover Crescent: North Lodge	Hanover; 50.8314°N 0.1303°W		This one-storey structure is Classical in style: its façade is given a temple-style layout with flanking columns of the Doric order, set distyle in antis.	
Hanover Crescent: South Lodge	Hanover; 50.8305°N 0.1317°W		Similar to the other lodge, and built in about 1822, this stucco-faced structure has distyle in antis Doric columns supporting a pediment and paired pilasters around the side windows.	
23–30 High Street	Carlton Hill; 50.8219°N 0.1323°W		This terrace was some of the first council housing provided by Brighton Council. They commissioned local architecture firm Clayton & Black to design them in 1909; building took place in 1910. The "small but highly attractive" Arts and Crafts-style two-storey cottages are built on a slope and have half-timbering and prominent window mullions. The houses are of roughcast-coated red brick and have tiled gambrel roofs and leaded porches.	
33 High Street	Rottingdean; 50.8039°N 0.0577°W		Known historically as Arlington Cottage, this mid-terrace building stands on the west side of Rottingdean High Street. It has a cobblestone and flint façade and painted brick quoins and window surrounds. The two-window range is offset to the left, and the arched entrance is to the right. The windows on the ground floor have similar flat and segmental arches. Original sash windows survive. The tiled roof has a large central chimney.	
39 High Street	Rottingdean; 50.8039°N 0.0579°W		This 18th-century detached house, set well back from the street, is now a café. It may originally have been two houses, according to evidence visible in the masonry of the flint and painted brick façade. The two-storey building has two windows to each floor, of which all but one are sashes. The hipped tiled roof supports a stucco-clad chimney.	
41 High Street	Rottingdean; 50.8040°N 0.0579°W		This double-gabled former detached house is now a branch of Barclays. The late-19th-century building was extended to the rear and re-roofed in the 20th century. The walls are of flint with brick dressings, and one gable is half-timbered. The ground-floor window next to the entrance is a canted bay. The other windows have either segmental or pointed arches.	
43–49 High Street	Rottingdean; 50.8043°N 0.0579°W		This 19th-century terrace is now in mixed residential and commercial use: numbers 43 and 45 had ground-floor shop units inserted in the 20th century. Each building is cobblestone-fronted with some red brickwork and a slate roof. Numbers 47 and 49 retain doorways and ground-floor windows with segmental arches. The first-floor windows are all straight-headed. Number 49's roof is separate from the single roof that spans the other three buildings.	
44–50 High Street	Portslade; 50.8431°N 0.2198°W		These 18th-century cottages are at the heart of the old part of Portslade village. The walls are of flint laid in courses, and there are brick quoins and patterning to the steep gabled return to South Street. The window surrounds are also of brick. An extension, apparently also from the 18th century, joins the terrace to the taller neighbouring house. Most doors and windows are modern replacements.	
57–63 High Street	Portslade; 50.8434°N 0.2193°W		This four-house terrace may have originally been a single building in the 18th century. The façade is rendered but a flint side wall (with a single window below the gable) is visible. The four-bay façade has a sash window to each bay on both storeys. Some windows and doors were altered in the 19th and 20th centuries. Number 57 retains an old fire insurance plaque.	
62 High Street	Rottingdean; 50.8038°N 0.0575°W		Originally called Tallboy Cottage and dating from the 18th century, this low two-storey building has a prominent bay window to the right of the two entrances, a tiled partly hipped roof and plaster-covered brick walls with a single chimney.	
65 and 67 High Street	Portslade; 50.8435°N 0.2191°W		Originally a single house and perhaps 16th-century, this was converted into two houses in the 20th century, when new windows and doors were added. Flint rubble and brick are the main building materials. The tile roof is partly hipped.	
66 High Street	Rottingdean; 50.8039°N 0.0575°W		This is attached to its neighbour at number 66 and was originally listed in a joint listing with it. The three-storey house has a date plaque showing 1780. Its cobbled façade has painted brick quoins and dressings and sits below a tiled roof, and it has a single-window range. The ground- and first-floor windows are set in a bay. The house's former name is The Old Cottage.	
83 High Street	Rottingdean; 50.8054°N 0.0585°W		This single-storey 18th-century house, once called Hampton Cottage, may have been two cottages originally. There is a central straight-headed entrance under a porch and another entrance to the right. The three-window range is complemented by three dormers in the tiled roof. The walls are covered with plaster.	
87 High Street	Rottingdean; 50.8055°N 0.0586°W		Built in the 19th century and once called Ivy Cottage, this two-storey house has a single-window range and a right-oriented entrance under a porch. The walls are mostly of flint with some brickwork. A single chimney stands on the tiled roof. The sash windows are set in segmental-headed surrounds.	
116 High Street	Rottingdean; 50.8054°N 0.0583°W		This end-of-terrace house, once called Stanley Cottage, is on a corner site on Vicarage Lane and adjoins a similar building thereon. The flint and painted brick two-storey building is 18th-century. Its left-oriented entrance is set in a doorcase formed by Doric columns and an entablature. There is a small window above this and a two-storey bay window to the right. A single window faces Vicarage Lane.	
75 Holland Road	Hove; 50.8276°N 0.1613°W		Now luxury flats called Palmeira Yard, Thomas Lainson's distinctive French Second Empire/Queen Anne-style red-brick and terracotta building of 1893 was originally a furniture repository provided for the local cooperative organisation. It has a steep slate mansard roof, ornate gables, extensive use of wrought iron and decorative terracotta mullions and transoms. The symmetrical nine-bay façade is partly recessed.	
Holland Road Baptist Church^{[G]}	Hove; 50.8271°N 0.1614°W		John Wills, who also designed Hove Methodist Church, provided Hove's Baptist community with a landmark place of worship in 1887. The pale Purbeck stone Transitional Gothic building has a prominent four-stage tower with a Rhenish-style pointed cap. The steep roofs are of slate. Structural and interior alterations were carried out in 1997. A three-sided wooden gallery is supported on iron Corinthian columns; above it is a hammerbeam roof.	
Holy Trinity Church (former)	The Lanes; 50.8228°N 0.1420°W		The core of this redundant church dates from 1817, but its external appearance is based on Clarke and Micklethwaite's 1885–87 overhaul, which changed the originally Classical-style preaching house into a Perpendicular/Decorated Gothic Revival landmark. Its knapped flint and stone façade (facing east) contrasts with the stucco surviving on the south-facing side wall. Thomas Read Kemp founded the chapel for a short-lived Nonconformist sect he led; after he returned to the Church of England, the building was reconsecrated for that denomination. It closed in 1984 and became the Fabrica art gallery.	
Holy Trinity Church (former)	Hove; 50.8312°N 0.1719°W		Hove grew rapidly in the mid-19th century, and church provision initially lagged behind. This church was founded in April 1863 in an attempt to improve capacity. James Woodman's original design was augmented by a central tower in 1866, and a rare open-air pulpit was added in 1912. More structural additions were made in the 1940s and 1950s, although a closure threat came as early as the 1920s. Falling attendances prompted a declaration of redundancy in 2008, and the empty church—described as one of Britain's ten most threatened Victorian and Edwardian structures—has been threatened with demolition. Red brick with stone, yellow brick and black brickwork dominates the Gothic Revival exterior.	
Holy Trinity Church: churchyard walls	Hove; 50.8314°N 0.1718°W		The walls are contemporary with the church tower: they were erected in 1866 and made taller about 15 years later ("to prevent so much rubbish being thrown over", according to church administrative documents). They are of flint, laid in courses with brick dressings and vertical piers and some cement work.	
Holy Trinity Greek Orthodox Church	Carlton Hill; 50.8240°N 0.1314°W		Carlton Hill, developed early in the 19th century with dense housing, was provided with an Anglican church in 1838 when George Cheesman junior designed a severe Classical/Greek Revival building with a stuccoed façade covering brick, a recessed entrance flanked by two wings and a large pediment. Originally dedicated to St John the Evangelist, it was renamed Holy Trinity after being sold to the Greek Orthodox community in 1985. Arson caused severe damage in 2010.	
Home Farm House	Withdean; 50.8533°N 0.1547°W		This former farm cottage of the early 19th century survives near the main London Road. It is a tiled-roof flint and brick two-storey building with tall chimney-stacks at each gable end. There are red- and grey-brick quoins and dressings around the windows, which have segmental heads. There have been later extensions.	
Home Farmhouse	Stanmer; 50.8707°N 0.1024°W		Part of the Stanmer Estate, this building dates from the 18th century but has been extended and changed several times, particularly by the addition of a gabled north wing with a two-storey canted bay window. The original section is a four-bay flint and brick wing hung with tiles on the rear elevation.	
Hove Club^{[D]}	Hove; 50.8275°N 0.1716°W		Samuel Denman designed this gentlemen's club in 1897. It is a Neo-Jacobean free-style red-brick building with prominent gables, which also features buttresses rising to form chimneys, a loggia entrance, stone mullions and transoms, Art Nouveau-style windows and ornate interior timberwork. Internal alterations took place in the 20th century, including the insertion of a casino in 1978, but much plasterwork and timber has been retained and the original iron staircase survives.	
Hove Methodist Church	Hove; 50.8328°N 0.1792°W		Hove's Methodists met in houses from 1808 until 1883, when they bought land north of Portland Road and erected a tin tabernacle. This served until 1892; John Wills was commissioned to design a permanent replacement in 1895. His Romanesque Revival red-brick and stone building has some Gothic Revival elements, a large rose window, pinnacles, a hammerbeam roof and columned gallery. It opened in 1896 and was given a distinctive new entrance porch and staircase in 1992.	
Hove Public Library	Hove; 50.8284°N 0.1772°W		The Edwardian Baroque design by Percy Robinson and W. Alban Jones for Hove's new library has been called "highly inventive". Executed between 1907 and 1908, it has an ashlar façade with two groups of three round windows flanking a round-arched pedimented entrance. Egg-and-dart and garland moulding, capitals in the form of cherubim and a carved tympanum complement the "spatially interesting" interior.	
Hove Railway Station and footbridge	Hove; 50.8351°N 0.1711°W		This was called Cliftonville from its opening in 1865 until 1895. F.D. Bannister, the LBSCR's architect who also designed most of the Cliftonville estate, may have been involved in the design. The Classical-style present building and its attached footbridge date from 1879 to 1880. Red brick and stone are the main materials, and the hipped roof is of slate. An elaborate porte-cochère with fluted iron columns spans part of the forecourt. Inside, a queen post roof survives.	
Hove War Memorial	Hove; 50.8268°N 0.1687°W		Standing in the middle of Grand Avenue, and also known as the St George's Memorial, Edwin Lutyens' "restrained and dignified" columnar structure of 1921 serves as a northern counterpoint to the statue of Queen Victoria at the south end of that road. The granite Tuscan column stands on a simple pedestal and supports a bronze figure of Saint George, somewhat in the style of Donatello.	
HSBC Bank, North Street	Brighton; 50.8232°N 0.1407°W		North Street gained several large commercial buildings in the early 20th century, notably a series of "grand banks". Thomas Bostock Whinney designed this Midland (now HSBC) Bank branch in about 1902 in a sober Edwardian/Italianate style with some Classical elements such as a Tuscan-columned colonnade and a bracketed entablature over the entrance, which is in a chamfered corner and set below an escutcheon-decorated panel. A five-window range faces North Street; the Bond Street return has four. At first-floor level, the windows are set below pedimented architraves.	
HSBC Bank, Western Road	Brighton; 50.8244°N 0.1502°W		Also by Thomas Bostock Whinney, and dating from 1904, this former Midland Bank branch (now HSBC) is a Bath Stone building in the Classical style. Its three-bay façade hides a single-storey interior which has been altered from its original design. Rustication covers the façade, apart from the pair of Doric columns flanking the entrance. Doric-style antae flank the outer windows. The entrance has a frieze and a semicircular pediment whose tympanum has garlanded decoration. A balustrade runs along the top of the building.	

== See also ==
- Buildings and architecture of Brighton and Hove
- Grade I listed buildings in Brighton and Hove
- Grade II* listed buildings in Brighton and Hove
- List of conservation areas in Brighton and Hove
