= Holy Trinity Church, Hove =

Holy Trinity Church
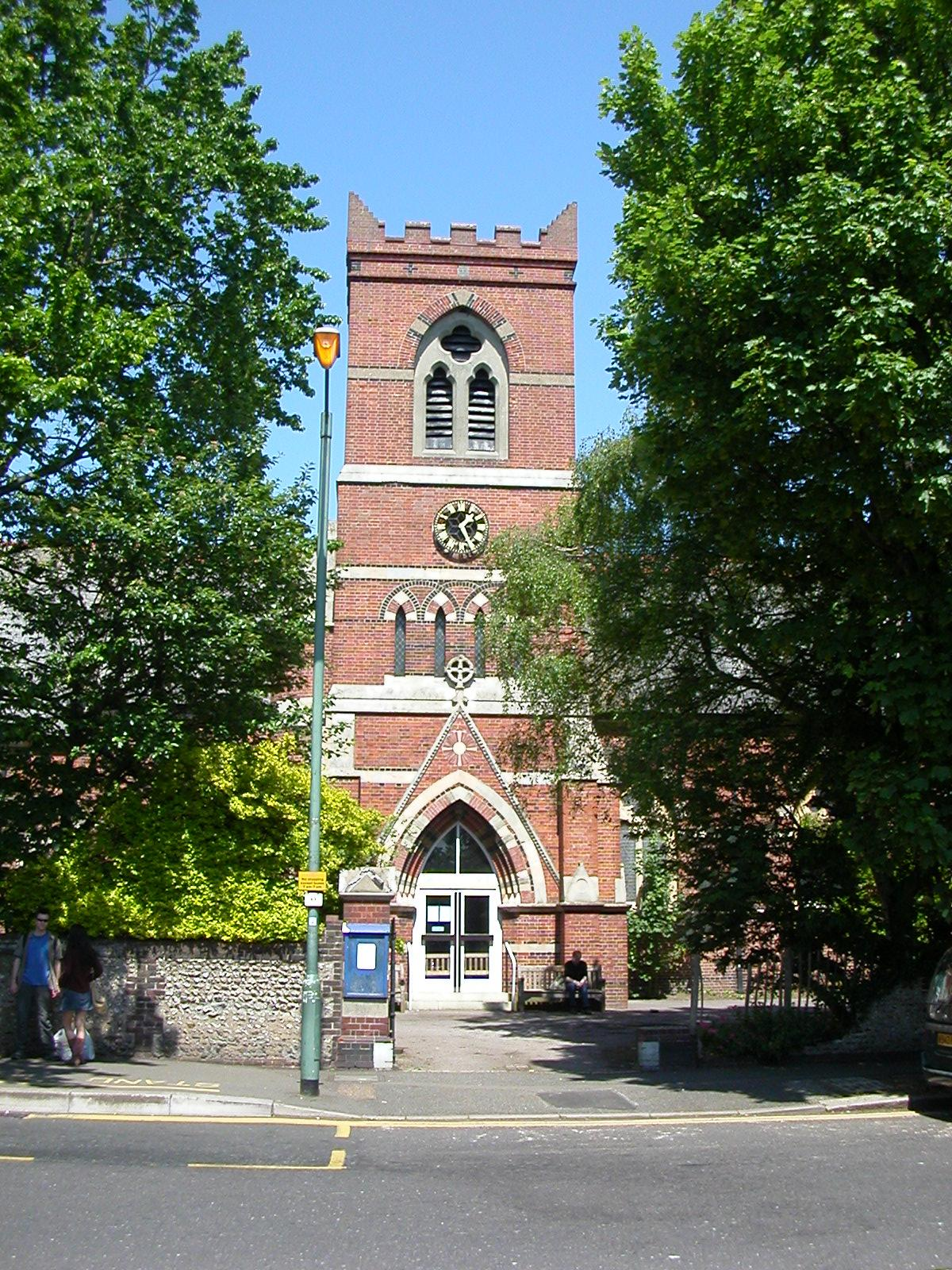
- The south face and tower
- Holy Trinity Church
- 50.8312°N 0.1719°W
- Location: Blatchington Road, Hove, Brighton and Hove
- Country: England
- Denomination: Anglican
- Churchmanship: Evangelical

History
- Status: Church
- Founded: 1861
- Founder: Rev. John Fraser Taylor
- Dedication: Holy Trinity
- Consecrated: 15 June 1864

Architecture
- Functional status: Redundant; threatened with demolition
- Heritage designation: Grade II-listed
- Designated: 2 November 1992
- Architect: James Woodman
- Groundbreaking: 1862
- Completed: 1864
- Construction cost: £9,000 (£988,700 in 2025)
- Closed: 2007

Holy Trinity Church is a former Anglican church in Hove, in the English city of Brighton and Hove. Built in the early 1860s to provide extra capacity for Anglican worshippers in the rapidly growing town of Hove, its use declined in the 20th century and it was closed in 2007 following a Diocesan review. Until 2015—when a planning application to convert the building into a doctors surgery was approved—its future was uncertain, and a heritage group has described it as one of Britain's top ten threatened Victorian and Edwardian buildings. The church, which has been a medical centre since 2017, has Grade II listed status, reflecting its architectural and historic importance.

== History ==
Hove expanded rapidly in the second half of the 19th century, and the Cliftonville estate—developed from 1852—was one of its earliest areas of growth. It was situated directly east of the old centre of Hove village on high-quality agricultural land which had been used to grow food for the nearby Brunswick estate. The land was bought by four businessmen from Brighton and was developed with nearly 300 houses, in various architectural styles, in the next nine years.

St Andrew's, the old parish church of Hove, was close to the newly developed streets, but its capacity was often reached at services. Rev. John Fraser Taylor, a curate at St Andrew's, started planning a new church in 1861; a site was found and bought for £250 (equivalent to £25,700 in 2025) on Eaton Road (now Blatchington Road). James Woodman, a local architect, was responsible for the design, and a builder named Cane constructed it. This took 14 months and cost a further £9,000 (£988,700 in 2025). The Bishop of Chichester, Ashurst Gilbert—who laid the foundation stone on 7 April 1863—consecrated the church on 15 June 1864. At that time, it consisted of chancel, nave, side chapels and a south aisle; its tall tower on the south side was added in 1866. A spire was never added, although one had been planned. In 1868, an aisle was built on the north side at a cost of £1,200 (£117,300 in 2025).

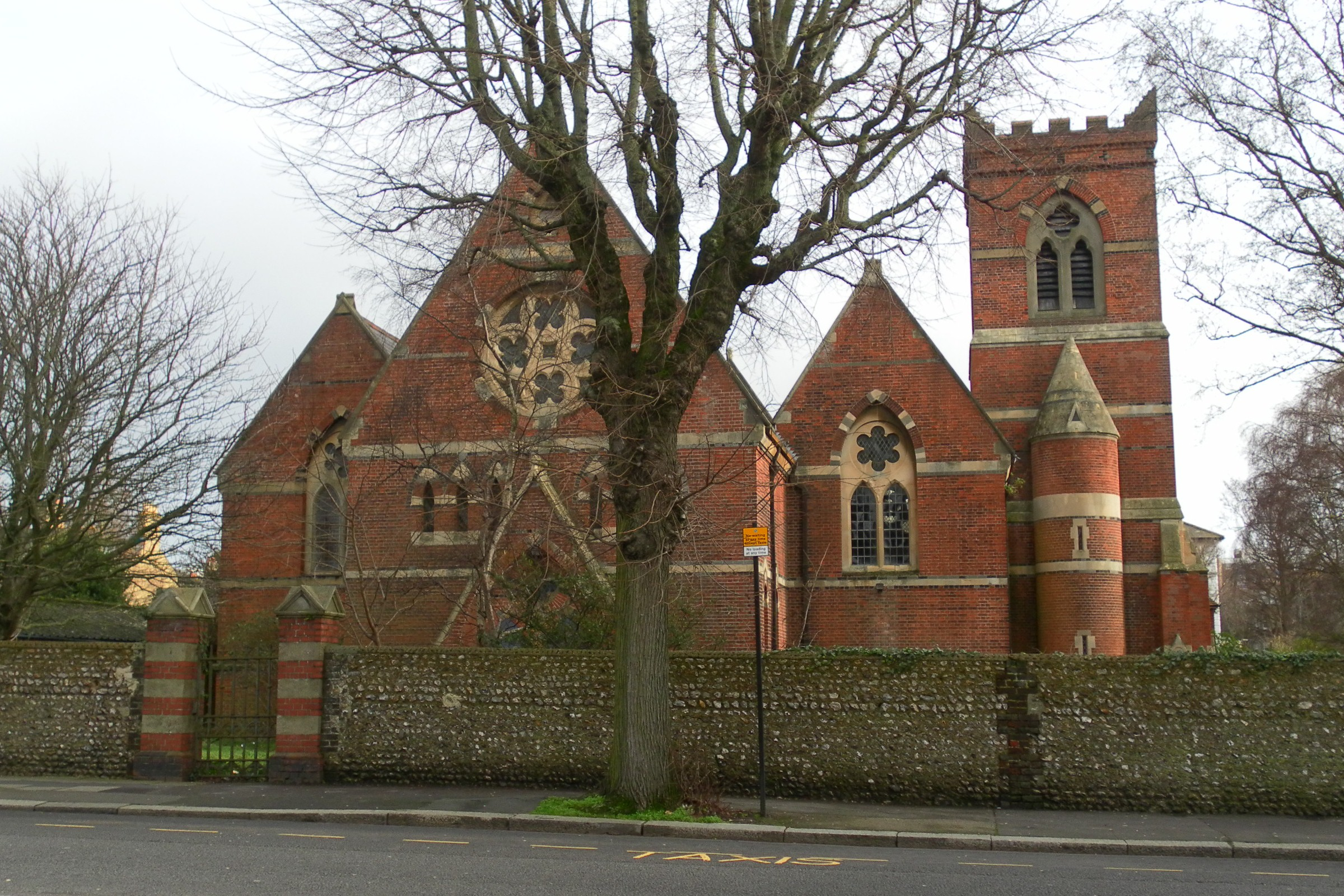
The west end of the church

In 1912, the church was given an open-air pulpit. This rare feature, usually associated with churches with an evangelical tradition, was unique in Brighton and Hove. Later additions included rooms under the wooden gallery in 1949, a vicarage in 1952 and a church hall in 1953.

At first, Holy Trinity Church operated as a chapel of ease to St Andrew's Church. After All Saints Church was built in 1892 and gained the status of parish church, Holy Trinity became part of its parish. This arrangement continued after the church was threatened with closure in the 1920s because of falling attendances, although it was allocated its own district.

The Diocese of Chichester carried out a review of Anglican churches in the city of Brighton and Hove between 2002 and 2003. Its report, published in June 2003, recommended that Holy Trinity Church should close. It was said to have "no future" within the proposed Central Hove Collaborative Ministry, whose area would incorporate six places of worship in Hove. It was stated that the nearby Holy Cross church offered a similar type and tradition of worship, and no other church communities in the city were found to be suitable for church planting (i.e. moving one congregation and community wholesale into another building). The Diocese of Chichester declared the church redundant on 1 September 2008, meaning it was no longer open for regular public worship.

== Architecture ==
The church is built mostly in red brick with stone dressings and some black and yellow brickwork. Its architectural style is difficult to specify; cases have been made for "Lombardo-Gothic", Italian Gothic, standard Gothic, Early English and Eclectic. The design has been criticised as "ignorant beyond belief", echoing architect and architecture lecturer Harry Stuart Goodhart-Rendel's comments about another Hove church, St John the Baptist's, in 1918.

Holy Trinity Church has a nave of four bays, aisles on each side, chancel, apse, gallery at the west end with two rooms below, organ chamber on the northeast side (containing an organ originally installed in 1883 and later converted to electric operation), vestry at the southeast corner and entrance porch on the south side, above which the battlemented tower rises in three stages. (The porch is incorporated into the base of the tower.) The font was made in 1878 and consists of Caen stone and marble from Sicily. The interior is plain. Some of the windows contain stained glass; one commemorates Rev. John Fraser Taylor's parents, and he has his own memorial tablet in the chancel.

== The church today ==
In March 2009, the church was threatened with demolition and a housing development was proposed for the site. Local residents, including actor Brian Capron, have campaigned against this. The diocesan review in 2003 proposed using the building as second-stage accommodation for homeless people who had lived in the St Patrick's Church homeless shelter. Brighton and Hove City Council has also considered using the land for a new primary school. In 2008, The Victorian Society, an architectural study and preservation group and national charity, identified the church as one of Britain's ten most threatened Victorian and Edwardian structures. In March 2011, Brighton and Hove NHS Trust announced that it was considering combining two local doctors' practices and moving them from their existing premises in central Hove into the former church. If local people approved and planning permission had been granted, the Trust would have created a "spacious, fully accessible medical centre on three floors within the shell" of the church. A completion date of the end of 2012 was suggested. This scheme was abandoned, but in January 2015 a revised planning application was submitted. This proposal again involves the conversion of the church into a three-storey medical centre housing two general practices, but it also includes a single-storey extension to accommodate a pharmacy. Brighton and Hove City Council approved the planning application in July 2015. Specialist building development company Medical Centre Developments bought the building in February 2016 and planned to start converting it the following month. Trinity Medical Centre, formed as a result of two general practices in central Hove merging, was inaugurated at the former church in 2017. A three-floor, 1,300-square-metre (14,000 sq ft) suite of surgeries has been created in the church interior. There is also a newly built onsite pharmacy.

The church was listed at Grade II by English Heritage on 2 November 1992. It is one of 1,124 Grade II-listed buildings and structures, and 1,218 listed buildings of all grades, in the city of Brighton and Hove.

== See also ==
- Grade II listed buildings in Brighton and Hove: E–H
- List of places of worship in Brighton and Hove

== Bibliography ==
- Dale, Antony (1989). Brighton Churches. London: Routledge. ISBN 0-415-00863-8.
- Elleray, D. Robert (2004). Sussex Places of Worship. Worthing: Optimus Books. ISBN 0-9533132-7-1.
- Middleton, Judy (1979). A History of Hove. Chichester: Phillimore & Co. ISBN 0-85033-325-3.
- Middleton, Judy (2002). The Encyclopaedia of Hove & Portslade. Brighton: Brighton & Hove Libraries.
- Nairn, Ian; Pevsner, Nikolaus (1965). The Buildings of England: Sussex. Harmondsworth: Penguin Books. ISBN 0-14-071028-0.
- Scott, Eddie (1995). Hove: A Pictorial History. Chichester: Phillimore & Co. ISBN 0-85033-981-2.
