= Borrowash Methodist Church =

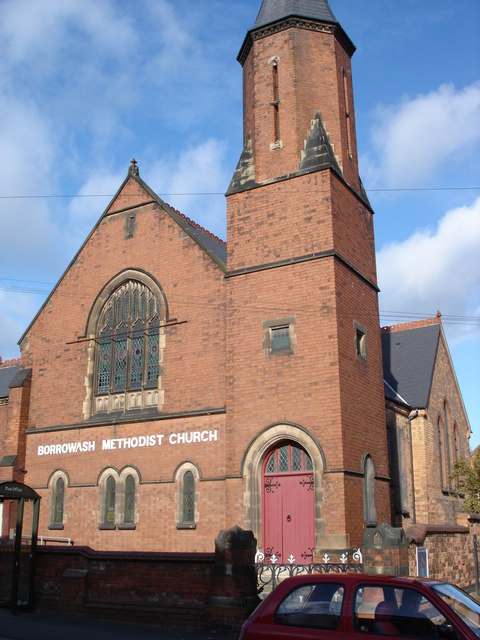
- Borrowash Methodist Church
- Borrowash Methodist Church
- 52.906493°N 1.37965°W
- Country: England
- Denomination: Wesleyan Methodist
- Website: borrowashmethodistchurch.com

Architecture
- Architect: John Wills
- Completed: 1900
- Construction cost: £2,250

Borrowash Methodist Church is in Borrowash. Derbyshire, England.

== History ==
The church was built by the contractor Henry Vernon of Derby, to designs by John Wills, who in the same year built an almost identical chapel in Beeston - (see Queen's Road Methodist Church). The church was opened on 30 May 1900.

The building was designed for 415 people and cost around £2,250 (equivalent to £239,107 in 2025).

== Organ ==
The church has a pipe organ by J.H. Adkins of Derby from 1920. A specification of the organ can be found on the National Pipe Organ Register.
