= Hove Methodist Church =

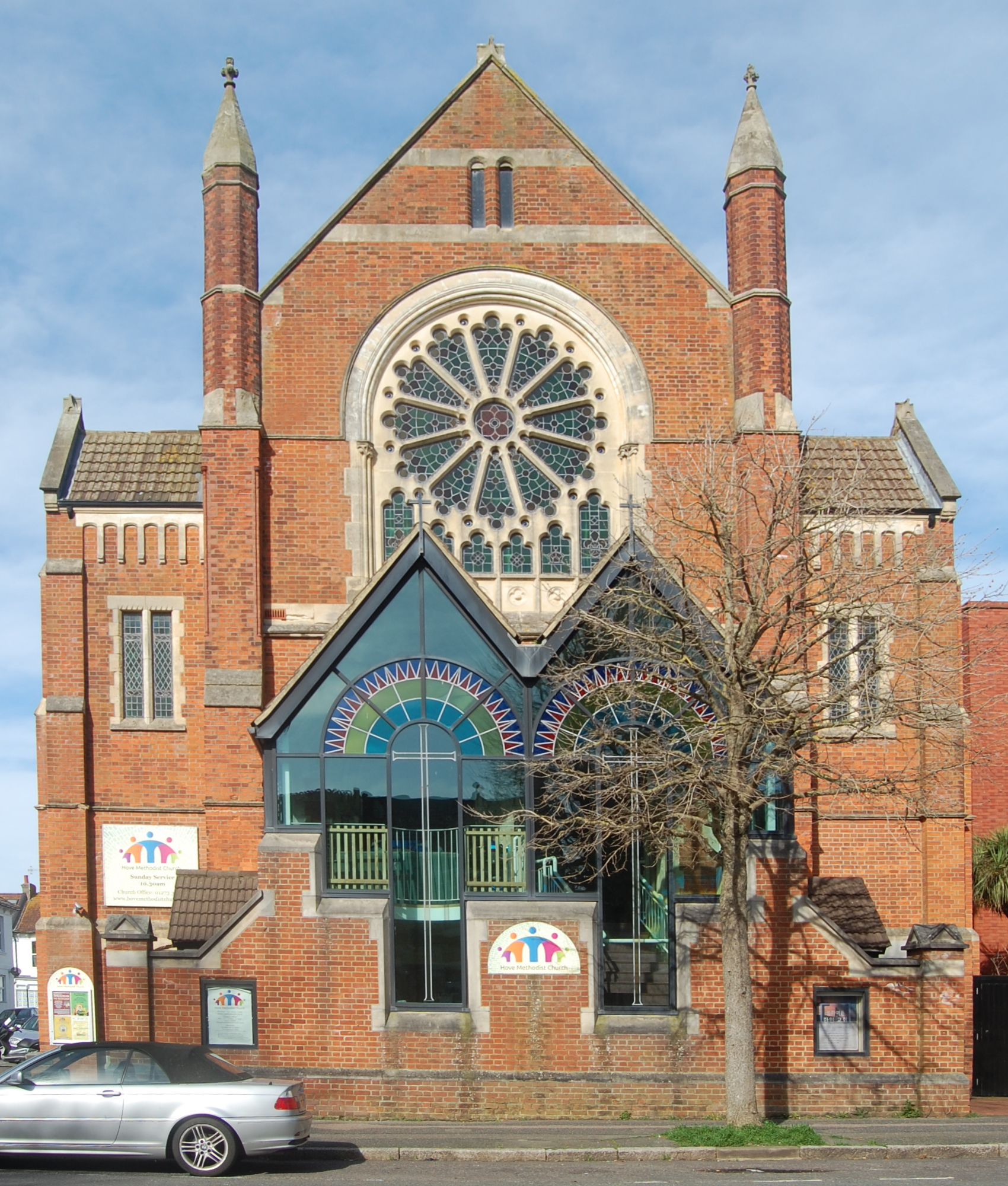
- The front of the church viewed from the south
- Hove Methodist Church
- 50.8328°N 0.1792°W
- OS grid reference: TQ 28322 05280
- Location: Portland Road, Hove, Brighton and Hove BN3 5DR
- Country: England
- Denomination: Methodist Church of Great Britain; Wesleyan Methodist (historically)
- Website: www.hovemethodistchurch.co.uk/

History
- Former name(s): Wesleyan Church, Portland Road Methodist Church
- Status: Church
- Founded: June 3, 1896
- Consecrated: 17 December 1896

Architecture
- Functional status: Active
- Heritage designation: Grade II listed
- Designated: 2 November 1992
- Architect: John Wills
- Style: Romanesque Revival
- Completed: 1896
- Construction cost: £4,700 (£540,000 in 2025)

Specifications
- Capacity: 600
- Materials: Red brick, stone

Administration
- District: South East England

Hove Methodist Church is one of five extant Methodist churches in the city of Brighton and Hove, England. Founded on a site on Portland Road, one of Hove's main roads, in the late 19th century by a long-established Wesleyan community, it was extended in the 1960s and is now a focus for various social activities as well as worship. The red-brick building has been listed at Grade II by English Heritage in view of its architectural importance.

== History ==
Hove was added to the Methodist circuit covering the neighbouring town of Brighton and the county town of Lewes in 1808, and by the next year 13 members were recorded as living in Hove. After several decades of meeting in houses and other buildings, the growing community decided to found their own church in the 1880s. After one proposed site had to be abandoned because of a lack of money, in 1883 they bought a plot of land on the north side of Portland Road—a main east–west route running from Hove through Aldrington to Portslade. The site cost £400 (equivalent to £42,100 in 2025). A second-hand temporary building made of iron was erected, but it had to be taken down in 1892; the congregation, who were Wesleyans, had to share another Methodist church in Hove with its Primitive Methodist community until they were able to build a permanent structure.

Architect John Wills was commissioned to design a new church in 1895. Eight years earlier he had designed the Holland Road Baptist Church, also in Hove. His plans were approved in 1896, and the church was founded on 3 June of that year by a group of 20 members, each of whom laid a stone in the floor or below the windows. The official opening date was 17 December 1896. The £4,700 cost of construction was paid off within ten years.

Girls' Brigade and Boys' Brigade companies were formed early in the church's history, and from the 1930s the church bought several adjacent buildings to provide more room for social activities. An extension, running north along St Patrick's Road, was opened at a cost of £25,000 in 1965. The church itself was altered externally in 1992, when the distinctive former double staircase leading to the entrance was demolished and a two-storey tower of multicoloured glass was added on the Portland Road façade. A new organ was bought in 1932 to replace a second-hand model from St Michael's Church, Brighton.

The church has had nearly thirty ministers during its existence, some of whom achieved importance beyond the local area. Robert Bond, the first minister, served from 1896 until 1899 and later served on the Free Church Federation, having become influential in the wider Methodist community. Ernest Kirtlan, known for his distinctive preaching style during his four-year incumbency from 1908—his loud voice sometimes sent Communion cruets falling from the altar to the floor—was also an expert on medieval English literature.

The church is licensed for worship in accordance with the Places of Worship Registration Act 1855 and has the registration number 35785.

== Architecture ==
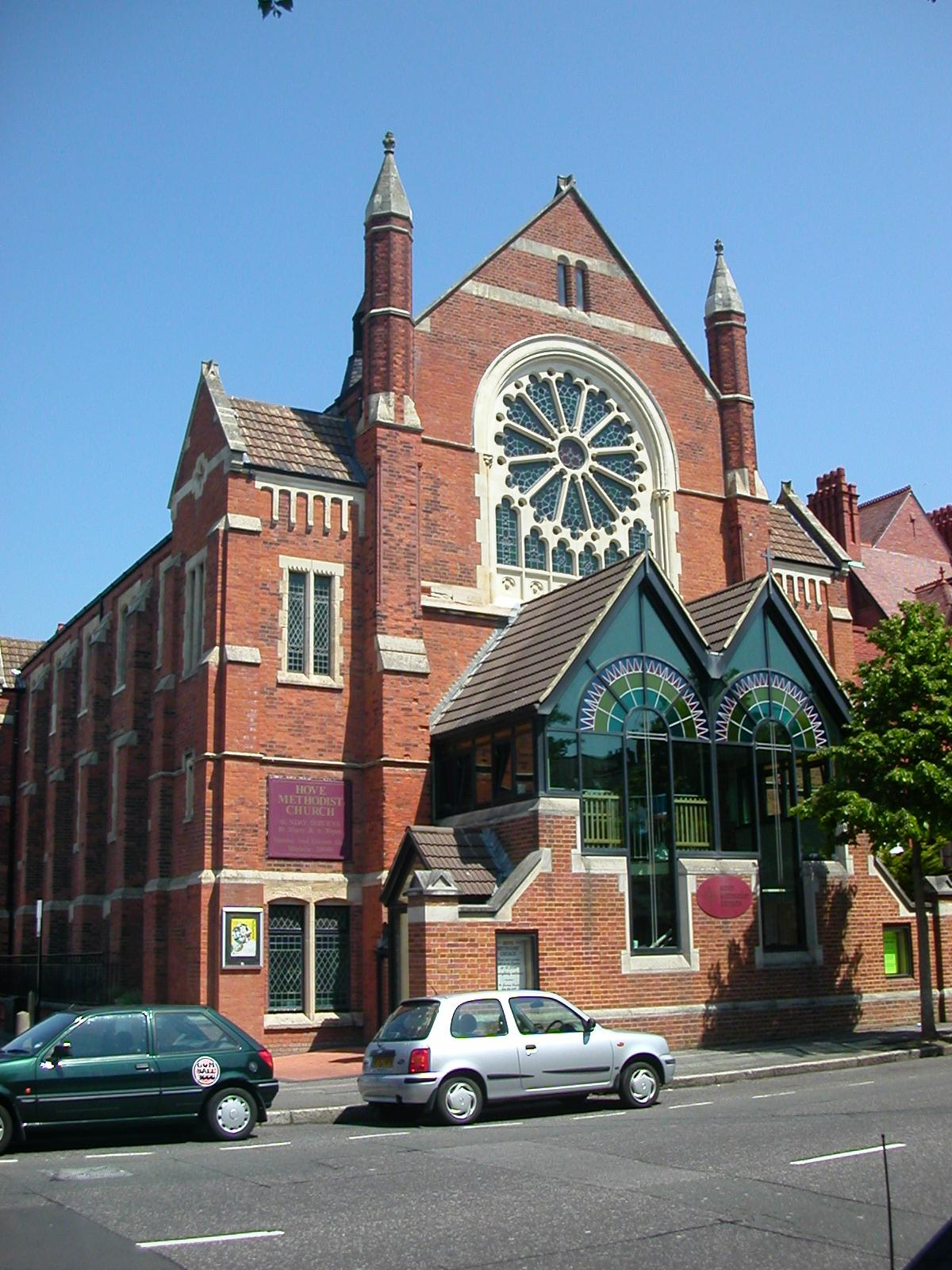
Church front (pictured in 2007)

John Wills designed the church in the Romanesque Revival style with Gothic elements. He used local bricks, made at the Keymer Brick and Tile Works in Burgess Hill, for the exterior; the expanses of red brick are combined with pale stone quarried in Wiltshire. Above the new glass entrance tower, arranged over two storeys, is a large rose window with twelve spokes, above a group of six lancet windows surrounded by stonework. The roof is laid with concrete tiles. Internally, the church is a simple rectangle with wooden galleries on three sides, reached by gable-headed staircases with pairs of windows alongside. Below the hammerbeam roof, the gallery is held up by cast iron columns. A ground-floor room below the main body of the church was originally a schoolroom.

== The church today ==
Hove Methodist Church was listed at Grade II by English Heritage on 2 November 1992. It is one of 1,124 Grade II-listed buildings and structures, and 1,218 listed buildings of all grades, in the city of Brighton and Hove.

The church is part of the Brighton and Hove Circuit of Methodist churches, which includes the city's five other churches: one in Patcham, one in Stanford Avenue near Preston Park, one in Hollingbury, one in Woodingdean and the Dorset Gardens Methodist Church in Kemptown. It is the only remaining place of worship for Methodists in Hove: former churches at Old Shoreham Road, Goldstone Villas and Portslade have closed. In the early 20th century, under its former name of Portland Road Methodist Church, it was in a six-church Wesleyan-following circuit with the Portslade and Kemptown churches, the former church in Bristol Road, Kemptown (now closed) and others in nearby Hurstpierpoint and Southwick.

There are two services on most Sundays, a monthly breakfast meeting and regular prayer services. Other social activities, Bible study groups and services take place during the week.

== See also ==
- Grade II listed buildings in Brighton and Hove: E–H
- List of places of worship in Brighton and Hove

== Bibliography ==
- Elleray, D. Robert (2004). Sussex Places of Worship. Worthing: Optimus Books. ISBN 0-9533132-7-1.
- Middleton, Judy (2002). The Encyclopaedia of Hove & Portslade. Brighton: Brighton & Hove Libraries.
