= Holland Road Baptist Church =

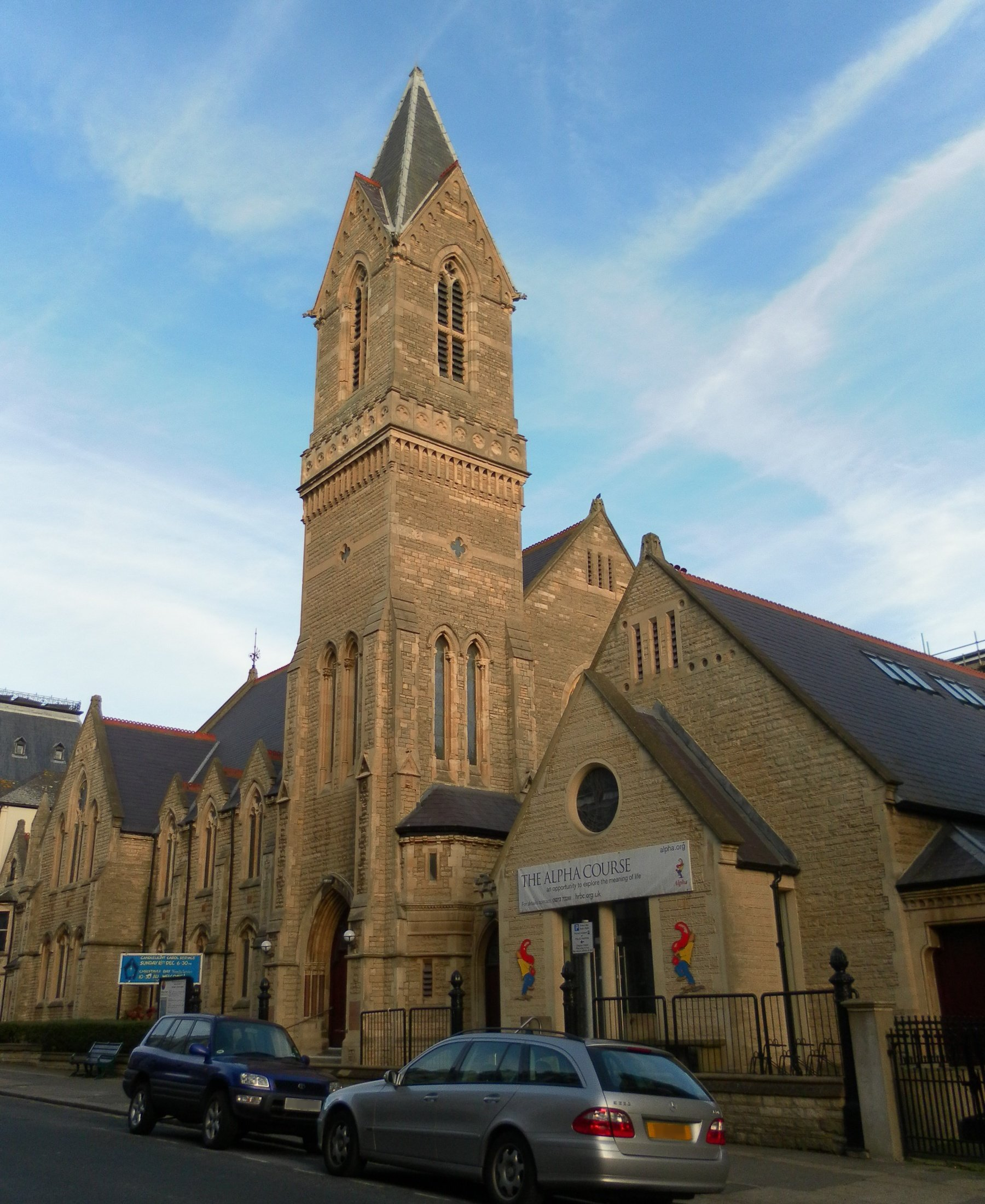
- The church from the southwest
- Holland Road Baptist Church
- 50.8271°N 0.1614°W
- Location: 71 Holland Road, Hove, Brighton and Hove BN3 1JN
- Country: England
- Denomination: Baptist
- Website: www.hrbc.org.uk/

History
- Status: Church
- Founded: 1882
- Founder: George Congreve

Architecture
- Functional status: Active
- Heritage designation: Grade II listed
- Designated: 26 February 1991
- Architect: John Wills
- Style: Transitional Gothic Revival
- Groundbreaking: 1887
- Completed: 29 July 1887

Specifications
- Capacity: 790
- Materials: Purbeck Stone

Administration
- District: South Eastern Baptist Association

Clergy
- Pastor: David Treneer

Holland Road Baptist Church is a Baptist church in Hove, part of the English city of Brighton and Hove. Built in 1887 to replace a temporary building on the same site, which had in turn superseded the congregation's previous meeting place in a nearby gymnasium, it expanded to take in nearby buildings and is a landmark on Holland Road, a main north–south route in Hove. It is one of ten extant Baptist church buildings in the city, and is the only one to have been listed by English Heritage in view of its architectural importance.

== History ==
The Wick estate was a large area of land north of the ancient village of Hove. Sir Isaac Lyon Goldsmid, part of the Goldsmid banking dynasty, bought most of the land for development in 1830. The estate was 250 acres (100 ha) in size and consisted of farmland, pastures and woodland, all centred on Wick Farm. Its boundaries were the parish of Brighton, the road along the seafront, the Stanford estate (a similar landholding, owned by Sir William Stanford) and Dyke Road at the boundary of the parish of Preston. The Wick estate was first described in print in 1247, and it passed through many owners in the next six centuries; Anthony Stapley, one of the regicides of King Charles I, held it for nearly 50 years. In 1830, Thomas Scutt and Thomas Read Kemp owned the land, and a portion on the south side was used to build the Brunswick estate. They sold the remaining 216.2 acres (87.5 ha) to Goldsmid for £55,525 (£5,483,400 as of 2025).

Holland Road was named after Henry Vassall-Fox, 3rd Baron Holland (Lord Holland), a Whig statesman and friend of Isaac Lyon Goldsmid. It was one of the first roads planned in the area—the name was decided by 1833—but development was slow. Only two buildings were in place by 1854. By the 1860s it had reached its full length, running from the seafront to the original (now closed) Hove station on the London, Brighton and South Coast Railway's line to Portsmouth.

A Baptist fellowship was founded in the area in the 1870s. In its early years, their meetings and services were held at a gymnasium on Western Road. In 1881, George Congreve moved to Hove. He was trained in medicine and became wealthy by selling an elixir which apparently cured tuberculosis, but he also had a religious calling and planned to establish a new church. Between 1882 and 1883 he bought the site on which the church now stands from Sir Julian Goldsmid, who owned it by that stage. Congreve founded a Young Women's Christian Institute in 1882, and an iron building was erected on the site to accommodate it.

John Wills, a prolific designer of buildings for Nonconfirmist communities, was asked to design a permanent church for the congregation. (One of his later commissions was the Hove Methodist Church.) Congreve paid the full cost of construction and also became the church's first treasurer. Building work took place during 1887, and the first service was held on 29 July 1887. Charles Spurgeon, an influential Baptist preacher, was invited, but he could not attend because of illness. He helped in other ways, however: he sent his brother to preach in his place at the inaugural service and selected the church's first pastor; and one of his sons took this role subsequently. The first pastor, Rev. David Davies, served from 1887 until 1907; on his initiative, Gwydyr Mansions—an "elegant" block of mansion flats in the Flemish Renaissance style— were built opposite the church in 1890.

The temporary iron building was removed to allow the church to be built, and the Young Women's Christian Institute moved into new premises next to the church. A similar institute for men was established in 1899, but neither remain in existence. The church helped to establish two other Baptist places of worship in Hove. In 1901, a mission church established four years earlier in the west of Hove was connected administratively with Holland Road Baptist Church, and by 1904 it was able to move to its own 400-capacity premises. The Stoneham Road Baptist Church remained open on the same site until 2008, but the building was sold and demolished in that year. In 1957, a deaconess at Holland Road founded a new church on the rapidly developing Hangleton housing estate (the population grew from 109 to 6,158 between 1931 and 1951). It is now called the Oasis Christian Fellowship Church and is part of both the Baptist Union of Great Britain and the Evangelical Alliance.

In the 1970s, the church hall was redesigned, and exterior alterations and cleaning took place between 1980 and 1981. Work on the interior of the church had been proposed for many years, and an architect was appointed in 1991. When the plans were ratified in 1997, the structure and fabric of the building were found to be in unexpectedly poor condition. The hall was completely redesigned, an extension was built at the rear, the south end was altered, new windows were installed in the porch and structural alterations were carried out in the main part of the church. The project cost about £700,000 and was completed in 1999. The church repurchased the former Young Women's Christian Institute building in the 1990s after it had passed out of their ownership; it was believed to be in such poor condition that a proposal was made to demolish it and replace it with a new multi-purpose building to be used by the church and other groups. It eventually turned out to be in better condition than previously thought and was instead just completely refurbished.

The church is licensed for worship in accordance with the Places of Worship Registration Act 1855 and has the registration number 30365. It was registered for the solemnisation of marriages on 21 August 1888.

== Architecture ==
John Wills built the church in a Transitional Gothic style—commonly associated with Anglican churches of the 19th century but rare for a Nonconformist church of the era. The exterior is of pale Purbeck Stone, and the roof is tiled with slate. The church tower forms a local landmark: it stands slightly forward from the rest of the building, rises in four stages and is topped by a pointed roof in the Rhenish style.

The interior is aligned north to south, parallel to the road. The arched entrance door in the base of the tower, flanked by granite memorial tablets laid in 1887, leads to the transept, lit by a series of lancet windows with coloured glass. Below the hammerbeam roof, a gallery runs round three sides of the church, supported by Corinthian columns made of cast iron. There are rose windows in the south and north walls; the north window has a quatrefoil design and is decorated in the Arts and Crafts style. The original pews and an elaborate pulpit are still in place inside.

== The church today ==
Holland Road Baptist Church was listed at Grade II by English Heritage on 26 February 1991. It is one of 1,124 Grade II-listed buildings and structures, and 1,218 listed buildings of all grades, in the city of Brighton and Hove.

There are services on Sunday mornings, Sunday evenings and Tuesday afternoons. Some of these include Holy Communion. Several prayer groups and activities for children and young people take place regularly. The church also plays host to other Christian communities in the city, including Brighton Lutheran Mission—a member of the Evangelical Lutheran Church of England.

The church is one of eleven Baptist communities in the city of Brighton and Hove, ten of which have their own church premises. Seven of the eleven are part of the Mid Sussex Network of the South Eastern Baptist Association, one of nine divisions of the Baptist Union of Great Britain. Apart from the Holland Road Baptist Church, the other member churches are at Brighton (Florence Road and Gloucester Place), West Hove, Hangleton and Portslade, and the Downs Community Baptist Church in Woodingdean which no longer has its own building and meets in a school.

== See also ==
- Grade II listed buildings in Brighton and Hove: E–H
- List of places of worship in Brighton and Hove

== Bibliography ==
- Antram, Nicholas; Morrice, Richard (2008). Brighton and Hove. Pevsner Architectural Guides. London: Yale University Press. ISBN 978-0-300-12661-7.
- Elleray, D. Robert (2004). Sussex Places of Worship. Worthing: Optimus Books. ISBN 0-9533132-7-1.
- Middleton, Judy (2002). The Encyclopaedia of Hove & Portslade. Brighton: Brighton & Hove Libraries.
- Mitchell, Vic; Smith, Keith (1983). South Coast Railways: Brighton to Worthing. Midhurst: Middleton Press. ISBN 0-906520-03-7.
