= Queen's Road Methodist Church =

Queen's Road Methodist Church, Beeston
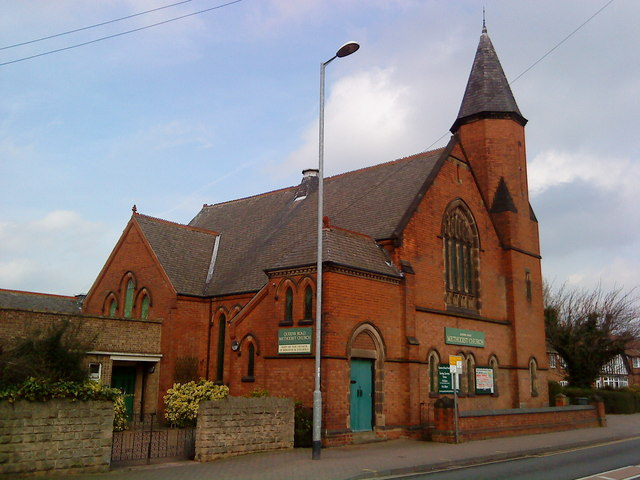
- Queen's Road Methodist Church, Beeston
- Queen's Road Methodist Church, Beeston
- 52.925953°N 1.20548°W
- Country: England
- Denomination: Wesleyan Methodist
- Website: queensroadmethodistchurch.org

Architecture
- Architect: John Wills
- Completed: 1900
- Construction cost: £1,900

Queen's Road Methodist Church was a Methodist church in Beeston, Nottinghamshire, England.

== History ==
The church had its origins in a mission formed in connection with the Chapel-Street Wesleyan Church in 1884.

The church was built by the contractor William Edwards of Derby, to designs by John Wills, who in the same year built an almost identical chapel in Borrowash - see (Borrowash Methodist Church). The church was opened on 24 May 1900.

The building was designed for 425 people and cost around £1,900 (equivalent to £201,913 in 2025).

As of 2014 the church merged with the congregations at Wollaton Road Methodist Church, Chilwell Road Methodist Church and the former site at Queen's Road went up for sale in 2018.
