= John Wills (architect) =

English architect

John Wills (1846 – 20 June 1906) was an architect based in Derby.

== Personal life ==
He lived at Dodbrook, 136 Whitaker Road, Derby, a house he designed himself.

For many years he was president of the Derby and Derbyshire Band of Hope Union, and treasurer of the South Derbyshire Liberal Association. He was also a councillor on Derby Town Council for the Becket Ward in the 1880s. He was a trustee of Green-hill Chapel in Derby.

He died in Salcombe, Devon on 20 June 1906.

== Career ==
He formed a partnership with his sons William Francis Wills (b. 1877) and John Ross Wills (b. 1882). His practice was based at Victoria Street Chambers in Derby. He was responsible for building many non-conformist chapels in the Midlands and in the southeastern counties of Sussex, Middlesex, Essex and Kent. He has been called the "pre-eminent architect" of Baptist chapels in Kent, where his designs ranged from expensive, large chapels in towns to small wayside chapels in rural areas. His Baptist church at Holland Road in Hove has been called one of the most important Nonconformist chapels of the Victorian era in Sussex.

He was the author of Hints to Trustees of Chapel Property and Chapel Keepers' Manual which was in its 3rd edition by 1884.

=== Buildings ===
- 1878 Futhergate Congregational Chapel, Blackburn
- 1879 Primitive Methodist Chapel, Cross Keys.
- 1881 Victoria Baptist Church, Deal, Kent
- 1882 Chesterfield Primitive Methodist Chapel
- 1883 Unitarian Chapel, Llandysul.
- 1885 Ceylon Place Baptist Church, Eastbourne
- 1886 Park Street Wesleyan Methodist, Blaenavon.
- 1886 Brasted Baptist Chapel, Brasted, Kent
- 1886 Vine Baptist Chapel, Sevenoaks, Kent
- 1887 Fowey Congregational Chapel, Cornwall
- 1887 Holland Road Baptist Church, Hove
- 1887 Townend Memorial Methodist Chapel, Knockholt, Kent
- 1888 Normanton on Soar Wesleyan Chapel
- 1889 Baptist Tabernacle, New Brompton, Kent
- 1891 St Paul's Wesleyan Methodist, Penmaenmawr.
- 1892 Yalding Baptist Chapel, Yalding, Kent
- 1895 Prichard Memorial Baptist, Llangollen
- 1895 Hove Methodist Church, Hove
- 1896 Brimington Wesleyan Chapel, Derbyshire
- 1897 Chiswick Baptist Chapel, London
- 1897 Wesleyan Chapel, St Lawrence, Ramsgate, Kent
- 1898 Wesleyan Church and schools, Firth Park Road, Sheffield
- 1898 Babington Buildings, St. Peter's Street, Derby for the Public Benefit Boot & Shoe Company
- 1899 Cornerstone Methodist Church, Worthing
- 1899 Cavendish Baptist Schools, Ramsgate, Kent
- 1899 Fitzwalter Road Wesleyan Chapel, Sheffield
- 1900 Bucks Road Primitive Methodist Chapel, Douglas, Isle of Man
- 1900 Wesleyan Methodist, Milford Haven.
- 1900 Queen's Road Methodist Church, Beeston, Nottingham
- 1900 Borrowash Methodist Church
- 1901 Victoria Road Congregational Church, Portsmouth
- 1902 Osmaston Wesleyan Church, Derbyshire
- 1902 London Road Baptist Church, Portsmouth
- 1903 Waltham Abbey Wesleyan Church and Sunday School, Essex
- 1905 Wealdstone Baptist Church
- 1905 Bethel Methodist Church, Brighouse, West Yorkshire
- 1905 Baptist Chapel, Eastleigh, Hampshire
- 1906 Wesleyan Methodist Church, St. Keverne, Cornwall
- 1910 Wesleyan Church, Sutton-on-Sea, Lincolnshire
- 1913 Pellon Baptist Church, Halifax, West Yorkshire

== Bibliography ==
- Elleray, D. Robert (1981). The Victorian Churches of Sussex. Chichester: Phillimore & Co. ISBN 0-85033-378-4.
- Elleray, D. Robert (2004). Sussex Places of Worship. Worthing: Optimus Books. ISBN 0-9533132-7-1.
- Homan, Roger (1984). The Victorian Churches of Kent. Chichester: Phillimore & Co. ISBN 0-85033-466-7.
- O'Brien, Charles; Bailey, Bruce; Pevsner, Nikolaus; Lloyd, David W. (2018). Hampshire: South. The Buildings of England. London: Yale University Press. ISBN 978-0-300-22503-7.
