= St Patrick's Church, Hove =

Anglican church in Hove, England

St Patrick, Hove
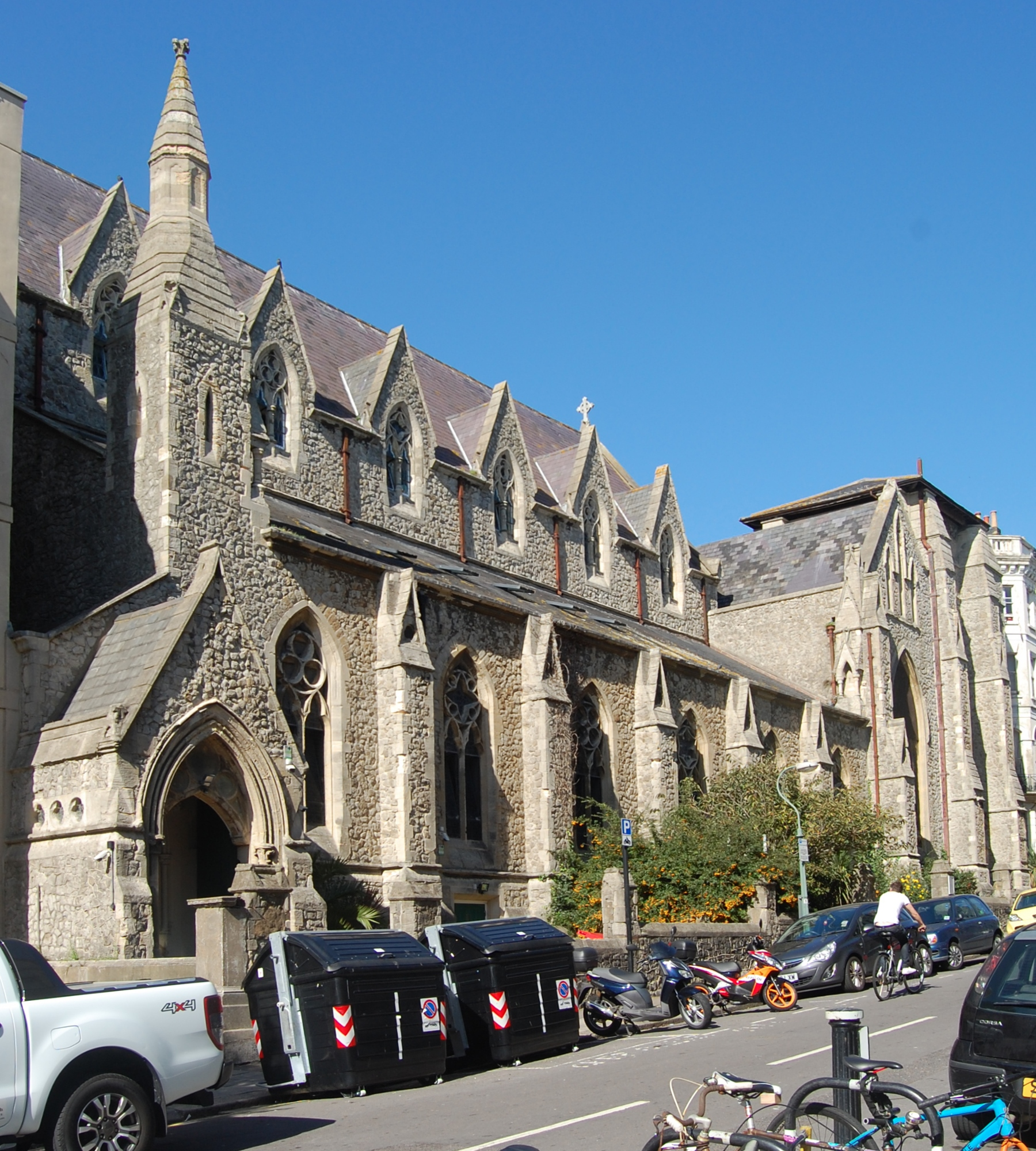
- The church from the southeast
- St Patrick, Hove
- 50°49′33.54″N 0°9′27.62″W
- Denomination: Church of England

History
- Dedication: Saint Patrick

Administration
- Province: Canterbury
- Diocese: Chichester
- Archdeaconry: Chichester
- Deanery: Rural Deanery of Hove

St Patrick's Church is an Anglican church in Hove, in the English city of Brighton and Hove. Situated on a narrow site at 3 Cambridge Road, off Western Road close to the boundary with Brighton, it is still in use as a place of worship. Since 1985 St Pat's developed a special ministry with homeless people, setting up a night shelter and a homeless hostel. In 2012, St Patrick's night shelter was closed. The homeless hostel continues to operate under new management, and is currently run by Riverside Housing Association. The church closed as a parish in 2015, and was then entrusted by the Bishop of Chichester to the Chemin Neuf Community under a Bishop's Mission Order. The leader of the Chemin Neuf Mission at St Patrick's is currently the Revd Tim Watson.

== History ==
The Brunswick Estate had been developed from 1824 onwards at the eastern edge of Hove, on the border with Brighton, on land originally belonging to Wick Farm. In 1851, the whole of the Wick Farm estate passed into the control of the Brunswick Square Commissioners. This land was rapidly developed as a residential area by Sir Isaac Goldsmid, 1st Baronet. St Andrew's Church in Waterloo Street, nominally the church of the Brunswick Estate, was a long way from this new housing and, being used mainly by the aristocratic classes, only had eighty pews which were not subject to pew rental fees. This made it unsuitable for the lower-class, poorer residents of the new development, so an Irish-born priest, Dr James O'Brien, decided to build another church in the area. As with several other churches in Brighton and Hove at that time, this was a proprietary chapel which he owned and ran himself, gaining an income from pew rents, marriage and funeral fees and various other sources. An Act of Parliament was normally needed before a proprietary chapel could be built, but none was granted in the case of this church.

Construction started in July 1857 and the church was opened under licence on 20 October 1858. The Bishop of Chichester, Dr Ashurst Turner Gilbert, attended the first service. In its first few years, the church was known as St James' Church; it changed to St Patrick's and St James' in 1865, and finally became St Patrick's in 1868. The cost of construction was nearly £13,500, although rental income from some of the pews helped to offset this.

The church was given a parish on 21 August 1885 by Rev. Ridley Daniel-Tyssen, one of the O'Briens' seven nephews, who took control of the church after his uncle's death despite a High Court challenge at the Court of Chancery from another nephew who contended that he should have inherited the church: Dr O'Brien had not written in his will that Daniel-Tyssen was to receive the church and the curacy, and his wife's will incorrectly stated that he had. The Bishop of Chichester had been called as a witness. In the late 20th century the parish was amalgamated with that of St Andrew's Church on Waterloo Street, which was closed and declared redundant in 1990. It now covers the area between Holland Road, Lansdowne Road, the Brighton/Hove boundary and the seafront.

The Revd Dr Steven Underdown was appointed Priest-in-Charge of St Patrick's in October 2009. He had been involved with parish during the 1980s and '90s and in 2002 had submitted a successful PhD thesis (Kings's College London) which was concerned in part with the life and worship of St Patrick's.

== Architecture ==
Only the eastern side of the church is visible from the road. The architect was Henry Edward Kendall Jr. (1805–1855), who had designed the Sussex County Lunatic Asylum (later St Francis Hospital) in Haywards Heath and worked on the Knebworth estate inherited by the novelist Edward Bulwer-Lytton. Kendall adopted the Early English Gothic style and used Kentish ragstone with stone dressings and a slate roof. An octagonal tower was started but never completed, leaving a stump in one corner. The interior consists of a chancel, side chapels, an aisled nave and a narthex to the south. The chancel, which features stencilling and paintings from the 1890s, is topped by a hammerbeam roof, and the roof of the nave has gabled clerestory windows. An organ built by Henry Willis & Sons was installed in 1865, but was moved from one of the side chapels to the wall of the tower about 40 years later.

Several distinguished architects provided internal fittings at St Patrick's. William Butterfield designed the north window as a "memorial" to Dr O'Brien and his wife Octavia, who were still alive at the time (they both died in 1884, 14 years after the window was installed), another window on the northeastern side, and the lectern, cast in brass and featuring an eagle and St Patrick. This dates from 1873. A red sandstone reredos of the Crucifixion of Jesus was presented by Somers Clarke in 1887. Sir George Gilbert Scott designed the pulpit. Other features include several stained glass windows, a font of alabaster, a set of Stations of the Cross in the form of framed oil paintings, frescoes in memory of Octavia O'Brien and a memorial tablet for Rev. Daniel-Tyssen. Both he and his uncle were buried at St Andrew's Church, Hove's parish church.

The church received criticism in its early years for its appearance and for the nature of its services. Harry Stuart Goodhart-Rendel dismissed it as "spacious without grandeur and ornate without grace"; the early interior decorations and fixtures were described as "primitive"; and although there is now a large array of stained glass, it was all installed some time after the church opened. More controversially, Dr O'Brien—who had named himself perpetual curate of the church—had a strong interest in the use of music in Christian worship, and St Patrick's was unrivalled in Brighton or Hove for several decades for its music and the size of its choir. However, in the towns at that time there were many opponents of such "High Church" practices, and the church received the mocking nickname "Paddy's Music Hall".

== Monastic community ==
In 1985, Dr Eric Kemp, the Bishop of Chichester, invited an Anglican monastic community, the Community of the Servants of the Will of God (CSWG), whose principal monastery was at Crawley Down, thirty miles north of Brighton & Hove, to be involved in St Patrick's, and in June 1985 six monks took up residence at 23 Cambridge Road, converting the house into a monastery. It took the name The Monastery of Christ the Saviour. However, owing to there only be around 12 monks in the order, the community was not large enough to support the project and they withdrew.

== Homeless Hostel ==
St Patricks is now best known in the city for its partial conversion into a hostel for the homeless. The origins of this are from the winter of 1985 when the priest, Father Alan Sharpe, allowed two homeless people to sleep on the floor of the church after they went to the vicarage. This continued, and more homeless people were encouraged to stay overnight.

In 1987 the narthex was converted into a dedicated night shelter and a charity was formed to raise money to develop the shelter further, in particular by redeveloping the interior of the church to dedicate more space to homeless people. The Lorica Trust was set up for this purpose; it consisted of three divisions, offering night shelter and hostel accommodation to homeless people; providing services to people with learning disabilities in East Sussex, West Sussex and Surrey; and operating church-based community projects and helping churches work together with their local communities. The shelter was extended to 12 beds in 1993 and 22 beds in 1999, when it moved to the northern part of the church.

In 2008, Sharpe resigned his ministry and quit as a director of the Lorica Trust after an undercover documentary team filmed him apparently giving a drug addict money to buy drugs, and alleged that this money had been taken from funds donated for the work of the Trust or from the church collection plates. Sharpe always denied the allegations: "Everything I have done has been open, as a genuine, heartfelt Christian response to the needs of marginalised people." He remained in good standing with the Diocese of Chichester and was subsequently appointed Priest in Charge of Sedlescombe.

The night shelter was closed in 2012 and the remaining hostel is now managed by Riverside, a registered provider of social housing in the UK. The hostel is no longer a drop-in service and only accepts referrals from Brighton and Hove Council's Rough Sleepers Street Services Team (RSSST). There is a minimum three-month stay and the average length of stay is 12–18 months.

== See also ==
- Grade II listed buildings in Brighton and Hove: S
- List of places of worship in Brighton and Hove

== Bibliography ==
- Dale, Antony (1989). Brighton Churches. London: Routledge. ISBN 0-415-00863-8.
