= Park Crescent =

Park Crescent may refer to:

- Park Crescent, Brighton, England
- Park Crescent, London, England
- Park Crescent, Worthing, England
