= Percy and Wagner Almshouses =

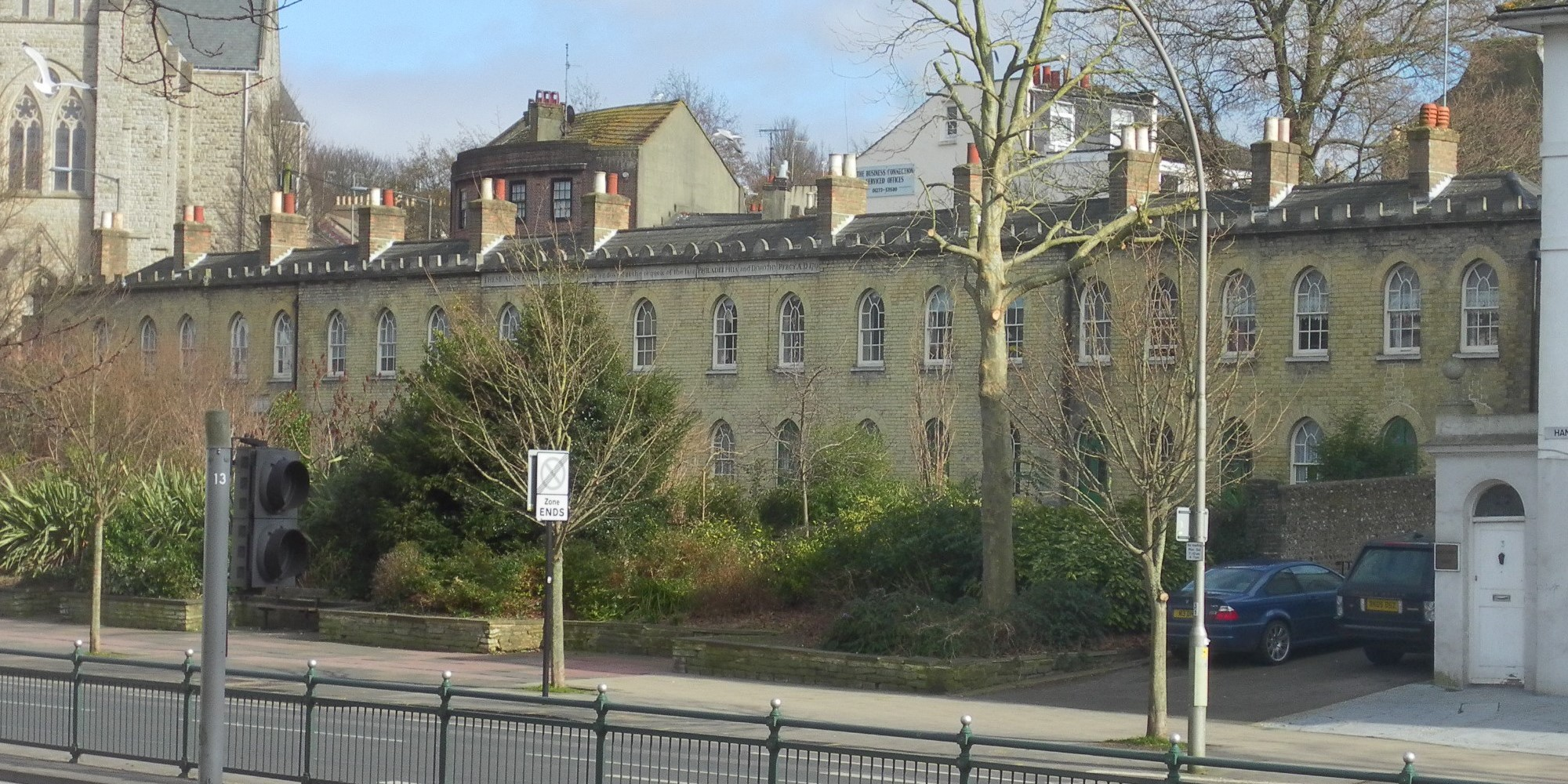
- The almshouses viewed from the west

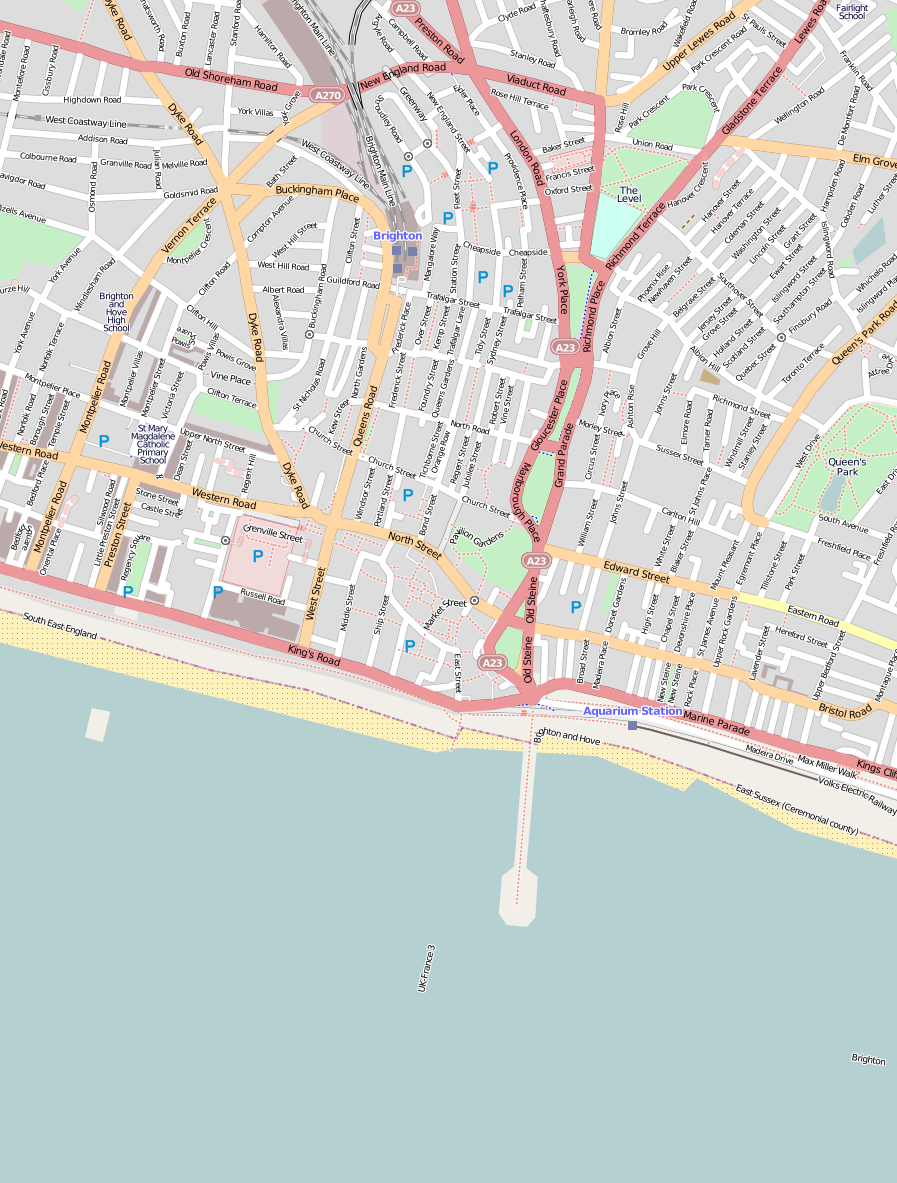
- Location within central Brighton
- 50.831846°N 0.129754°W
- Location: 1–12 Lewes Road, Hanover, Brighton and Hove, East Sussex, United Kingdom

History
- Founded: 1795
- Built: 1795 (nos. 4–9); 1859 (nos. 1–3, 10–12)

Site notes
- Architectural style: Gothic Revival
- Restored: c. 1975
- Restored by: Fitzroy Robinson Miller Bourne & Partners

Listed Building – Grade II
- Official name: Percy and Wagner Almshouses, Nos. 1–12 (consecutive) Lewes Road
- Designated: 5 March 1971
- Reference no.: 1381669

The Percy and Wagner Almshouses are a group of 12 almshouses in the inner-city Hanover area of the English coastal city of Brighton and Hove. The first six date from 1795 and are among the few pre-19th-century buildings left in the city. Six more were added in a matching style in 1859. They are the only surviving almshouses in Brighton and have been listed at Grade II for their architectural and historical importance.

The six original houses were the first buildings in the Lewes Road valley: when they were built, the nearest houses were a long way to the south at Old Steine. No more than tiny cottages, the almshouses were intended for poor widows who lived within the parish of Brighton. The additional houses of 1859 were provided for unmarried women. The houses, which were sometimes occupied by more than one resident, served the same purpose for over a century until they fell into dereliction in the 1960s. They were saved from demolition in the 1970s and were rebuilt instead, and are still occupied.

== History ==
Lewes Road originated as one of Brighton's main turnpiked routes. Like London Road, it led northwards along a valley floor. It was crossed by an ancient west-east trackway which by the end of the 18th century was used by visitors walking to the new racecourse on Whitehawk Hill. This later became Elm Grove, an important road.

The first buildings on Lewes Road were the first six of what later became the Percy and Wagner Almshouses. When they were erected in 1795, in "quite [an] isolated position" near the Elm Grove junction, they were known as the Percy Almshouses (or Percy Alms Houses) because they commemorated Dorothea and Philadelphia Percy, two of the daughters of Hugh Percy, 2nd Duke of Northumberland. Their friend Margaret Marriot paid for the houses, which were intended for "six poor widows who were members of the Church of England within the parish of Brighton" (i.e. the area served by St Nicholas' Church) and who did not receive poor relief. The endowment provided by Marriot provided an income used to buy clothes for each resident. Brighton department store Hanningtons supplied each widow with two gowns valued between 12 and 15 shillings, a duffel cloak "not to exceed in value 21 shillings nor less than 18 shillings" in alternate years, and a black bonnet once every three years to a maximum value of 10 shillings. Any remaining money was divided equally between the residents every quarter. This amounted to about £48 per year at first between the six residents. Still, the endowment was later increased to £96 when the six additional houses were built. The clothing allowance was also changed to provide two gowns and bonnets every year and a duffel cloak once every three years.

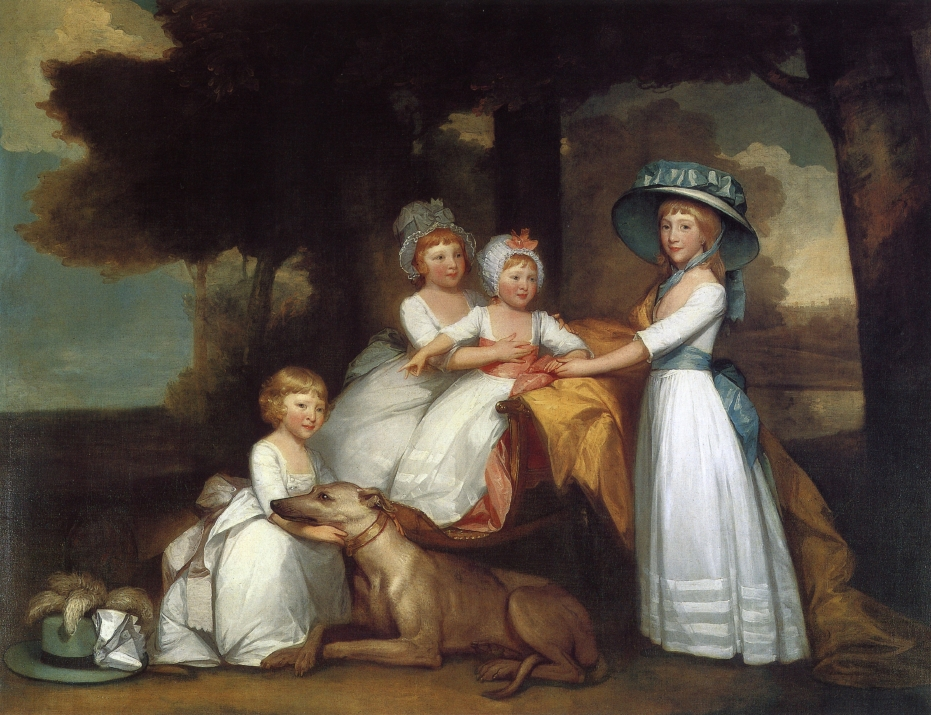
The six original almshouses commemorated two daughters of the Duke of Northumberland.

The almshouses originally "stood in open country" opposite one corner of The Level, a large area of common land used for fairs and recreational activities. An 1807 watercolor shows the six original houses surrounded by a low stone wall with fields on all sides. Hilly Laine (the site of the future Hanover and Elm Grove residential areas) rises behind the buildings. They were Brighton's first Gothic Revival non-ecclesiastical buildings. The same style was adopted in 1859 when they were added to. Three were built on each side of the original block, which was then renumbered between 4 and 9. The new houses were built in memory of Frederick Hervey, 1st Marquess of Bristol, who died in 1859, and were paid for by Vicar of Brighton Henry Michell Wagner and his sister Mary. They were intended for "six poor maidens".

The United Kingdom Census 1861 revealed that none of the Wagner almshouses were occupied yet. The six Percy almshouses were still numbered 1–6 and were all occupied, mostly by elderly widows—although there were also two unmarried women, one married woman (who shared number 2 with an 87-year-old widow) and an 8-year-old boy who was the grandson of a widow living at number 5. He was the only Brighton-born resident: the other nine occupants of the six houses were from a wide range of counties across southern and western England. Despite their small size, three of the six houses were occupied by either two or three residents. By the time of the United Kingdom Census 1891, all twelve houses had residents; they were split equally between unmarried women and widows, and some still had more than one occupant. One resident from this era was a former servant to Rev. Wagner, who left her money in his will. Most residents of that era would have been like her: "respectable working ladies of no independent means".

The ordering of clothing from Hanningtons continued until the early 20th century, but residents were later given a financial allowance instead. The almshouses were repaired in 1901 and were connected to the gas and water mains in 1930. Gradually, though, the houses fell into a state of dilapidation. By the 1960s, they were in poor condition, and only one was occupied by 1971. In that year, the trustees of the almshouses sought demolition and redevelopment. Still, after a campaign, they were awarded listed status. They were given funding by Brighton Borough Council. The houses were restored in 1975–76 by architects Fitzroy Robinson Miller Bourne & Partners. The work consisted of internal alterations and extensions at the rear to provide new bathrooms and kitchens.

The Percy and Wagner Almshouses were listed at Grade II on 5 March 1971. English Heritage defines Grade II-listed buildings as "nationally important and of special interest". As of February 2001, there were 1,124 Grade II-listed buildings and structures, and 1,218 listed buildings of all grades, in the city of Brighton and Hove. Hanover Crescent, another terrace of Grade II-listed houses, have adjoined the almshouses since the 1820s.

No other almshouses survive in Brighton. The Howell's Almshouses on George Street in Kemptown were demolished after falling derelict in the 1960s; they had been built in 1859 by Charles Howell "for the benefit of the reduced inhabitants of Brighton and Hove". Pilgrim's Cottages had been built seven years earlier and were also demolished in the 1960s. They were on Spa Street (now vanished) in the Queen's Park area. In Hove, the Williamson Cottage Homes on Portland Road were still used as almshouses until 1985, but they became empty in that year and were taken over by squatters. Modern flats were built behind a new façade that resembled the original and retained original features such as plaques, inscriptions, and a bust.

== Architecture ==
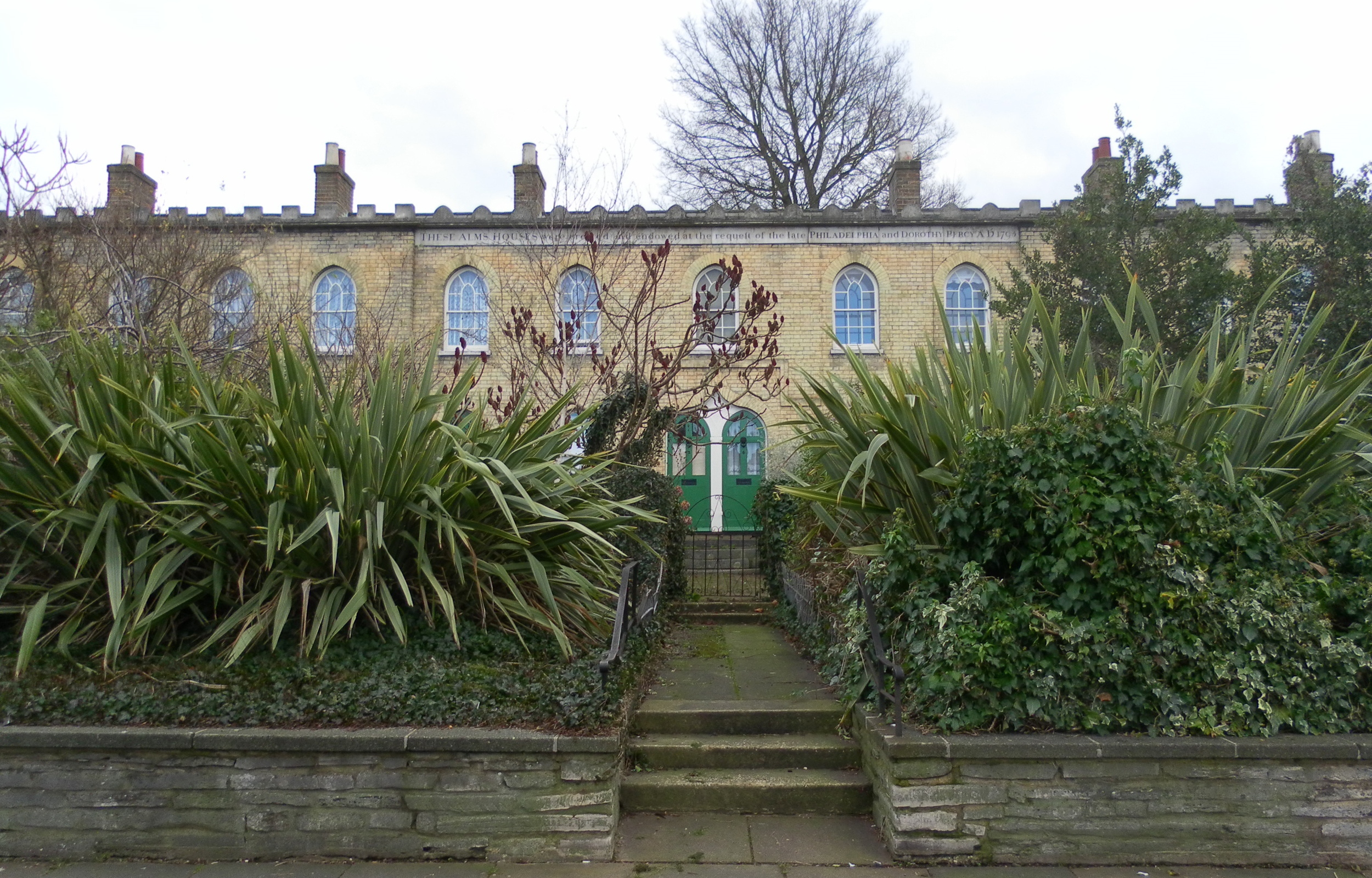
The centre bay has an ogee-arched entrance and a commemorative inscription.

The almshouses are simple, "plain" two-storey cottages of yellow stock brick laid in the Flemish bond pattern. The six original houses have an 11-bay range and feature castellation along the parapet. The later houses on the south and north sides were added in the same style, so the façade is now of 23 bays in a 4–2–3–5–2–4 pattern. Each house has two sash windows with glazing bars in a pointed-arched style in keeping with the Gothic Revival architecture of the houses. The two houses in the middle have just six windows between them, three on each storey, and also have a centrally placed ogee-headed entrance. Each house also has its own entrance set under a smaller pointed arch. The roof is of slate, and a chimneystack sits on top of each party wall.

The founders are commemorated by inscriptions and plaques. At parapet level in the centre of the terrace is an inscription reading "THESE ALMS HOUSES were erected and endowed at the request of the late PHILADELPHIA and DOROTHY PERCY A D 1795". Number 3, one of the 1859 houses, has a plaque reading "1859 In pious remembrance of The Marquis of Bristol M.A.W. and H.M.W" across four lines.

As a non-ecclesiastical Gothic-style building, the Percy and Wagner Almshouses are almost unique in Brighton: the remnants of Gothic House in Western Road (now part of a shop) by Amon Henry Wilds and Wykeham Terrace (attributed to the same architect) near St Nicholas' Church are the only other examples.

== See also ==
- Grade II listed buildings in Brighton and Hove: P–R
- Media related to Percy and Wagner Almshouses at Wikimedia Commons

== Bibliography ==
- Antram, Nicholas; Morrice, Richard (2008). Brighton and Hove. Pevsner Architectural Guides. London: Yale University Press. ISBN 978-0-300-12661-7.
- Brighton Polytechnic. School of Architecture and Interior Design (1987). A Guide to the Buildings of Brighton. Macclesfield: McMillan Martin. ISBN 1-869865-03-0.
- Carder, Timothy (1990). The Encyclopaedia of Brighton. Lewes: East Sussex County Libraries. ISBN 0-86147-315-9.
- Collis, Rose (2010). The New Encyclopaedia of Brighton. (based on the original by Tim Carder) (1st ed.). Brighton: Brighton & Hove Libraries. ISBN 978-0-9564664-0-2.
- Dale, Antony (1986) [1951]. About Brighton: A Guide to the Buildings and Byways of Brighton and Hove (2nd Revised ed.). Brighton: The Regency Society of Brighton and Hove.
- Jones, Lavender; Pollard, Jacqueline (1999). Hilly Laine to Hanover: a Brighton Neighbourhood. Brighton: Brighton Books Publishing. ISBN 978-1-901454-04-8.
- Middleton, Judy (2002). The Encyclopaedia of Hove & Portslade. Brighton: Brighton & Hove Libraries.
