= Gothic House (disambiguation) =

Gothic House is a Gothic-style building in the centre of Brighton, England.

Gothic House may also refer to:

- Gothic House (Bad Homburg), Bad Homburg, Hesse-Homburg, Germany
- Gothic House (Puławy), Puławy, Poland
- Gothic House, Brighton, West Sussex, United Kingdom
- The Gothic House, Portland, Maine, United States

== See also ==
- American Gothic House or Dibble House, a house in Eldon, Iowa, United States
