= Wykeham Terrace, Brighton =

Wykeham Terrace
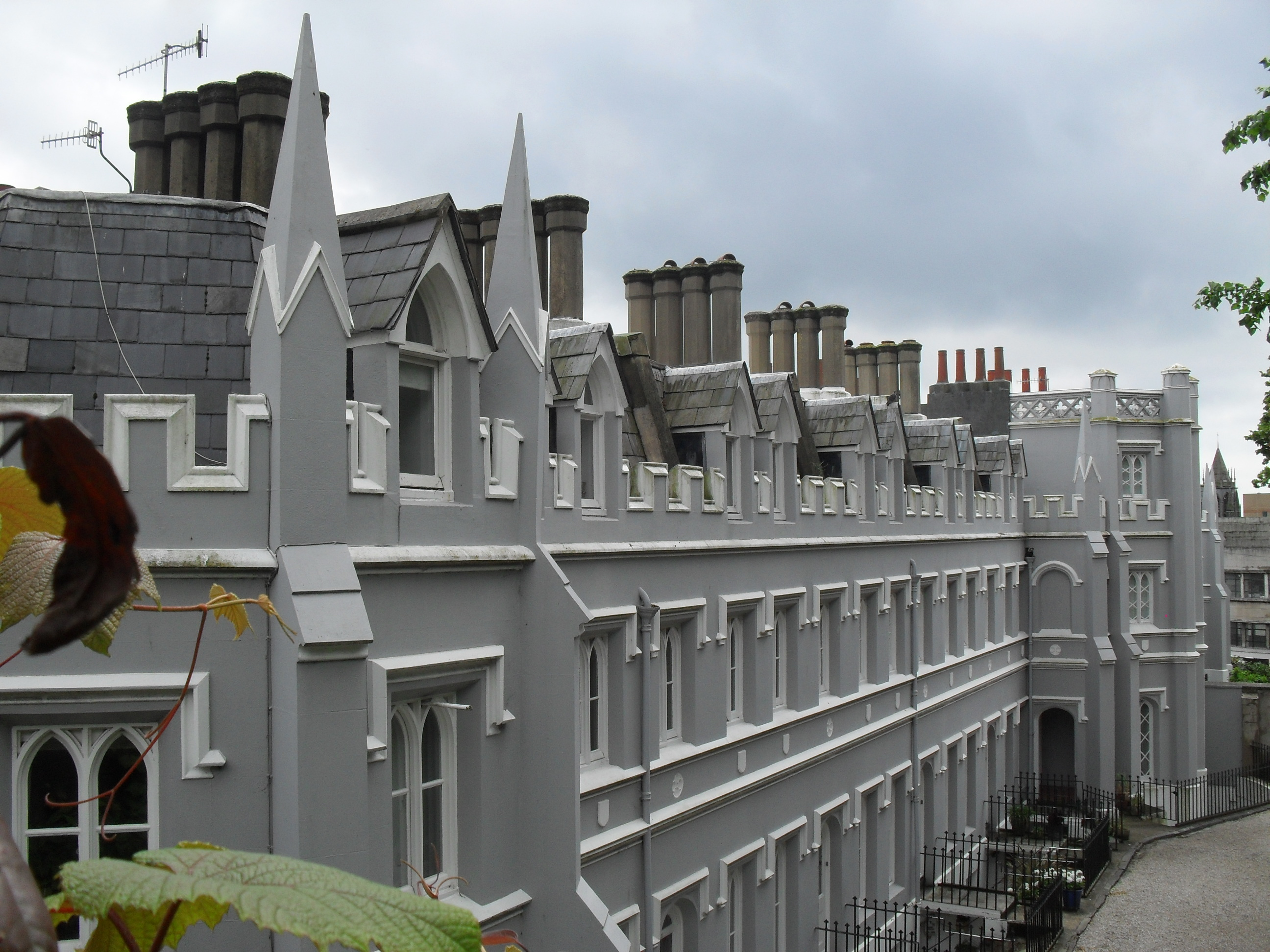
- The terrace from the northwest

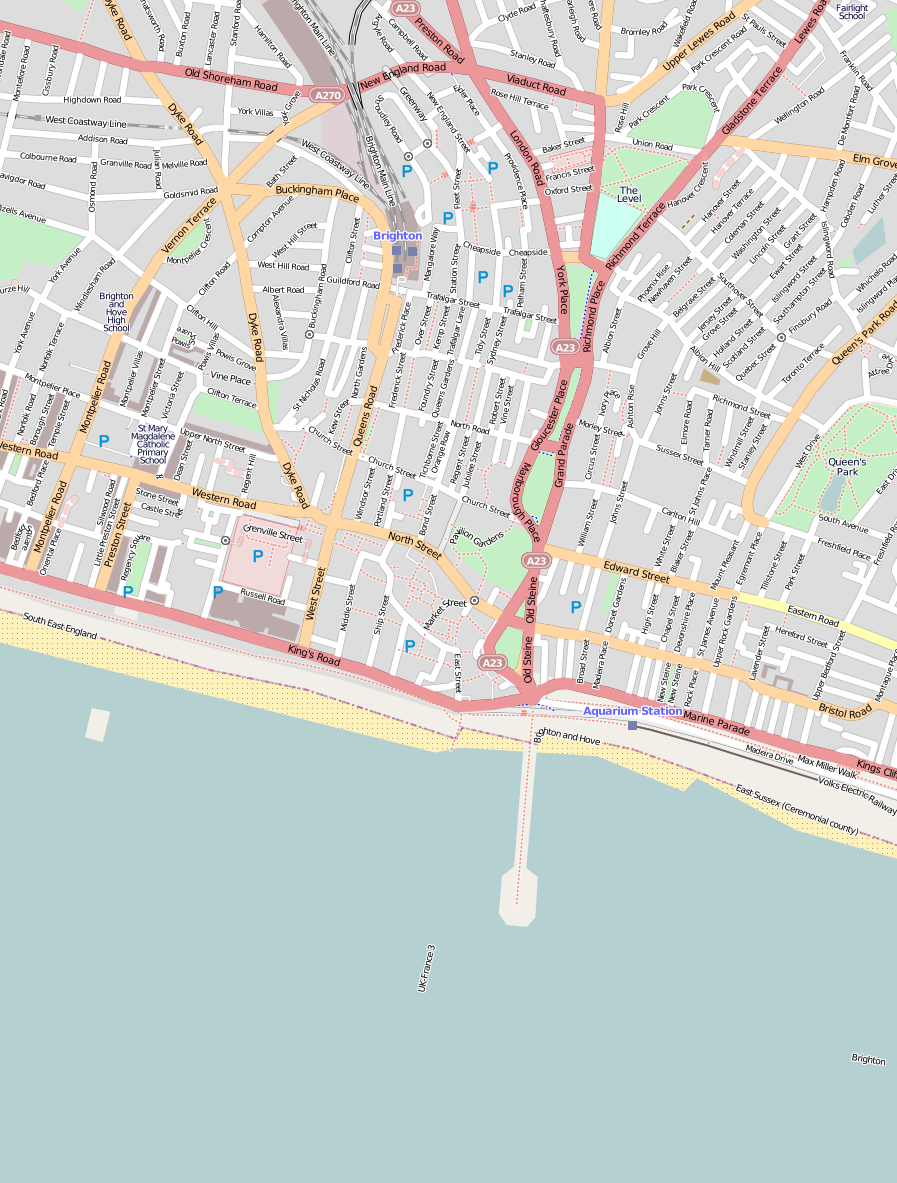
- Location within central Brighton
- 50.8246°N 0.1445°W
- Location: 1–12 Wykeham Terrace, Dyke Road, Brighton, Brighton and Hove, East Sussex, United Kingdom

History
- Built: 1827–1830

Site notes
- Architect: Amon Henry Wilds (attr.)
- Architectural style: Tudor-Gothic

Listed Building – Grade II
- Official name: 1–12 Wykeham Terrace
- Designated: 4 July 1969
- Reference no.: 1381112

Wykeham Terrace is a row of 12 early 19th-century houses in central Brighton, part of the English city of Brighton and Hove. The Tudor-Gothic building, attributed to prominent local architect Amon Henry Wilds, is built into the hillside below the churchyard of Brighton's ancient parish church. Uses since its completion in 1830 have included a home for former prostitutes and a base for the Territorial Army, but the terrace is now exclusively residential again. Its architecture is unusual in Brighton, whose 19th-century buildings are predominantly in the Regency style. English Heritage has listed the terrace at Grade II for its architectural and historical importance.

== History ==
St Nicholas' Church, Brighton's oldest Christian place of worship and its parish church until 1873, stands on a hill well behind the English Channel coast on which the old fishing village of Brighthelmston developed. French raids during the 16th century damaged or destroyed much of the settlement, and only the church survived unscathed. Decline set in until the mid-18th century, when the good climate, patronage by wealthy, fashionable visitors, better transport and the growth of the sea-bathing and "water cure" fad transformed Brighthelmston into the popular resort of Brighton.

Residential development proceeded rapidly around the core of the fishing village. Amon Henry Wilds, his father Amon Wilds and another architect, Charles Busby, were the most important builders and designers in Brighton's early 19th-century growth period: they worked jointly or individually on dozens of residential, religious and secular buildings and developed Brighton's characteristic Regency style. In 1827, Amon Henry Wilds is believed to have been commissioned to design Wykeham Terrace (although this attribution has not been established definitively). The site, east of the road from central Brighton to Devil's Dyke on the South Downs, was dug into the hillside on which St Nicholas' churchyard stands. The terrace was completed in 1830.

In the 1850s, 325 prostitutes (including 25 children) and 97 brothels were recorded in Brighton, and these were known to be underestimates. In 1853, Rev. George Wagner of St Stephen's Church, a cousin of Rev. Arthur Wagner (curate and later vicar of St Paul's Church), established a house on the town's Lewes Road to which prostitutes could be sent by police and doctors to be helped and rehabilitated. Only 12 women could be accommodated in this building, so in 1855 Wagner bought houses in Wykeham Terrace and the adjacent Queen Square and expanded the institution. In 1857, after George Wagner died, Arthur Wagner himself took over responsibility for the home, by way of the Community of the Virgin Mary—a Brighton-based convent which he had founded. They renamed the institution St Mary's Home for Female Penitents, and expanded it further to take in all of Wykeham Terrace apart from numbers 6, 7 and 12. The west side of Queen Square, whose buildings backed on to the terrace, was also occupied. Although conditions for the former prostitutes were strict, with regular surveillance, hard work and punishments for misbehaviour, the institution was able to offer about 40 women proper healthcare, education, training for domestic service, and charitable help of various kinds. Constance Kent, convicted of an infamous child murder in 1865 in a case which revolved around priest–penitent privilege, worked at the Home during this time. By the 1880s, the Home expanded further to take in disabled, elderly and destitute women from around Brighton, and orphans: nearly 300 people lived there. The institution moved in part to Egremont Place in the Queen's Park area in 1866, and in its entirety to Rottingdean in 1912. (The building provided for it there is now residential, but the community of nuns survives in Rottingdean, an outlying village which is now part of the city of Brighton and Hove.)

The terrace returned to residential use after that, but the Army owned some of the houses at one point in the 20th century and turned them into quarters for married soldiers. The whole terrace was then bought by the Territorial Army, again to provide housing for their soldiers. Squatters took over in the 1960s, and the Territorial Army sold the building to a developer for refurbishment and conversion back to private houses and flats. This took place during 1970.

Notable residents have included actress Dame Flora Robson, who lived at number 7 in the last years of her life; art historian Sir Roy Strong; singer-songwriter David Courtney; and singer Adam Faith. Courtney wrote many songs for Leo Sayer at his flat, and Faith managed the singer.

Wykeham Terrace was listed at Grade II by English Heritage on 4 July 1969. This status is given to "nationally important buildings of special interest". As of February 2001, it was one of 1,124 Grade II-listed buildings and structures, and 1,218 listed buildings of all grades, in the city of Brighton and Hove.

== Architecture ==
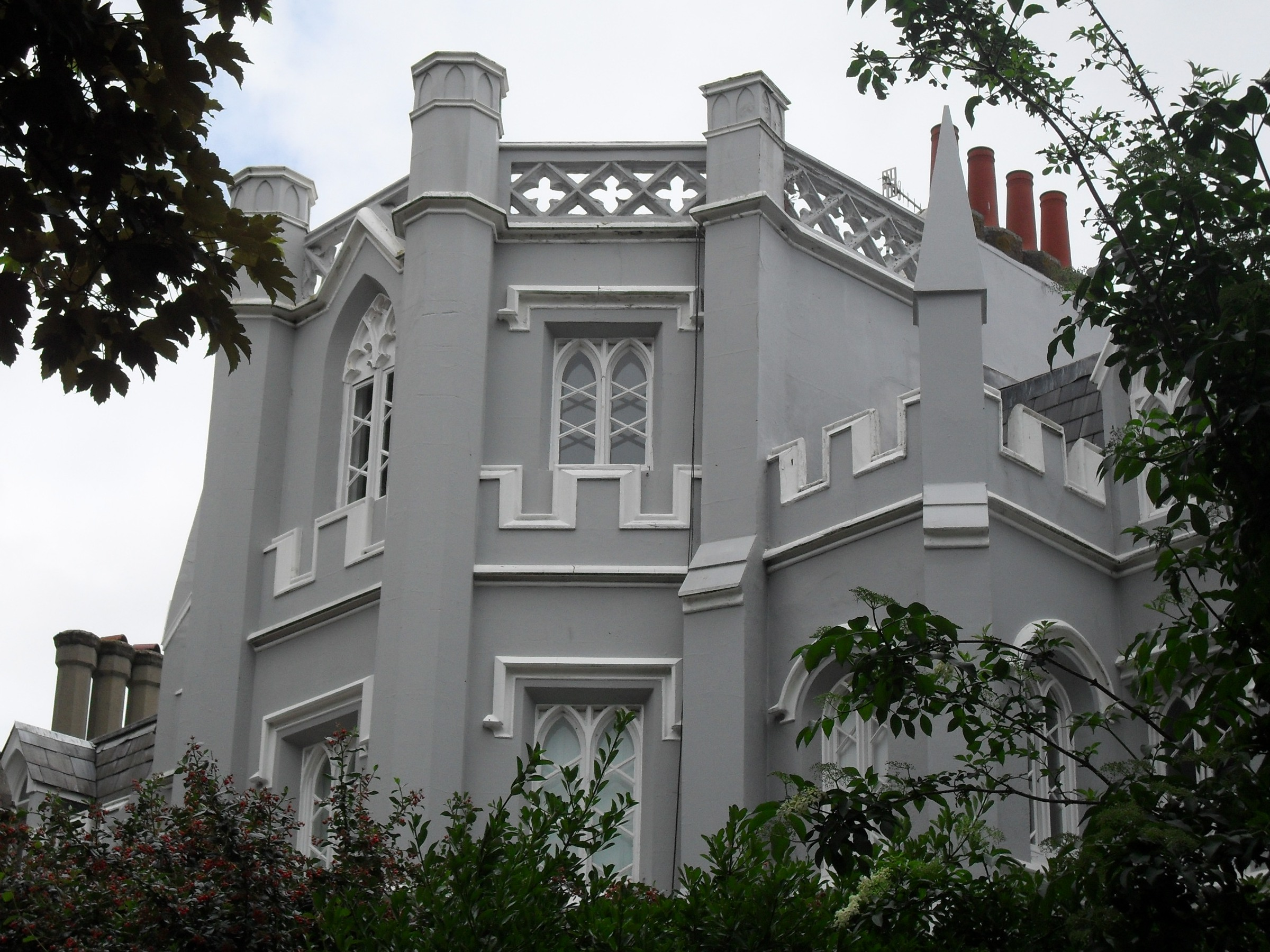
The five-sided centre bay is topped by a decorative parapet.

As a non-ecclesiastical Gothic-style building, Wykeham Terrace is almost unique in Brighton: the remnants of Gothic House in Western Road (now part of a shop), built by Amon Henry Wilds, and the Percy and Wagner Almshouses on Lewes Road, are the only other examples. It has been called a "charming Gothic confection", and is generally considered "attractive" and "pleasant". The curious styling is described as Tudor-Gothic (with "Tudor" reflecting the brief 19th-century revival of the original Tudor form), but Nikolaus Pevsner and Ian Nairn considered it Gothic above all, and the description "Regency-Gothic" has also been used in view of some Regency-style elements.

The whole terrace is faced with grey-painted cement and stucco. The mansard roof, with dormer windows, is laid with slate. The long façade is symmetrical but uneven in height: the houses have either two or three storeys with a basement. At the south and north ends, three-sided bays project forwards and are topped by pinnacles. In the centre, forming part of numbers 7 and 8, a similar polygonal bay projects from the terrace to form its centrepiece. Except on these bays, all windows are paired lancets with flat hood moulds, some of which retain their unusual diamond-pattern bars. The central, five-sided bay is of three storeys, with a large pointed-arched lancet window at the top; a gable cuts into the decorative parapet above it, and buttresses on each side terminate in flat-topped projections.

== Bibliography ==
- Antram, Nicholas; Morrice, Richard (2008). Brighton and Hove. Pevsner Architectural Guides. London: Yale University Press. ISBN 978-0-300-12661-7.
- Brighton Polytechnic. School of Architecture and Interior Design (1987). A Guide to the Buildings of Brighton. Macclesfield: McMillan Martin. ISBN 1-869865-03-0.
- Carder, Timothy (1990). The Encyclopaedia of Brighton. Lewes: East Sussex County Libraries. ISBN 0-86147-315-9.
- Collis, Rose (2010). The New Encyclopaedia of Brighton. (based on the original by Tim Carder) (1st ed.). Brighton: Brighton & Hove Libraries. ISBN 978-0-9564664-0-2.
- Musgrave, Clifford (1981). Life in Brighton. Rochester: Rochester Press. ISBN 0-571-09285-3.
- Nairn, Ian; Pevsner, Nikolaus (1965). The Buildings of England: Sussex. Harmondsworth: Penguin Books. ISBN 0-14-071028-0.
