= Gothic House =

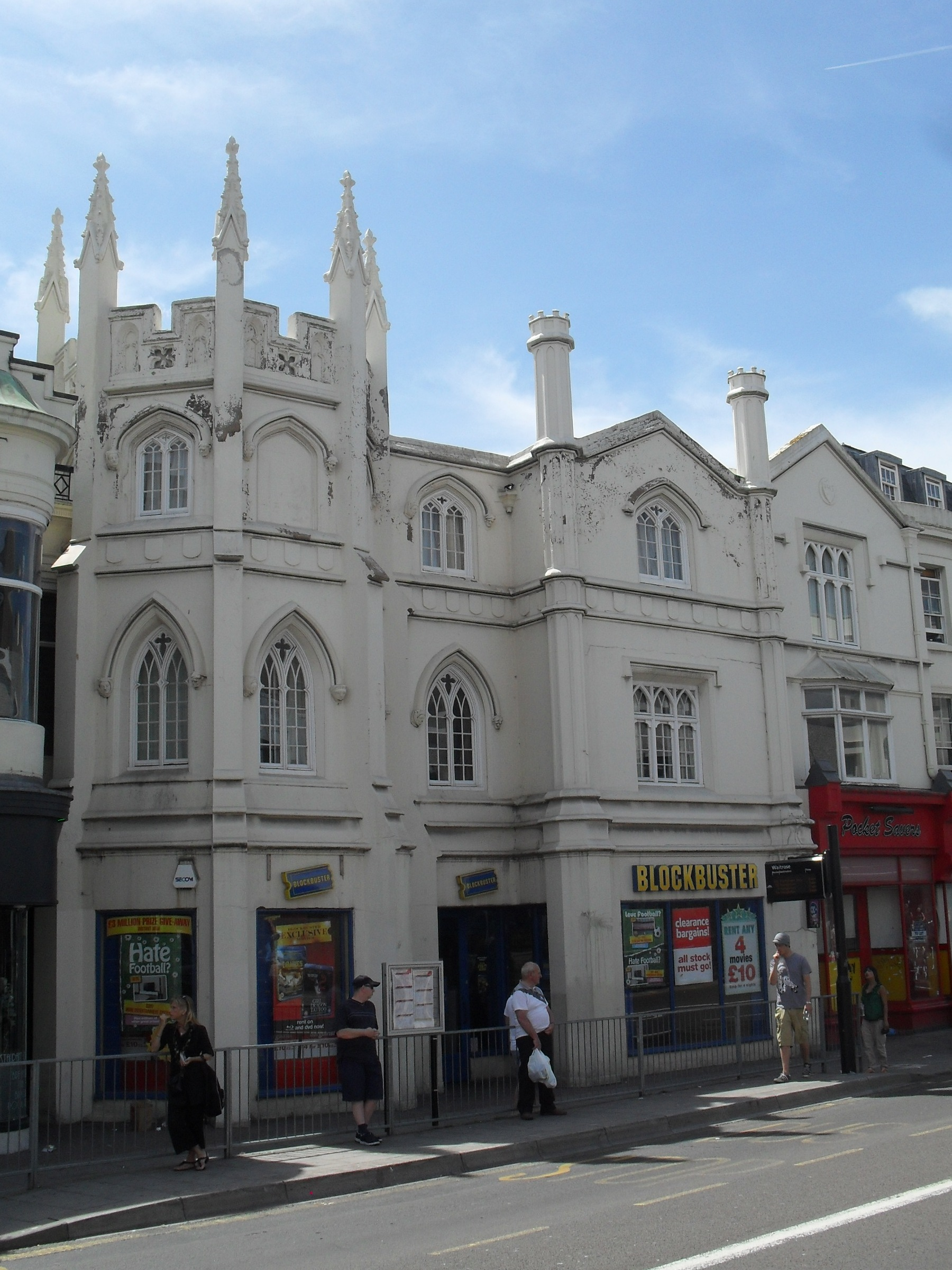
- The building from the northeast in 2010, when occupied by a Blockbuster store

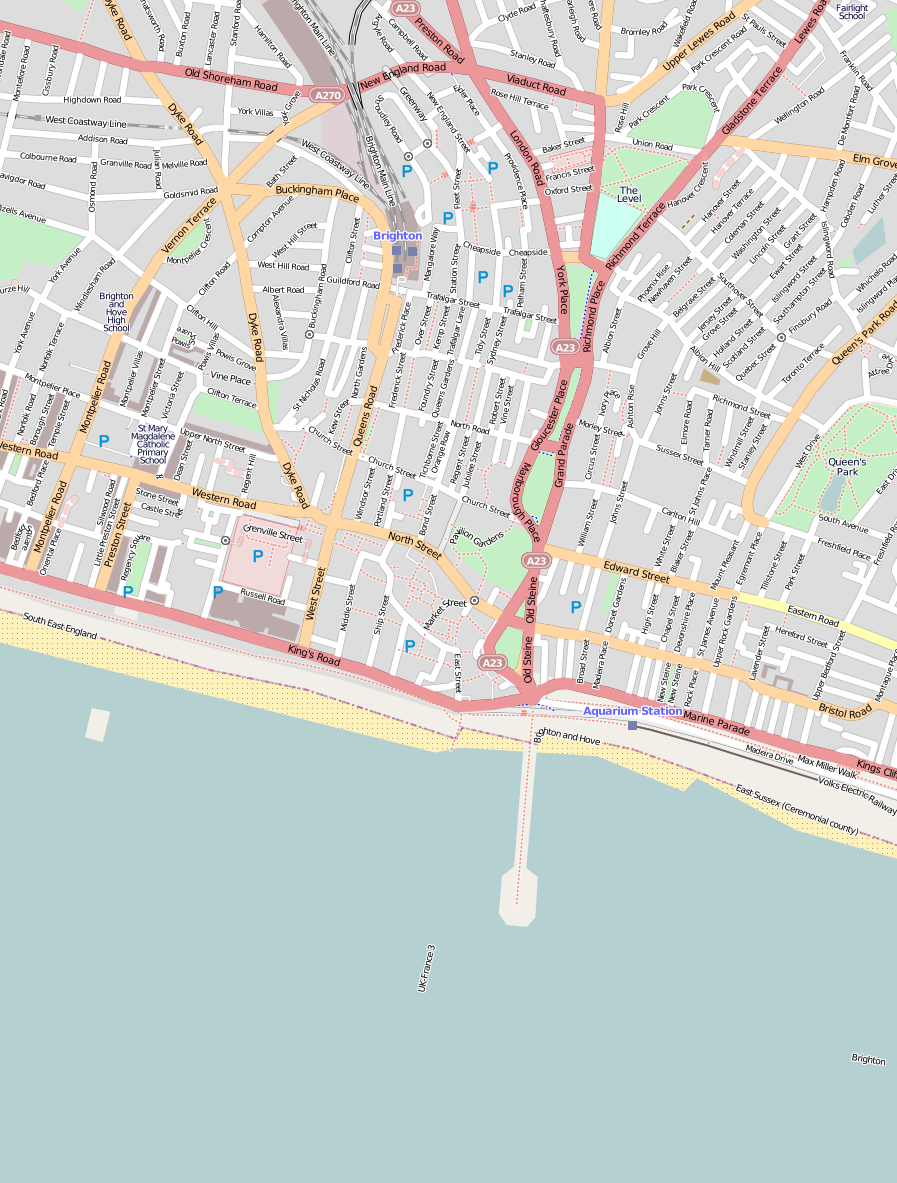
- Location within central Brighton Gothic House (England) Gothic House (the United Kingdom)
- 50.8246°N 0.1522°W
- Location: 95–96 Western Road, Brighton, Brighton and Hove BN1 2LB, United Kingdom

History
- Built: 1822–25

Site notes
- Architect(s): Amon Henry Wilds; Charles Busby
- Architectural style: Regency Gothic Revival/Strawberry Hill Gothic

Listed Building – Grade II
- Official name: Eastern part of Debenham's store and attached wall, 95 and 96 Western and 1, 2 and 3 Western Terrace
- Designated: 13 October 1952
- Reference no.: 1381101

Gothic House (later known as The Priory or Priory Lodge when still in residential use) is a Gothic-style building in the centre of Brighton, part of the English city of Brighton and Hove. Although it has been in commercial use for more than a century, it retains some of its original appearance as "one of the most fascinating houses" built by the prolific partnership of Amon Henry Wilds and Charles Busby. It is the only Gothic Revival building they are known to have designed: they typically adopted the Regency style, sometimes with Classical or Italianate touches. The building is Grade II listed.

== History ==
Amon Wilds and his son Amon Henry Wilds moved from Lewes to nearby Brighton in 1815 when it was a rapidly developing seaside resort. They had founded a building and architectural partnership nine years earlier. In 1822, Charles Busby—also an architect—came to Brighton and entered an informal partnership with the Wilds. They went on to become "the most influential and significant [team] in Brighton's architectural history" over the following decades.

Wilds junior set up his own company in around 1823, although he still worked with his father and Busby on some projects. One of these was their commission for a large Gothic-style house to be built on the south side of Western Road at the top of a new little street called Western Terrace. Western Road was originally a track running from Brighton to the neighbouring village of Hove, but large houses were built along it in the early 19th century until it was almost continuously built up as far as Montpelier Road, which led inland to the new suburb of Montpelier. It was finished in 1825 and was known either by the name Gothic House or by its original street address of 1 Western Terrace (it was the first building in that street, predating several others by Wilds such as Sillwood Hall and the Western Pavilion),

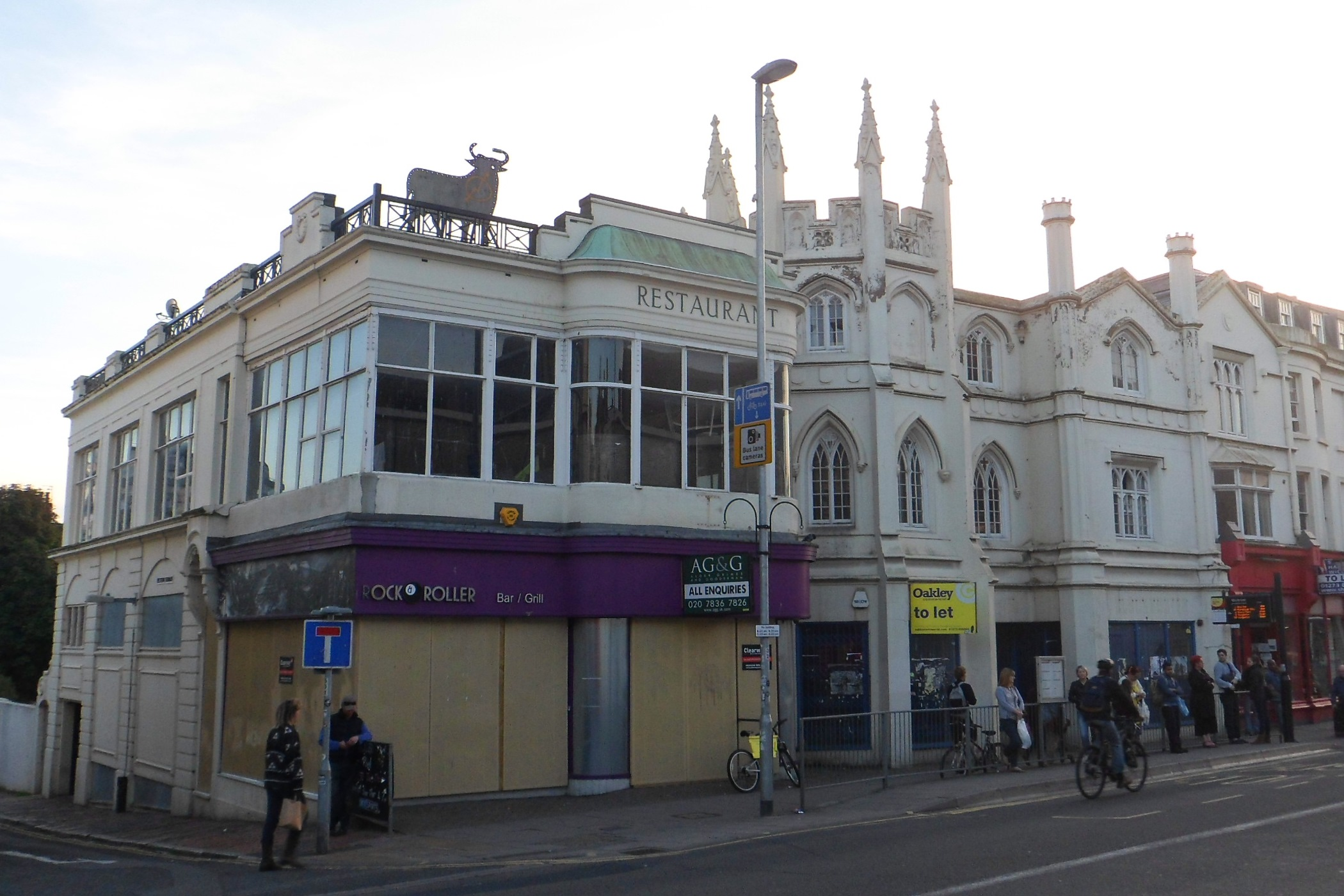
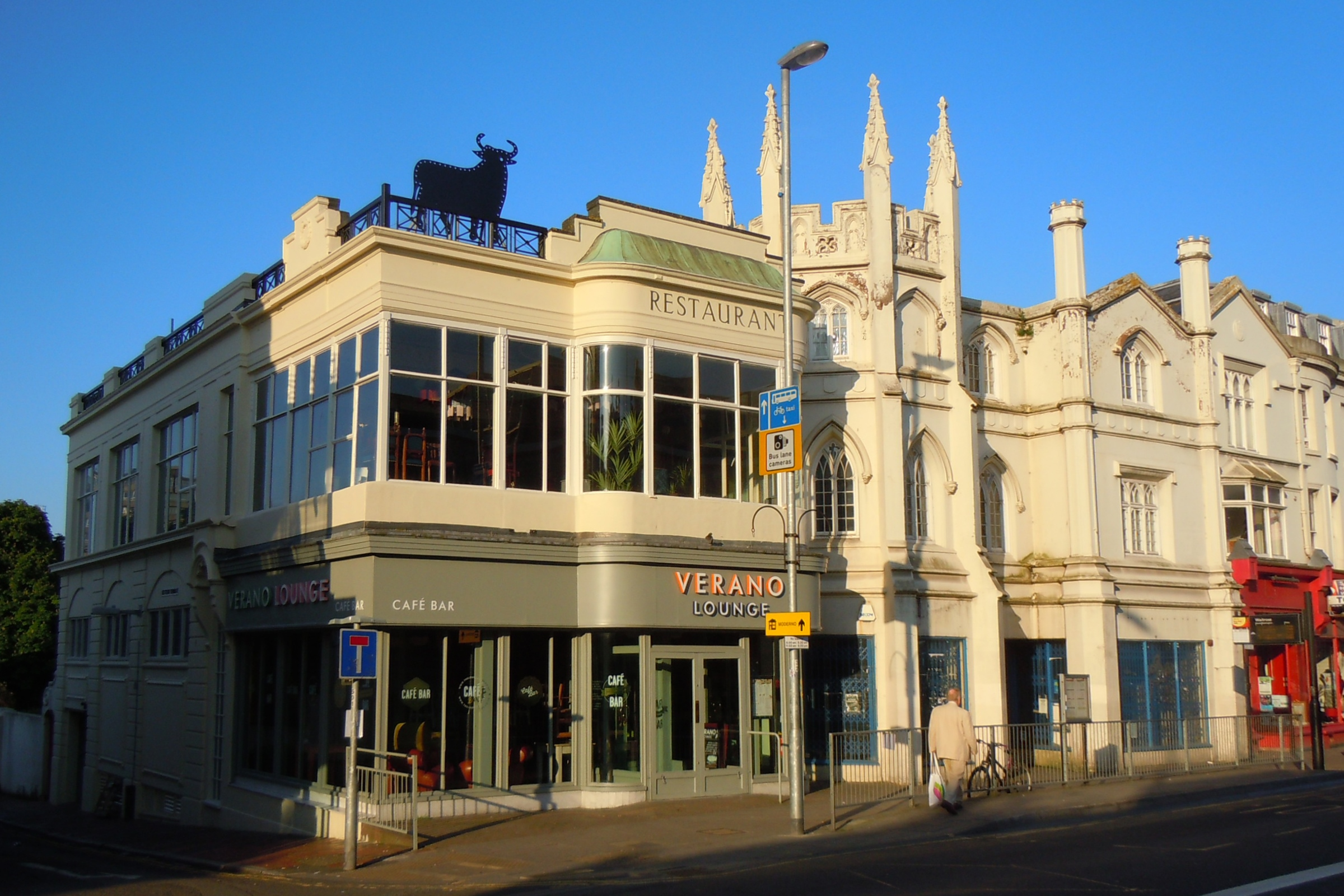
When pictured in October 2013 (left), the building housed a bar and a Blockbuster Video shop, both of which had closed down. By May 2014 (right), the Verano Lounge bar had opened in the eastern part.

Wilds originally lived at Western Pavilion, directly opposite Gothic House, but he is recorded at living at Gothic House (then named Priory Lodge) between 1843 and 1845. At some point after this it was divided internally into three houses. An early photograph shows the house with blank and pointed-arched windows at ground-floor level, set behind a low wall and with a tree next to it. Its appearance was altered in 1880 when it entered commercial use: W.H. Strevens, an auctioneer, redesigned the façade in a simpler interpretation of the Gothic Revival style and extended it westwards, taking in five adjacent houses. In 1898 it was further altered when Sharman's Drapery took over and converted the whole of the ground floor into a shop. The department store Plummer Roddis then bought the building in 1920 and extended the shopfront further west and to the south along Western Terrace. Henry Ward was responsible for this work. The house "[was] now the nucleus of their premises" and had been greatly altered: the whole ground floor had been removed and the plain Gothic-style addition of 1880 gave the appearance of being "grafted on". Plummer Roddis was taken over by Debenhams, and the building was still in their ownership in 1993. By 1998, the store had moved to new premises in the Churchill Square shopping centre and the building was split up into smaller shop units. Branches of the Blockbuster video rental shop and the Brighton-based independent supermarket Taj occupied the western part, and by 2001 Loch Fyne Restaurants operated a seafood restaurant in the unit on the corner of Western Terrace. After this closed, Spanish restaurant Pintxo People traded from the premises, but this in turn closed in February 2009. In February 2010, Brighton and Hove city council granted an alcohol licence for a new bar, and the Rock 'N' Roller American Restaurant and Pool Bar opened in April that year. This later closed down and was offered for sale on a leasehold basis. Meanwhile, Blockbuster went into administration in January 2013 and closed many stores, including this one. On 29 March 2014, the eastern section of the building (on the corner of Western Terrace) reopened as the Verano Lounge restaurant and bar. The sale and refurbishment cost £450,000. On 24 September 2016, the Verano Lounge closed and was put on the market.

The building was Grade II listed on 13 October 1952.

== Architecture ==
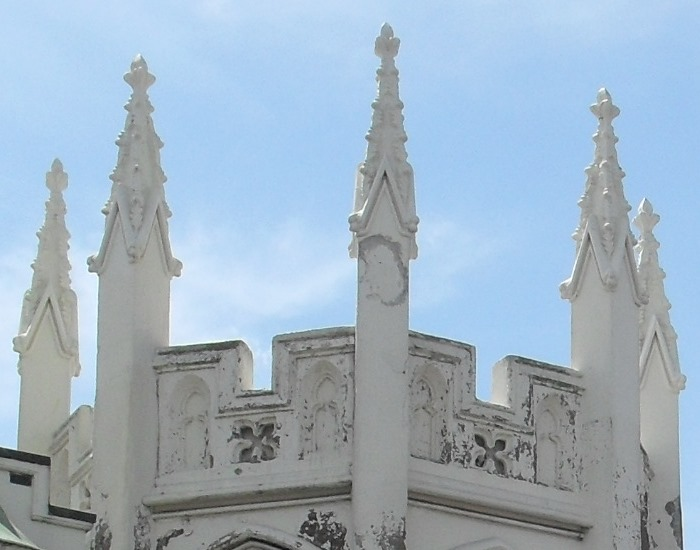
Ornate crocketted pinnacles adorn the roof of the tower.

Non-ecclesiastical Gothic-style buildings are rare in Brighton: the only other examples are Wykeham Terrace, the Percy and Wagner Almshouses on Lewes Road, and the former Brighton Forum (now Citibase Brighton; originally a teacher training college). (Wilds may have been commissioned to design Wykeham Terrace, but there is no definite proof of this). Wilds and Busby were accustomed to designing in various styles—their range in Brighton along encompasses Greek Revival, Classical, Regency, and Italianate, and Wilds tried a fusion of Oriental and Indo-Saracenic Revival styles for his own home at Western Pavilion, built in 1831. Gothic House is their only known commission in the Gothic style, though, and it is the only such design they actually executed. Although its date puts it at the beginning of the Gothic Revival period, "it is not early Gothic Revival but Gothick (i.e. Georgian Gothic)", a style also described as Regency Gothic. The only other Regency Gothic buildings in Brighton, the National Schools at Church Street in the North Laine, were demolished in 1971 for a road widening scheme which never happened. The design has been likened to the proto-Gothic of Strawberry Hill House (1749–1776) in London by local historian Antony Dale, who calls it "more realistic than [that] ... [but] the house could hardly lay claim to be called a serious Gothic construction". He instead describes it as an "experiment" by Wilds and Busby. The building has also been called "fanciful and irresponsibly Gothick".

The building's placement opposite the Western Pavilion "nicely illustrates the stylistic variation of the Regency period" and provided a clear contrast to its elaborate Oriental style, especially before it was converted for commercial use. Above the "mutilated" ground floor, the upper parts of the building are mostly unchanged from the original design: the hood-moulded windows have pointed arches and tracery, and the polygonal corner tower has a crocketted pinnacle at each corner. Buttresses rise from ground-floor level on this section. The shopfront added in 1920 by Henry Ward has two storeys and rounds the corner into Western Terrace, partly hiding the original structure.

== See also ==
- Grade II listed buildings in Brighton and Hove: E–H

== Bibliography ==
- Antram, Nicholas; Morrice, Richard (2008). Brighton and Hove. Pevsner Architectural Guides. London: Yale University Press. ISBN 978-0-300-12661-7.
- Beevers, David; Roles, John (1993). A Pictorial History of Brighton. Derby: The Breedon Books Publishing Company (for Royal Pavilion, Art Galleries and Museums, Brighton). ISBN 1-873626-54-1.
- Brighton Polytechnic. School of Architecture and Interior Design (1987). A Guide to the Buildings of Brighton. Macclesfield: McMillan Martin. ISBN 1-869865-03-0.
- Collis, Rose (2010). The New Encyclopaedia of Brighton. (based on the original by Tim Carder) (1st ed.). Brighton: Brighton & Hove Libraries. ISBN 978-0-9564664-0-2.
- Dale, Antony (1967) [1947]. Fashionable Brighton 1820–1860 (2nd ed.). Newcastle-upon-Tyne: Oriel Press Ltd. ISBN 0-85362-028-8.
- Dale, Antony; Gray, James S. (1976). Brighton Old and New. East Ardsley: EP Publishing. ISBN 0-7158-1188-6.
- Musgrave, Clifford (1981). Life in Brighton. Rochester: Rochester Press. ISBN 0-571-09285-3.
