= St Mary the Virgin, Brighton =

St Mary's Church, Kemptown, Brighton
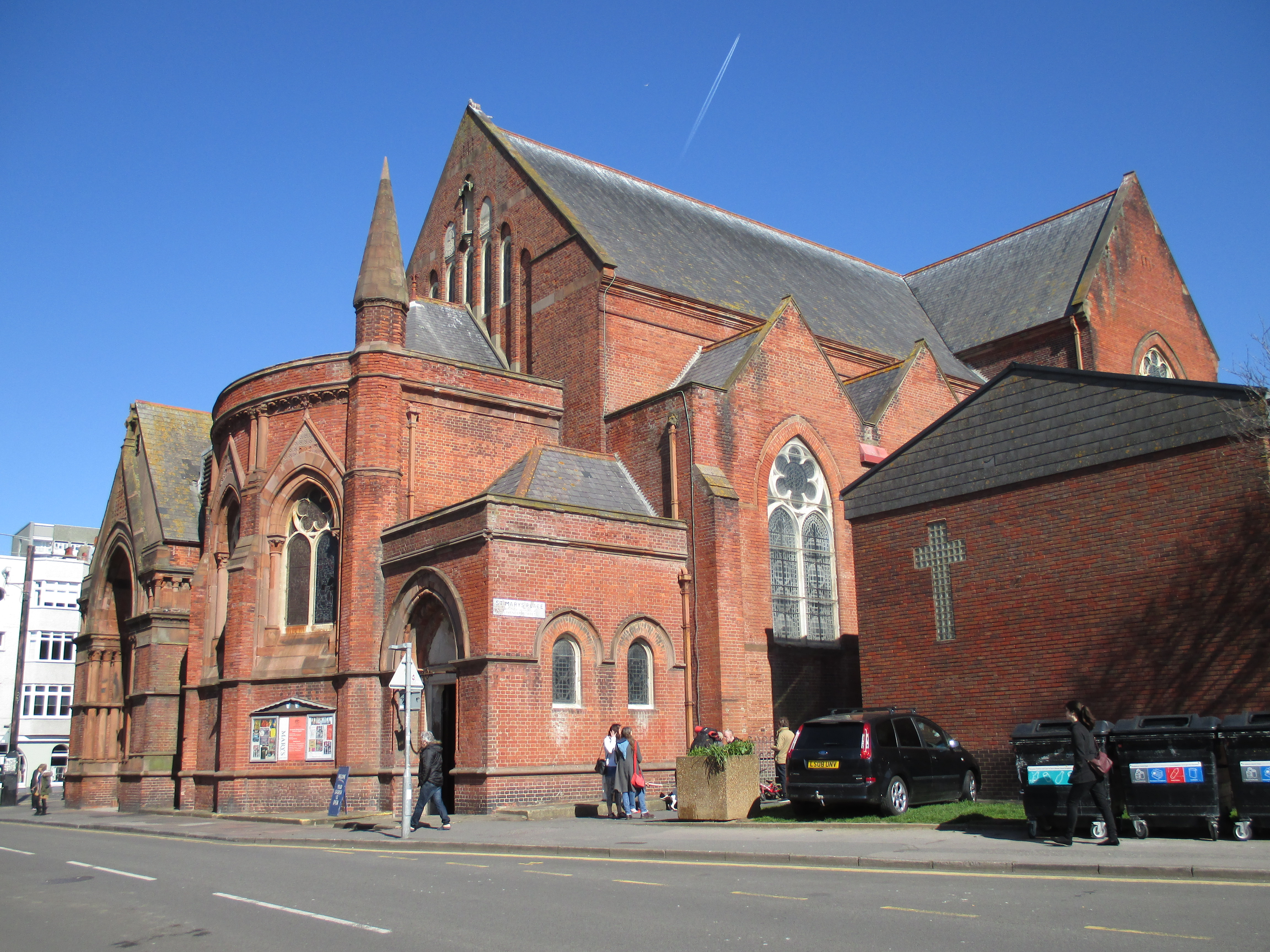
- The church from the southeast
- St Mary's Church, Kemptown, Brighton
- 50°49′13″N 0°7′46″W
- Location: St James's Street/Upper Rock Gardens, Kemptown, Brighton and Hove BN2 1PR
- Country: England
- Denomination: Anglican
- Website: www.stmaryschurchbrighton.org.uk/

History
- Status: Parish church
- Founded: 1826
- Founder: Charles Elliott
- Dedication: The Virgin Mary
- Dedicated: 18 January 1827
- Consecrated: 15 October 1878 (present building)
- Events: 1876: collapsed during reconstruction 1877: rebuilt in Early English style

Architecture
- Functional status: Active
- Heritage designation: Grade II*
- Designated: 20 August 1971
- Architect: William Emerson
- Style: Early English Gothic Revival
- Completed: 1878
- Construction cost: £10,000 (£914,000 in 2025)

Specifications
- Capacity: 1,000
- Height: 60 feet (18 m)
- Materials: Red brick

Administration
- Province: Canterbury
- Diocese: Chichester
- Archdeaconry: Chichester
- Deanery: Rural Deanery of Brighton
- Parish: Brighton, Kemp Town: St Mary

Clergy
- Priest: Revd Andrew Woodward

St Mary's Church is an Anglican church in the Kemptown area of Brighton, in the English city of Brighton and Hove. The present building dates from the late 1870s and replaced a church of the same name which suddenly collapsed while being renovated. The Gothic-style red-brick building, whose style resembles Early English revival and French Gothic revival, is now a Grade II* listed building, and remains in use despite threats of closure.

== History ==
Brighton's increasing popularity in the early 19th century, especially among high society, encouraged wealthy people to build proprietary chapels—private churches with no parish but with an Anglican minister. The original St Mary's was one of four such chapels built in the 1820s. Acts of Parliament were granted to people wishing to build proprietary chapels. Barnard Gregory had obtained such an Act in 1825 to allow him to build St Margaret's Church in Cannon Place in central Brighton; the same Act permitted him to build one in St James's Street, a road running eastwards from the town and developed in the 1790s. In 1826 he sold this right to Charles Elliott, a merchant who divided his time between London and Brighton. Elliott was a member of the Clapham Sect, a group of Anglican social reformers which included William Wilberforce; one of his daughters, Charlotte, became a well-known hymnwriter; and the wider Elliott family were influential in Brighton's religious life for much of the 19th century.

The 3rd Earl of Egremont, who lived on the Petworth House estate in West Sussex, also owned East Lodge, whose grounds extended down to St James's Street. He donated some of his land to Gregory to allow him to build a church. Gregory commissioned Amon Henry Wilds, a leading architect in Regency-era Brighton, to design it. Wilds adopted the then-fashionable Neoclassical style for his design, and created a temple-style structure which bore some resemblance to the Brighton Unitarian Church which he had built six years earlier. That building was inspired by the appearance of the Temple of Thesæus in Athens, and Wilds based St Mary's design on another Ancient Greek edifice, the Temple of Nemesis. a The Act of Parliament relating to the proprietary chapel allowed the owner to appoint a curate for 40 years on a stipend of £150 per year (equivalent to £12,900 in 2025, based on 1826 prices). Charles Elliott appointed his eldest son, Henry Venn Elliott, as the first curate of St Mary's Chapel in August 1826, when he purchased the half-finished building from Gregory. Henry had been ordained as a priest in 1824 after spending a year as a deacon, and initially held the curacy of a rural parish in Suffolk.

The Bishop of Chichester, Robert James Carr, consecrated the church on 18 January 1827. It had cost about £10,000 (£914,000 in 2025), five times more than the contract price. The stuccoed exterior featured four large Doric columns beneath a frieze and pediment. The side walls had sash windows. Inside, there were galleries on three sides; one gallery had a private pew for the Earl of Egremont. The capacity was 947, and 240 free pews were offered at a time when pew-rents were the norm (and helped to pay for Henry Venn Elliott's stipend).

Elliott served as the curate of the church until his death in 1865. His brother-in-law took over temporarily until Julius Marshall Elliott, Henry Venn Elliott's youngest son, was ordained and took up the position. In 1873, St Mary's became a parish church for the first time when Brighton's parishes and ecclesiastical districts were reorganised. The ownership of the building transferred from the Elliott family to the Ecclesiastical Commissioners, and all pews became rent-free. By this time, the church was in a dilapidated condition; in June 1876, just as some money had been set aside for reconstruction, and initial repairs were being carried out, the chancel walls caved in, the roof fell inwards and the building collapsed. Instead of trying to repair the ruin, it was decided that a new church should be built in the Gothic style which was by that time the most popular design for ecclesiastical buildings in England. Future President of the RIBA Sir William Emerson, who until then had worked almost exclusively on architectural commissions in India, was asked to design the new building.

The congregation worshipped in the Royal Pavilion while Emerson's building took shape. Its foundation stone was laid on 29 May 1877. The church took two years to complete and cost £15,231 (£1.51 million in 2025), about 25% more than expected. A building firm based in nearby Hove were responsible for the construction. Richard Durnford, the new Bishop of Chichester, dedicated the new church on 15 October 1878.

St Mary's parish was extended in 1948 when the nearby St James's Church closed, and when it was demolished in 1975 some memorials and fixtures were moved. St Mary's Church itself then came under threat of closure, after the Diocese of Chichester carried out a review of Anglican churches in the city of Brighton and Hove between 2002 and 2003. Its report, published in June 2003, noted that the building needed significant maintenance work, the congregation was relatively small and unable to make the church financially viable, and the nearby St George's Church had become the de facto parish church of the Kemptown area. As a result, it recommended either complete closure or the use of most of the building for a community project in conjunction with Brighton and Hove City Council, leaving space for a small Anglican chapel to be created. Since the report was published, however, no closure plans have been submitted, and the church is still open and continues to offer regular services.

== Architecture ==
The design of St Mary's Church has been described as Early English Gothic Revival, "Neo-Gothic" and French Gothic Revival; most sources prefer the latter. It was built of red brick in Flemish bond with some external sandstone and terracotta dressings and Bath stonework inside. There is a chancel with a pentagonal apse and an ambulatory, transepts, an extremely long four-bay nave with aisles on both sides and spanned by large arches, a semicircular baptistery (next to which a tower was planned to be built; it was never completed and only a stump exists), two entrance porches—one of which is set into the base of the tower stump—an organ chamber and two vestries. The nave is on two levels, and the higher level forms the baptistery; a similar sunken nave exists at St Martin's Church, another Brighton church of the 1870s. The apse and organ chamber have lancet windows on each side, while the transepts have larger windows with sexfoils (six-lobed heads).

== The church today ==
St Mary's Church was listed at Grade II* on 20 August 1971. In February 2001, it was one of 70 Grade II*-listed buildings and structures, and 1,218 listed buildings of all grades, in the city of Brighton and Hove.

The parish covers an area of Brighton just behind the seafront and immediately east of the centre. The boundaries are the seafront, Old Steine, White Street, Sussex Street, the top of Queen's Park, Sutherland Road and Bedford Street.

== See also ==
- Grade II* listed buildings in Brighton and Hove
- List of places of worship in Brighton and Hove

== Bibliography ==
- Carder, Timothy (1990). The Encyclopaedia of Brighton. Lewes: East Sussex County Libraries. ISBN 0-86147-315-9.
- Dale, Antony (1989). Brighton Churches. London: Routledge. ISBN 0-415-00863-8.
- Elleray, D. Robert (1981). The Victorian Churches of Sussex. Chichester: Phillimore & Co. ISBN 0-85033-378-4.
- Elleray, D. Robert (2004). Sussex Places of Worship. Worthing: Optimus Books. ISBN 0-9533132-7-1.
- Nairn, Ian; Pevsner, Nikolaus (1965). The Buildings of England: Sussex. Harmondsworth: Penguin Books. ISBN 0-14-071028-0.
