= Western Pavilion =

Western Pavilion Brighton
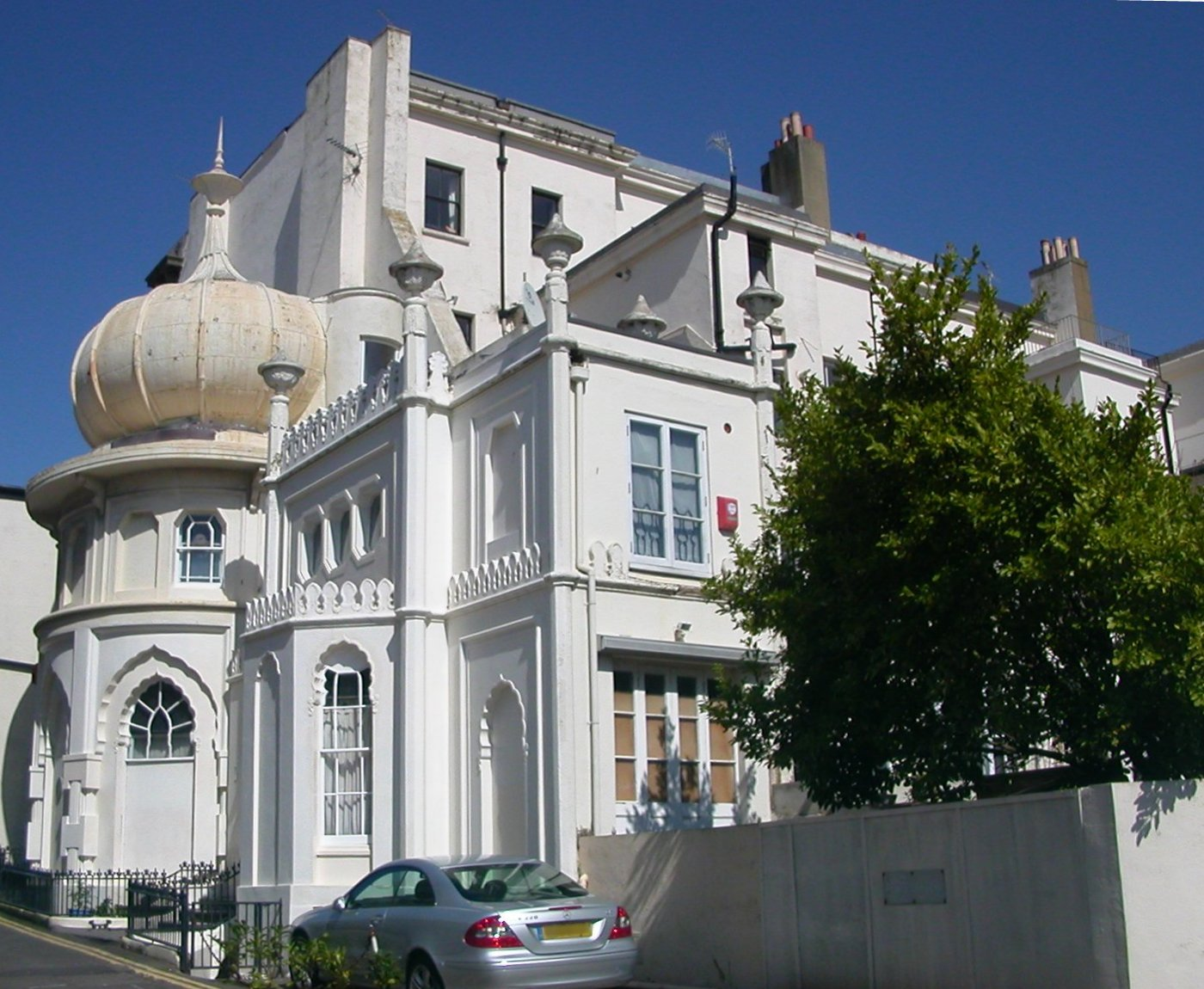
- The building from the southwest

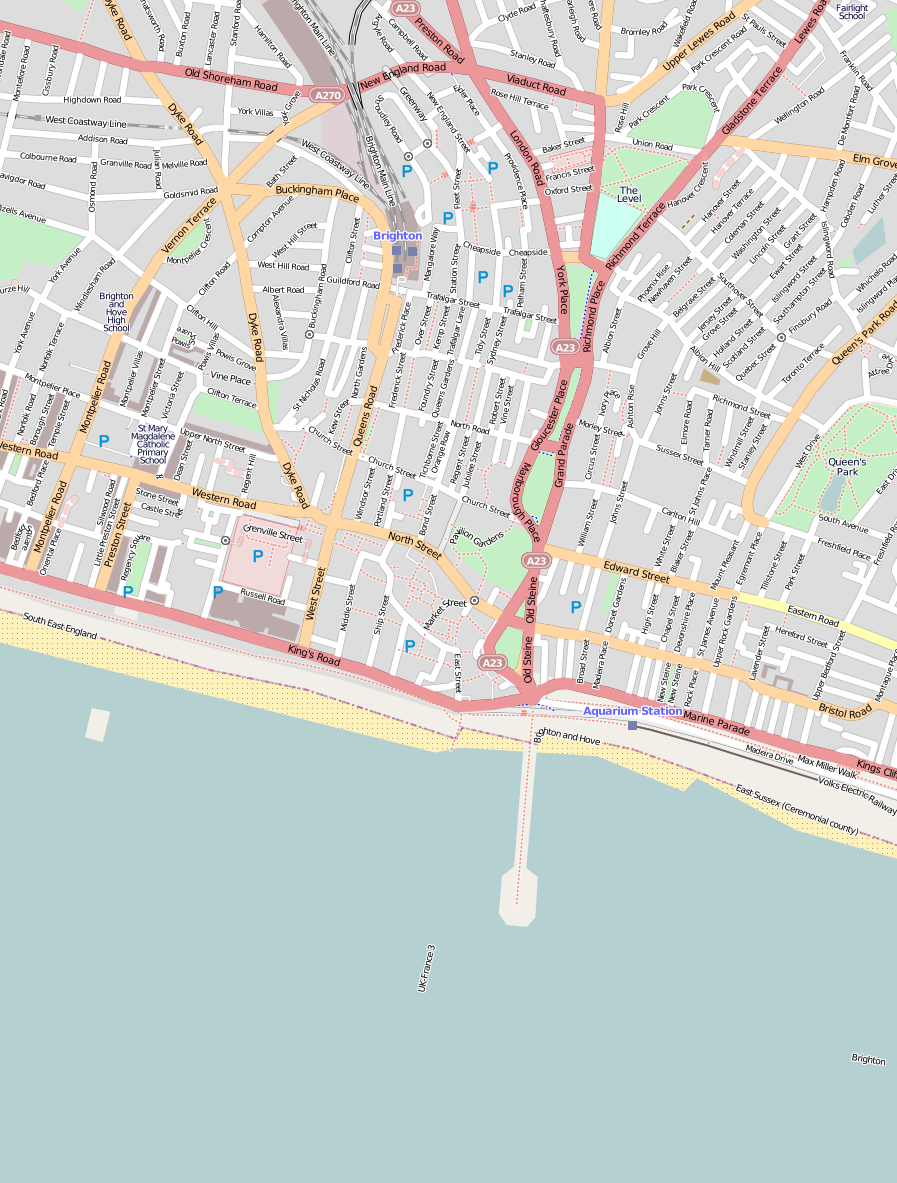
- Location within central Brighton
- 50.8246°N 0.1519°W
- Location: 9 Western Terrace, Brighton, Brighton and Hove, East Sussex BN1 2LD, United Kingdom

History
- Built: 1827–1828
- Built for: Amon Henry Wilds

Site notes
- Architect: Amon Henry Wilds
- Architectural style: Hindoo/Indo-Saracenic

Listed Building – Grade II*
- Official name: The Western Pavilion
- Designated: 13 October 1952
- Reference no.: 1381108

The Western Pavilion is an exotically designed early 19th-century house in the centre of Brighton, part of the English city of Brighton and Hove. Local architect Amon Henry Wilds, one of the most important figures in Brighton's development from modest fishing village to fashionable seaside resort, built the distinctive two-storey house between 1827 and 1828 as his own residence, and incorporated many inventive details while paying homage to the Royal Pavilion, Brighton's most famous and distinctive building. Although the house has been altered and a shopfront inserted, it is still in residential use, and has been listed at Grade II* by English Heritage for its architectural and historical importance.

== History ==
Amon Henry Wilds, his father, Amon Wilds, and another architect, Charles Busby, went into partnership early in the 19th century, and quickly became Brighton's most important firm of architects. When the Wildses moved from nearby Lewes to Brighton in about 1814, the latter's transformation from small, declining fishing village to fashionable, high-class seaside and leisure resort had already started; but the three architects jointly and individually led the town through its period of greatest success, when they established their trademark Regency architectural style in a succession of major residential developments. They designed a wide variety of religious and secular buildings of all types as well, and Amon Henry Wilds was also involved in engineering projects.

Amon Henry Wilds was prolific throughout the 1820s, and after 1822 he increasingly worked on his own. In 1827, he was commissioned to build a mansion for Sir David Scott, 2nd Baronet, on the south side of Western Road—the main route from Brighton to the Brunswick Town estate and Hove. Sillwood House, named after Scott's Berkshire residence of Silwood Park [sic], was ready in 1828. In 1824 on land next to the would-be mansion, Wilds developed a small terrace of five houses called Western Terrace and for a time resided in the central house (now No.6). These five houses are in the Neoclassical style with stucco and columns. The restoration of No.6 won the Design Award of 1992. Beyond these, the terrace incorporated the mansion's coach house and at its north end Wilds built his own house in a different style again.

The Western Pavilion, as it became known, was intended to resemble the Royal Pavilion, the elaborate and opulent Orientalist/Indo-Saracenic royal palace which has become Brighton's best-known building. Wilds placed a leaded onion dome on the northwest corner (and inserted a bathroom shaped like an igloo); minarets, Oriental-style windows and various Hindoo-style details predominate elsewhere. Many rooms, including the dining room, were oval.

Wilds died in 1857, and in 1931 the Western Pavilion was converted into an office. In 1957, a shop took it over, and refronted the north façade (facing Western Road) with two-storey windows. A shopfront still stands in front of the building on Western Road, but the Western Pavilion is now in residential use again. It was listed at Grade II* on 13 October 1952; such buildings are defined as being "particularly important ... [and] of more than special interest". As of February 2001, it was one of 70 Grade II*-listed buildings and structures, and 1,218 listed buildings of all grades, in the city of Brighton and Hove.

== Architecture ==
Descriptions of the Western Pavilion's architecture focus on its similarity to the Royal Pavilion: it has been called that building's "baby brother" (and, similarly, a "miniature version" of it), and one historian has observed that some people have incorrectly believed the house was used as a pied-à-terre by the Prince Regent, where he could take his lover Maria Fitzherbert away from the Royal Pavilion. The eclectic style "reveals Wilds's humour and his willingness to embrace the exotic": it combines the Hindoo, Orientalist and Indo-Saracenic styles. The large leaded (now painted) onion dome is an Orientalist touch; the repeated cusped-headed arches on the exterior are of Indo-Saracenic origin; and there are small minarets of the Hindoo type.

The house has two storeys and a basement, and presents a two-bay façade westwards to Western Terrace. The entrance is on this side, projecting further forward than the upper storey, under a cusped archway below a parapet with an Oriental-style balustrade. The left (northern) bay on the west façade is almost circular and has two glazed windows and a blank window in cusped-headed recessed arches. Between each arch is a pilaster. Simpler windows, some of which are blank, are on the first floor, below large eaves and the dome. The main part of the house is in two slightly staggered parts. Columns rise at the corners of the walls and terminate in minaret-shaped finials.

== See also ==
- Grade II* listed buildings in Brighton and Hove
