= Thomas Busby (composer) =

English composer (1755–1838)

- Born: 26 December 1754; Westminster, England
- Died: 28 May 1838; Pentonville, England
- Occupation: Composer

Thomas Busby (26 December 1755 – 28 May 1838) was an English composer.

== Early life ==
Busby was the son of a coach-painter. He was born at Westminster, London, in December 1755. His father was musical, and sang himself; when his son developed a fine treble voice, he decided to bring him up as a musician. Benjamin Cooke, the organist of Westminster Abbey, turned down young Busby (at age 12-13) as too old for a chorister; he was placed under Samuel Champness for singing, and Charles Knyvett for the harpsichord. Subsequently he studied under Jonathan Battishill.

In the summer of 1769 Busby was engaged to sing at Vauxhall Gardens at a salary of ten guineas a week. On his voice breaking, he was articled to Battishill for three years, and worked on both his musical and his general education. On the expiration of his training he returned to his father's house, and set himself to earn his living by music and literature.

== Early works ==
His first venture was the composition of music to a play by William Kenrick, The Man the Master, but this was never finished. He then turned his attention to oratorio, and began a setting of Alexander Pope's Messiah, at which he worked intermittently for several years. Busby was more successful with literary pursuits than with musical. He was for some time parliamentary reporter of the London Courant, and assisted in editing The Morning Post, besides acting as musical critic to the European Magazine and Joseph Johnson's Analytical Review, and contributing to the Celtic Miscellany and Whitehall Evening Post. In 1785 he wrote a poem called The Age of Genius, a satire in the style of Charles Churchill, containing nearly 1,000 lines. About five years after the expiration of his articles Busby was elected organist of St Mary's, Newington.

== Marriage and later years ==
In July 1786 he married Priscilla Angier, daughter of Charles Angier of Earl's Court, Kensington. Together they had seven children, including George Frederic, architect Charles Augustin, and Julian (also a composer and musician). After his marriage Busby lived in Poland Street, where he was sought after as a teacher of Latin, French, and music. A few years later he moved to Battersea. In 1798 he was elected organist of St Mary Woolnoth.

In the spring of 1799, his early oratorio was produced by Wilhelm Cramer under the name of The Prophecy, perhaps to avoid comparison with Georg Handel's Messiah. Busby then set to work on settings of Thomas Gray's Progress of Poesy, Pope's "Ode on St. Cecilia's Day", and a cantata from Ossian, Comala; however, it is not clear whether any of these were performed. A secular "oratorio", Britannia (words by John Gretton), was sung at Covent Garden in 1801 with Gertrud Elisabeth Mara as the principal soprano. Busby also wrote music for Richard Cumberland's version of Kotzebue's Joanna, which was produced at Covent Garden on 16 January 1800, without much success.

In June 1801, Busby obtained the degree of Mus. Doc. at Cambridge, for which purpose he entered at Magdalene College. His exercise on this occasion was "A Thanksgiving Ode on the Naval Victories", the words of which were written by Mrs Crespigny. In 1802 he wrote music to Thomas Holcroft's melodrama A Tale of Mystery, the first play of this type that appeared on the English stage. It was produced at Covent Garden on 13 November 1802, and was very successful. In the following year Busby wrote music for Anna Maria Porter's musical entertainment The Fair Fugitives (Covent Garden, 16 May 1803); but this was a failure. His connection with the stage ceased with Matthew Lewis's Rugantino (Covent Garden, 18 October 1805). The music to all these plays was published.

== Final years ==
In his latter years Busby lived with a married daughter at Queen's Row, Pentonville, where he died, aged 84, on Monday, 28 May 1838. According to an obituary notice of him. he was eccentric and held "loose notions on religious subjects". George Borrow is said to have portrayed Busby as the editor of the "Universal Review" in his novel Lavengro (1851).

== Publications ==
In 1786 Busby and Samuel Arnold brought out a Musical Dictionary. Busby went on to issue a serial entitled The Divine Harmonist, consisting of 12 folio numbers of music, partly selected and partly original. In this work are included some fragments of his oratorio The Creation. The Divine Harmonist was followed by Melodia Britannica, which was to be a collection of English music, but the work was unsuccessful, and was never completed. About the same time Busby completed a translation of Lucretius into rhymed verse. Around 1800 he brought out A New and Complete Musical Dictionary, and started the first musical periodical in England, The Monthly Musical Journal, of which four numbers were produced.

His translation of Lucretius was published in 1813, and was followed by an attempt to prove that the Letters of Junius were written by J. L. de Lolme (1816), and subsequent publications such as A Grammar of Music (1818), A Dictionary of Musical Terms, A History of Music (two volumes, 1819) (a compilation from the Histories of Charles Burney and Sir John Hawkins), Concert-room Anecdotes (three volumes, 1825), and a Musical Manual (1828).
