= Brighton Unitarian Church =

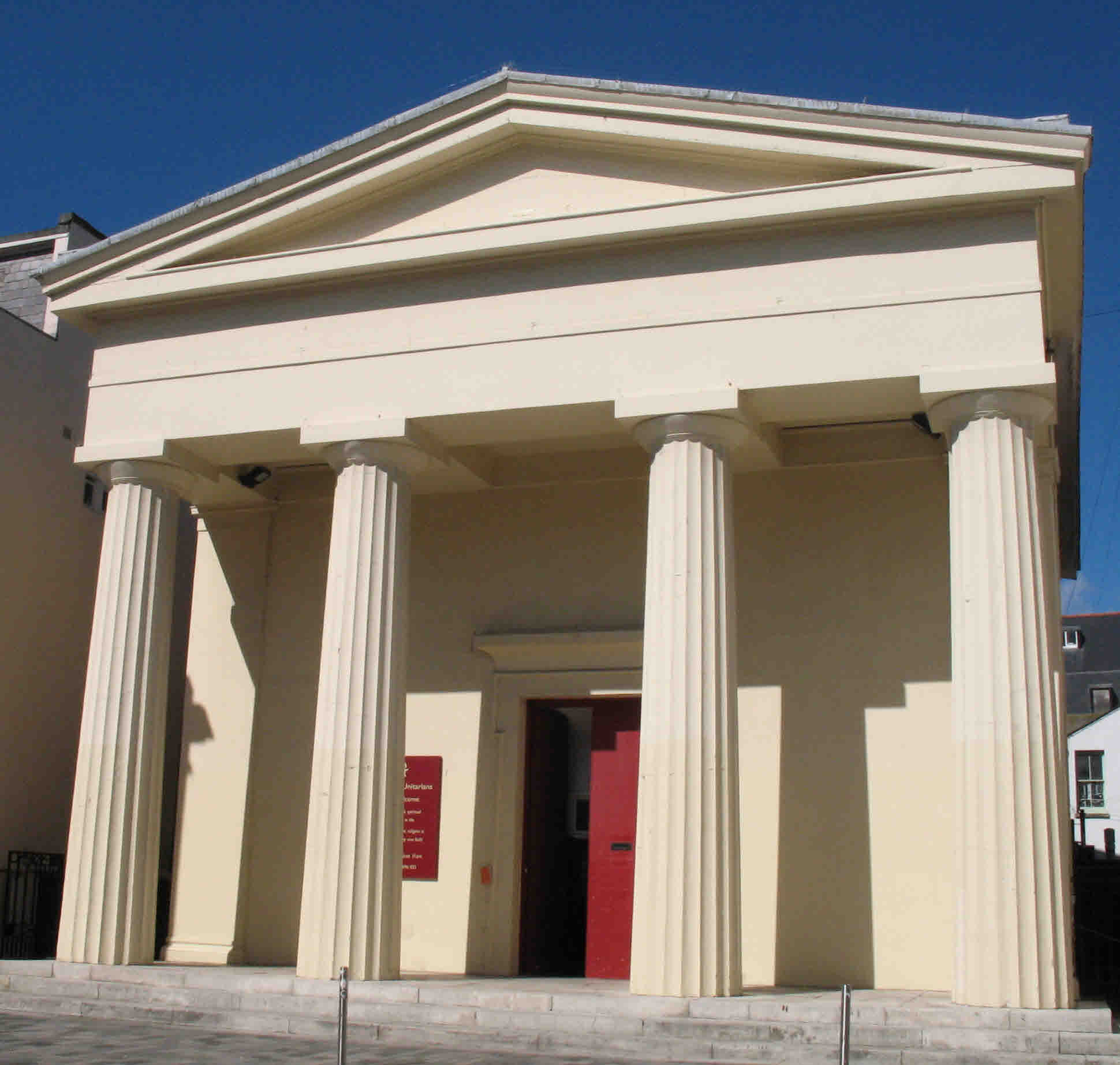
- Brighton Unitarian Church
- 50°49′26″N 0°8′22″W
- Location: New Road, Brighton, Brighton and Hove, East Sussex
- Country: England
- Denomination: General Assembly of Unitarian and Free Christian Churches
- Website: brightonunitarian.org.uk

History
- Former name: Christ Church
- Status: Chapel
- Founded: August 20, 1820
- Founder: John Chatfield

Architecture
- Functional status: Active
- Heritage designation: Grade II
- Designated: 13 October 1952
- Architect: Amon Henry Wilds
- Style: Greek Revival
- Completed: 20 August 1820

Specifications
- Capacity: 100

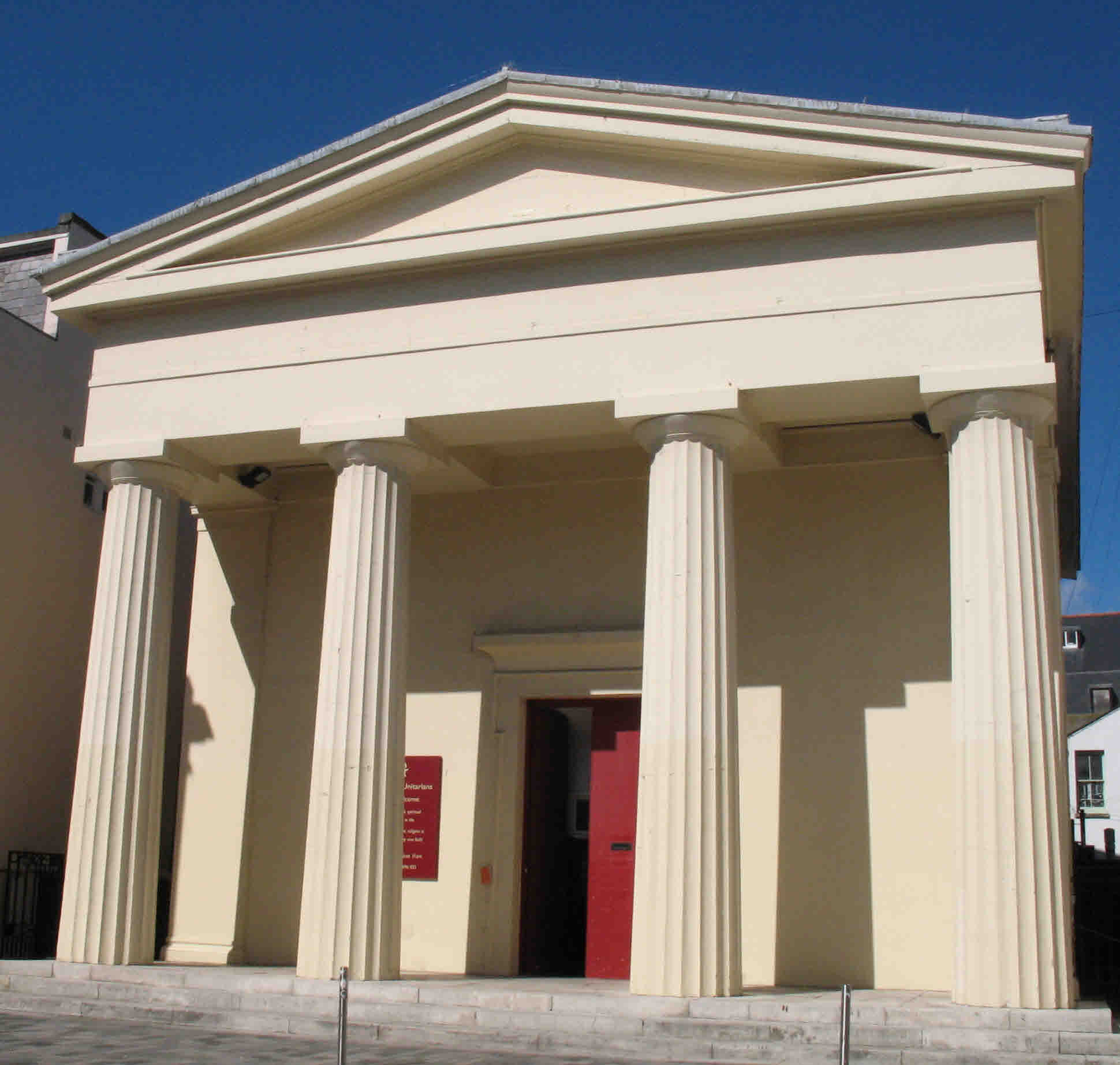
Exterior of the church

The Brighton Unitarian Church, previously known as Christ Church, is a Unitarian chapel in Brighton, England. Built in 1820 by prolific local architect Amon Henry Wilds on land sold to the fledgling Unitarian community by the Prince Regent, the stuccoed Greek Revival building occupies a prominent position near the corner of Church Road and New Road in the centre of Brighton, near the Royal Pavilion and the city's main theatres. It has had Grade II listed status since 1952. It is a member of the General Assembly of Unitarian and Free Christian Churches, the umbrella organisation for British Unitarians.

== History ==
Brighton in the late eighteenth century was turning from a fishing village to a fashionable resort, largely because of the patronage of the Prince Regent. New Road, as it is now known, was built on his instructions. The main north-south road leading out of the old town ran next to the Royal Pavilion, where he lived; noise and traffic disturbed him and made access to his stables difficult. He asked the architect of his stables to build a new road further to the west, and closed the original route. New Road was pedestrianised in 2007.

A congregation of Baptists with Calvinist views had been established in Brighton since the 18th century. A rift developed from 1791, when William Stevens, a newcomer, introduced Universalist views. In 1793 or 1795, Stevens and 18 others (including the original pastor) were expelled. From 1797, a small but steadily growing congregation met at Stevens' house; by 1806 they had moved to a small chapel in Jew Street, near the Baptists' meeting place in Bond Street. A Unitarian missionary popularised the theology among the congregation, and assistance from the leader of the Unitarian community in nearby Ditchling, John Chatfield, enabled a meeting room to be bought. This opened in 1812.

When the Prince sold the land he owned west of New Road, the congregation paid £650 for a plot on which a new chapel could be built. Chatfield, who also made all the arrangements, donated £200. Architect Amon Henry Wilds, whose career in Brighton was just beginning, designed the stuccoed, temple-style building on the instruction of Dr Morell, a classical scholar who became the first minister at the chapel.

The church was full to its 350 capacity on its opening date of 20 August 1820. After several changes of name, it has been known as the Brighton Unitarian Church since the 1940s. Now with a reduced capacity of 100, there is a weekly Sunday service. Rebuilding and refurbishment work was carried out in 1936, 1966 and 2004. The roof had to be repaired after it was damaged in the Great Storm of 1987.

The church is licensed for worship in accordance with the Places of Worship Registration Act 1855 and has the registration number 9189.

== Architecture ==
The building's design reflects the Temple of Thesæus in Athens. The east-facing entrance is a tetrastyle portico: four Doric columns surmounted by an entablature and pediment. Ancient Greek writing quoting the letter of St Paul to the Romans — "To God only wise, be glory through Jesus Christ" (Rom 16:27) — originally featured on the pediment, but it was removed later in the 19th century to prevent confusion: some even believed the writing was Hebrew and the building a synagogue. The building is of brick, but the frontage is stuccoed.

The church was listed at Grade II by English Heritage on 13 October 1952. It is one of 1,124 Grade II-listed buildings and structures, and 1,218 listed buildings of all grades, in the city of Brighton and Hove.

== See also ==
- Grade II listed buildings in Brighton and Hove: A–B
- List of places of worship in Brighton and Hove

== Bibliography ==
- Brighton Polytechnic. School of Architecture and Interior Design (1987). A Guide to the Buildings of Brighton. Macclesfield: McMillan Martin. ISBN 1-869-86503-0.
- Carder, Timothy (1990). The Encyclopaedia of Brighton. Lewes: East Sussex County Libraries. ISBN 0-86147-315-9.
- Dale, Antony (1989). Brighton Churches. London: Routledge. ISBN 0-415-00863-8.
- Nairn, Ian; Pevsner, Nikolaus (1965). The Buildings of England: Sussex. Harmondsworth: Penguin Books. ISBN 0-14-071028-0.
