= Amon Henry Wilds =

English architect

- Born: 1784 or 1790
- Died: 13 July 1857; Shoreham-by-Sea, England
- Occupation: Architect
- Buildings: Brighton Unitarian Church; Gothic House, Brighton; Park Crescent, Brighton; Park Crescent, Worthing; St Mary the Virgin Church, Brighton; Royal Albion Hotel; Western Pavilion; Wykeham Terrace (attr.)
- Projects: Regency Square; Kemp Town; Brunswick estate; Montpelier Crescent; Anthaeum (destroyed)

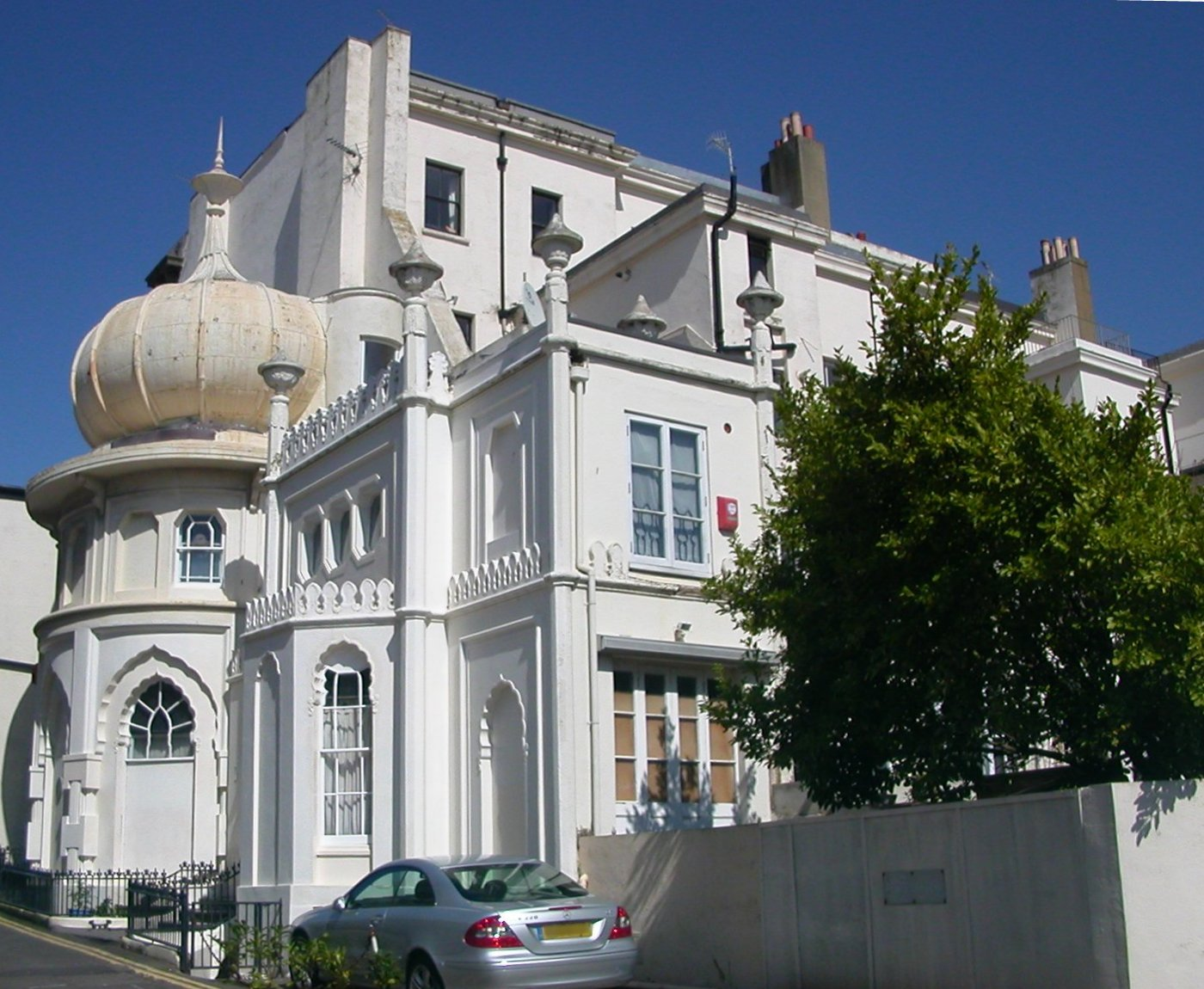
The Western Pavilion, built by Amon Henry Wilds as his Brighton home

Amon Henry Wilds (1784 or 1790 – 13 July 1857) was an English architect. He was part of a team of three architects and builders who—working together or independently at different times—were almost solely responsible for a surge in residential construction and development in early 19th-century Brighton, which until then had been a small but increasingly fashionable seaside resort on the East Sussex coast. In the 1820s, when Wilds, his father Amon Wilds (Note: In this article, Amon Henry Wilds is referred to as Wilds junior and his father Amon Wilds as Wilds senior.) and Charles Busby were at their most active, nearly 4,000 new houses were built, along with many hotels, churches and venues for socialising; most of these still survive, giving Brighton a distinctive Regency-era character, and many are listed buildings.

== Life and activities ==
Amon Henry Wilds was born to Amon Wilds and Sarah Dunn, and was baptised at All Saints Church, Lewes on 4 November 1790. Some sources give his birth year as 1784, but others consider 1790 more likely. At this time, Wilds senior's profession was listed as "carpenter and builder". In around 1806, the father and son established an architectural and building partnership in Lewes, but in 1815 they moved to Brighton, which was experiencing rapid growth; they carried out work in both places for the next five years until they moved permanently to Brighton in 1820. Their early work in the town, preceding their relocation, included Richmond Terrace and Waterloo Place. Wilds junior was chiefly responsible for these speculative developments.

In 1818, Wilds junior took independent responsibility for a design scheme for the first time: he submitted a design for a new road to connect the ancient Middle Street and West Street. By 1821, the scope of the project had been extended, and Wilds junior ended up supervising the construction of a raised promenade and sea-wall all the way from West Street to East Street, providing a direct east–west link across the town via the seafront for the first time. It was built between 1821 and 1822 and opened by King George IV on 29 January 1822. Named King's Road, it became the town's most important promenading and horse-riding route, and is still a major road. Around the same time, Wilds junior was commissioned to design and build Brighton Unitarian Church for the town's recently established Unitarian community; he laid the foundation stone in 1819 and completed the building the next year.

Charles Busby arrived in Brighton in 1822 and formed a loose partnership with the Wilds. Proving who was responsible for particular buildings or projects is difficult and sometimes contradictory because many designs were signed "Wilds and Busby", the three men carried out individual works simultaneously, and Wilds junior established his own independent company as well after 1823. Although he still had some involvement with his father and Busby's work, his own projects took up more of his time over the next 25 years: Oriental Place, Sillwood Place, Western Terrace, Hanover Crescent, Park Crescent, the Royal Newburgh Assembly Rooms and the Royal Albion Hotel all still exist and are listed buildings. The Anthaeum, a gigantic dome-shaped conservatory he designed for Henry Phillips in 1832–33, collapsed the day before its scheduled opening; Wilds had resigned from the project before its completion because the building contractor was taking risks with the structural integrity of the building.

Wilds junior also worked in Gravesend, a town in Kent. His scheme for a new town at Milton, a neighbouring parish, in the 1820s was not carried out, but in 1836 he designed Gravesend Town Hall in the Classical style (both the building and the adjacent High Street are dominated by its "noble Greek Doric tetrastyle portico"), and between 1838 and 1841 he designed triumphal arch-style entrance lodges and a chapel at Gravesend Cemetery. These were of brick with pink stucco façades and were also in the Classical/Greek Revival style.

Later in his life, Wilds junior experimented in other areas: he invented a new way of cleaning chimneys, proposed a breakwater to protect Brighton's coastline, and served as an officer of the Brighton Commissioners for three years from 1842. In 1852, the Commissioners asked him to plant elm trees along the road to Brighton Racecourse; this road became known as Elm Grove. He moved to Shoreham-by-Sea, where he died in 1857. He was buried at the town's St Nicolas' Church.

== Architectural characteristics ==
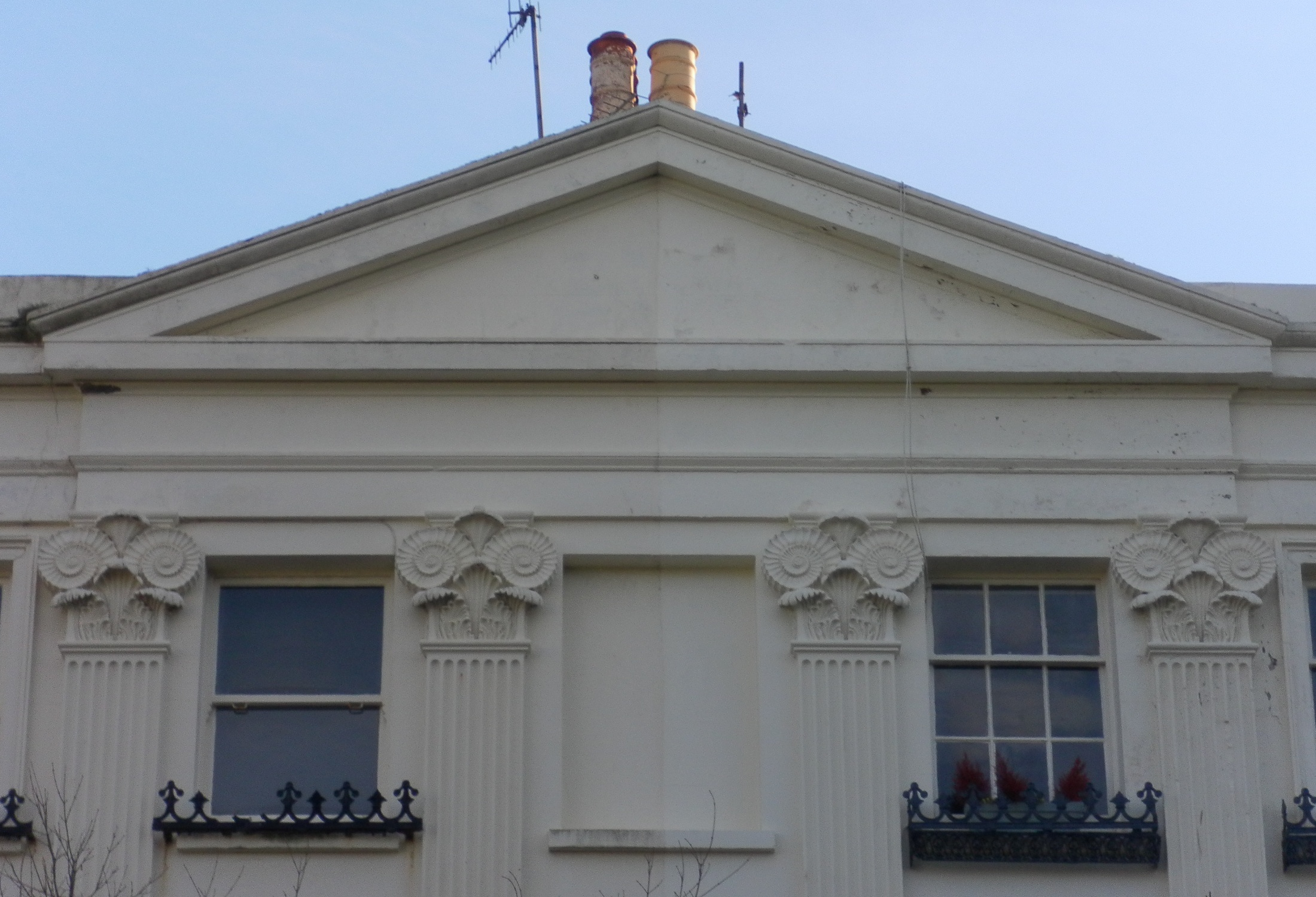
Wilds used ammonite capitals, as shown here at Montpelier Crescent.

Many buildings originally attributed to Wilds senior in partnership with Charles Busby—in particular, the terraces of the Kemp Town estate—have now been accredited to Wilds junior. At both Kemp Town and other locations he worked at, architectural devices and features characteristic of Wilds junior can be seen: Egyptian-style flourishes and scallop designs inlaid into stuccoed walls above windows in his earlier days, and a move towards the Italianate style when that became popular later. His most distinctive and famous motif—which his father also used, and which had been developed during their time in partnership in Lewes—was the ammonite capital. This was a type of Ionic capital used to decorate the top of pilasters and columns; it took the spiral shape of an ammonite fossil. As well as approving of the design, the Wilds enjoyed the pun on their unusual first name, and used it on many buildings. Wilds junior designed his father's headstone at St Nicholas' Church and decorated it with an ammonite capital design.

== Works ==
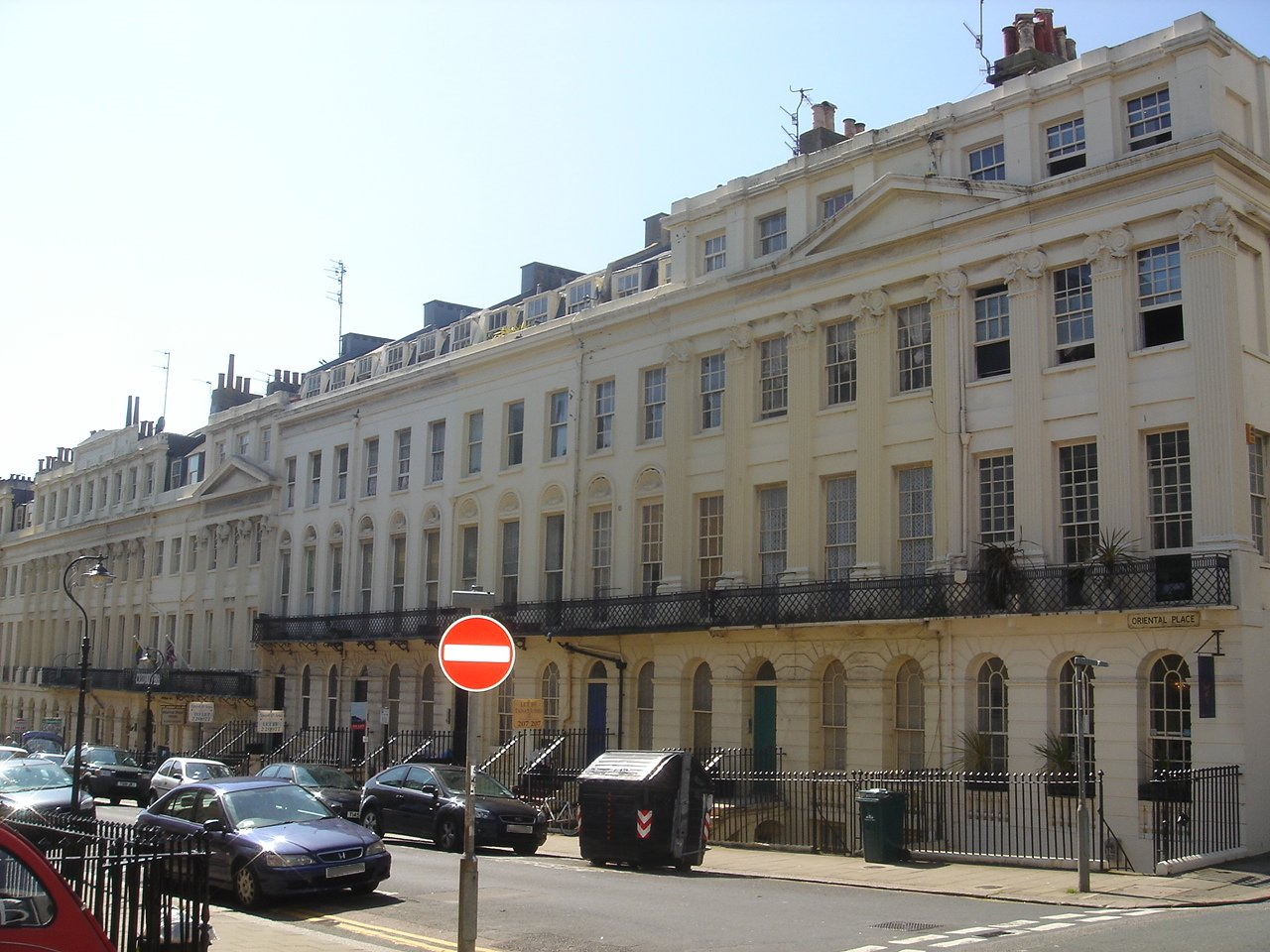
The west side of Oriental Place

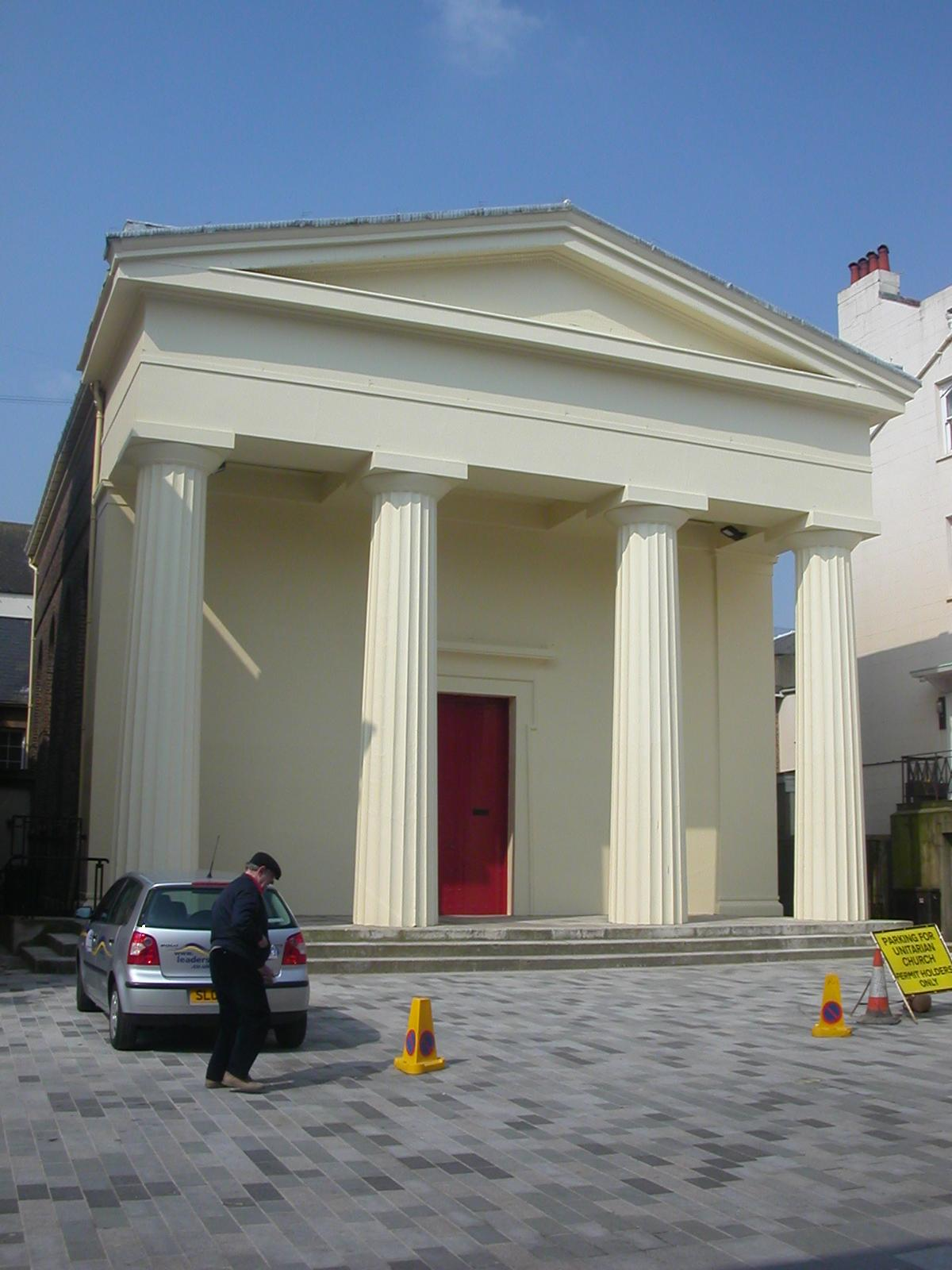
Brighton Unitarian Church

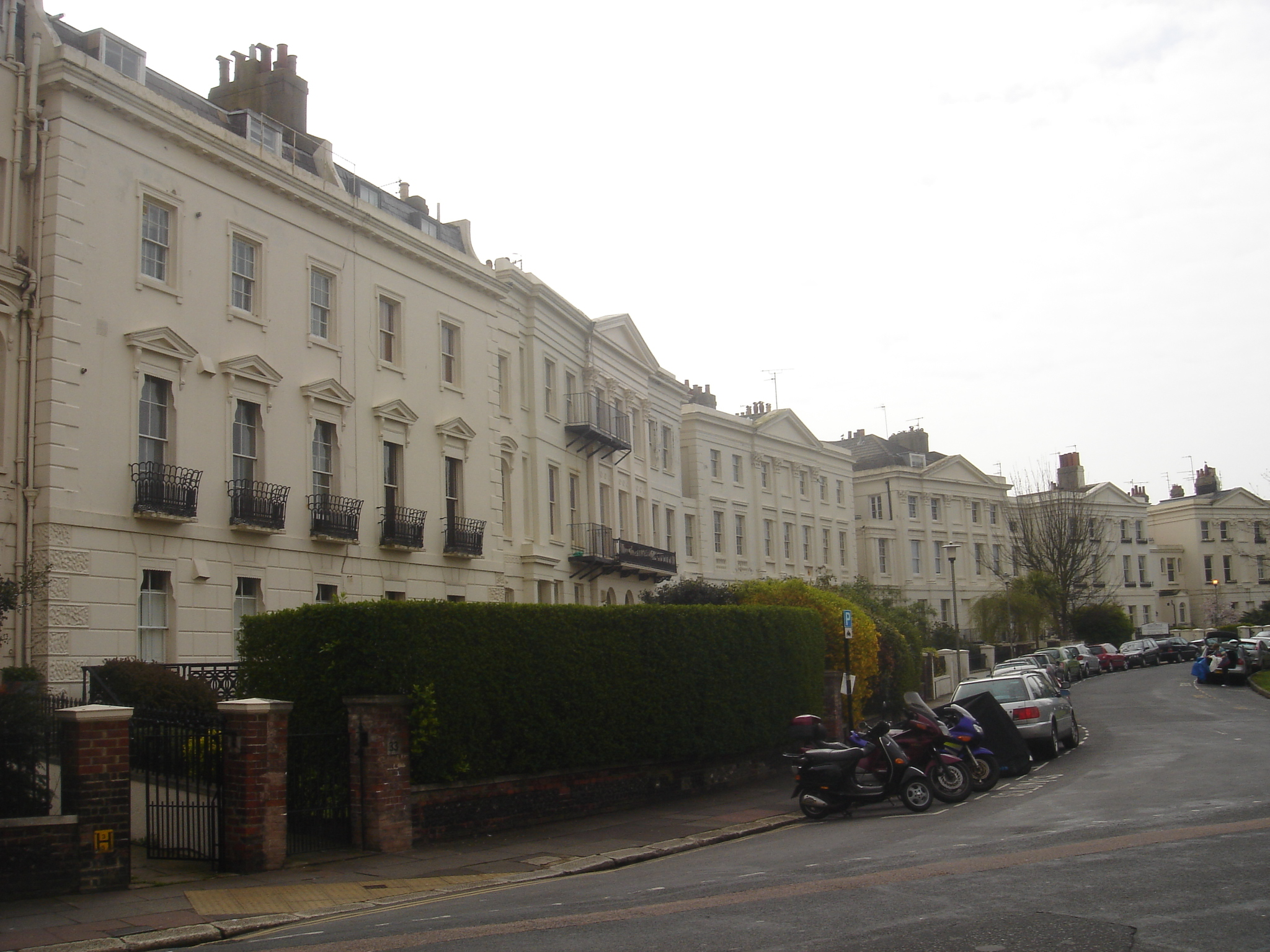
7–31 Montpelier Crescent

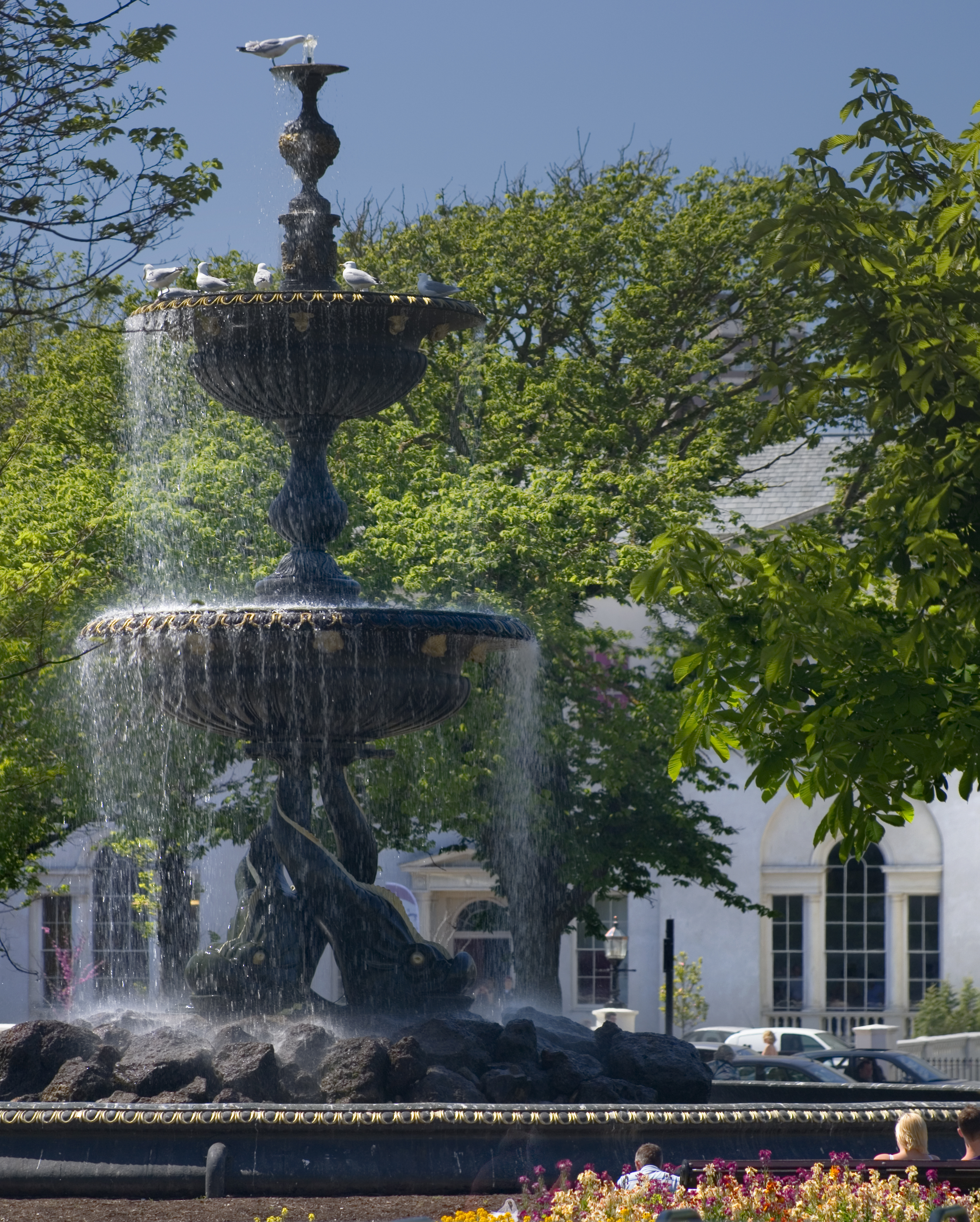
Victoria Fountain, Old Steine

Brighton Unitarian Church, a Grade II*-listed building, was built early in Wilds junior's architectural career. He designed the 350-capacity building with guidance from its first minister, Dr Morell. It was intended to resemble the Temple of Thesæus in Athens, and has an enormous tetrastyle portico of four Doric columns beneath a pediment.

Six years later, a merchant named Charles Elliott acquired the right to build a proprietary chapel on land belonging to the 3rd Earl of Egremont east of Brighton; Wilds junior created another Classical-style design for the new St Mary the Virgin Church. It was based on the Temple of Nemesis. By 1876, its structural condition was so poor that it collapsed, and it was rebuilt in red-brick Gothic style.

Oriental Place and Sillwood Place are the remaining parts of an ambitious scheme for which Wilds junior was hired in 1825 by a horticulturalist and landscape gardener, Henry Phillips, who had designed Kemp Town's enclosed gardens. He proposed an Oriental-style garden with a tall, steam-heated glasshouse called the Athenaeum, a library, museum and school, all surrounded by high-class houses. Wilds junior started building two north–south terraces accordingly, but Phillips' money ran out and he abandoned the project. A local magistrate bought the land in 1827 and asked Wilds junior to finish the work. Sillwood Place was built on the proposed Athenaeum site. Ammonite capitals feature prominently on Oriental Place, which is listed at Grade II*.

Wilds junior also built Hanover Crescent, to the northeast of Brighton off the Lewes Road, on behalf of a speculator—this time, local entrepreneur Henry Brooker. He felt that property speculation would be profitable even in areas further away from the town centre, such was Brighton's growing popularity in the Regency era, so he bought a set of strips of farmland in 1814 and commissioned Wilds junior to build a crescent-shaped façade and the shells of houses; buyers could then add internal fittings as they wished. They were built in around 1822 and are listed at Grade II.

Between 1822 and 1825, Wilds and Busby designed and built Gothic House on Western Road at the top of Western Terrace. Regency Gothic in style, it represents the only occasion they attempted the Gothic Revival style. It is a Grade II-listed building. On the other side of Western Terrace, the Western Pavilion was built in an elaborate Oriental and Indian style in imitation of the Royal Pavilion in 1828, and is now a Grade II* listed building. Amon Henry Wilds built it as his own house. He also lived at Gothic House and the central house in Western Terrace (now No.6).

Following the success of his work in Brighton, Wilds was commissioned to design a new crescent for the growing seaside town of Worthing, 11 miles west along the coast. Originally to be called Royal Park Crescent, it became known simply as Park Crescent. Wilds also designed a triumphal arch and Swiss Cottages for the site.

On Montpelier Road in the Montpelier area of Brighton, he built numbers 53 to 56—a three-storey terrace of four houses designed as two identical pairs—in about 1830. The entrances are between Doric pilasters, and there are ammonite capitals at second-floor level. There are small cast-iron balconies outside the first-floor windows. The group has been listed at Grade II.

Nearby Montpelier Crescent was Wilds junior's largest-scale independent work. Built between 1843 and 1847 in the Seven Dials area, whose development had been stimulated by the recent opening of the nearby railway station, it was laid out as a curving terrace of mansions, each divided into two dwellings. Some had pilasters decorated with ammonite capitals. The section of the crescent now numbered 7–31 is listed at Grade II*; the other houses are of a different design and are newer: they date from around 1855 and are listed at Grade II in four separate parts.

In 1820 or 1826, Wilds (possibly in conjunction with Busby) rebuilt a terraced house on Castle Square to form the Royal Pavilion Tavern. He refronted it in the Regency style with a stuccoed bow front. The building is Grade II-listed. Around the same time he also worked on 1a Castle Square a short distance away.

Wilds Junior's last work in Brighton was the Victoria Fountain in Old Steine. Partly paid for by public donations, it was unveiled on 24 May 1846—Queen Victoria's 27th birthday—and is now a Grade II listed structure. It consists of two cast-iron or bronze basins, one of which stands on three dolphins, and a pool, and is 32 feet (9.8 m) high. The iron casting was done at a local foundry, and the sculpting was undertaken by a Mr Pepper. The structure cost £989.16s.7d., and a further £114.7s.6d. was spent constructing it.

== See also ==
- Buildings and architecture of Brighton and Hove

== Bibliography ==
- Antram, Nicholas; Morrice, Richard (2008). Brighton and Hove. Pevsner Architectural Guides. London: Yale University Press. ISBN 978-0-300-12661-7.
- Berry, Sue (2005). Georgian Brighton. Chichester: Phillimore & Co. Ltd. ISBN 1-86077-342-7.
- Brighton Polytechnic. School of Architecture and Interior Design (1987). A Guide to the Buildings of Brighton. Macclesfield: McMillan Martin. ISBN 1-869865-03-0.
- Carder, Timothy (1990). The Encyclopaedia of Brighton. Lewes: East Sussex County Libraries. ISBN 0-86147-315-9.
- Collis, Rose (2010). The New Encyclopaedia of Brighton. (based on the original by Tim Carder) (1st ed.). Brighton: Brighton & Hove Libraries. ISBN 978-0-9564664-0-2.
- Dale, Antony (1950). The History and Architecture of Brighton. Brighton: Bredin & Heginbothom Ltd.
- Dale, Antony (1967) [1947]. Fashionable Brighton 1820–1860 (2nd ed.). Newcastle-upon-Tyne: Oriel Press Ltd. ISBN 0-85362-028-8.
- Dale, Antony (1976). Brighton Town and Brighton People. Chichester: Phillimore & Co. ISBN 0-85033-219-2.
- Dale, Antony (1989). Brighton Churches. London: Routledge. ISBN 0-415-00863-8.
- Gilbert, Edmund M. (1954). Brighton: Old Ocean's Bauble. Hassocks: Flare Books. ISBN 0-901759-39-2.
- Musgrave, Clifford (1981). Life in Brighton. Rochester: Rochester Press. ISBN 0-571-09285-3.
- Nairn, Ian; Pevsner, Nikolaus (1965). The Buildings of England: Sussex. Harmondsworth: Penguin Books. ISBN 0-14-071028-0.
- Newman, John (1976). West Kent and the Weald. Buildings of England (2nd ed.). Harmondsworth: Penguin Books. ISBN 0-14-071038-8.
