= Park Crescent, Worthing =

Listed terrace of Georgian houses in Worthing, England

Park Crescent
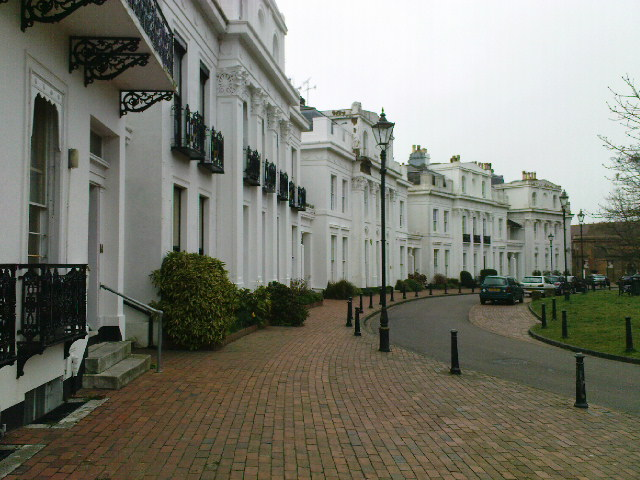
- Park Crescent looking east

- Location within West Sussex

General information
- Architectural style: Georgian
- Location: Worthing, West Sussex, England
- Coordinates: 50.8119°N 0.3627°W
- Year built: 1831–33

Design and construction
- Architect: Amon Henry Wilds

Listed Building – Grade II*
- Official name: 1–14, Park Crescent
- Designated: 11 October 1949
- Reference no.: 1250470

Park Crescent is a Grade II* listed terrace of 14 Georgian houses in Worthing, England, designed in 1829 by Amon Henry Wilds, son of the architect Amon Wilds and constructed between 1831 and 1833. AH Wilds had previously worked on other large projects including the Kemp Town estate in nearby Brighton.

Arranged in a serpentine shape, the terrace overlooks thickly planted grounds of Amelia Park, in the manner of Bath. It is built on a slight ridge close to what was in the 1830s the edge of the town by the boundary with the neighbouring parish of Heene and would have overlooked fields, with views extending to the parish churches of Tarring and Goring. There are two cottages ornés, originally called north and south Swiss Cottages, and now a hotel. It is likely that Wilds intended the 'alpine-style' cottages to be a discovery on walks into the woods of Amelia Park. Park Crescent comprises 14 houses, each originally having three floors together with servants' quarters in the basement.

== Background and significance ==
Initially planned to be given the name Royal Park Crescent, the Royal was dropped, perhaps when UK-wide recession stopped building in the 1830s. It had originally been intended to extend the building further to the west to line up with the Swiss cottages and take the terrace to 22 houses.

Park Crescent has given its name to Crescent Road, which runs southwards to the sea. Richmond Road, which runs east-west close to Park Crescent, was formerly known as Park Lane or Park Crescent Lane until it was renamed after the 6th Duke of Richmond.

Close to Park Crescent lies the site of some Roman burials from the 4th century, identified by coins of Diocletian (reigned 284–305) and Constantine I (reigned 306–337) which were found with them.

The building was given Grade II* listed building status in 1949.

== Triumphal arch ==
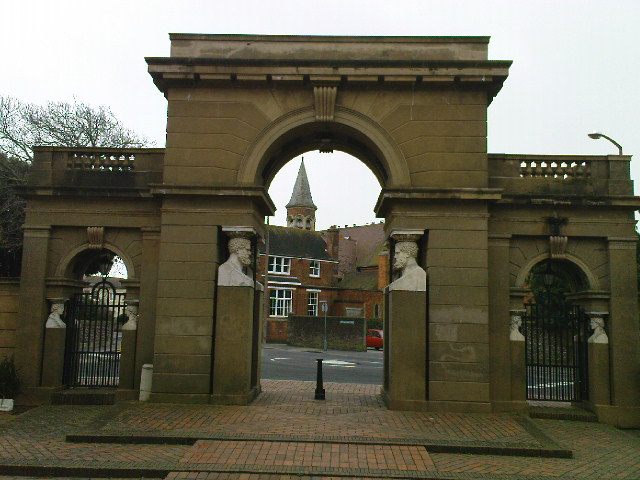
The triumphal arch at Park Crescent

Park Crescent is reached through a triumphal arch. The main archway, designed for carriages, contains the busts of four bearded men as atlantes. The two side arches, designed for pedestrians, each contain the busts of four young ladies as caryatids.

The busts were originally supplied by William Croggan of London, the cousin and successor to Eleanor Coade of the famous Coade stone factory in Lambeth. They are not actually stone but are cast from moulds, using the special formula and process that Eleanor Coade perfected over her years as the working owner of Coade stone. Examples her architectural adornments can be found at key landmarks throughout the UK, including Buckingham Palace and Windsor Castle.

== Notable residents ==
- Vera Arlett, playwright and poet
- Anthony Copley Fielding (1787–1855), watercolour painter
- Thomas Dyer Edwardes, a passenger of the Titanic

== See also ==
- Grade II* listed buildings in West Sussex
