= Charles Busby (architect) =

English architect

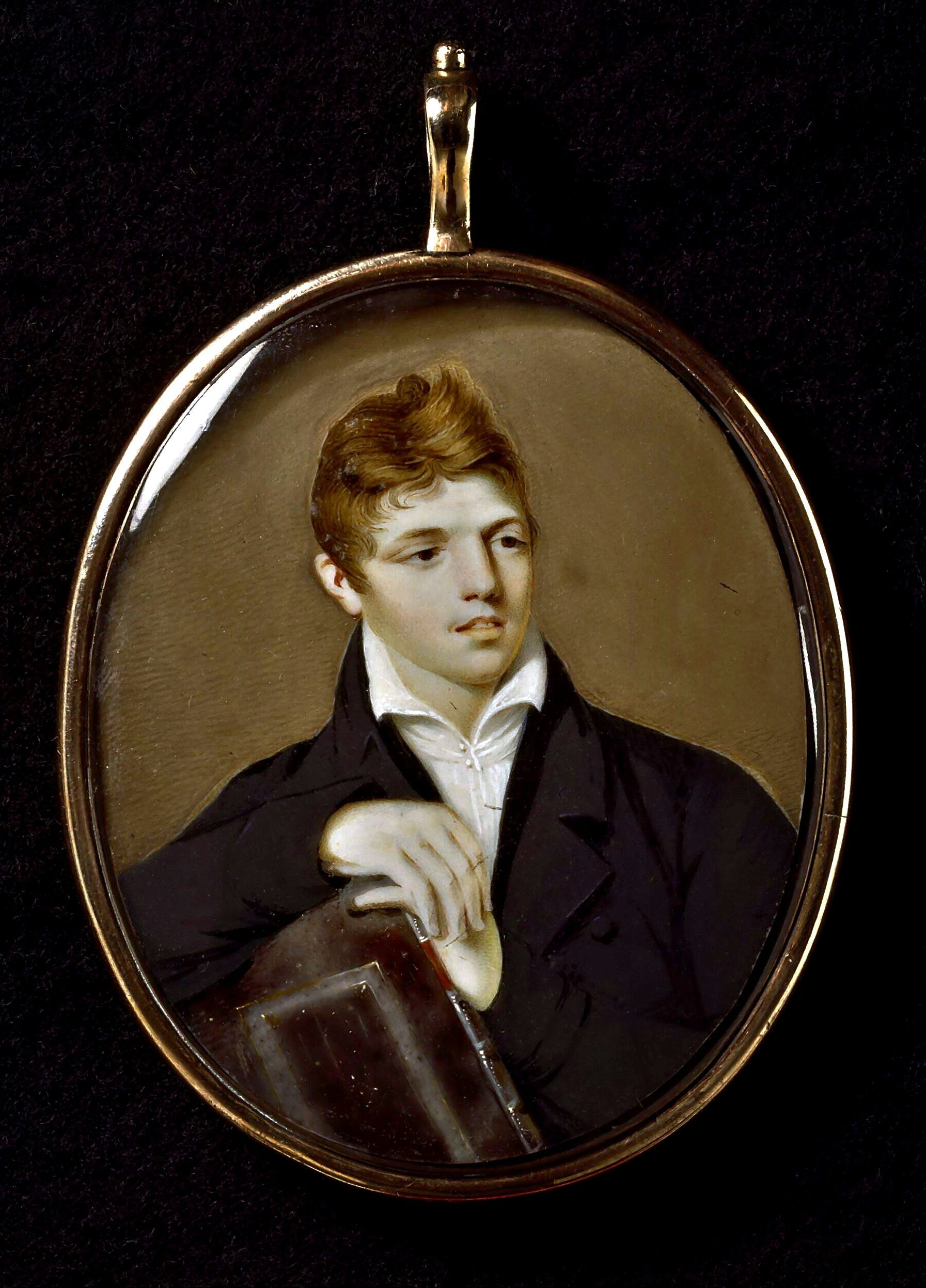
Charles Augustus Busby, с 1807

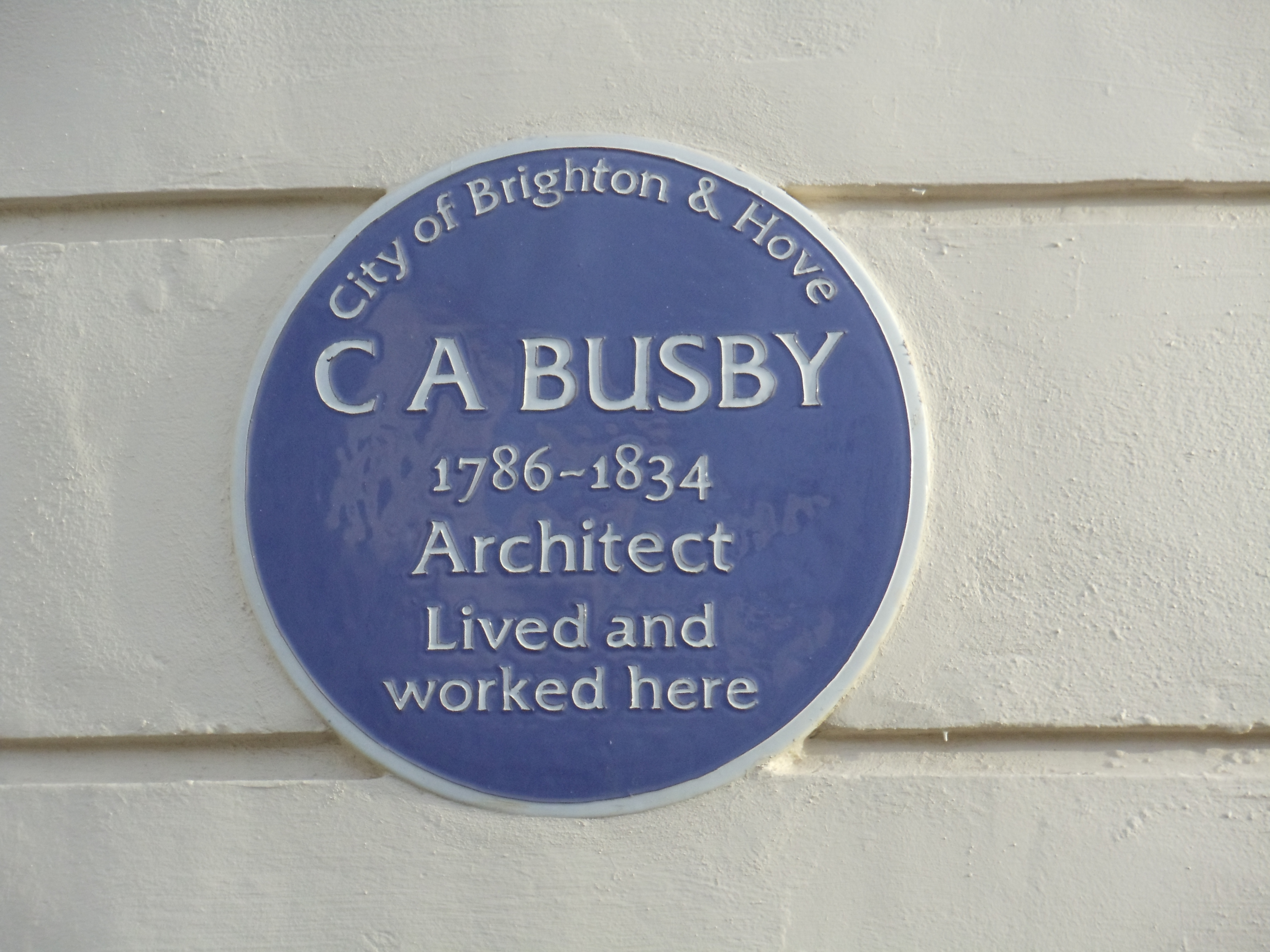
Blue plaque for Charles Busby in Hove

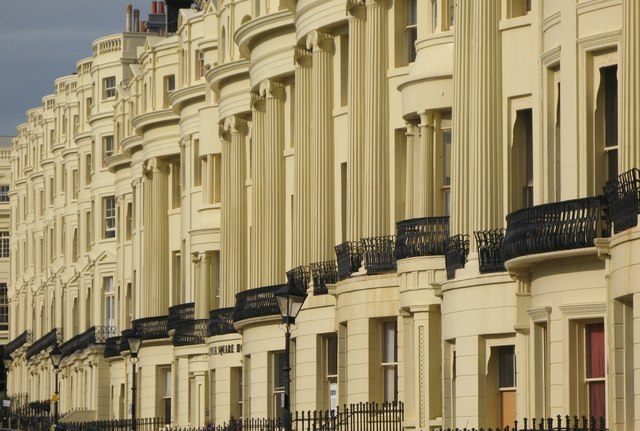
Brunswick Square, Hove designed by Charles Busby

Charles Augustin Busby (27 June 1786 – 18 September 1834) was an English architect.

He created many buildings in and around Brighton, Sussex, such as Brunswick Square and St Margaret's Church. His style usually included Romanesque-style pillars to his buildings.

He entered into an architectural partnership with fellow architect Amon Henry Wilds and his apprentice David J. Field. This has been called a decisive movement in his career. It was a partnership suggested by Thomas Read Kemp who was developing property in Brighton. Busby became key in the development of Brighton, not just as an architect but also investing in development himself.

== Family ==
Busby was born in London on 27 June 1786. He was the eldest of seven children born to the composer, musician and author Thomas Busby and Priscilla (née Angier). His parents socialised with people such as William Blake, Byron, Merlin the Ingenius Mechanic, Henry Vassal-Fox, 3rd Baron Holland and his wife Elizabeth Fox, Baroness Holland. It is said that they were politically radical.

In 1811 he married Louisa Mary Williams, with whom he had two children.

== Education ==
He was educated by his parents and shared his father's interest in science. Around 1802, when he was 16, he started a pupillage with the civil engineer and architect Daniel Asher Alexander.

Under the recommendation of Alexander that Busby entered the Royal Academy School in 1803. He graduated in 1807 and in 1808 was awarded the Gold Medal of the Royal Academy for an architectural drawing of proposed premises for the Royal Society and the Society of Antiquaries.

== Books published ==
In 1808 Busby published his first book called 'A Series of Designs for Villas and Country Houses adapted with Economy to the Comforts and to the Elegancies of Modern Life. In the preface to this book Busby attacked the fashion for Egyptian architecture: "Of all the vanities which a sickly fashion has produced, the Egyptian style in modern Archi-tecture appears the most absurd". He preferred the simplicity of Greek architecture.

In 1810 Busby's second book was published. It was called 'A Collection of Designs for Modern Embellishments suitable to Parlours and Dining Rooms, Folding Doors, Chimney Pieces Etc.".

== America ==
Between 1817 and 1819 Busby lived and studied in North America. He visited New York in 1818 and in June an article that he had written was published in the American Monthly Magazine and later published in New York as a separate pamphlet. In this he wrote of his admiration for the Brooklyn ferry boat, which had led him to study paddle-steamer propulsion in water. In June 1818 he experimented with a boat 80 feet long and 14 feet wide.

Busby also visited Massachusetts, Connecticut, New Jersey, Pennsylvania, Maryland and Virginia. He made drawings of State Penitentiaries in these cities and proposed to publish a volume with descriptions but this never appeared. There is no record of him designing any buildings while in America.

== Building achievements ==
His expertise was used by Lloyd Hesketh Bamford-Hesketh for the overall design of Gwrych Castle.

He was also responsible for the Commercial Rooms, Bristol (1810), built in his favoured Grecian style. It was his first important commission. Busby's plans were accepted in a public competition in 1810. The building was completed the following year. Inside is a large hall known as the Grand Coffee Room. It is lit by a cupola which is supported by twelve caryatides. Outside, above the entrance, there are three figures over the pediment which represent the City of Bristol, Commerce and Navigation designed by J. G. Bubb of London.

He designed St Margaret's Church in Brighton for Barnard Gregory, who edited the Brighton Gazette at the time. It was named after Gregory's wife Margaret. At the time it was considered to be the best classical church in Brighton. It was second only to St Peter's Church in size with a seating capacity of 1,500 persons.

=== Brunswick Town Estate ===
Busby developed the Brunswick Town Estate, which was built as a self-contained settlement surrounded by open fields.

In late 1824 Busby signed a contract with the Reverend Thomas Scutt, who was a landowner of more than 300 acres to the west of Brighton, to develop a new town, in 35 acres of land, in the Regency style. It would be named Brunswick Town. It was developed between 1824 and 1834, the time of his death. In 1824 he had advocated hot running water for his houses in Brunswick Square.

== Blue plaque ==
A blue plaque was installed on what was his family home at 2 Landsdowne Place in Brighton and Hove. The house formed part of his last development named Stanhope Place after his son.

== Bankruptcy ==
He was arrested for debt in 1829. In February 1833 he was declared bankrupt. His debts of more than £12,500 were paid off by his friends. Busby died on 18 September 1834, aged forty-six, without leaving a will.
