= Montpelier, Brighton =

Inner suburban area of Brighton, England

Coordinates: 50.8272°N 0.1496°W

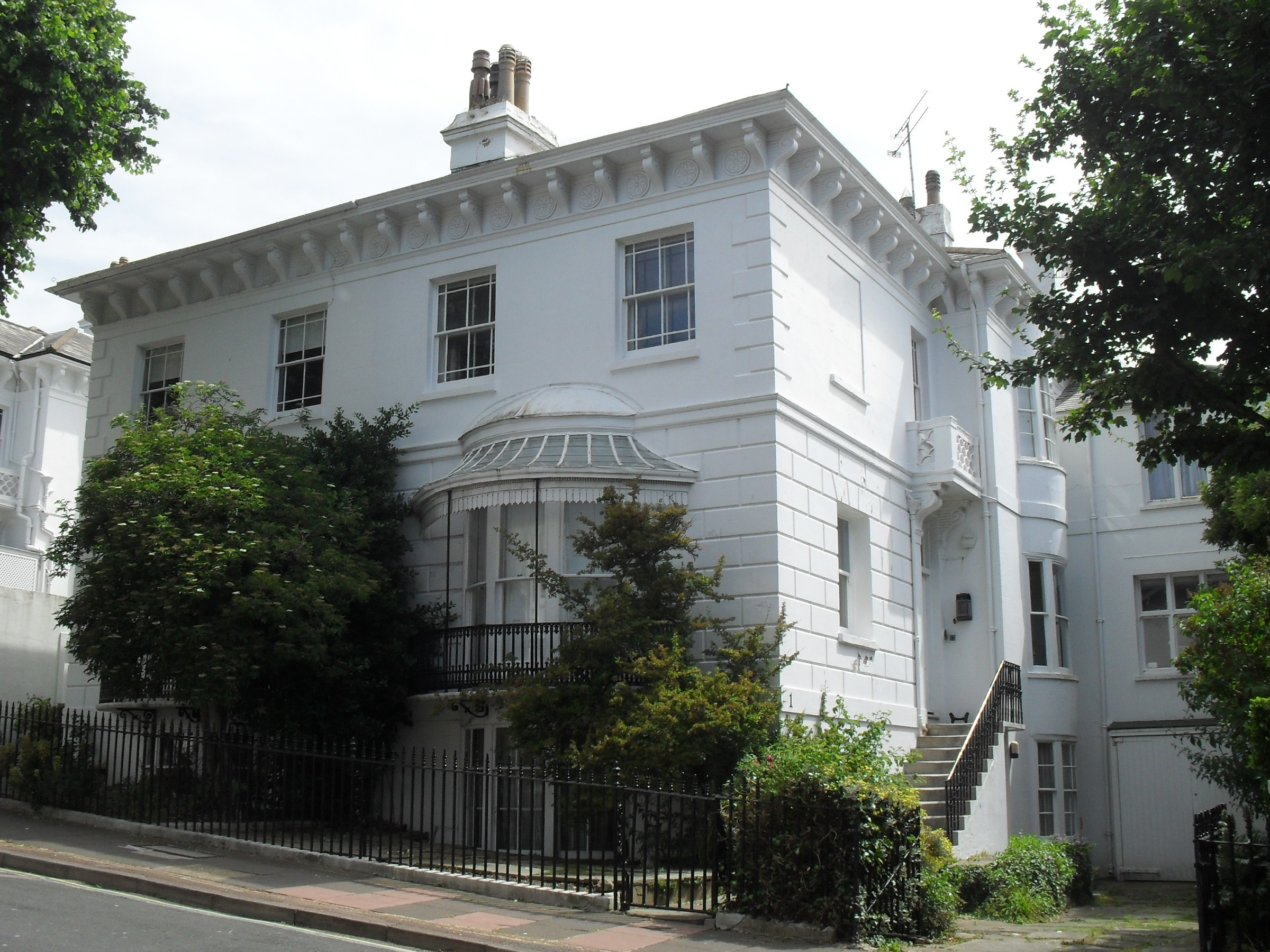
Montpelier is characterised by early 19th-century stucco-clad terraced houses and villas, such as 1 and 2 Montpelier Villas.

Montpelier is an inner suburban area of Brighton, part of the English city and seaside resort of Brighton and Hove. Developed together with the adjacent Clifton Hill area in the mid-19th century, it forms a high-class, architecturally cohesive residential district with "an exceptionally complete character". Stucco-clad terraced housing and villas predominate, but two of the city's most significant Victorian churches and a landmark hospital building are also in the area, which lies immediately northwest of Brighton city centre and spreads as far as the ancient parish boundary with Hove. The name Montpelier was chosen by the original developers of the area as an intentional reference to Montpellier a then-fashionable French spa resort.

Development was initially stimulated when one of the main roads out of Brighton was turnpiked in the late 18th century, but the hilly land—condemned as "hideous masses of unfledged earth" by John Constable, who painted it nevertheless—was mostly devoted to agriculture until the 1820s. The ascent of Brighton from provincial fishing town to fashionable resort prompted a building boom in the next quarter-century, and Montpelier and Clifton Hill were transformed into districts of architecturally homogeneous streets with carefully designed, intricately detailed housing. Little demolition, infilling or redevelopment has occurred since, and hundreds of buildings have been granted listed status. The whole suburb is also one of 34 conservation areas in the city of Brighton and Hove.

Historic buildings include The Temple—local landowner Thomas Read Kemp's house, now a private school—the former Royal Alexandra Hospital for Children, currently being redeveloped, and large mid 19th-century houses such as Montpelier Hall. The area also has several set-piece residential squares and crescents such as Clifton Terrace, Powis Square, Vernon Terrace, Montpelier Crescent and Montpelier Villas. The architectural partnership of Amon Wilds, his son Amon Henry Wilds and Charles Busby—the most important architects in Regency era Brighton and Hove—designed many of these. Montpelier's range of churches includes some of the city's finest, but others have been demolished in the postwar period.

== Location and character ==
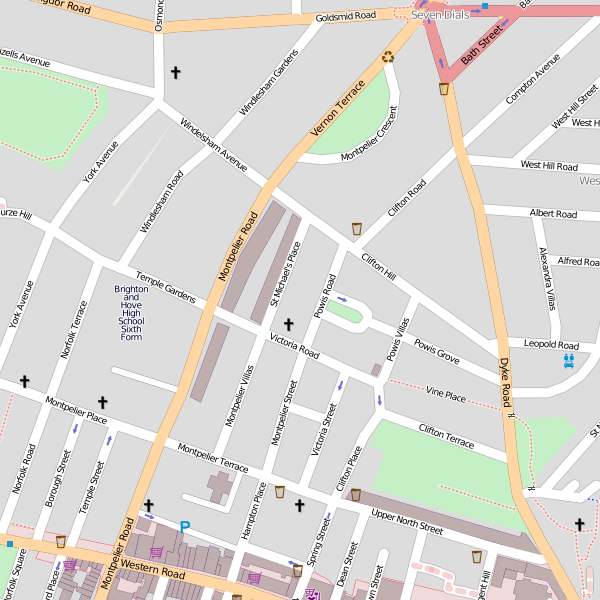
Montpelier covers the area between Seven Dials, Dyke Road, Western Road and the boundary with Hove (east of York Avenue). St Nicholas Church is at the bottom right; St Ann's Well Gardens are top left.

Montpelier is a centrally located inner suburb of the city of Brighton and Hove. The Lanes, the ancient centre of Brighton, is about 0.7 miles (1.1 km) to the southeast, and central Hove is about 1.1 miles (1.8 km) to the west. (Note: Distances are measured from St Michael and All Angels Church to Black Lion Street and Hove Town Hall respectively.) London is 50 1/2 miles (81.3 km) to the north. (Note: This is the distance between Brighton and London Bridge railway stations. The former is close to Montpelier, to the east on the far side of West Hill.) There is no single official definition of the area covered by Montpelier and Clifton Hill, but most authorities (including Brighton and Hove City Council) define it as the area west of West Hill and east of the ancient parish boundary between Brighton and Hove. The Seven Dials area and the road junction of that name are to the north, forming the apex of the roughly triangular area, and the major city-centre shopping street Western Road lies to the south. Two roads form important through routes for cross-city traffic: Montpelier Road runs south–north from the city centre to Seven Dials, and the west–east Upper North Street links the city centre to Hove. Both are busy, but traffic is limited in the smaller residential streets.

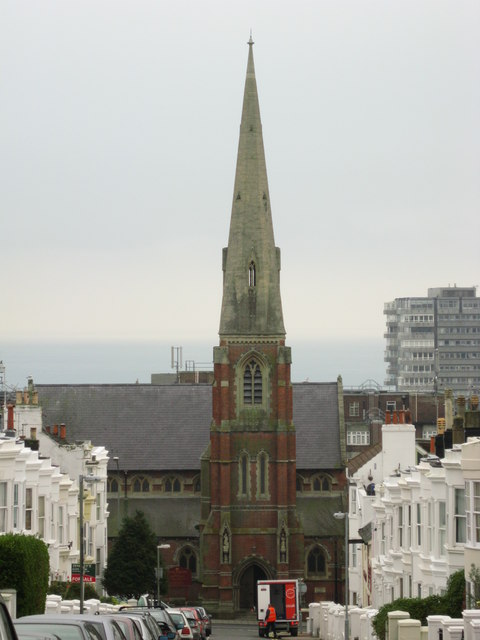
Many of the north–south streets offer long views. From the top of Victoria Street, St Mary Magdalen's Church and the English Channel are visible.

Dyke Road—the ancient route from Brighton to Devil's Dyke and Steyning and eventually on to London—forms the conservation area's eastern boundary except at the southern end, where it extends east of the road to include St Nicholas Church (Brighton's original parish church), Wykeham Terrace and other small parts of West Hill. The land rises gently from the southwest to a summit at Clifton Hill. Writing in 1833, J.D. Parry (Note: In An Historical and Descriptive Account of the Coast of Sussex.) said that the hill "commands a magnificent view, and has very fine air". John Constable, who stayed in Brighton several times during the 1820s, was less impressed: he described it as "hideous masses of unfledged earth called the country". Nevertheless, he produced several paintings of the area, which provide a record of its appearance just before it became suburbanised.

Geologically, Montpelier is built on grassy downland and sheep-pasture, beneath which is chalk. This pattern is repeated across the rest of the city, most of the Sussex coast and for several miles inland. The chalk, "one of the most complete and accessible strata anywhere in Europe", was formed about 100 million years ago. As in other areas where chalk is prevalent, the soil above it is rendzina. Found in thin layers and with a high calcium content, it has a poor agricultural value.

In common with the rest of Brighton, the area has a temperate climate: its Köppen climate classification is Cfb. It is characterised by mild, calm weather with high levels of sunshine, sea breezes and a "healthy, bracing air" attributed to the low level of tree cover. Average rainfall levels increase as the land rises: the 1958–1990 mean was 740 millimetres (29 in) on the seafront and about 1,000 millimetres (39 in) at the top of the South Downs above Brighton.

Locally, a distinction is made between the northern part of the area towards the top of the hill—this area is known as Clifton or Clifton Hill—and the lower land to the south and west, as far as the Hove boundary and Western Road, known as Montpelier. The names are also used interchangeably, and some sources make further distinctions: the area around Powis Grove, Powis Villas, Powis Road and St Michael and All Angels Church is called Powis in one study of the area. Although Montpelier first appears as the name of the area on a map of 1824, (Note: In R. Sicklemore, Descriptive Views of Brighton. The publication date is incorrectly given as 1842 by Brighton and Hove City Council.) this still makes it the earliest Montpelier in England—predating those in Bristol, Cheltenham and elsewhere in taking and adapting the name of the French spa resort Montpellier. The town was popular with rich English people in the 18th century for convalescence: it had an excellent climate and good medical facilities. The term "Montpelier Estate" is sometimes used for the area as a whole.

=== Demography and politics ===
Montpelier and Clifton Hill are predominantly residential: about 20% of buildings have other uses, primarily commercial and retail. Some areas have clusters of small shops, and there are many pubs and restaurants. The southern part of Montpelier is very close to Brighton's main retail area, Western Road and the Churchill Square shopping centre. Many streets provide long southward views towards the sea.

The area forms part of Brighton and Hove City Council's Regency ward, one of 21 wards in the city. This is part of the Brighton Pavilion parliamentary constituency, which elected Caroline Lucas of the Green Party at the 2010 General Election. She held the seat with an increased majority at the 2015 General Election.

Regency is classified as a "Prospering Metropolitan B" ward by the Office for National Statistics. 0.91% of the United Kingdom population live in such a ward, whose characteristics include much lower proportions of children, manufacturing sector workers, detached houses and households with more than one car than the national average, and much higher proportions of single-person households, people qualified to degree level and privately rented accommodation than the average. Population density is also much higher in Prospering Metropolitan B wards than in the United Kingdom as a whole.

The Regency ward covers 235.5 acres (95.3 ha) of central Brighton, bounded by Seven Dials to the north, the ancient Brighton/Hove parish boundary to the west, the English Channel to the south and Dyke Road, North Street and Old Steine to the east. It therefore includes territory that is not part of Montpelier, whose southern boundary at Western Road runs through the middle of the ward. At the time of the 2001 United Kingdom census, for which the size of the ward was measured at 88 acres (36 ha), Regency had a population of 8,510. Its population density of 96.25 persons per hectare was much higher than that of the city Brighton and Hove (29.98) and of South East England as a whole (4.2). The ethnic mix is similar to that of the wider city and of South East England as a whole: in the Census, 93.3% of people in Regency classified themselves as White, 2.1% as Mixed, 1.88% as Asian or Asian British, 1.79% as Chinese or Other, and 0.93% as Black British. The largest differences in comparison to Brighton and Hove overall were the lower proportion of White people and the higher proportion belonging to Chinese or other ethnic groups. The gender balance is significantly different from that of the city as a whole: while 48.38% of Brighton and Hove's residents were male (as recorded by the 2001 Census), the proportion rose to 54.49% of people in Regency ward.

== History ==
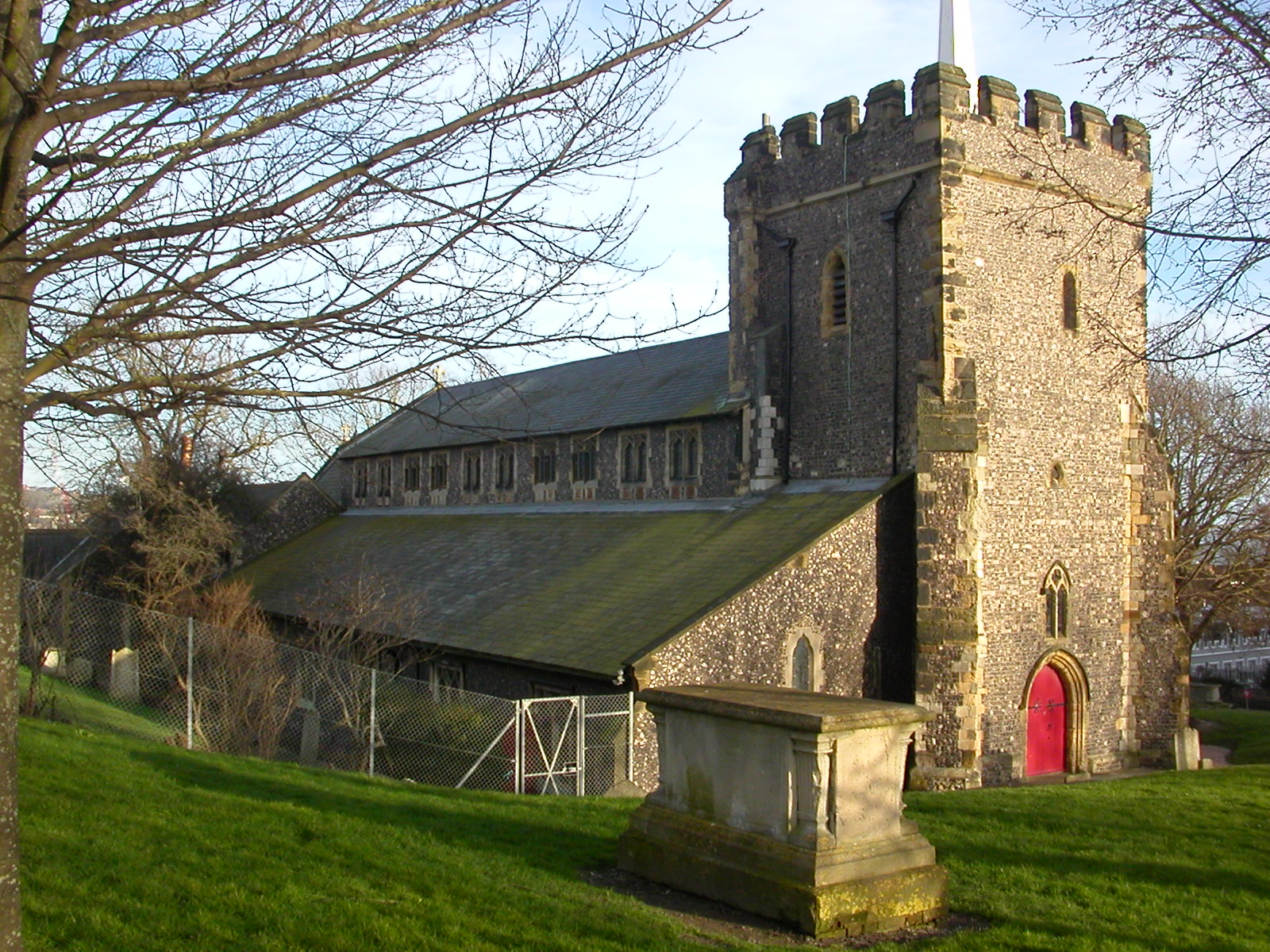
Before its development, the present Montpelier area was known as Church Hill in reference to St Nicholas Church.

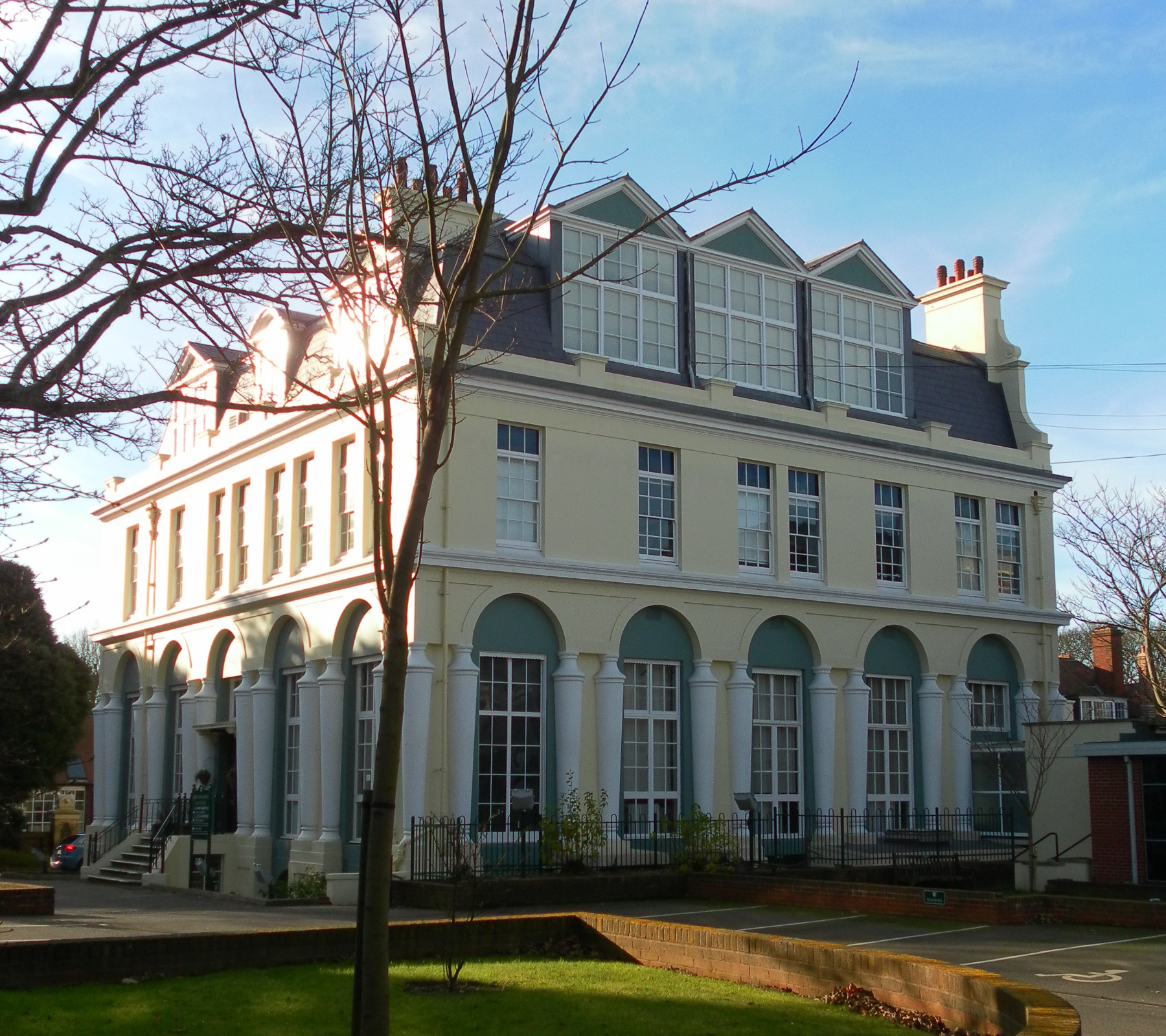
The Temple was built for Thomas Read Kemp in 1819 just before suburban growth started.

The South Downs, a range of chalk hills, surrounded the ancient fishing and farming village of Brighton (formerly Brighthelmston). The downland pasture sloped down to the English Channel coast and was farmed in one of two ways: some parts were divided into strips according to a local system of "laines", furlongs" and "paul-pieces", and other areas were left for the grazing of sheep. The area now covered by Montpelier was an example of the latter. The five laines around Brighton were based on land with a relatively gentle slope; when the gradient or height made the land too difficult to work, no more strips were marked out and the rest of the land was given over to grazing. A map of Brighton from the 1740s shows that a large section in the northwest of the parish—north of West Laine, west of North Laine and bisected by the road to Steyning—was marked as "sheep down". It had no official name at the time, but by 1792 it had become known as Church Hill in reference to St Nicholas Church, the parish church of Brighton which stood on a hillock near the road. The part west of the road was sometimes described as "Church Hill – West Side"; the corresponding "East Side" later became known as West Hill during Brighton's 19th-century growth. The road became a turnpike in 1777, increasing its importance, and became known as Dyke Road. Vine's Mill, one of several windmills built on the Downs around Brighton, was erected in 1810.

The sheep down was not common land: its ownership has been traced back to the 11th century (to Canute, Earl Godwin and his son King Harold), and by the late 18th century it was held by two influential local landowners. Thomas Kemp held about 41 acres (17 ha), and John Sackville, 3rd Duke of Dorset owned over 5 acres (2.0 ha). When Kemp died in 1811, his landholding transferred to his son Thomas Read Kemp. The Kemp family first acquired the land in 1770, when it was sold to them by the Friend family—whose history of large-scale land acquisition around Brighton goes back to the late 16th century and the purchase of the former St Bartholomew's Priory and its grounds.

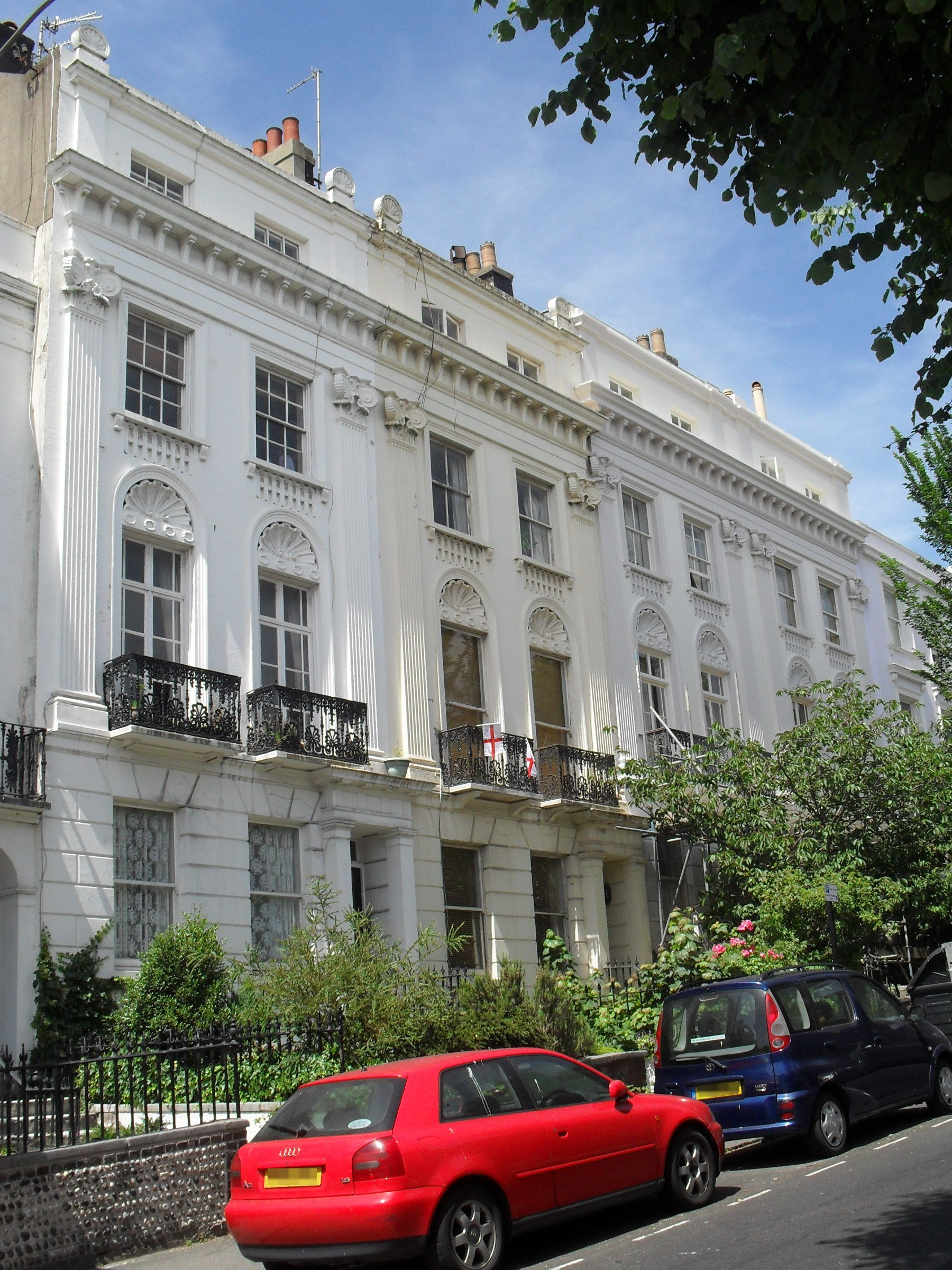
53–56 Montpelier Road are among "[Montpelier's] best houses".

Thomas Read Kemp had moved out of Brighton in 1807, but decided to return in 1819. By this time he was enjoying "a rich social life" and his considerable inherited wealth. As he owned so much land around Brighton, there were many sites he could choose for his new home; he selected a remote site near the track (running from the seafront to the Ditchling Road) which later became Montpelier Road. At the time there were only three people living on the farmland of "Church Hill – West Side", including an eccentric former marine corporal who occupied a cave in a former chalk pit. He had been invalided out of the Navy after fighting in the Battle of Copenhagen in 1801, but retained his military interest: he made chalk models to sell, and rigged up four pistols to form a miniature battery which he would fire to celebrate military anniversaries. Read Kemp's house, probably designed by Amon Wilds or his son Amon Henry Wilds, was called The Temple (and was popularly nicknamed "Kemp's Folly" or "the Brighton Mansion"). He may have chosen the secluded site because it was close to the chalybeate spring at St Ann's Well in the neighbouring parish of Hove, popularised by Dr Richard Russell in the 1750s but known to generations of shepherds before that for the health-giving effect it had on their sheep. The iron-rich water was used in "a primitive little spa" for about 100 years, and the associated Pump Room and gardens were popular with visitors long after that.

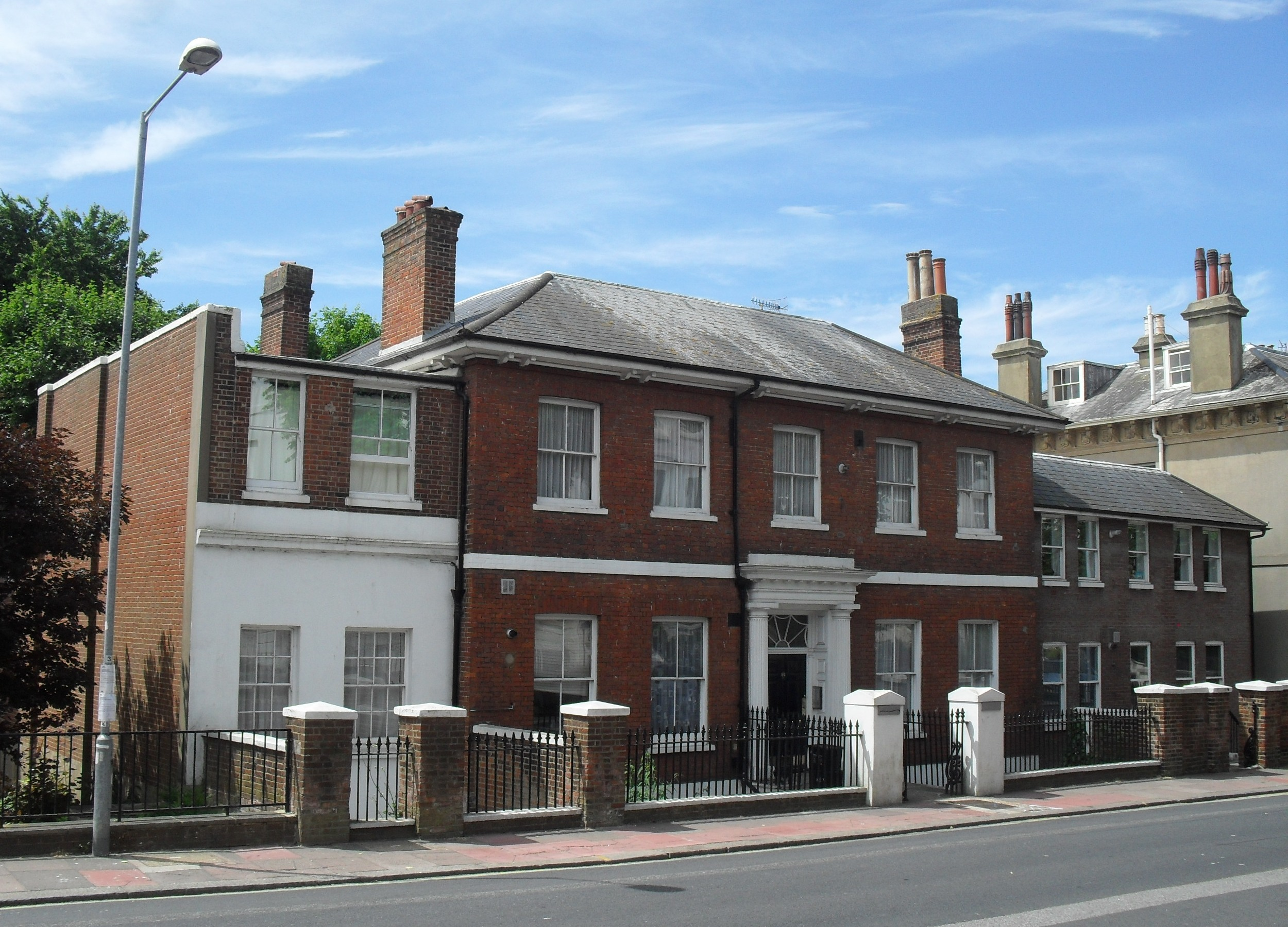
Montpelier Lodge was unusual in its use of red brickwork.

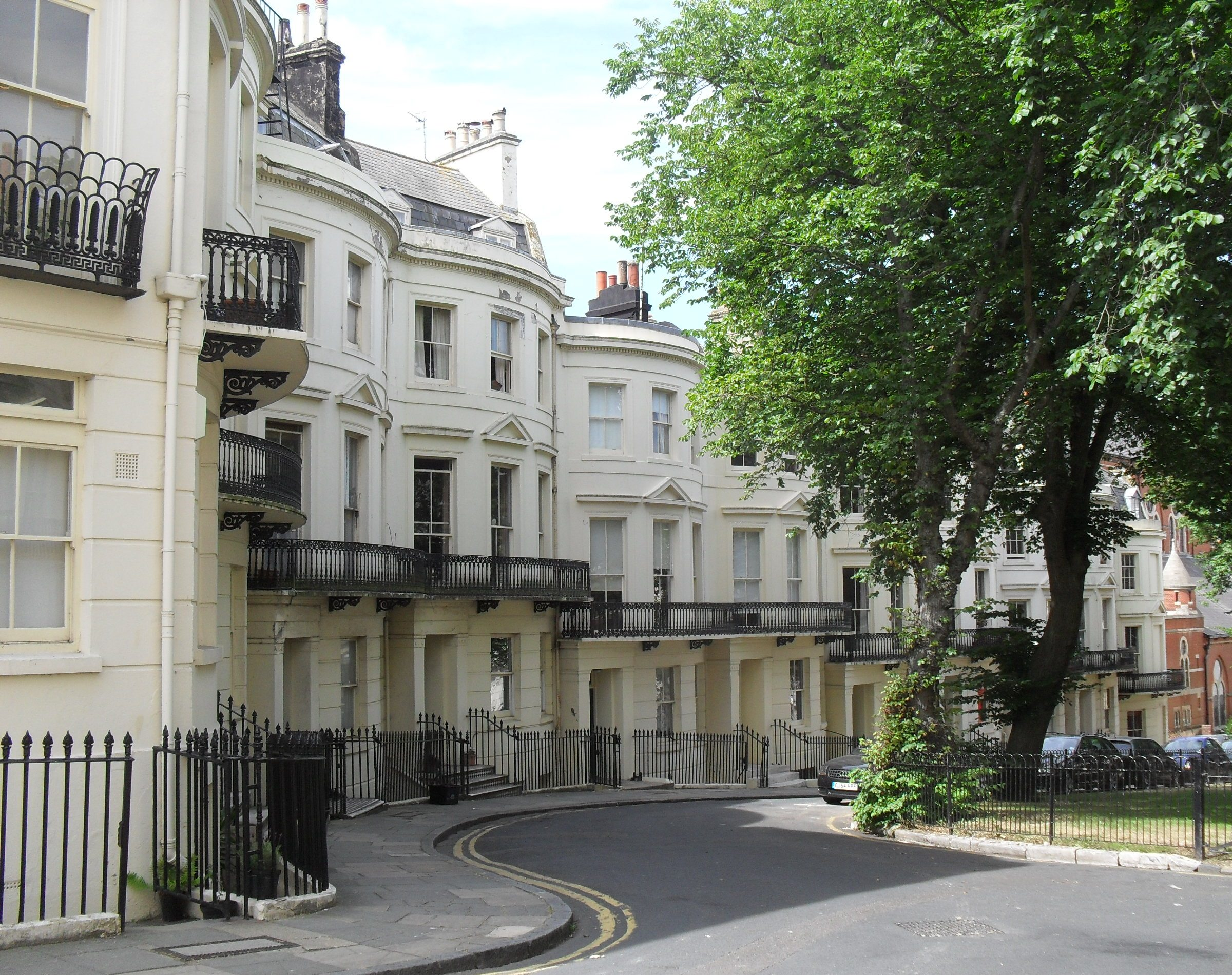
Powis Square was built round a central garden. St Michael and All Angels Church is in the background.

The increasing popularity of Brighton as a resort resulted in an "exponential growth in housing". In 1783, just after the first expansion outside the ancient four-street village, there were 600 houses; in 1801 there were 1,282, by 1811 another 1,096 had been completed, and in 1821 there were 4,299. The land of Church Hill was ideal for development—land ownership was not complex, unlike in many of the laines, and the sheltered southwest-facing slopes were close to both St Ann's Well and the centre of Brighton's fashionable social scene around Old Steine. The area developed rapidly as a residential district from the 1820s, and was one of the earliest of Brighton's many 19th-century suburbs. From 1823, Read Kemp became heavily involved in his speculative Kemp Town estate on the edge of Brighton, and he moved to a house there in 1827 (after which The Temple became a boys' school). He began selling plots of land throughout the area, and streets and areas of housing took shape. Montpelier Road was one of the first to develop, on the site of the long track which had given Read Kemp access to the seafront from his house; it is not named before 1820, but it appears on a map of 1822. Houses such as numbers 53–56, by Amon Henry Wilds, and the semi-detached villas of numbers 91–96, date from about 1830. Hampton Place, a sloping terrace of "especially pretty houses", was an 1820s development by speculator William Hallett, who occupied one of the houses himself. Around the same time, Amon Henry Wilds and Charles Busby built several houses on a former track which became Clifton Road, and work started at Montpelier Terrace with the construction of a pair of villas in 1823. Montpelier Lodge (c. 1830) on Montpelier Terrace stood out from the surrounding stuccoed buildings due to its red-brick walls; it also had an elaborate entrance with Doric columns and a delicately patterned fanlight.

Development accelerated after Thomas Read Kemp was declared bankrupt in 1837, forcing him to sell all his land and move to France. Parcels of land were rapidly developed with terraced streets (especially to the south, leading up from Western Road) and set-piece squares and crescents. The Temple was still isolated until 1834–35, when the firm of George Cheesman & Son built a new vicarage for the Vicar of Brighton Henry Michell Wagner. The "austere Neo-Tudor" house stood back from the nearest road. In about 1840, Wagner's sister moved to the newly built Belvedere House nearby, and encouraged development of the adjacent road which became Montpelier Place. (The four-storey houses of Belvedere Terrace were built on her behalf in the grounds of Belvedere House in about 1852.)

Brighton was connected to the railway network in 1840 when a line to Shoreham-by-Sea opened, followed in 1841 by the completion of the link to London. This stimulated growth even further, and the 1840s were a boom period for Montpelier. (Brighton as a whole grew rapidly in the 1840s—between 1841 and 1851, 2,806 new houses were built compared to 437 for the preceding decade—but the effect was greater in Montpelier because the station was close by at the foot of West Hill.) During the 1840s, Montpelier Villas and Montpelier Crescent were laid out, several houses were built in Clifton Road, Montpelier Road and Montpelier Terrace were fully built up, Upper North Street became an important route lined with "modest yet grandly treated" houses, the "very attractive composition" of Clifton Terrace was built (it was finished in 1847), Victoria Street was laid out with bay-fronted terraced houses, and Windlesham House was constructed near The Temple. This became the New Sussex Hospital in 1921 after alterations by the Clayton & Black architecture firm, but is now flats called Temple Heights.

Developments in the 1850s included Powis Square, Villas and Road, Norfolk Terrace and Vernon Terrace. The Powis area took its name from property developer John Yearsley, who was from Welshpool in Powys. Yearsley bought several acres of land on a leasehold basis from the Kemp family in 1846; he acquired the freehold soon after. (Thomas Read Kemp died in France in 1844, seven years after leaving Brighton to escape his debts.) Land was also acquired and developed by the prominent Hallett, Wisden, Baring and Faithfull families. (The Baring baronets were related to Thomas Read Kemp by marriage; Henry Faithfull, who worked with Yearsley to develop the Powis area, was the brother of MP George Faithfull; and Thomas and John Wisden were prolific builders.)

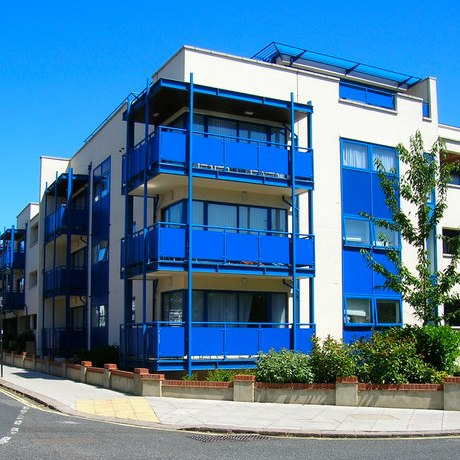
York Mansions occupy the part of the site of the former New Sussex Hospital for Women.

Denmark Terrace, a continuation of Vernon Terrace, was erected in the 1860s; at its south end it met Temple Gardens, the road on which The Temple stood. Also of the 1860s were parts of Norfolk Road (where development had started 30 years before), St Michael's Place (1868–69) with terraced houses "impressive in their length and height", and some infill development in Montpelier Terrace, Clifton Place, Powis Road and Vernon Terrace. Montpelier's residential development was nearly complete by the 1870s, as suggested by an Ordnance Survey map of that time which shows undeveloped fields only in the area beyond Vernon Terrace. In 1870 or 1871, Brighton Children's Hospital—established three years earlier in Western Road—moved to a new building on the site of the former Church Road School in West Hill. In 1880–81, Thomas Lainson built the new Royal Alexandra Hospital for Sick Children nearby at the junction of Dyke Road and Clifton Hill. It was extended and altered in 1904, 1906 and 1927–28.

Some more houses were built in the Edwardian era, mostly in the characteristic Edwardian style with bright red brick "standing out amongst the stucco". Examples include some in Temple Gardens and Vernon Gardens in the 1890s, a row on one side of Denmark Terrace, Windlesham Road (where numbers 14 and 16, built in 1903, are especially elaborate) and 18–25 Clifton Road (1903–04, with ornate gables and turreted corners). In 1902, the London & Brighton Express Electric Railway Company sought permission to build a new surface railway line from Westminster to a terminus near the junction of Montpelier Road and Western Road, passing Clifton Hill. Hove Council supported the parliamentary Bill, but nothing came of it; when the promoters proposed it again in 1903, the council were no longer interested.

Additions and alterations to the streetscape have been minimal since the early 20th century. Windlesham House became the New Sussex Hospital for Women in 1921 following alterations by Clayton & Black, who similarly rebuilt a 19th-century house on Montpelier Road as a chapel for Brighton's Christian Scientist community in the same year. The hospital was extended to the rear in the 1930s (but new flats called York Mansions were built on the site in 2001), and the Royal Alexandra Hospital absorbed a neighbouring villa. Additions to the Brighton & Hove High School, which had taken over The Temple, included a "drab" set of classrooms in the 1960s, a later administration block and a glazed sports hall in 2001–02 (the last two were designed by architects Morgan Carn Partnership). Demolitions included the former Emanuel Reformed Episcopal Church on Norfolk Terrace (replaced by a Baptist church) in 1965, The Dials Congregational Church in 1972 (built in 1871; replaced by sheltered accommodation) and Belvedere House (replaced in the 1970s by the Park Royal flats). Other blocks of flats were built in that decade on spare land on Montpelier Terrace and Clifton Terrace.

== Buildings ==
=== Churches ===
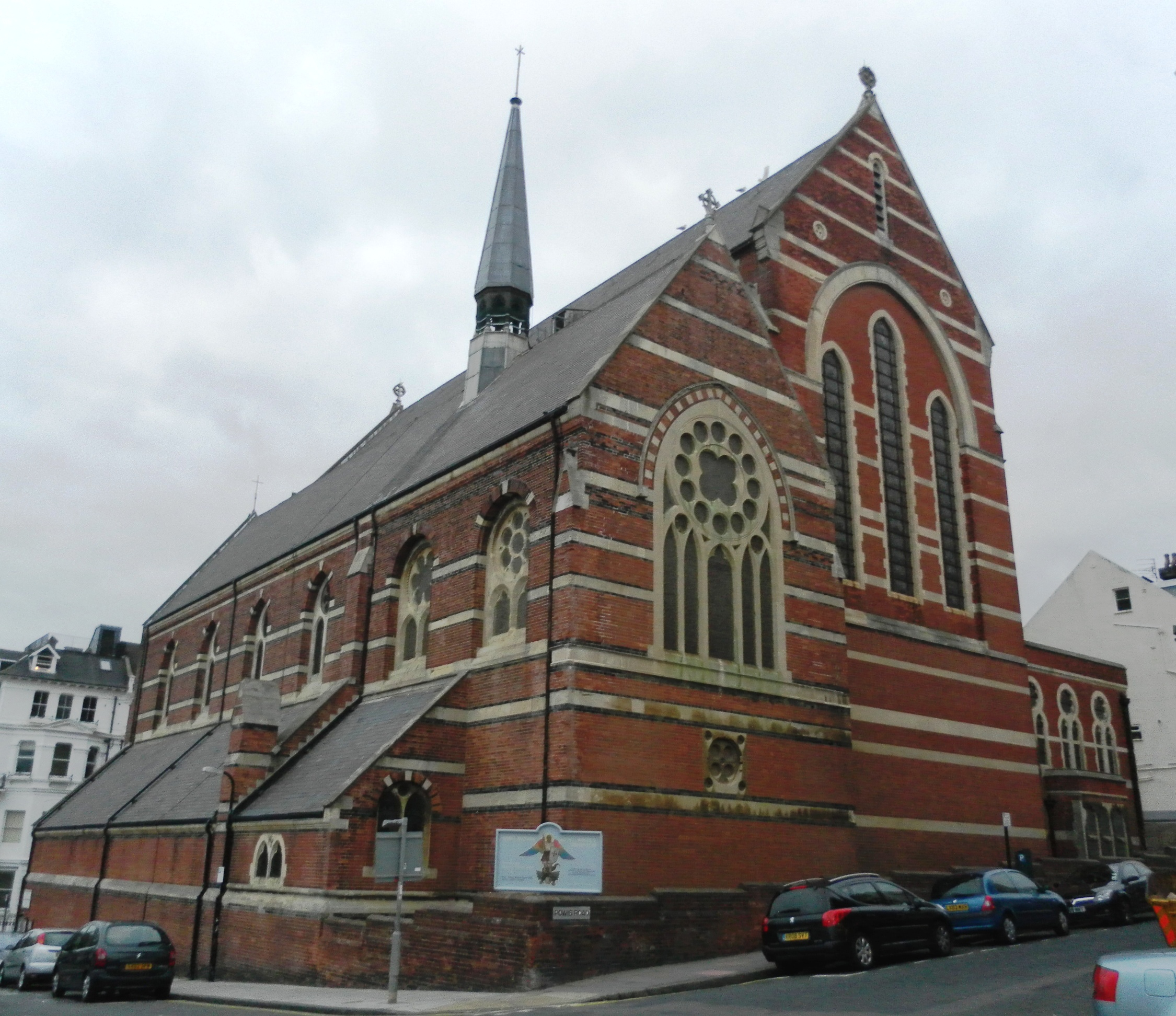
St Michael and All Angels Church was built in two stages between 1858 and 1895.

The Montpelier and Clifton Hill areas have four extant churches and one former church building which is now in secular use. Three of these buildings have listed status. Another five churches were demolished in the postwar period.

The Anglican St Michael and All Angels Church has been a centre of Anglo-Catholicism and high church worship since it opened in 1861. It was one of several daughter churches planted out of St Paul's Church in the early Victorian era. George Frederick Bodley designed the original building on behalf of his friend Rev. Charles Beanlands, a curate at St Paul's, and work started in 1858. William Burges then supplied plans for an extension in 1865, but these were not executed until 1893–95 by J.S. Chapple, an architect from the recently deceased Burges' office. The two parts are connected by a four-bay arcade inside, and Bodley's original nave has become an aisle. The building is a tall red-brick and stone Gothic Revival structure with traceried lancet windows. The internal fittings combine "grandeur and artistry in a most satisfying way", and the 19th-century stained glass has been called the best in Sussex. The church is Grade I-listed.

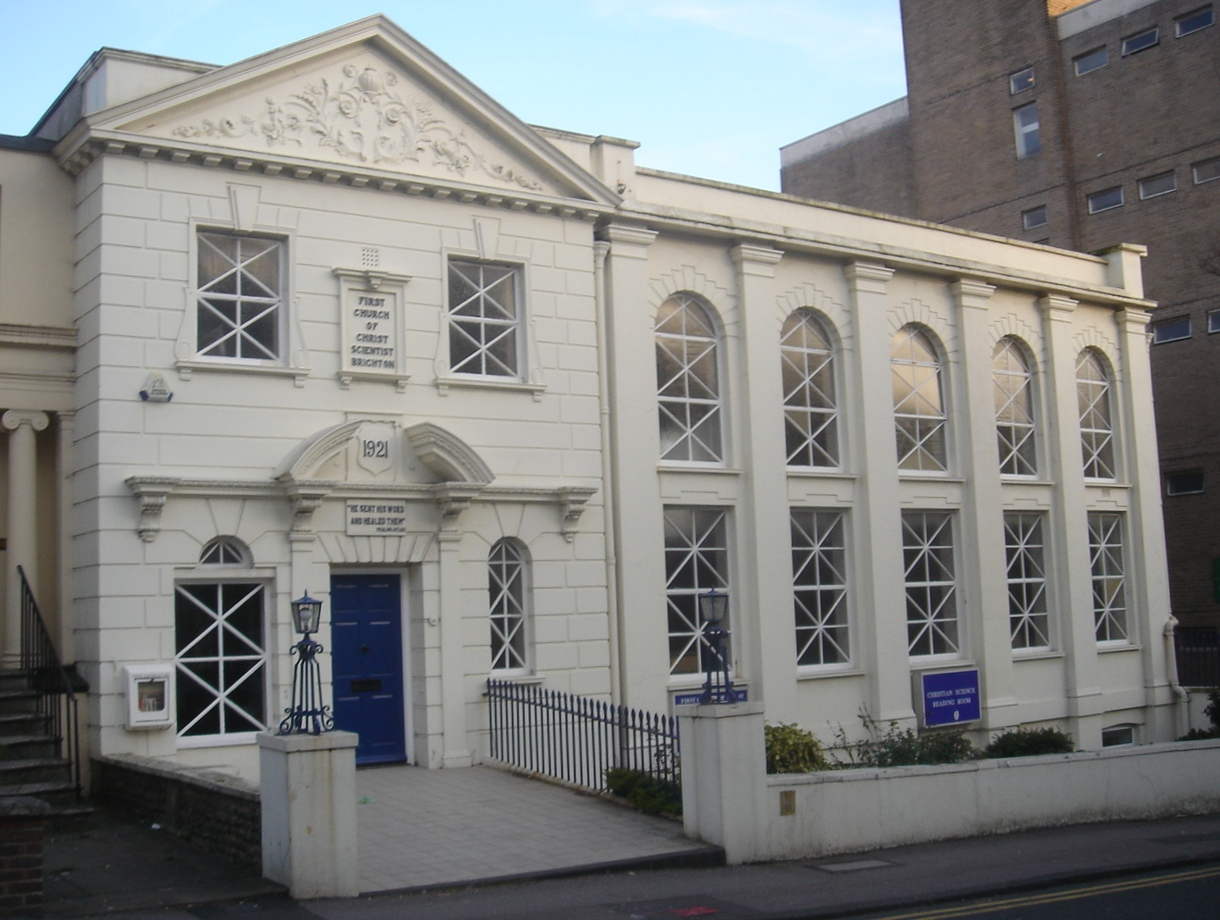
Clayton & Black converted a house into the First Church of Christ, Scientist in 1921.

St Mary Magdalen's Church, another brick and stone Gothic Revival building, was designed for the area's Roman Catholics in 1861–64 by Gilbert Blount. Frederick Walters added a complementary school and presbytery in 1871 and 1891 respectively, and the complex takes up a large site on Upper North Street. A tall tower with a landmark broach spire stands almost separated from the Decorated Gothic nave and chancel. The interior has contrasting stone (intricately carved to Blount's designs) and marble, and Joseph Cribb carved the effigies of Saint Joseph and Saint George which flank the entrance. St Mary Magdalen's has Grade II-listed status.

The First Church of Christ, Scientist, serving the city's Christian Scientists, is a "notable" former house on Montpelier Road. It was built in the early 1850s and was converted into a church by local architects Clayton & Black in 1921. The exterior is rusticated and has an elaborate pediment and large pilasters flanking the tiered windows. A panelled gallery survives inside.

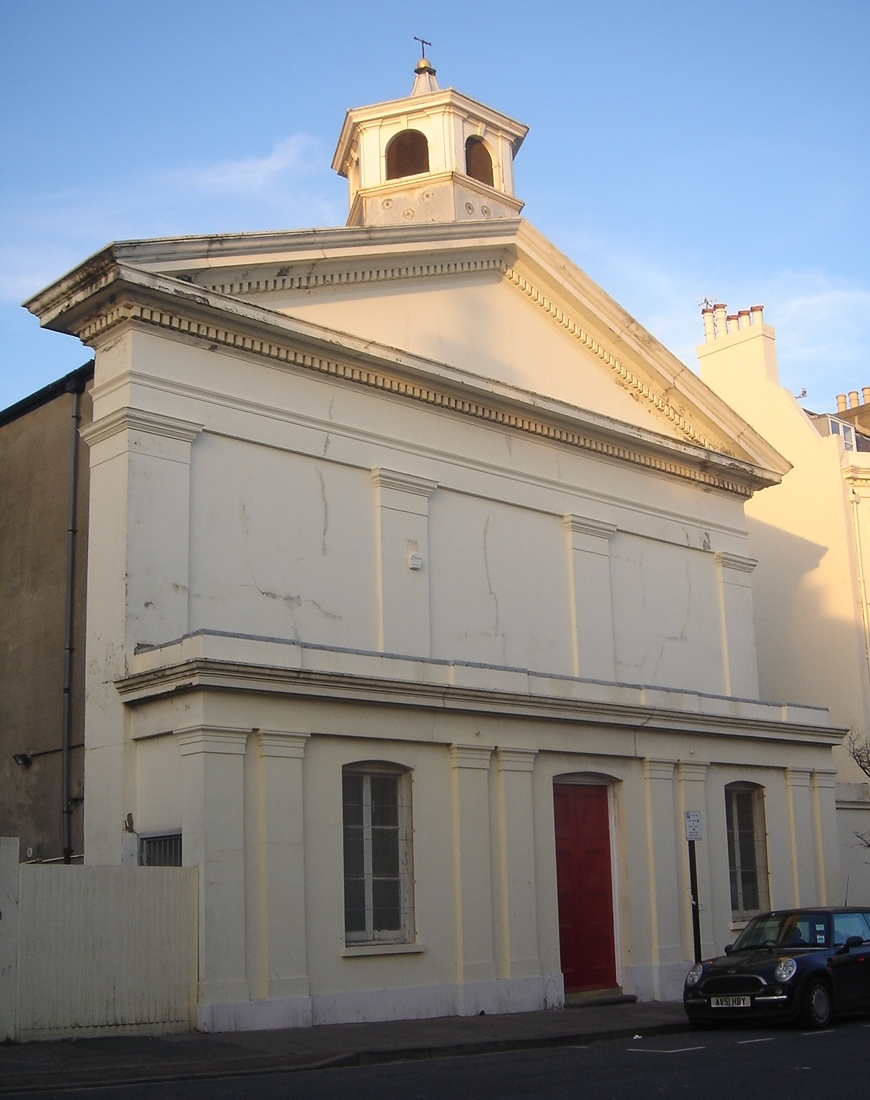
The former St Stephen's Church is now a daycare centre.

Brighton & Hove Central Spiritualist Church is based in a building on Boundary Passage. (Note: Boundary Passage forms part of the ancient boundary between Brighton and Hove. It runs northwards from Western Road to Montpelier Place, parallel with Borough Street to the west and Temple Street to the east.) It was registered for marriages in April 1984. The church previously occupied part of a house on Norfolk Terrace, for which a worship registration granted in April 1966 was revoked in February 1980.

The Grade II*-listed former St Stephen's Church on Montpelier Place closed in 1939 and is now used as a day centre for homeless people. George Cheesman designed the plain stuccoed Classical façade, with Doric pilasters and an octagonal lantern, in 1851. Behind it lies the opulent former ballroom of the Castle Inn, built by John Crunden in 1776 and later transported to Montpelier Place. Arthur Blomfield made additions to the church in 1889. It was refurbished after a fire in 1988.

Christ Church stood on Montpelier Road south of Western Road between 1837 and 1982. George Cheesman designed it and Edmund Scott undertook restoration in 1886; both architects worked on other local churches as well. The Gothic Revival building had a galleried interior and a spire matching that at Chichester Cathedral. It was gutted in an arson attack in 1978; the exterior survived, but it was demolished in 1982 in favour of the International/Modern-style Christ Church House flats. The congregation of the church moved to nearby St Patrick's Church.

The Dials Congregational Church stood at the junction of Clifton Road and Dyke Road (the site of the present Homelees House) between 1870 and 1972, although it closed in 1969. Its 150-foot (46 m) "Rhenish helm"-topped clock tower was prominent on the skyline, and behind was a large horseshoe-shaped auditorium. The Romanesque Revival building, described as "uncouth" by Nikolaus Pevsner, was designed by local architect Thomas Simpson. Work on Homelees House, a sheltered housing scheme, began in 1985.

Norfolk Road Methodist Church, designed by C.O. Ellison, stood on Norfolk Road from 1868 until 1965. It was a large Early English/Decorated Gothic Revival flint and stone building with a tower and spire, and it had an extensive array of stained glass. Externally and internally—where the main aisle led the eye to the central altar, and the lectern and pulpit stood to one side—there was little to distinguish it from an Anglican church, and it was known as the "Methodist Cathedral of the South". Demographic changes meant the congregation dwindled, and the church closed in 1964 and was demolished the following year to be replaced by Braemar House, a large block of flats with a "bland red-brick façade".

E. Joseph Wood's Montpelier Place Baptist Church of 1966–67 was built on the site of the former Emanuel Reformed Episcopal Church. The low brown-brick building stood on a corner site at the south-west end of Norfolk Terrace, straddling the ancient parish boundary. There were echoes of Coventry Cathedral in the treatment of the façade, which had two gabled bays linked by an arcaded wall with a sawtooth-style roof. Each bay had vertical rows of recessed bricks. A flat-roofed church hall adjoined. The church closed in 2012, was squatted in 2014 and was proposed for demolition and replacement with flats in 2017. Demolition took place soon after planning permission was granted in October 2017.

=== Other public buildings ===
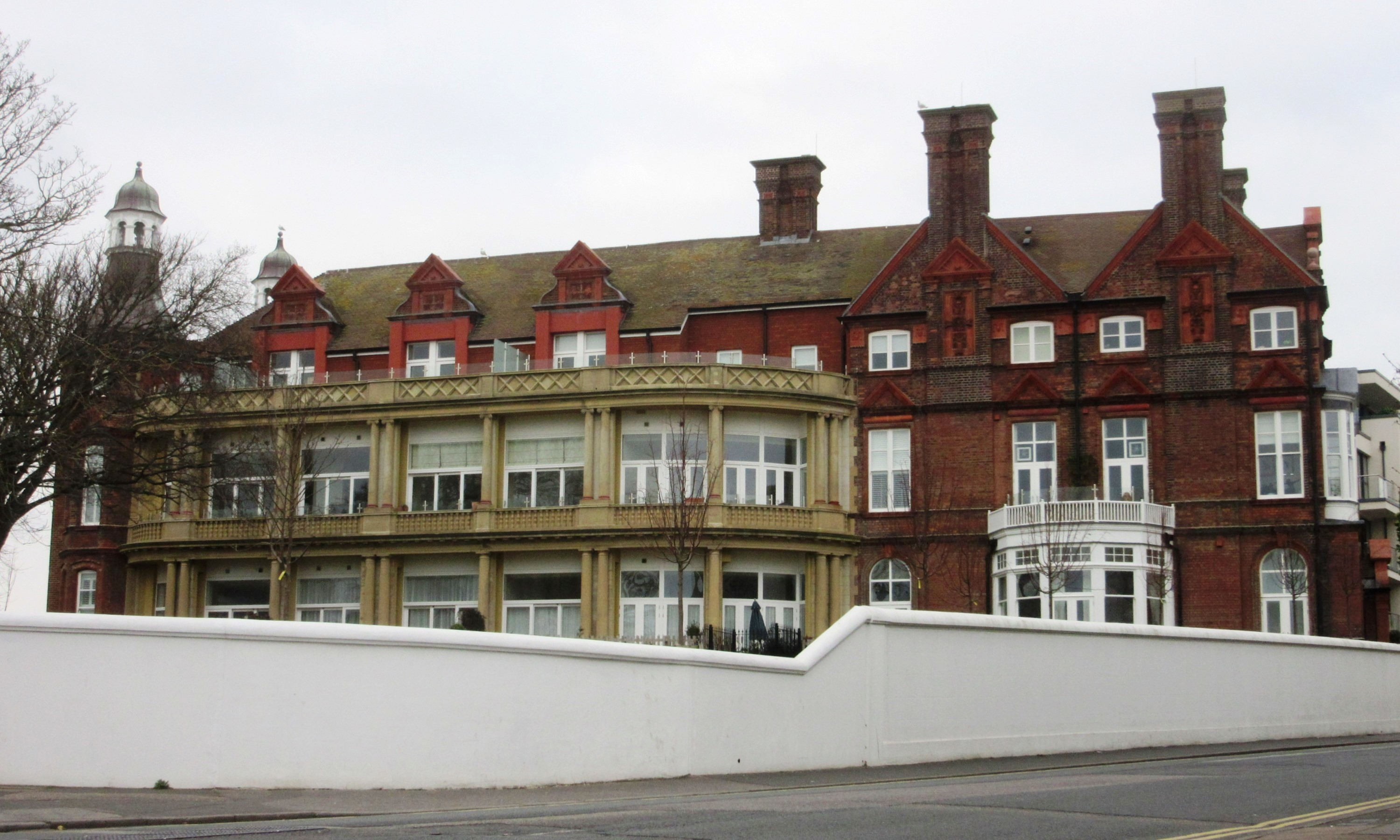
Thomas Lainson designed the former children's hospital on Dyke Road.

The Royal Alexandra Hospital for Sick Children, "an important part of Brighton life and a well known local landmark", was officially opened on 21 July 1881 and was used until 22 June 2007, when a new children's hospital opened on the Royal Sussex County Hospital campus elsewhere in the city. Designed by Thomas Lainson, it was a three-storey Queen Anne-style building of red brick with terracotta dressings and mouldings, enlivened by Dutch gables, cupolas and a moulded cartouche. Extensions included a colonnade of balconies (later enclosed) by the Clayton & Black firm in 1906 and a Vernacular-style recessed wing of two storeys in 1927–28, partly tile-hung and with timber decoration to the gables. The first mention of its potential closure came in 2001, when the Government allocated £28 million towards new facilities at the Royal Sussex County Hospital on Eastern Road in Kemptown. By 2004, it seemed likely that the building would be demolished and the site redeveloped with luxury flats. Montpelier residents were unsuccessful in their attempt to get the former hospital listed by English Heritage, who stated that Lainson's original design had been altered so much that much of its character had been lost. Taylor Wimpey, a housebuilding company, bought the hospital in December 2006, but their proposals to clear the site and build a combined residential development and GP surgery were refused twice by the city council, in 2007 and 2008. In 2009 Taylor Wimpey appealed against the latest refusal to grant planning permission for 149 flats and a four-day public inquiry was held at Brighton Town Hall in May 2009. The local conservation group, the Montpelier and Clifton Hill Association, led the opposition to Taylor Wimpey's plans to demolish the hospital. The planning inspector, John Papworth, turned down Taylor Wimpey's appeal, praising the architectural quality of Thomas Lainson's main building. "I consider that the main block and particularly its southern façade and the southern end of the Dyke Road frontage contribute positively to the character and appearance of the conservation area", said Papworth. In 2010 Taylor Wimpey abandoned its plans to clear the site and put forward a compromise plan, which kept the main Lainson building but demolished the later ancillary buildings on the site. This plan, which was supported by the Montpelier and Clifton Hill Association was approved by the council in 2011. Flats on the site went on sale (marketed as Royal Alexandra Quarter) in 2012. The iconic main hospital building, to be called the Lainson building, is currently being restored and converted to provide 20 flats.

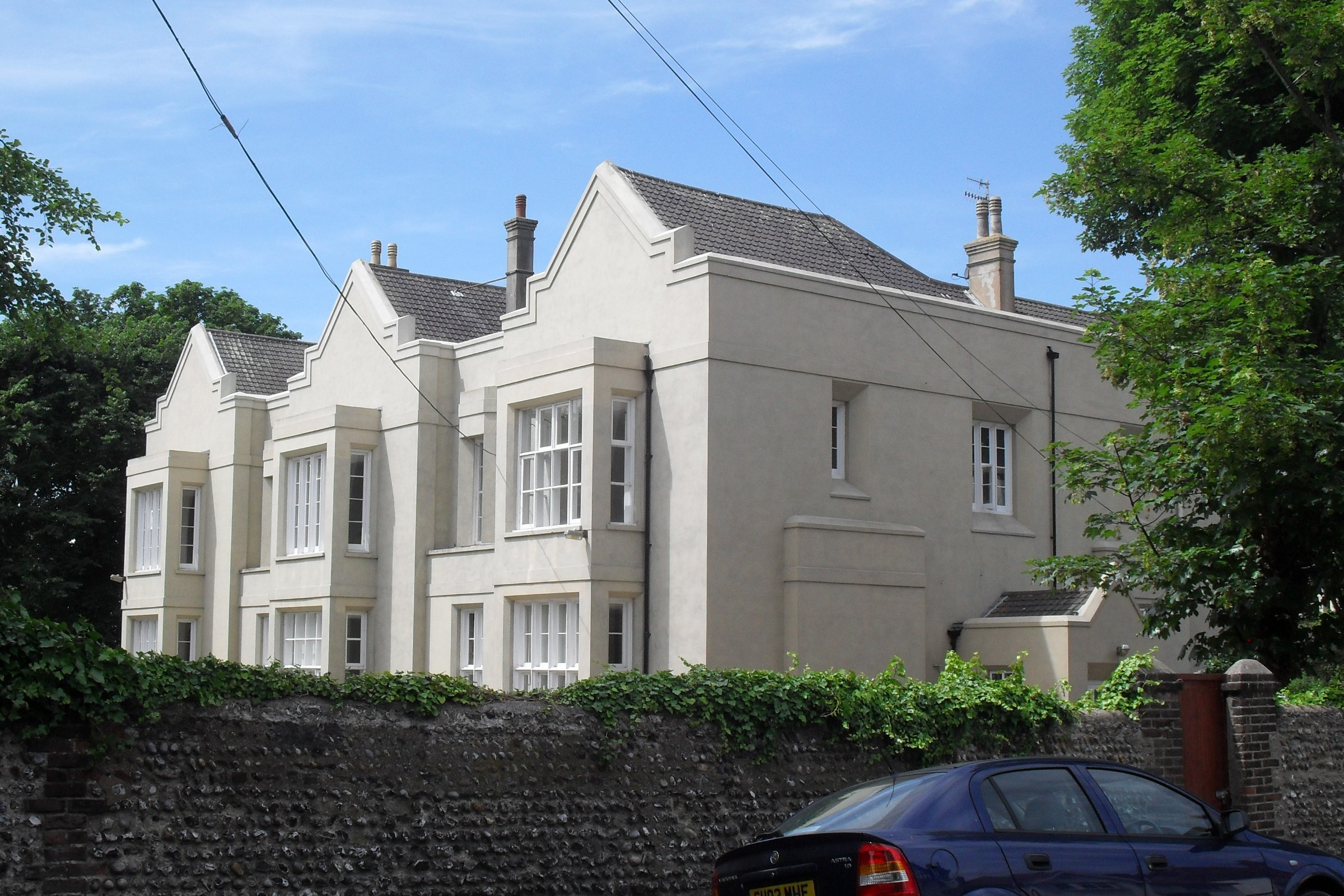
Brighton and Hove High School's sixth-form is in the former Brighton vicarage.

The Temple, now the main part of Brighton and Hove High School, was built in 1818–19 by Amon Wilds or his son Amon Henry Wilds, and has been described as "certainly exotic enough for their tastes". The Wilds, along with Charles Busby, were the three architects most closely associated with the development of Brighton and Hove in the Regency era and the exuberant, confident and strongly planned architecture which still characterises the city. The Temple was an early commission: they only moved to Brighton in 1814. The north and east walls retain their original appearance: long colonnades are formed by a series of arches on top of paired vertical features of "bizarre form". These have unusual capitals and have been described as resembling Egyptian-style pilasters or engaged columns. The west and south façades also had these, but the building was drastically altered in 1911–12: the domed roof was replaced by a mansard, a curious central spiral staircase housed in a cylindrical structure was removed, and chimneys were taken away. The dimensions of the building match those of Solomon's Temple in Jerusalem. The Temple is a Grade II listed building, and the large flint and brick wall surrounding the building is also listed at Grade II; it is decorated with stone lion heads. An extension was also built at the southwest corner in 1891.

Junior pupils shared the building with the senior school until 1904, after which they moved several times: to Norfolk Terrace, Montpelier Crescent, the former vicarage (in 1922) and finally to new facilities in Hove. The former vicarage is now the school's sixth-form. George Cheesman & Son designed it on behalf of Vicar of Brighton Henry Michell Wagner in 1834–35; it is a stuccoed building with prominent gables and windows with mullions and transoms. An ornate staircase survives inside.

=== Residential squares and terraces ===
==== Clifton Terrace ====
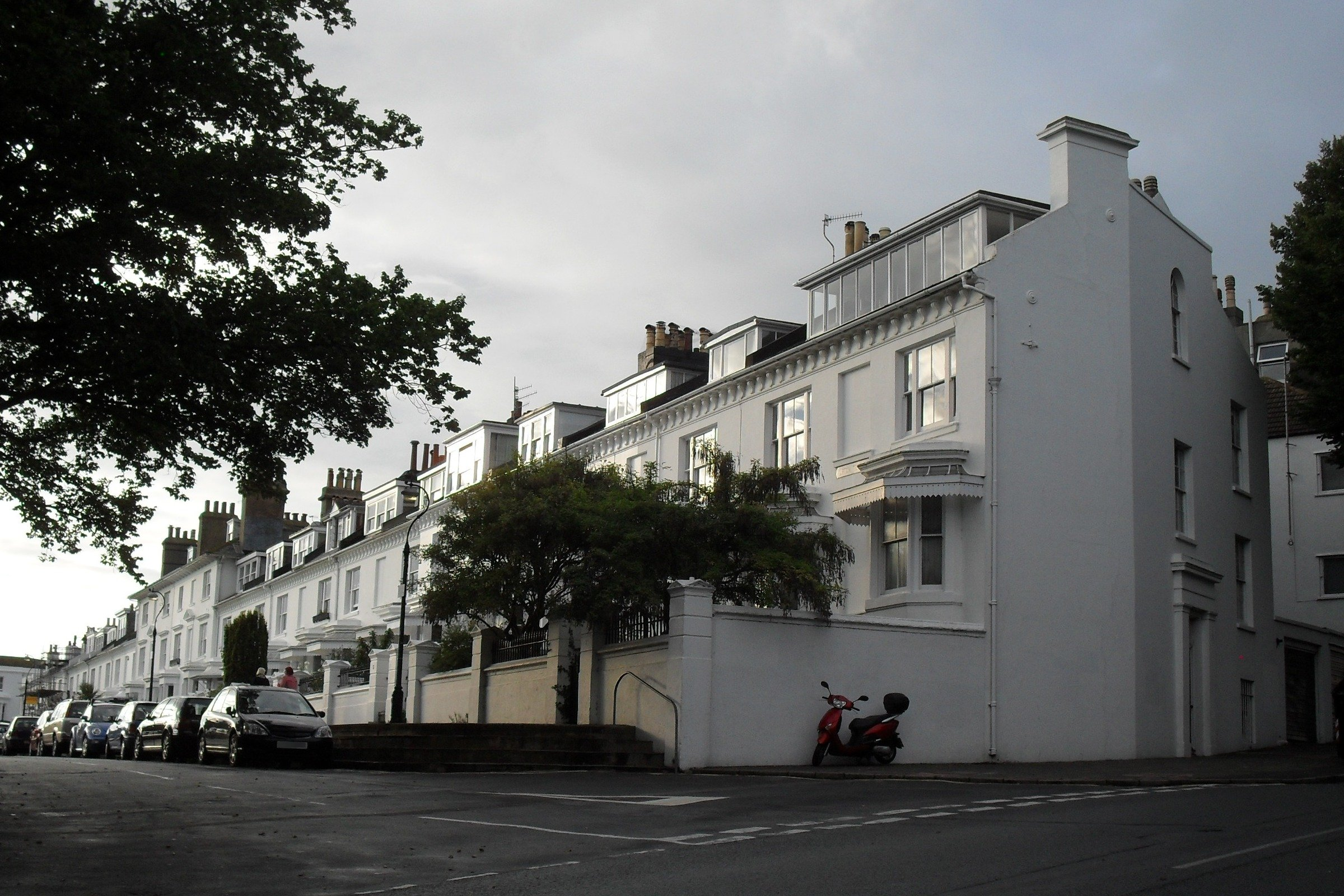
Clifton Terrace sits behind a raised pavement.

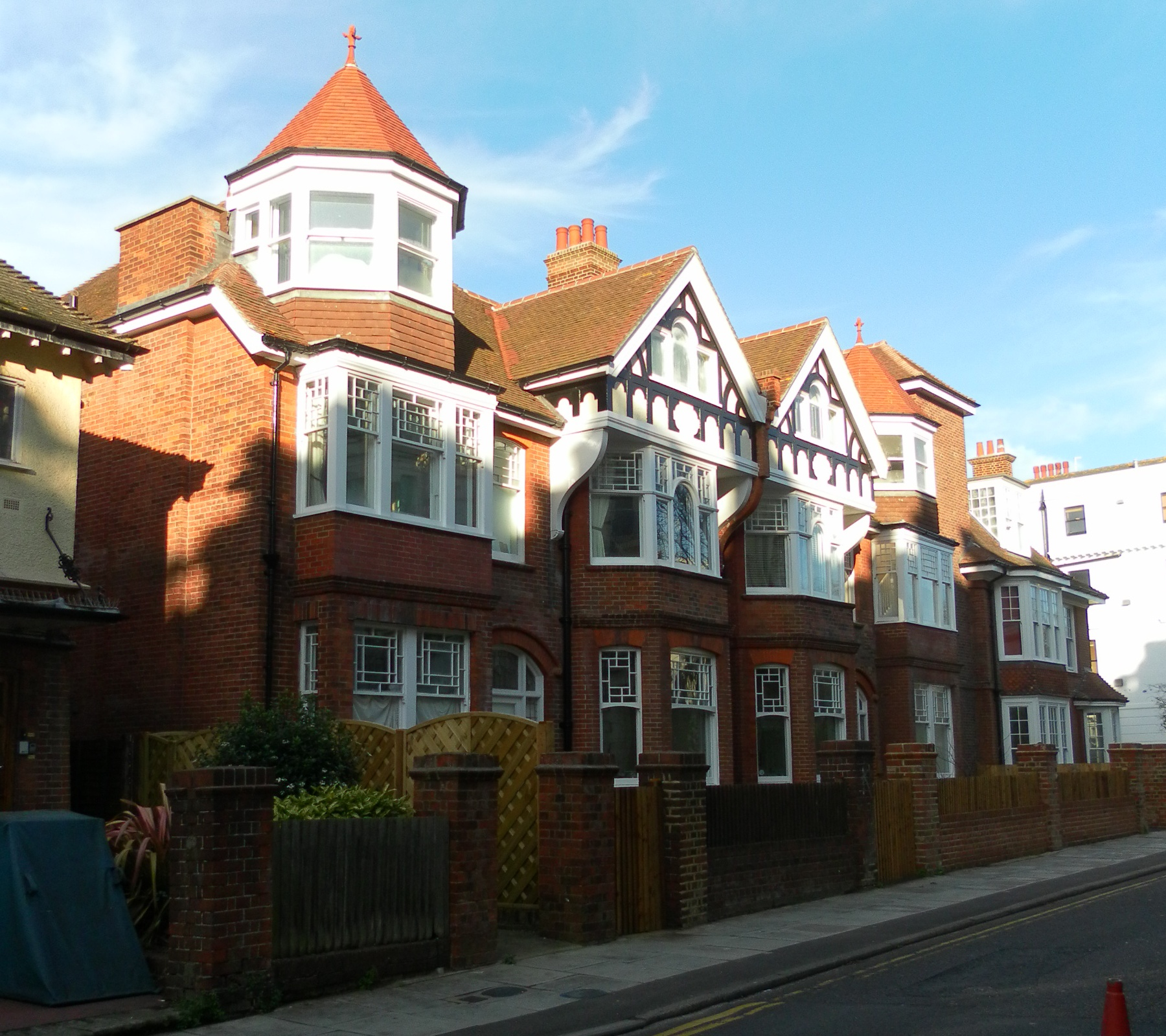
The west side of Denmark Terrace (Vernon Gardens) has some early 20th-century red-brick houses.

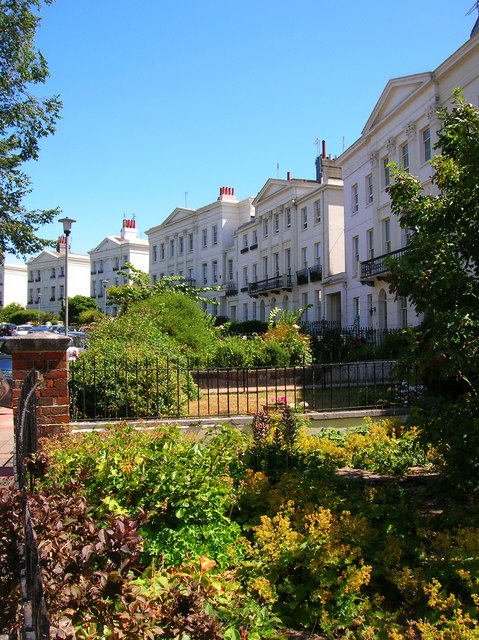
Montpelier Crescent's houses have prominent pediments.

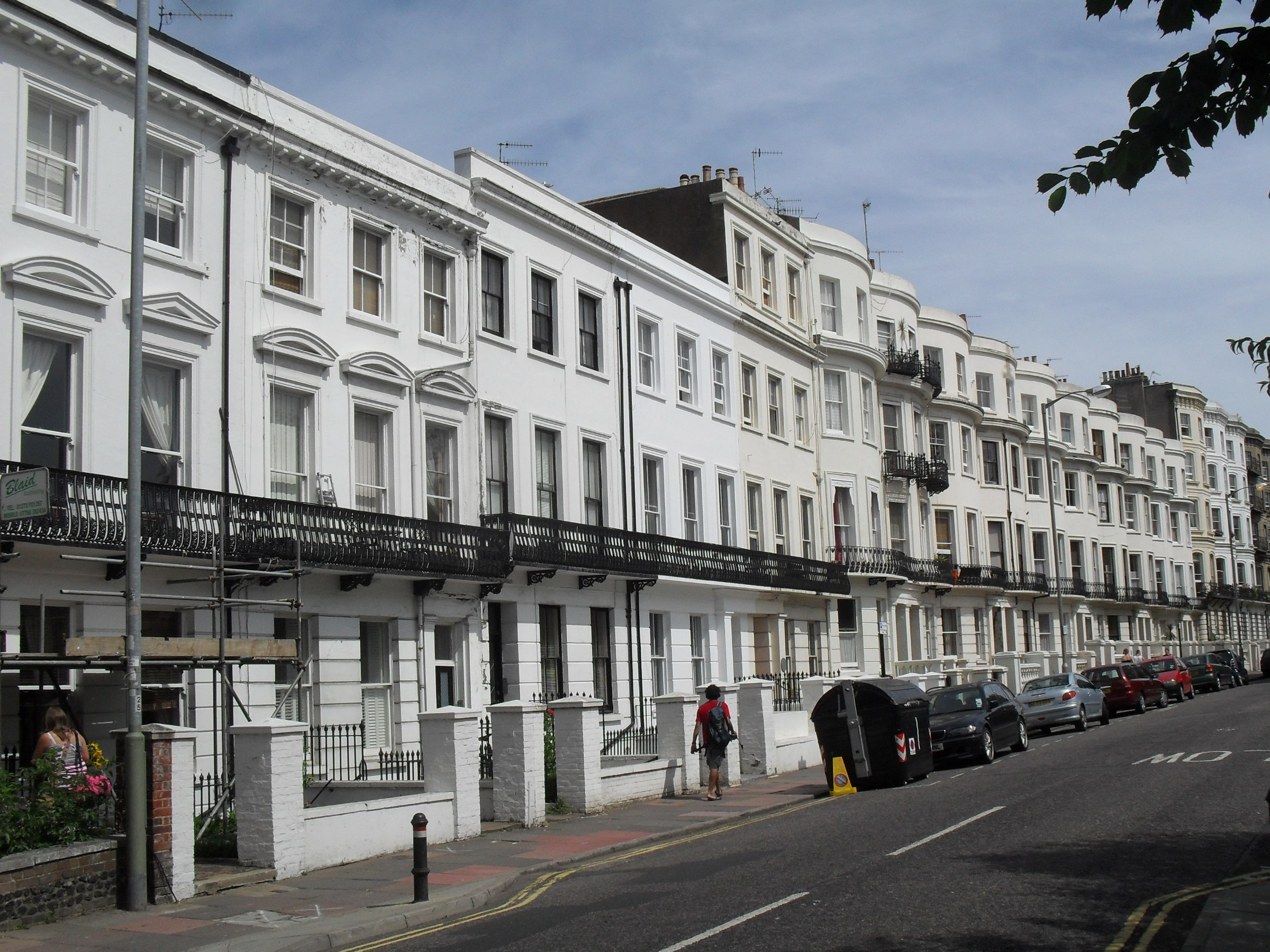
Vernon Terrace has houses of various heights.

This runs east–west across the slope of the hill, and has private gardens on the site of the former windmill which moved to Albion Hill in 1837. Most construction work took place in 1846–47, but the 23-house terrace and its gardens were not finished until 1851. The houses combine the Regency-style "gaiety and exuberance" with the "charm and vigour" of Victorian architecture, and the use of angled bay windows set below tented canopies is a late example of this distinctive local practice. Each house is built as a villa, mostly with a three-window range shared across two neighbouring houses (the middle window is blank). Numbers 12–14 project slightly and are taller. The houses are raised above the roadway, giving views into the private gardens on the south side and "a commanding view of the sea". Number 25, which stands separately and was also listed, was originally the Clifton Arms pub.

==== Denmark Terrace ====
The "heavy Italianate detailing" of the large four-storey bay-fronted houses on the east side identifies them as 1860s buildings. There are prominent cornices and pairs of porches whose style is reminiscent of the work of 18th-century architect James Gibbs, and some houses are also linked by iron balconies on the top floor (a balcony runs along the whole length of the terrace at first-floor level). "Cheery" red-brick Edwardian houses face the terrace.

==== Montpelier Crescent ====
Described as "the one great showpiece of the area" and "the grandest of [Amon Henry Wilds'] many works", this crescent was developed over about 12 years from 1843. The main section, numbers 7–31, was built between 1843 and 1847 and is Grade II*-listed. A further 13 houses (listed at Grade II) were added in four blocks, two at each end, in about 1855. The houses are arranged as linked villas, alternating between triplets and pairs: this layout is unique, and the placement of the crescent to face inland towards the South Downs rather than the sea is also unusual. Most houses are of five bays with a central pediment. Recessed entrances, Corinthian pilasters topped by ammonite capitals and decorative mouldings characterise the houses. The gardens in front of the crescent are an important area of open space within the conservation area.

==== Montpelier Villas ====
Ten pairs of "delightful" semi-detached villas, five on each side of the road, make up this mid-1840s development by Amon Henry Wilds. They are in the Italianate style with influences of Regency architecture, and have two bow windows with bonnet-style canopies above, stuccoed walls with extensive rustication, prominently bracketed eaves and cast iron balconies. The "charming" houses are set in spacious plots in a former bluebell wood. The street was completed over the course of three years from about 1845. All of the villas are listed buildings.

==== Norfolk Terrace, Norfolk Road and Belvedere Terrace ====
Norfolk Terrace is an 1850s development. On the west side, the first (northernmost) 13 houses are a tall terrace by Thomas Lainson, arranged as four pairs of flat-fronted houses with a wider central elevation whose windows are large and round-arched. The building is in the Italianate style. South of that, the next six houses (with segmental bay windows and cast iron balconies) have become the Abbey Hotel. Belvedere Terrace, built in 1852 for Mary Wagner, forms part of the east side of the road. It has four storeys, bow windows and balconies at first-floor level. Two blocks of flats now occupy the site of Belvedere House, demolished in 1965, but its cobbled flint garden wall survives. Various smaller-scale houses, some of which are listed, line Norfolk Road, which developed between the 1830s and the 1860s; canted bay windows and cast iron balconies are characteristic features. The street used to be called Chalybeate Street.

==== Powis Grove, Road, Square and Villas ====
Powis Square is a rare example in Brighton of a fully enclosed inland square: most such developments are on the seafront, and its architectural details and scale are similar to these. It is horseshoe-shaped, and one side is formed by Powis Road. The square was developed by John Yearsley over a few years around 1850: the leasehold to the land was granted on 17 September 1846, and in 1852 seven people had moved in and another 14 houses were built but unoccupied. In some cases façades were built first and the structure of the house came later. A builder called Stephen Davey was responsible for many of the houses, which were originally planned to be flat-fronted but which were given bow fronts when built. They rise to three storeys and have features of Georgian, Victorian and Palladian design. A small garden in the centre of the square, taken over by Brighton Corporation in 1887, enhances its intimate scale. Powis Road's houses are not listed, unlike those of Powis Square, and were built a decade later. They also have three storeys, and their façades have canted bay windows and cast iron balconies. St Michael and All Angels Church stands at the southern end. Powis Grove leads through to the east side of Powis Square and has various buildings of the mid 19th-century, and Powis Villas has some listed detached and semi-detached houses of the 1850s and a short terrace with a long canopied veranda.

==== Vernon Terrace ====
This long, tall terrace of houses blocked the view of the South Downs that Montpelier Crescent had when it was first built. Along with the crescent, it forms "a townscape of outstanding quality". Only the west side of the road has houses, as the open space outside Montpelier Crescent fronts the east side. The terrace is in two parts: that to the south dates from the 1850s and is Grade II-listed in two parts. Numbers 1–6 have been dated to about 1860 and rise to three storeys (except numbers 1 and 6, which have an extra storey). Their individual detailing is slightly different, but pilastered doorcases, architraves, first-floor cast iron balconies and small pediments above the windows are common themes. Numbers 7–16 date from 1856 to 1857 and are each of four storeys with a three-window range; there is a mixture of bow windows and canted bays. Many windows have architraves and cornices, and there are bow-fronted cast iron balconies at first-floor level (and to the second and third floors at number 8).

=== Windmills ===
Vine's Mill, a post mill, only took that name in 1818. William Vine moved to the area from Patcham, where he had previously been a miller, in August 1818, having bought the mill at a recent auction. A house came with the windmill; it survives under the name "Rose Cottage" on Vine Place, which also took its name from him (it was previously called Mill Place). A storm in 1828 damaged the mill, but it was repaired. It was the subject of two paintings by Constable in the 1820s and a locally famous watercolour by Henry Bodle, who married into the Vine family, in 1843. By this time Vine had died and the mill had been bought by Edward Cuttress of Round Hill. It was demolished in 1849 or 1850, and the gardens at 6 and 7 Powis Villas now occupy the site.

A second windmill stood nearby and has been confused with Vine's Mill in some sources. It is missed off most maps and has been called "something of an enigma". It was a fan-tailed post mill, larger than Vine's Mill and of a more modern design—although one historian (Note: F. Bramwell, The Windmills of Brighton—a series of articles in the Brighton Herald newspaper in August 1938.) stated that it existed in 1780. It did not receive an official name until the mid-19th century, by which time it had been moved to Windmill Street on Albion Hill in the Carlton Hill area of Brighton: because it had stood where the private gardens of Clifton Terrace were later built, it became known as the Clifton Gardens Mill. The Windmill Inn on Upper North Street, licensed in 1828, is close to the site of both mills; sources disagree on which one it was named after.

=== The Coach House ===
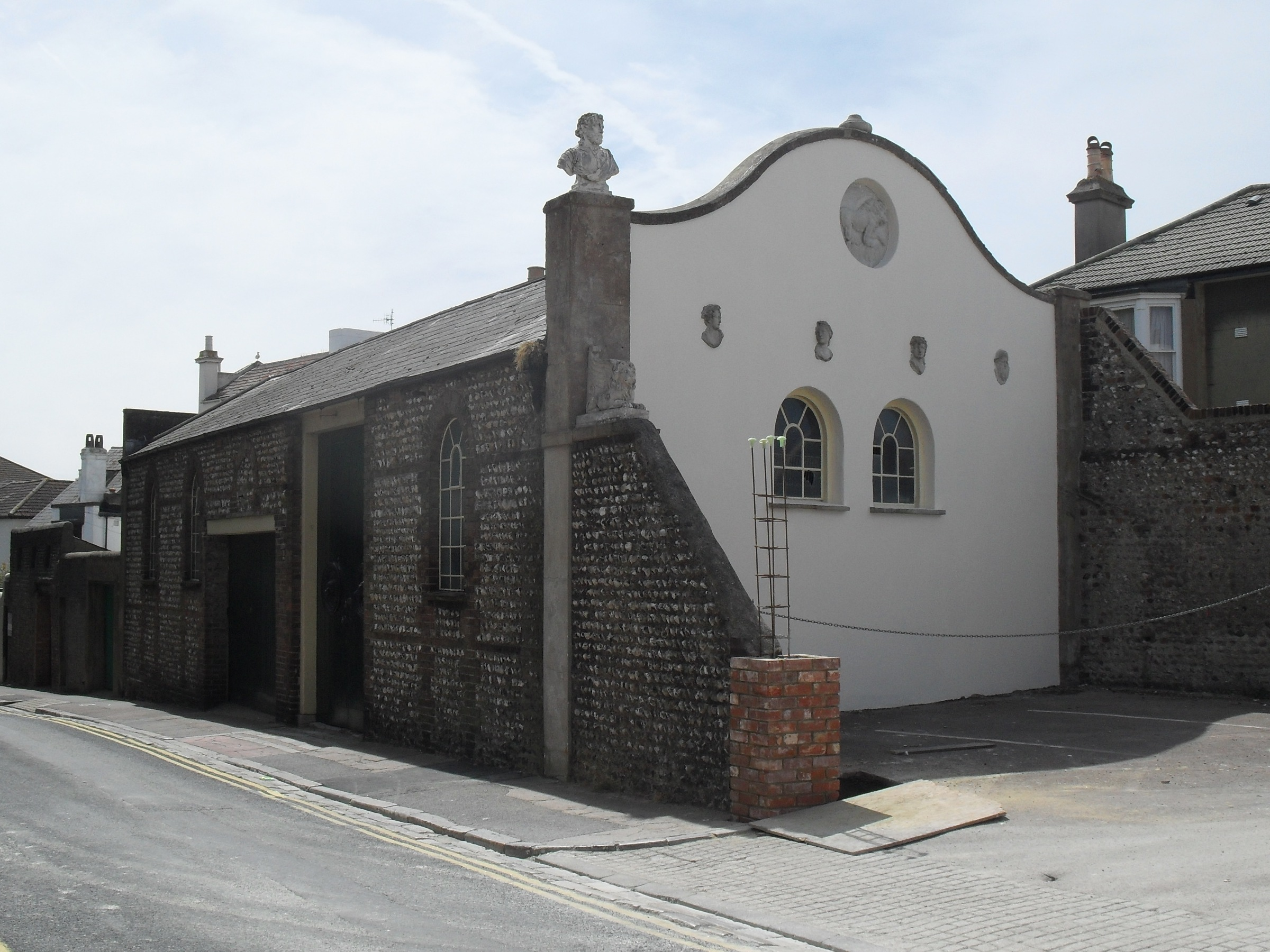
The Coach House, a "rare survival", dates from 1852.

Now a Grade II listed building, The Coach House stands on Clifton Hill. It was built as the coach house of Aberdeen Lodge (now 5 Powis Villas). Statue-maker Joseph Rogers Browne built this house for himself, along with the neighbouring villas at numbers 6 and 7. He later wanted accommodation for his carriages, so in 1852 he erected the brick, flint and stucco building with space for two coaches and three horses. There was also a hay loft and a separate room for the coachman, and the exterior had Coade stone decoration. By the 1920s it had become a garage; in 1937, after this closed, the Royal Alexandra Children's Hospital bought it and used it to store their ambulances. Local conservationists set up a limited company, which bought the building in 2006, intending to turn it into a community centre and museum; but it was repossessed in 2008 and was thereafter used for storage by a clothes shop. In its assessment of the building's architectural importance when granting listed status in 2005, English Heritage described it as a "substantially intact and rare survival" with "polite architectural and sculptural features".

== Heritage and conservation area ==
A building or structure is defined as "listed" when it is placed on a statutory register of buildings of "special architectural or historic interest" by the Secretary of State for Culture, Media and Sport, a Government department, in accordance with the Planning (Listed Buildings and Conservation Areas) Act 1990. English Heritage, a non-departmental public body, acts as an agency of this department to administer the process and advise the department on relevant issues. As of February 2001, there were 24 listed buildings with Grade I status, 70 Grade II*-listed and 1,124 Grade II-listed buildings in Brighton and Hove. Grade I-listed buildings are defined as being of "exceptional interest" and greater than national importance; Grade II*, the next highest status, is used for "particularly important buildings of more than special interest"; and the lowest grade, Grade II, is used for "nationally important buildings of special interest". Many of Montpelier's buildings are listed: in 1981, 320 individual buildings (Note: In many cases, two or more individual buildings are covered by a single listing: for example, the 38 houses of Montpelier Crescent are accounted for by five separate listings.) were covered by an English Heritage listing, and the figure in 2010 was 351.

In the United Kingdom, a conservation area is a principally urban area "of special architectural or historic interest, the character or appearance of which it is desirable to preserve or enhance". Such areas are identified by local authorities according to criteria defined by Sections 69 and 70 of the Planning (Listed Buildings and Conservation Areas) Act 1990. The Montpelier & Clifton Hill conservation area, one of 34 in the city of Brighton and Hove, was created in 1973. Its boundaries were extended in 1977, and it now covers 75.4 acres (30.5 ha).

== Notable residents ==
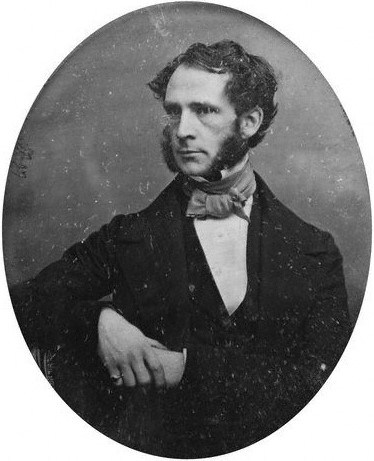
Frederick William Robertson lived at two houses in Montpelier near the end of his life.

Many famous people have lived in Montpelier. Sarah Forbes Bonetta, an African princess who became a favourite of Queen Victoria, lived at 17 Clifton Hill prior to her marriage at St Nicholas Church in 1862 to a merchant who lived at Victoria Road; she was unhappy in Brighton, describing the house as a "desolate little pigsty". Frederick William Robertson, a preacher, theologian and divine whose ministry at Brighton's Holy Trinity Church was nationally famous, lived at 9 Montpelier Terrace from 1847 until 1850, then at 60 Montpelier Road until his death in 1853. Another resident of Montpelier Road was Dr William King, an important figure in the British cooperative movement, who owned number 23. Eleanor Marx lived at 6 Vernon Terrace for a time in the late 19th century. Screenwriter Edward Knoblock's home was at 20 Clifton Terrace, and another resident of that street was playwright and author Alan Melville: he lived at number 17 from 1951 until 1973 and then at 28 Victoria Street until his death in 1983. Author Francis King lived at 17 Montpelier Villas, close to the 5 Powis Grove home of former MP Thomas Skeffington-Lodge. He look legal action after noticing an "unflattering" resemblance to himself in King's 1970 novel A Domestic Animal; King had to sell his house to pay the legal costs after losing the case. Journalist and television personality Gilbert Harding—"the most-watched man on British television" during the 1950s—lived at 20 Montpelier Villas until his death in 1960. Bandleader Ray Noble's birthplace, 1 Montpelier Terrace, has a blue plaque commemorating his time in Brighton.

== Bibliography ==
- Antram, Nicholas; Morrice, Richard (2008). Brighton and Hove. Pevsner Architectural Guides. London: Yale University Press. ISBN 978-0-300-12661-7.
- Berry, Sue (2005). Georgian Brighton. Chichester: Phillimore & Co. Ltd. ISBN 1-86077-342-7.
- Body, Geoffrey (1984). Railways of the Southern Region. PSL Field Guides. Cambridge: Patrick Stephens Ltd. ISBN 0-85059-664-5.
- Brighton Polytechnic. School of Architecture and Interior Design (1987). A Guide to the Buildings of Brighton. Macclesfield: McMillan Martin. ISBN 1-869865-03-0.
- Carder, Timothy (1990). The Encyclopaedia of Brighton. Lewes: East Sussex County Libraries. ISBN 0-86147-315-9.
- Collis, Rose (2010). The New Encyclopaedia of Brighton. (based on the original by Tim Carder) (1st ed.). Brighton: Brighton & Hove Libraries. ISBN 978-0-9564664-0-2.
- Elleray, D. Robert (1981). The Victorian Churches of Sussex. Chichester: Phillimore & Co. ISBN 0-85033-378-4.
- Elleray, D. Robert (2004). Sussex Places of Worship. Worthing: Optimus Books. ISBN 0-9533132-7-1.
- Gilbert, Edmund M. (1975) [1954]. Brighton: Old Ocean's Bauble. Hassocks: Flare Books. ISBN 0-901759-39-2.
- Hickman, Michael R. (2007). A Story to Tell: 200 Years of Methodism in Brighton and Hove. Brighton: Brighton and Hove Methodist Circuit. ISBN 978-0-9556506-0-4.
- Leslie, Kim; Short, Brian, eds. (1999). An Historical Atlas of Sussex. Chichester: Phillimore & Co. ISBN 1-86077-112-2.
- Middleton, Judy (2002). The Encyclopaedia of Hove & Portslade. Brighton: Brighton & Hove Libraries.
- Musgrave, Clifford (1981). Life in Brighton. Rochester: Rochester Press. ISBN 0-571-09285-3.
- Myall, Steve (2008). The Victorian Development of the Clifton, Montpelier and Powis Estates of Brighton. Lewes: Pomegranate Press. ISBN 978-0-9559006-0-0.
- Nairn, Ian; Pevsner, Nikolaus (1965). The Buildings of England: Sussex. Harmondsworth: Penguin Books. ISBN 0-14-071028-0.
- Shipley, Berys J.M. (2001). The Lost Churches of Brighton and Hove. Worthing: Optimus Books. ISBN 0-9533132-5-5.
