= St Michael's Church, Brighton =

Church in Brighton, England

St. Michael and All Angels, Brighton
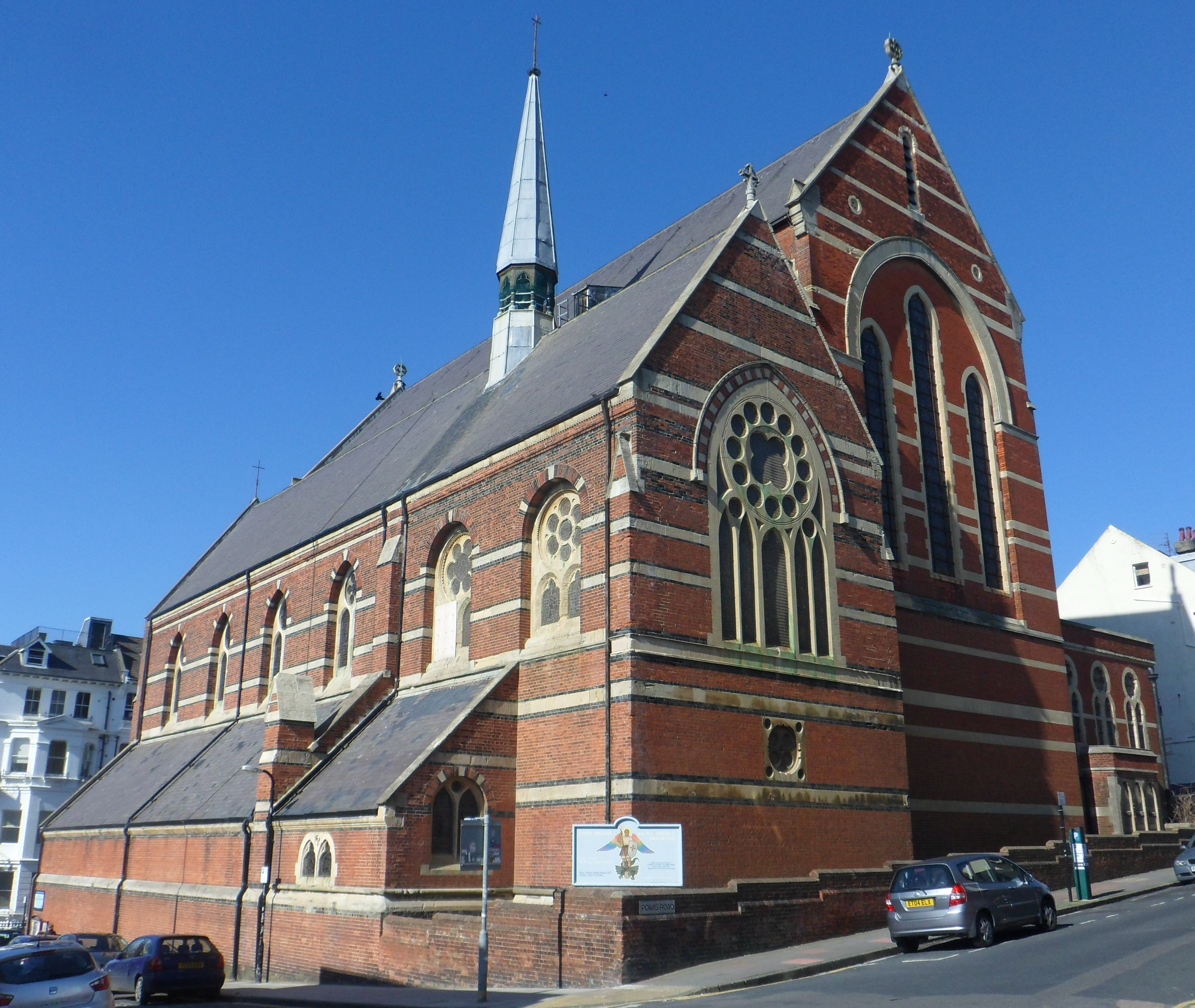
- The church from the southeast
- St. Michael and All Angels, Brighton
- 50°49′38.92″N 0°8′59.32″W
- Denomination: Church of England
- Churchmanship: Modern Catholic
- Website: www.saintmichaelsbrighton.com

History
- Dedication: St. Michael and All Angels with All Saints

Architecture
- Architect(s): George F. Bodley (original); William Burges (extension)
- Style: Gothic Revival style with Italianate elements
- Years built: 1860–1861 (original); 1893–1895 (extension)

Administration
- Province: Canterbury
- Diocese: Chichester
- Archdeaconry: Chichester
- Deanery: Brighton
- Parish: Brighton, S. Michael and All Angels

Clergy
- Vicar: Fr John Blackburne

Listed Building – Grade I
- Official name: Church of St Michael and All Angels and Attached Walls
- Designated: 20 August 1971
- Reference no.: 1381083

St. Michael's Church (in full, St. Michael and All Angels Church) is an Anglican church in Brighton, England, dating from the mid-Victorian era. Located on Victoria Road in the Montpelier area, to the east of Montpelier Road, it is one of the largest churches in the city of Brighton and Hove. The church is a Grade I listed building.

== Origins and the local area ==
The church serves the loosely defined Montpelier and Clifton Hill areas of Brighton, which lie west of the major Dyke Road and cover the steep slopes between the Seven Dials district and the seafront. St Stephen's Church had served parts of the district since 1851, when it had been moved to Montpelier Place from its previous location in Castle Square, close to the Royal Pavilion. However, it was not convenient for the area as a whole, with most of its parishioners being drawn instead from the streets to the south of the church.

Development of the Montpelier and Clifton Hill areas started in the 1820s, and by the 1840s they had essentially taken the form they remain in today, with a range of high-quality houses, many in the form of Regency terraces and crescents such as Clifton Terrace. However, one area of open land remained: at the time (the 1850s) it was known as Temple Fields, and consisted of a field, a pond and a partly built house. This was chosen as the site for a new church to serve the area. On present-day maps, Temple Fields is the area bounded by Denmark Terrace, Clifton Hill, Powis Road and Victoria Road. The church faces three streets: St. Michael's Place, Powis Road and Victoria Road (on which the main entrance is located).

== History and construction ==
=== Original church ===
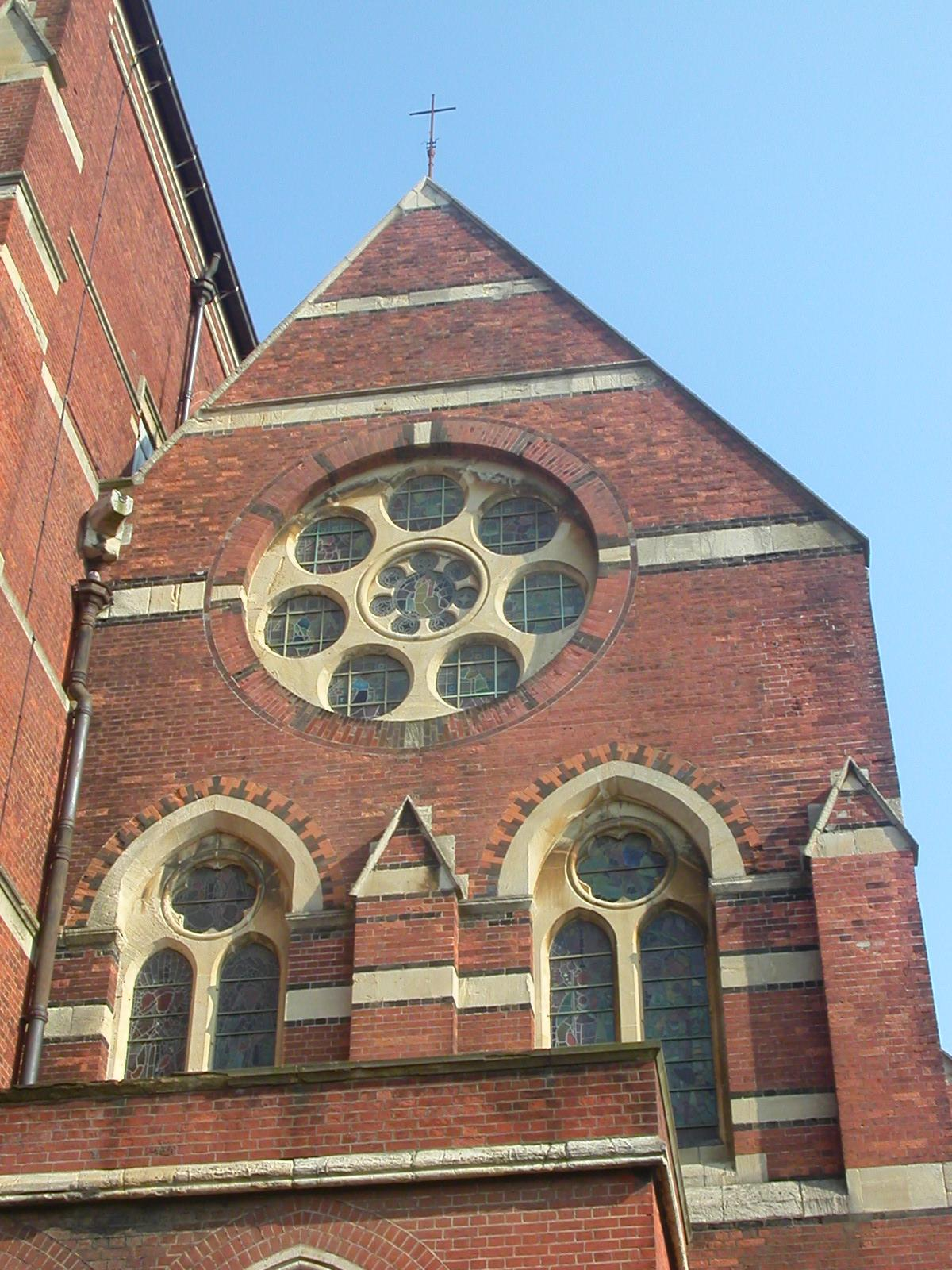
Windows in the west face of the original church (now the south aisle)

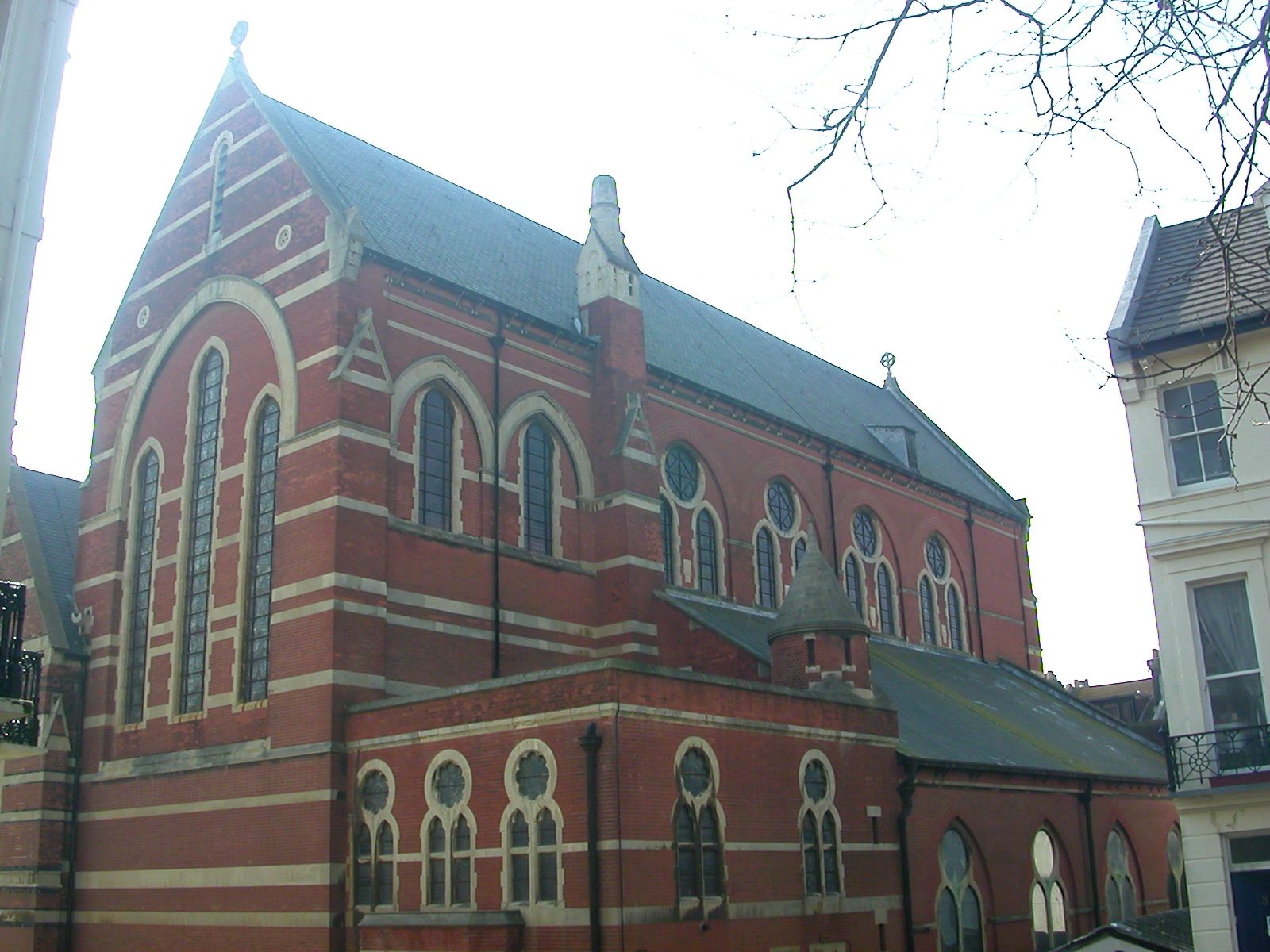
The eastern and northern parts of the church, built in 1893

Plans for the church were drawn up in 1858, and construction took place between 1860 and 1861 to a design by George Frederick Bodley (whose father had been a doctor in Brighton and a resident of the Furze Hill area of Hove, close to the Montpelier and Clifton Hill districts). Bodley was also working on St Paul's Church in West Street, Brighton at the time, on an interior alterations project.

The design of the exterior was reminiscent of the Italianate style, in red brick with horizontal bands of white stone and a steeply pitched slate roof. This featured a modest flèche spire containing a bell recovered from Sevastopol during the Crimean War (1854–1856).

The church took two years to build at a cost of £6,728, and was consecrated by the Bishop of Chichester on 29 September 1862. There was room for a congregation of 700; pew rent was charged on 300 of these seats at first. Rev. Charles Beanlands, who had been a curate at St Paul's Church since his ordination in 1849, was given the perpetual curacy of St Michael's Church, and he remained in this position until his death in 1898.

=== Extension ===
The building quickly became too small and, in 1865, William Burges designed a new church which would incorporate Bodley's building as its two south aisles. The rebuilding was not carried out until 1893, under the direction of Burges's pupil, J.S.Chapple, and took two years. Burges was a contemporary of Bodley; both men were born in 1827. It is not known why a different architect was chosen for the redesign, and the changes reportedly caused Bodley some upset. Burges did not live to see his designs realised: he died in 1881.

The exterior decoration of the new building broadly matched that of the original church, consisting of bands of white stone contrasting with dark red brick, but there is a considerable difference in height. The original building's north aisle was demolished, and its remaining structure became the south aisle of the new church. In terms of the church's present arrangement, therefore, the main body and the adjacent north aisle date from 1893, while the south aisle is original.

The designs, as originally submitted, showed that a cloister and a campanile were planned to be built as well. Inside, additional decoration was to have been made in the chancel, and various additions were proposed for the sanctuary area. A predella (altar platform) behind the altar, a set of sedilia within the sanctuary area and a baldacchino above the altar were all shown in the plans. However, none of these proposals were implemented, and no changes took place in this area until around 1900, when architect and interior designer W. H. Romaine-Walker (1854–1940) provided a marble wall with Cosmatesque-style decoration between the chancel and the nave, a screen for the chancel itself, a new marble altar (in his wife's memory) and extra marble ornamentation for the sanctuary. A rood screen and new reredos were also installed at this time.

A parish hall was built in 1970 on the site, to the north of the church, where the cloister was originally proposed.

== Architecture and fixtures ==
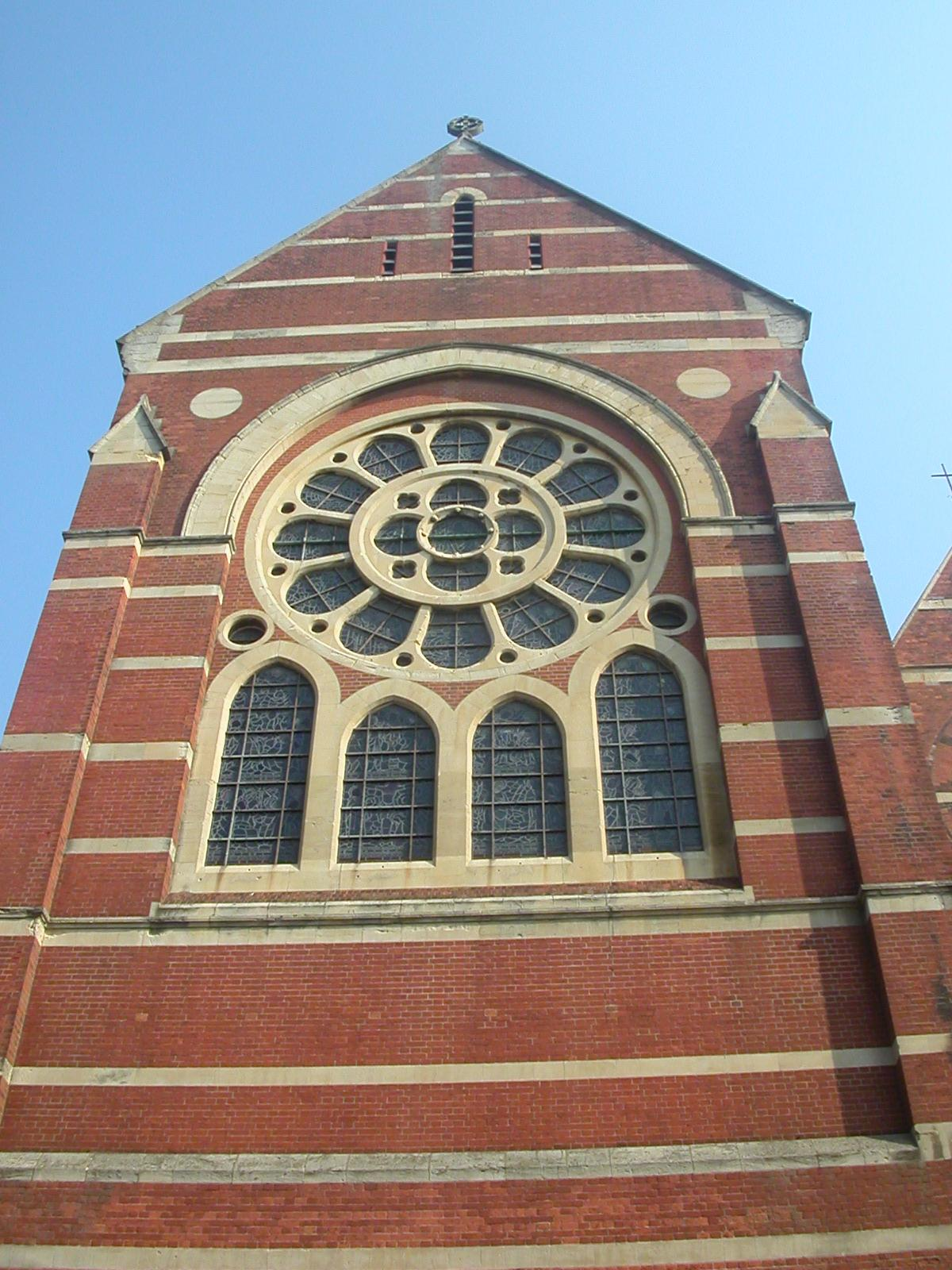
The west windows

Burges's enlargement substantially altered the character of the building, abandoning Bodley's polychrome brickwork interior for proper stone dressings, but he retained the polychrome style for the somewhat brutal exterior.

The interior featured a series of clerestory windows facing south, a stone arch in the chancel and a row of stone columns with foliated decoration (carved with leaf ornamentations). The Pre-Raphaelite Brotherhood, a group of people active in various areas of the arts who were influenced by the Quattrocento period of Italian art, were closely involved with the decoration of the interior. Bodley was informally associated with this recently formed group, in particular with Edward Burne-Jones and William Morris, a long-term friend of his. William Morris himself, along with Philip Webb and Charles Faulkner, was responsible for the painting of the chancel roof. The large windows on the western face of the church were made and installed by Morris, Marshall, Faulkner & Co., the predecessor of Morris's firm Morris & Co.

There are also many stained-glass windows by Morris in the old building and Burne-Jones in the new. The east end of Burges' building features a large trio of stepped lancets with basic two-light tracery. As a whole, the architectural writers Nicholas Antram and Richard Morrice consider that; "no church in Sussex has better Victorian glass."

Internal fixtures include a grey marble font and a green serpentine and calcite (verde antique) pulpit, both designed and made by Bodley. The noted stained glass designer Charles Eamer Kempe was responsible for the restoration and installation of a 15th-century reredos of Flemish origin. This depicts three scenes from Christ's life in the form of a triptych.

== The church today ==
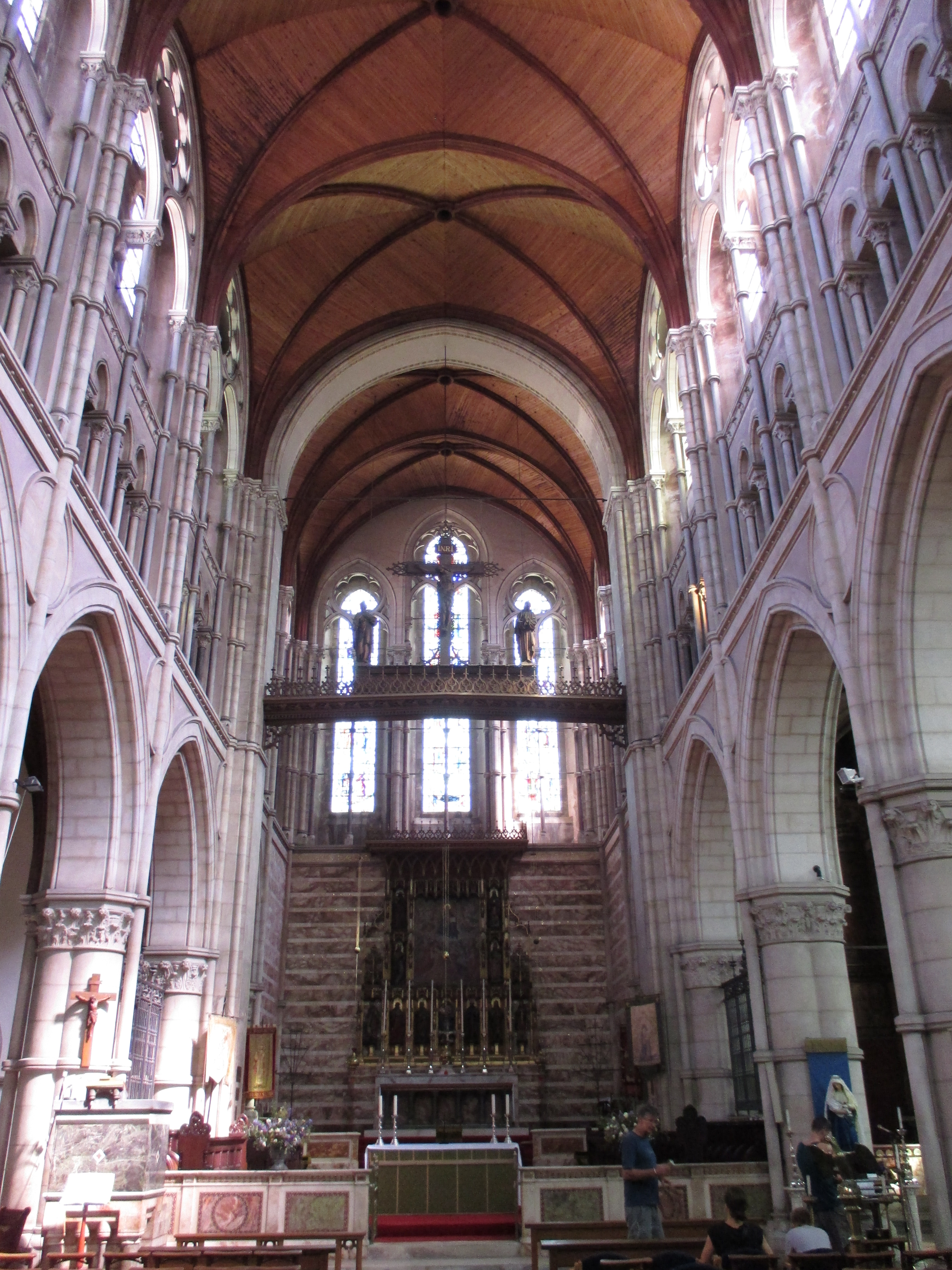
The nave and sanctuary

The area covered by St Michael's—a portion of the western end of St Nicholas' parish—was made a parish in its own right in the early 20th century. St Michael's had previously been a mere chapel of ease. Following the closure and deconsecration of St Stephens Church in Montpelier Place and another local church, All Saints Church in Compton Avenue, Seven Dials, their parishes were absorbed into that of St Michael's; it now covers an area bounded (approximately) by Brighton railway station, Montefiore Road, Upper North Street and the streets between the church and Dyke Road.

Services have always been in the ritualist tradition, reflecting Anglo-Catholic and "High Church" views and doctrine. This caused some controversy in the church's early years, although to a lesser extent than was experienced at St. Bartholomew's and St. Paul's Churches.

Services consist of a daily Mass at various times, and a Sunday morning Sung Mass at 10.30am. A priest is available for Confession after Saturday Masses. In the parish hall, there are Saturday breakfast meetings, a parent and toddler group, dance groups, choir practices and various other activities.

== See also ==
- Grade I listed buildings in Brighton and Hove
- List of places of worship in Brighton and Hove

== Bibliography ==
- Nairn, I and Pevsner, N, The Buildings of England: Sussex, Penguin Books, 1965
- Dale, Antony (1989). Brighton Churches. London: Routledge. ISBN 0-415-00863-8.
- Jenkins, Simon (1999). England's Thousand Best Churches. London: Penguin Books. ISBN 0-7139-9281-6.
- Antram, Nicholas; Morrice, Richard (2008). Brighton and Hove. Yale University Press. ISBN 978-0300126617.
