= Boodle's =

Gentlemen's club in London, England

Coordinates: 51°30′25″N 0°8′22″W

- Founded: 1762; 264 years ago
- Founder: William Petty, 2nd Earl of Shelburne
- Type: Gentlemen's club
- Headquarters: 28 St James's Street
- Location: London, England
- Website: www.boodles.org

Boodle's is a gentlemen's club in London, England, with its clubhouse located at 28 St James's Street. Founded in January 1762 by Lord Shelburne, who later became Prime Minister of the United Kingdom and then 1st Marquess of Lansdowne, it is the second oldest private members' club in London and in the world.

== History ==
The club was originally based next door to William Almack's tavern (which was situated at 49 Pall Mall in the St James's district of London), in a house also run by him; the club therefore was known as Almack's. It appears to have been formed in opposition to White's (then often called Arthur's) – rule 12 as originally drafted forbade any member of Almack's from membership of any other London club, 'nor of what is at present called Arthur's or by whatever Name that Society or Club may be afterwards called, neither of new or old club or any other belonging to it'. In February 1763 this rule was altered and made even more emphatic – 'If any Member of this Society becomes a Member of Arthur's or a Candidate for Arthur's, he is of Course struck out of this Society.' The record book of the new society was kept by Almack as a statement of the terms on which he agreed to provide for the social needs of the members, and it has survived amongst the records of Boodle's.

The first entry, dated 1 January 1762, states that 'William Almack has taken the large new House West of his now dwelling House in Pall Mall for the sole use of a Society Established upon the following Rules.' Until 10 February 1762 membership was to be open to anyone signing his name in the book; thereafter election was to be by ballot, which was always to be held 'in Parliament Time' and one black ball excluded; the total membership was to be limited to 250. After 10 February the members were to appoint thirteen managers, 'each of whom are to have a power to keep order and make the Rules of the Society to be observed'; they were to serve for one year and then each manager was 'to appoint a Successor for the ensuing Year'. The rules of the society could be changed only by the unanimous vote of at least thirty members.

Eighty-eight gentlemen, none of whom appears to have been a member of White's, paid subscriptions for 1762, and the appointment of thirteen managers for the period February 1763 to February 1764 is recorded.

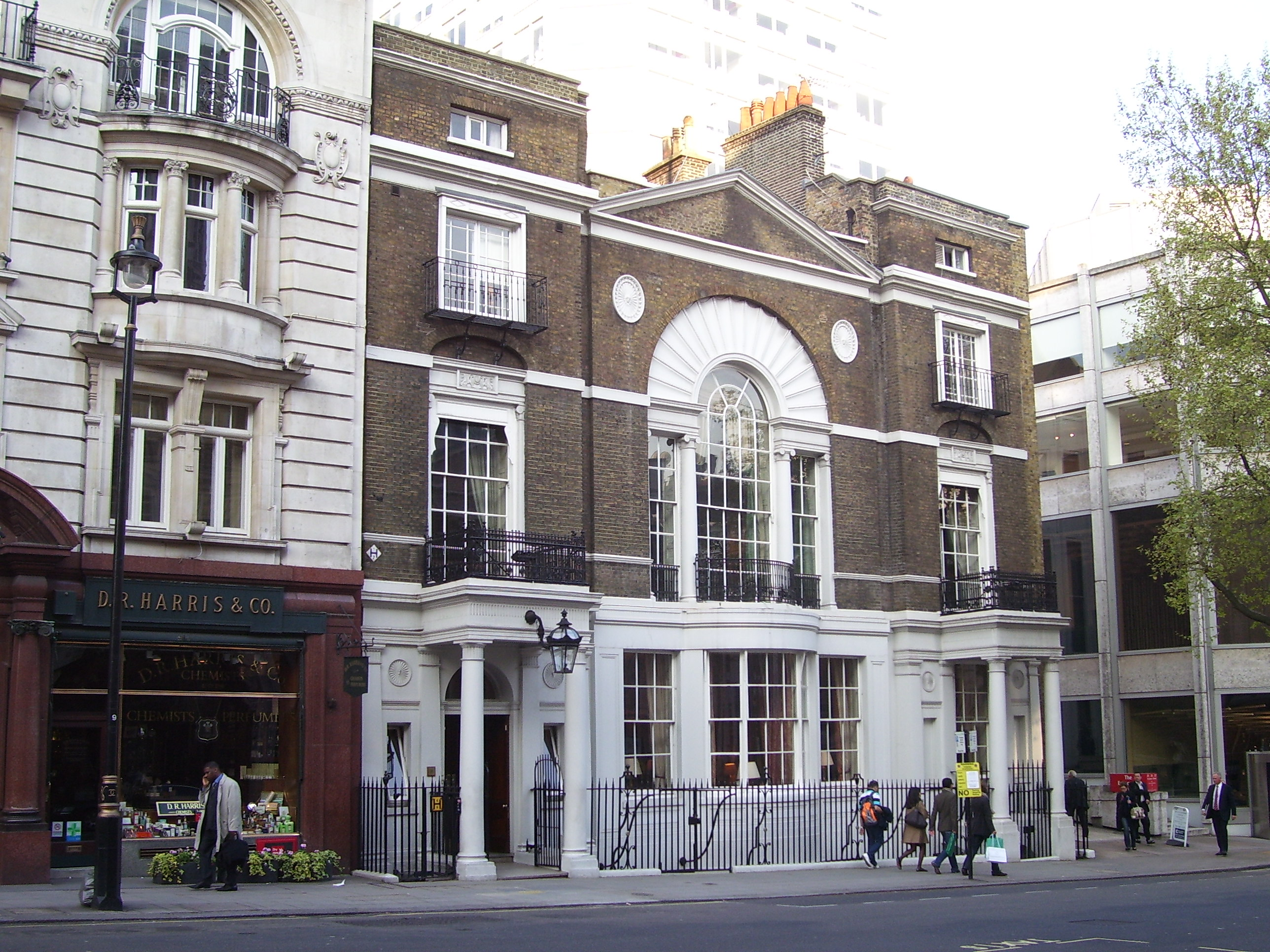
The clubhouse at 28 St James's Street

In March 1764 this club appears to have been superseded by or to have divided itself into two separate societies. The reason for this rearrangement is not known, but it may have been connected with members' differing political affiliations, or with the desire of some of them to gamble more heavily than the rules of 1762 permitted. One of the two successor societies moved to No. 49, Almack's tavern, which was converted into a clubhouse; this club would go on to become Brooks's. The other successor society remained at No. 50: this was the club that would become Boodle's. Edward Boodle is known to have been in partnership with William Almack, probably between 1764 and 1768. The present Boodle's Club in St. James's Street possesses two manuscript books, each containing a list of rules and names of subscribers, each virtually identical to each other, indicating Boodle to have taken over management of this society from 1764. The rules in Boodle's books are based on those contained in Almack's book dated 1 January 1762, and many of them are copied verbatim. This similarity makes it clear that Boodle's club was either a continuation or an off-shoot under new management and slightly altered rules of the club which Almack had established in January 1762. It met in the house which the latter had occupied from January 1762 to February 1764, i.e., No. 50 Pall Mall, next door to the house (No. 49) which from 1759 to 1764 was Almack's tavern and from 1764 to 1778 housed Almack's club, before its removal under William Brooks to St. James's Street.

The partnership between Almack and Boodle probably came to an end in 1768, for in that year Boodle succeeded Almack as the ratepayer for No. 50, and in March 1768 Boodle is known to have held a sub-lease of the house from Almack. Contemporary references to the club become much more frequent. Edward Gibbon first mentions Boodle's in a letter of 18 April 1768, and he subsequently became a member of the club; starting in December 1769 he wrote much of his correspondence there, and in 1770 he was one of the managers.

Boodle died on 8 February 1772, and on 13 February it was unanimously resolved that 'Ben Harding shall succeed the late Mr. Boodle in the House and Business, and shall be supported therein'. On 22 February the residue of Edward Boodle's lease from Almack was reassigned to Harding. In spite of the change of proprietor the club continued to be known as Boodle's. It left No. 50 in 1783, following which the house was occupied by Messrs. Hammersley and Co. for a number of years, and was subsequently demolished.

Boodle's is regarded as one of the most prestigious clubs in London, and counts many British aristocrats and notable politicians among its members. It is the second oldest club in the world, with only White's being older. Boodle's Orange Fool is a traditional club dish.

Early members were opponents of William Pitt the Elder's foreign policies relating to the Seven Years' War, and political allies of Lord Shelburne. The club is generally regarded as being aligned with the Conservative Party, with many of its current and former members holding important positions within the party, although the club is not formally tied to any political party. During the Regency era, Boodle's became known as the club of the English gentry, while White's became the club of the nobility. Four members have been awarded the Victoria Cross and Sir Winston Churchill was one of the few people to be elected to honorary membership. It is reputed that Beau Brummell's last bet took place at the Club before he fled the country to France. Today, membership is solely by nomination and election.

In 1782 Boodle's took over the 'Savoir Vivre' clubhouse at 28 St James's Street, London, and has been located there ever since. The building had been designed by John Crunden in 1775. The ground floor was refurbished by John Buonarotti Papworth between 1821 and 1834.

== Notable members ==
- Sir John Blofeld (1932-2025)
- Henry Blofeld, OBE (born 1939)
- Claud Thomas Bourchier, VC (1831–1877)
- "Beau" Brummell (1778–1840)
- John Worthy Chaplin, VC, CB (1840–1920)
- Winston Churchill (1874–1965)
- William Cavendish, 5th Duke of Devonshire, KG (1748–1811)
- Wilfred "Biffy" Dunderdale (1899–1990)
- Julian Fellowes (born 1949)
- Ian Fleming (1908–1964)
- Charles James Fox (1749–1806)
- Edward Gibbon (1737–1794)
- Andrew Hargreaves (born 1955)
- John Henniker-Major, 8th Baron Henniker (1916–2004)
- David Hume (1711–1776)
- Peter Inge, Baron Inge (1935–2022)
- Charles Lyell, 2nd Baron Lyell, VC (1913–1943)
- Sir William Miles, 1st Baronet (1797–1878)
- Sir William Roger Clotworthy Moore, TD, 3rd Baronet (born 1927)
- David Niven (1910–1983)
- John Profumo (1915–2006)
- Richard Spring, Baron Risby (born 1946)
- William Petty, 2nd Earl of Shelburne (1737–1805)
- Adam Smith (1723–1790)
- Michael Angelo Taylor (1757–1834)
- Frederic Morgan, 5th Baron Tredegar (1873–1954)
- Arthur Wellesley, 1st Duke of Wellington (1769–1852)
- John Fane, 10th Earl of Westmorland (1759–1841)
- William Wilberforce (1759–1833)

== See also ==
- List of London's gentlemen's clubs
