= St Stephen's Church, Brighton =

Church in East Sussex, England

St Stephen's Church
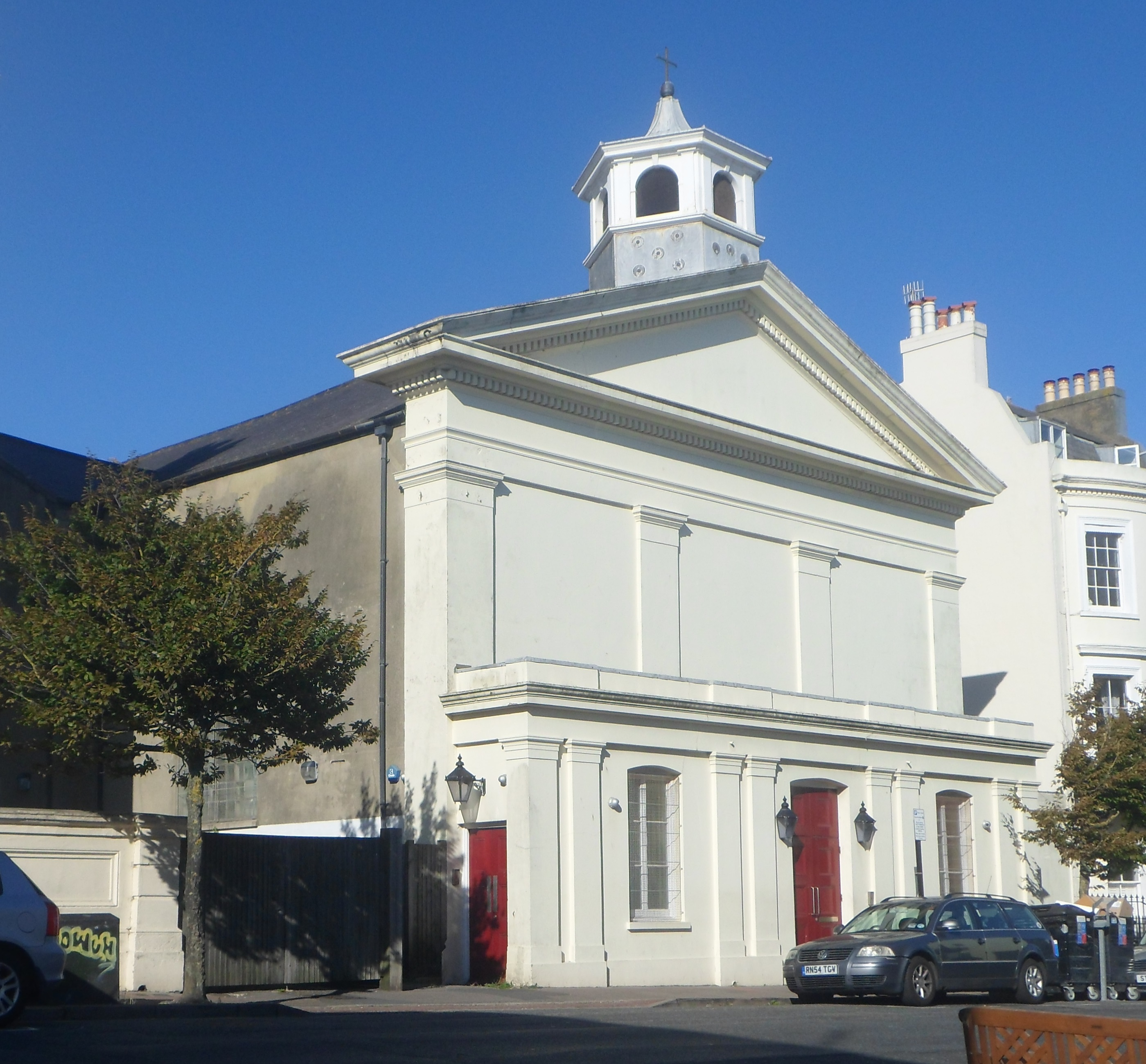
- The building from the southwest
- St Stephen's Church
- 50.8266°N 0.1531°W
- Location: Montpelier Place, Montpelier, Brighton and Hove BN1 3BF
- Country: England
- Denomination: Anglican

History
- Former name(s): Royal Pavilion Chapel; Diocesan Institute for the Deaf and Dumb
- Status: Church
- Founded: 1822 (as private chapel); 1851 (as St Stephen's Church)
- Dedication: Saint Stephen
- Dedicated: 25 July 1851
- Consecrated: 11 June 1852

Architecture
- Functional status: Day centre for homeless people
- Heritage designation: Grade II* listed
- Designated: 31 October 1952
- Architect(s): John Crunden; remodelled by Arthur Blomfield
- Style: Classical
- Closed: 1939 (as St Stephen's Church); 1974 (as Diocesan Institute for the Deaf and Dumb)

St Stephen's Church is a former Anglican church in the Montpelier area of Brighton, part of the English city of Brighton and Hove. The building, which dates from 1766 in its original incarnation as the ballroom of Brighton's most fashionable Georgian-era inn, has been used for many purposes since then, and now stands 1 mile (1.6 km) away from where it was built. It spent less than 90 years as an Anglican church, and is now used as a centre for homeless people. In view of its architectural and historical importance, it has been listed at Grade II* by English Heritage.

== History ==
Brighton began to develop as a spa town and seaside resort in the mid-18th century, encouraged by local doctor Richard Russell's influential advocacy of the therapeutic use of seawater, by drinking it and bathing in it. These activities became fashionable among high society and rich people, which gave the declining fishing village a surge of popularity in the 1750s.

The Steine (now Old Steine), an area of flat, grassy, sheltered land behind the seafront, developed as the growing town's promenade, where visitors would walk and socialise. The surrounding area soon became built up, and in 1752 innkeeper Samuel Shergold bought a recently built house on the southwest side of The Steine and converted it into a tavern with assembly rooms. The venue, called the Castle Inn or Castle Tavern, became increasingly popular, and in 1766 John Crunden designed an extension on the north side of the inn. This extension housed a 450-capacity, 80 by 40 feet (24 m × 12 m) ballroom. For the next half-century it was one of the most popular social venues in the town, rivalled only by the Old Ship Inn and assembly rooms (whose owner cooperated with Shergold to provide a regular programme of alternating social events). Contemporary accounts described the Castle Inn's ballroom and assembly rooms as some of the best and most architecturally impressive in England.

Decline set in during the early 19th century, and the assembly room's first summer-season closure occurred in 1815. Crunden's ballroom was closed the previous year. In 1815, Shergold offered a 25% share in the building and its land, and the Prince Regent (later King George IV) bought it through an intermediary, Thomas Attree, for £1,960 (£150,900 in 2025). He acquired another 25% share in 1816 and the remaining 50% in 1822, and the inn closed to the public soon afterwards and was demolished in stages between 1819 and October 1823.

The ballroom was converted into the recently completed Royal Pavilion's private chapel for the Prince Regent—who by this time was King—and was consecrated on 1 January 1822 by the Bishop of Chichester. The King had moved into the Pavilion the previous year. In its new guise, the chapel had over 400 seats and admission was by invitation only. Designer William Tuppen was responsible for the interior refit, which included the conversion of the musicians' gallery into the King's own pew and the installation of an organ supported by Gothic-style columns.

The Royal Pavilion was unpopular with Queen Victoria, whose reign began in 1837. Her last visit was in 1845; soon afterwards the Government wanted to demolish the building and sell the land to pay for building work at Buckingham Palace. This proposal was unpopular in the town, and in May 1850 the Town Commissioners received consent to buy the 9-acre (3.6 ha) site, including the chapel. It became the property of Brighton Corporation (the forerunners of the present-day Council) in 1855.

Because the chapel had been consecrated for Anglican worship, the Church Commissioners claimed it on behalf of the Diocese of Chichester. Instead of leaving the building on the same site, the Diocese decided to demolish it and re-erect it brick by brick on a site 1 mile (1.6 km) away, at Montpelier Place near the boundary with Hove. Because the Diocese's claim on the church was upheld, the Town Commissioners reduced their payment to the Government for the Pavilion estate by £3,000 (£349,200 in 2025). The land at Montpelier Place was transferred free of charge to the Diocese by the Vicar of Brighton's sister. The interior of the chapel was only minimally altered by the move and reconstruction, which was completed in 1851. It was given a new stuccoed façade in the Classical style, however.

The church was opened for public worship under its new name, St Stephen's, on 25 July 1851, and was consecrated on 11 June 1852 by the Bishop of Chichester, Ashurst Turner Gilbert. The Vicar of Brighton's nephew George Wagner became its first vicar; he was an adherent of the mid-19th century idea that Gothic architecture was the only appropriate design for Anglican churches, and regarded the Classical building as "pre-eminently ugly". The church could hold more than 700 worshippers, and approximately one-quarter of the pews were free (not subject to pew rents). It attracted a mostly poor congregation.

Some internal changes were made over the next 90 years, but Rev. Charles Douglas's plans for a new Byzantine-style church on the site, announced in the 1860s, were not realised. A porch and vestry were built in 1868, and new lectern, altar rails, organ and pulpits were put in. Arthur Blomfield carried out further renovation work in 1889. In the 1930s the church became associated with The Anglican Diocese of Chichester's Healing Ministry, under the leadership of the Revd. John Maillard, and it was closed in 1939 and converted into the Diocese of Chichester's Institute for the Deaf and Dumb. In 1974, this moved to a building next to the former St John the Evangelist's Church on Carlton Hill. In 1988, a local housing association acquired the building and converted it into the First Base Day Centre for homeless people. Crunden's interior, which had survived largely intact since he built the ballroom in 1766, was damaged by fire soon after the day centre opened, but it has been restored.

== Architecture ==
John Crunden designed the Castle Inn ballroom in the Adam style, which is still discernible in the interior despite the many changes of use the building has experienced. The internal walls had elaborate pilasters decorated with scrolls and friezes, and at the north and south ends there were recessed areas separated from the main section by columns. Between the pilasters were a series of wall paintings. When the building was re-erected at Montpelier Place, galleries were added above the north and south recesses. In contrast to the Adamesque interior, the church was given a plain stuccoed Classical frontage facing Montpelier Place, with Doric pilasters below a pediment and cornice, topped by a lantern. The east and west faces have arched windows. Local architect George Cheeseman was responsible for this work. The porch, a later addition, has three bays with arched windows in the outer pair and the entrance door in the centre.

== The building today ==
St Stephen's Church was listed at Grade II* by English Heritage on 13 October 1952. This status is given to "particularly important buildings of more than special interest". As of February 2001, it was one of 70 Grade II*-listed buildings and structures, and 1,218 listed buildings of all grades, in the city of Brighton and Hove.

The First Base Day Centre, as the building is now known, is run by Brighton Housing Trust. It was established in the 1960s and now has several sites in the city. About 100 people use the centre daily. Since the trust acquired the building, it has made several internal alterations.

== See also ==
- Grade II* listed buildings in Brighton and Hove
- List of places of worship in Brighton and Hove

== Sources ==
- Berry, Sue (2005), Georgian Brighton, Chichester: Phillimore & Co. Ltd, ISBN 1-86077-342-7
- Carder, Timothy (1990), The Encyclopaedia of Brighton, Lewes: East Sussex County Libraries, ISBN 0-86147-315-9
- Dale, Antony (1950), The History and Architecture of Brighton, Brighton: Bredin & Heginbothom Ltd
- Dale, Antony (1989), Brighton Churches, London: Routledge, ISBN 0-415-00863-8
- Elleray, D. Robert (1981), The Victorian Churches of Sussex, Chichester: Phillimore & Co, ISBN 0-85033-378-4
- Gilbert, Edmund M. (1954), Brighton: Old Ocean's Bauble, Hassocks: Flare Books, ISBN 0-901759-39-2
- Gray, Fred (2006), Designing the Seaside: Architecture, Society and Nature, London: Reaktion Books, ISBN 1-86189-274-8
- Musgrave, Clifford (1981), Life in Brighton, Rochester: Rochester Press, ISBN 0-571-09285-3
- Nairn, Ian; Pevsner, Nikolaus (1965), The Buildings of England: Sussex, Harmondsworth: Penguin Books, ISBN 0-14-071028-0
- Russell, Richard (1755), The Oeconomy of Nature in Acute and Chronical Diseases of the Glands (8th ed.), John and James Rivington, London; and James Fletcher, Oxford Full text at Internet Archive (archive.org).
- Russell, Richard (1760), "A Dissertation on the Use of Sea Water in the Diseases of the Glands. Particularly The Scurvy, Jaundice, King's-Evil, Leprosy, and the Glandular Consumption", To which is added a Translation of Dr. Speed's Commentary on SEA WATER. As also An Account of the Nature, Properties, and Uses of all the remarkable Mineral Waters in Great Britain (4th ed.), London: W. Owen First published 1750 as De Tabe Glandulari. Full text at Google Books.
- School of Architecture and Interior Design, Brighton Polytechnic (1987), A Guide to the Buildings of Brighton, Macclesfield: McMillan Martin, ISBN 1-869865-03-0
