= John Crunden =

English architect of country houses and villas and mobiliary designer

John Crunden (c. 1741 – 1828) was an English architect of country houses and villas, and mobiliary designer.

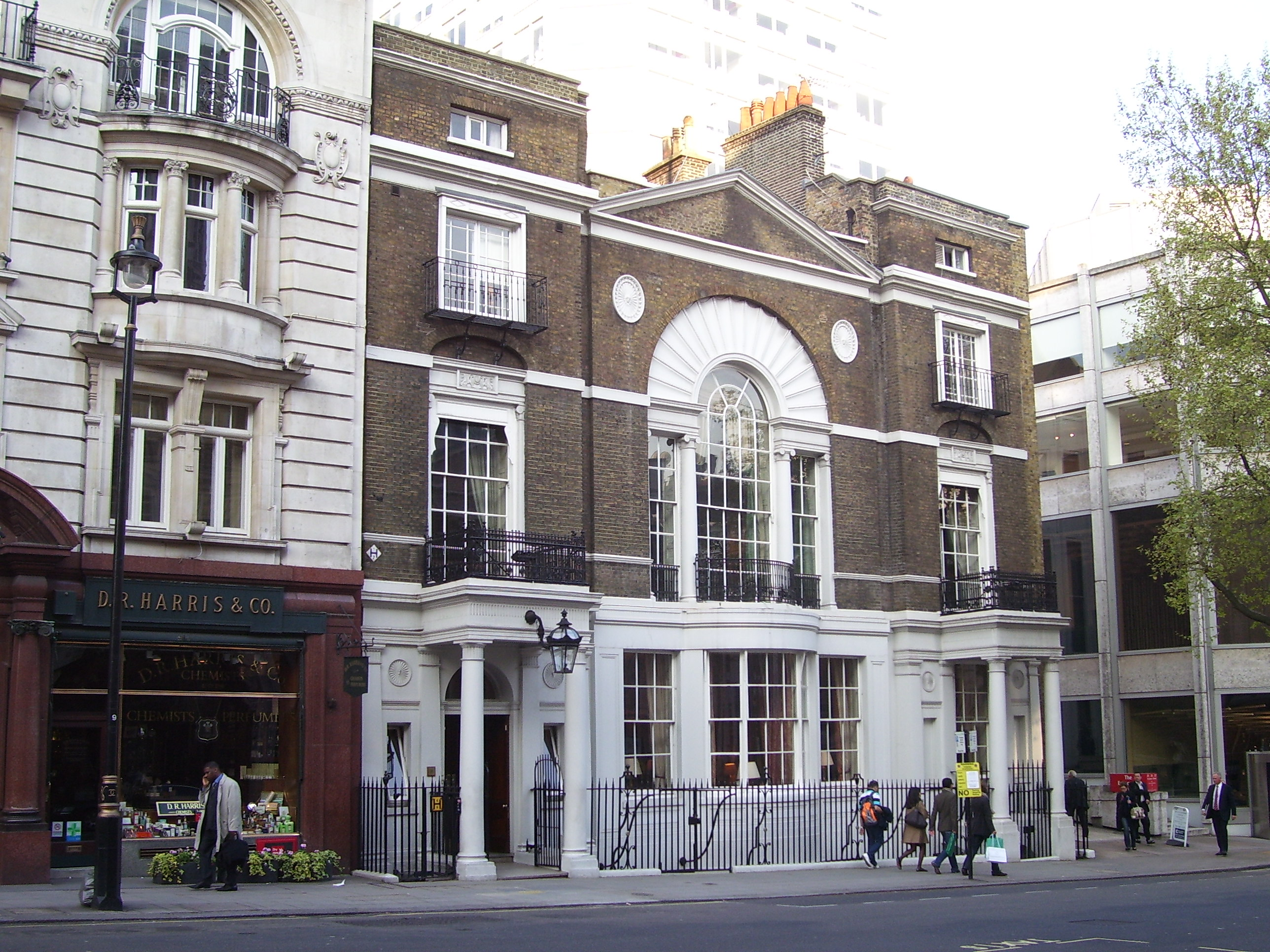
Boodle's Club, designed by John Crunden in 1776

== Biography ==
Most of his early inspiration was drawn from Chippendale and his school. He produced a very large number of designs which were published in numerous volumes; among the most ambitious were ornamental centres for ceilings in which he introduced cupids with bows and arrows, Fame sounding her trumpet, and such like motives. Sport and natural history supplied him with many other themes, and one of his ceilings is a hunting scene representing a kill.

== Works ==
His principal works were Designs for Ceilings; Convenient and Ornamental Architecture (1767, last revised 1797, reprinted 1805); The Carpenter's Companion for Chinese Railings, Gates, etc. (1770); The Joiner and Cabinet-maker's Darling, or Sixty Designs for Gothic, Chinese, Mosaic and Ornamental Frets (1765); the design of Boodle's Club, St James's Street, London (1775–76); and The Chimney Piece Maker's Daily Assistant (1776).
