= Grade II listed buildings in Brighton and Hove: A–B =

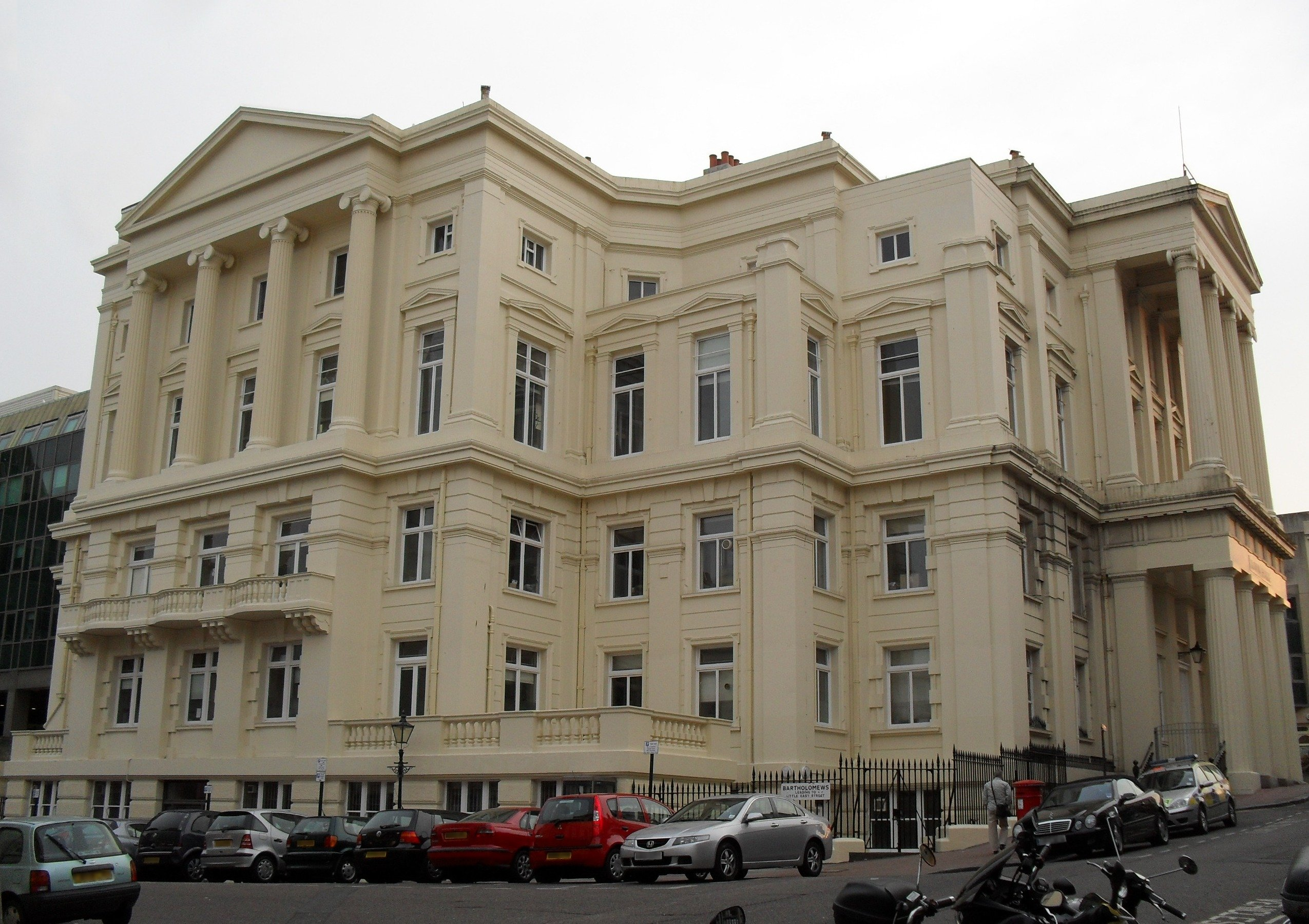
Brighton's Classical-style town hall, built in 1830–1832 in a near-cruciform shape (the south-facing arm was omitted), was extended later in the 19th century.

As of February 2001, there were 1,124 listed buildings with Grade II status in the English city of Brighton and Hove. The total at 2009 was similar. The city, on the English Channel coast approximately 52 miles (84 km) south of London, was formed as a unitary authority in 1997 by the merger of the neighbouring towns of Brighton and Hove. Queen Elizabeth II granted city status in 2000.

In England, a building or structure is defined as "listed" when it is placed on a statutory register of buildings of "special architectural or historic interest" by the Secretary of State for Culture, Media and Sport, a Government department, in accordance with the Planning (Listed Buildings and Conservation Areas) Act 1990. English Heritage, a non-departmental public body, acts as an agency of this department to administer the process and advise the department on relevant issues. There are three grades of listing status. The Grade II designation is the lowest, and is used for "nationally important buildings of special interest". Grade II* is used for "particularly important buildings of more than special interest"; there are 69 such buildings in the city. There are also 24 Grade I listed buildings (defined as being of "exceptional interest" and greater than national importance, and the highest of the three grades) in Brighton and Hove. One listed building, the former Astoria Theatre, was demolished in 2018.

This list summarises 124 Grade II-listed buildings and structures whose names begin with A or B. Numbered buildings with no individual name are listed by the name of the street they stand on. Some listings include contributory fixtures such as surrounding walls or railings in front of the building. These are summarised by notes alongside the building name.

== Listed buildings ==
Contributory fixtures
Note	Listing includes
^{[A]}	Attached railings
^{[B]}	Attached walls
^{[C]}	Attached walls and piers
^{[D]}	Attached walls and railings
^{[E]}	Attached walls, gates and railings
^{[F]}	Attached walls, piers and railings
^{[G]}	Attached walls, piers, railings and lamps

Listed buildings
Building name	Area	Image	Notes	Refs
Abbey Hotel	Montpelier; 50.8272°N 0.1539°W		Norfolk Terrace was developed piecemeal in the 1850s. A terrace of six five-storey houses, stuccoed, bay-fronted and with moulded architraves and pediments, were converted into a hotel and show consequent alterations. The hotel has subsequently been turned into bedsits. A cornice with dentil decoration runs across the building below the roof.	
17 and 19 Abbey Road^{[D]}	Kemptown; 50.8192°N 0.1197°W		These stucco-faced, slate-roofed terraced houses also face Great College Street, and present a three-window façade to it. Built in the Italianate style, and once lived in by former mayor Henry Abbey, the mid-19th-century houses have porches with piers, pilasters and bracketed cornices with rusticated decoration.	
Adelaide Mansions	Hove; 50.8244°N 0.1658°W		This four-house terrace dates from 1873. The roofline, hiding attic space, has a parapet with balustrades, and the whole four-storey building is faced with stucco with brick underneath. The windows vary between segment-headed and pediment-topped, and between the casement and sash styles. The porches have Doric columns.	
2 and 4 Albany Villas^{[D]}	Hove; 50.8255°N 0.1734°W		The main point of interest in these 1850s semi-detached villas is the semicircle-headed dormers in the attic. Prominent quoins show the divide between the houses; the façade is entirely stuccoed. The hipped roof has large bracketed eaves.	
3 and 5 Albany Villas	Hove; 50.8254°N 0.1729°W		With their stucco-faced brickwork, wide quoins, sash windows, side porches with pilasters and steps, deep eaves and slate roof, these villas are similar to the contemporary pair and 2 and 4 Albany Villas opposite.	
Albemarle Mansions^{[C]}	Hove; 50.8249°N 0.1751°W		These three-storey flats on Kingsway, facing away from the sea, date from about 1870. A dentil cornice is topped by a parapet which obscures the roof; like the rest of the three-storey building, these features are stuccoed. The L-shaped plan consists of a five-bay northern façade and seven bays to the east.	
All Saints Church: Vicarage	Hove; 50.8302°N 0.1663°W		John Loughborough Pearson, who designed the Grade I-listed church, added a vicarage in a different style in 1882–83. The Tudor–Gothic brick and Bath stone building has oriel and trefoil-headed mullioned and transomed windows.	
2, 3, 4, 8, 8a and 9 Arundel Place Mews	Kemp Town; 50.8163°N 0.1089°W		These formed the service areas for the east side of Lewes Crescent and Sussex Square in the Kemp Town development, and were built slightly later (between 1840 and 1860). The L-shaped mews present a three- and a four-window façade to a courtyard, with narrow doorways with high, arched fanlights. The hipped roof has large eaves and chimneys.	
11 and 12 Arundel Place Mews^{[C]}	Kemp Town; 50.8160°N 0.1089°W		The architecture of this long two-storey stuccoed part of the mews, contemporary with the separately listed section nearby, has been called "Tuscan Vernacular Revival". Some original sash windows survive, and the lower storey resembles an arcade with its series of round-arched doors and openings.	
Astoria Theatre (demolished)	Brighton; 50.8261°N 0.1362°W		Now a disused bingo hall, this Art Deco-style cinema opened in 1933 as an 1,800-capacity "super-cinema". It is steel-framed with brick walls and a 45-metre (148 ft) stone façade. The interior friezework is considered particularly impressive. The cinema closed in 1977, and bingo ceased in 1997. Demolition work began on the building in April 2018.	
1–5 Atlingworth Street^{[A]}	Kemptown; 50.8195°N 0.1297°W		Number 1 in this terrace is taller and narrower, with one window on each of four full storeys. The others have two- or three-window ranges but only two storeys and an attic floor. Stucco, pilastered entrance porches and parapets give a Classical appearance.	
13–24 Atlingworth Street^{[A]}	Kemptown; 50.8195°N 0.1294°W		The terrace, built in the 1820s, has a long series of bow windows; some original glazing and frames remain. The three- and four-storey houses have Tuscan order porches like their counterparts opposite.	
Aubrey House	Rottingdean; 50.8065°N 0.0593°W		In 1889, Edward Burne-Jones commissioned an architect to refront this ancient house. W.A.S. Benson's work added three buttressed arcaded windows, wooden balconies in front of the roof and a long oriel window. Weatherboarding at the rear may have been added on behalf of Enid Bagnold, a later resident.	
Baldwin Mausoleum at Brighton Extramural Cemetery	Bear Road; 50.8364°N 0.1201°W		Prolific Brighton architect John Leopold Denman designed this marble and stone tomb in a Byzantine Revival style for Edmund Baldwin. The cruciform structure has a dome and a columned entrance with a bronze door.	
Banjo Groyne	Kemp Town; 50.8162°N 0.1201°W		Doubling as a groyne and a walkway for Victorian promenaders, this flint feature opposite Paston Place was built in the 1880s, when many improvements were made to the fixtures along Marine Parade. There have been later alterations.	
Barford Court	Hove; 50.8264°N 0.1827°W		This was originally a private house; later uses were a school of nursing and a care home. Architect Robert Cromie, known mostly for cinemas, designed it in 1934–37 for iron-industry tycoon and film director Ian Stuart Millar. The severe, plain Neo-Georgian exterior, in Italian purple-grey brick, contrasts with the opulent Art Deco interior.	
Barn at Hillside	Rottingdean; 50.8069°N 0.0600°W		Hillside, a Grade II*-listed 18th-century house, has a contemporary barn to its southwest. The walls are of knapped flint, mostly laid in courses. The large entrance is weatherboarded.	
Barn at Stanmer Park	Stanmer; 50.8710°N 0.1020°W		Built in the mid-18th century in the estate village of Stanmer, this "long barn" of 12 bays is a traditional Sussex design. Three walls are of flint, but one is weatherboarded on top of timber framing. The hipped roof has braces and queen posts inside.	
1 Bartholomews	The Lanes; 50.8210°N 0.1400°W		This 19th-century three-storey house is now in commercial use. The three-window range consists of large straight-headed sashes with prominent sills. The exterior is stuccoed.	
3 Bartholomews^{[A]}	The Lanes; 50.8210°N 0.1398°W		A good example of Georgian architecture in central Brighton, this early-19th-century red-brick house now has a ground-floor shopfront inserted. On the first floor, a sash window is separated from tall, narrow openings by brick piers. The top floor has one large window and a dentil-patterned cornice above.	
4 Bartholomews	The Lanes; 50.8210°N 0.1397°W		This Georgian-style building, contemporary with its neighbours, has a three-window range and a narrow recessed fourth bay with blank windows to the right. The entrance is in this part, next to a modern shopfront. The red brick and stucco walls are topped by a parapet and a slate roof.	
5 and 6 Bartholomews^{[A]}	The Lanes; 50.8210°N 0.1396°W		Although the buildings no longer look the same, they were built as a pair of red-brick four-storey houses. Number 6 had a fifth storey added in the late 19th century, and is now stuccoed. Number 5 has piano nobile windows on the first floor, with an iron balcony in front. They sit between Tuscan pilasters and an open pediment, as do the first-floor windows of number 6.	
6c Bartholomews	The Lanes; 50.8205°N 0.1395°W		This early-19th-century building presents façades to both East Street and Bartholomews. Both sides have a shopfront on the ground-floor and a single-window range to each of the three floors above. All are sashes of various sizes. The walls are stuccoed.	
7 Bartholomews	The Lanes; 50.8205°N 0.1396°W		This three-storey building, with a shop below two floors of flats, has a single-window range; the sash window on the top floor is smaller than that on the middle storey, but both have architraves and large sills. A cornice and parapet obscure the roof on the street-facing wall only.	
8 Bartholomews	The Lanes; 50.8204°N 0.1395°W		Also known as The Cottage, this tarred and cobbled house (now in commercial use) has 18th-century origins. Coating flints in pitch was a common weatherproofing technique in 18th- and 19th-century Brighton. The side wall is stuccoed and has a chimney. Below the roof is a dentil cornice interrupted by the upper-storey window lintels.	
Bath Arms and 4 and 5 Meeting House Lane	The Lanes; 50.8211°N 0.1411°W		Like most of the surrounding buildings, this was an early-19th-century house. In 1864, it was remodelled to form a tall three-storey pub with living quarters above, which appears "gargantuan" in relation to the narrow lanes (Meeting House Lane and Union Street) it faces. The façades have two- and four-window ranges respectively, and there are three doorways—each flanked by pilasters.	
Beacon Mill	Rottingdean; 50.8059°N 0.0630°W		Used for corn-milling from 1802 until 1881, this smock mill may have been used by smugglers signalling to ships at sea. Renovations in 1905, the 1930s, 1966 and 1975 have restored the landmark, on the 216 feet (66 m) Beacon Hill, to good condition. The base is of stone and brick; an octagonal weatherboarded body rises to three storeys above it. Sir William Nicholson's drawing of the mill was Heinemann's logo for many years.	
2 Bedford Place	Brighton; 50.8239°N 0.1545°W		This is a 3-storey end-of-terrace house of the mid-19th century. Stuccoed, with rusticated walls on the ground floor, it has bay windows and a dormer window above the cornice.	
4–7 Bedford Square^{[A]}	Brighton; 50.8229°N 0.1550°W		Work on Bedford Square started in 1807, making it one of the earliest developments west of the old village centre. These four houses at the southwest corner have three floors, mansard roofs with dormers, bay windows and first-floor verandahs with iron railings.	
8 Bedford Square^{[A]}	Brighton; 50.8231°N 0.1549°W		Building work on the square was mostly carried out in about 1810, but it was not finished until 1828. This house rises to four storeys and has two windows (including bays) with architraves on each floor, plus a dormer. An iron balcony at first-floor level is supported on decorative brackets.	
9 Bedford Square^{[A]}	Brighton; 50.8232°N 0.1549°W		This house has four storeys but, unlike its neighbour at number 8, no dormer window. Except on the ground floor, the single bay windows are slightly left of centre. The verandah and railings at first-floor level have been attributed to Amon Wilds.	
10–13 Bedford Square^{[A]}	Brighton; 50.8233°N 0.1548°W		Bedford Square's houses were originally seasonal lodging houses. This group of four all have three storeys and dormer windows in their mansard roof; a verandah spans the first three, and all four share an iron balcony. Number 13 has a more elaborate entrance and some stuccoed wall panels.	
14 Bedford Square^{[A]}	Brighton; 50.8234°N 0.1547°W		Unlike its neighbours, this house has four storeys, a verandah and steps leading to its entrance. The ground floor is rusticated. There are cornices at both second- and top-floor levels.	
15 and 16 Bedford Square^{[A]}	Brighton; 50.8235°N 0.1547°W		This pair of mansard-roofed three-storey houses with attics and dormer windows show some differences: number 15 is partly rusticated, has a cornice and its original early-19th-century door, and has only one window on each floor. Number 16 lacks a cornice but has an original iron balcony and a two-window range.	
21–25 Bedford Square^{[A]}	Brighton; 50.8235°N 0.1543°W		Each house in this terrace has a single-window range (all original bays except for one modern replacement on number 21) and four storeys topped by a continuous parapet. Only number 25 lacks an arched doorway: instead it has a Classical-style example with Doric columns. Number 21 has a long history of non-residential use: before World War II it was allegedly a brothel, then it became a nightclub before being given a ground-floor shopfront in the 1960s. In 1963 it became Ben Sherman's first shirt factory. Subsequently, it was an office, but in 2015 planning permission was sought to convert it back into a house.	
26 and 27 Bedford Square	Brighton; 50.8234°N 0.1540°W		These form the northeast corner of Bedford Square, and are of different heights and designs: number 26 is taller. Most windows are bays. Number 26 lacks the cast-iron balcony which its neighbour has, but has pilasters around the doorcase.	
28–31 Bedford Square^{[A]}	Brighton; 50.8232°N 0.1541°W		The square is architecturally inconsistent, but Pevsner considered these houses, with their bow windows and paired Doric pilasters, to be the best. A highly decorated frieze has carved bucrania (ox skulls) on its triglyphs. Each house has a balcony with a separate canopy.	
32 and 33 Bedford Square^{[A]}	Brighton; 50.8231°N 0.1542°W		A slate roof with dormers tops this pair of three-storey houses. Steps, whose attached railings are topped with spear shapes, lead to the straight-headed right-sided doorways. Each storey has a single bay window; pilasters flank those on the ground floor.	
34–39 Bedford Square^{[A]}	Brighton; 50.8230°N 0.1542°W		Canted and standard bay windows, arched doorcases of various designs, balconies with verandah-style canopies, pilasters and decorative stuccoed panels characterise the six houses at the southeast corner of the square.	
17 and 18 Bedford Street^{[A]}	Kemptown; 50.8189°N 0.1268°W		These were built in about 1826; number 17, of painted brick and with two windows on each of the four floors, is attributed to Wilds and Busby. Number 18 is stuccoed and has a single-window range. Its entrance is in a pedimented porch.	
1–3 Belgrave Place^{[A]}	Kemptown; 50.8170°N 0.1178°W		Belgrave Place's 17 houses "form an important group" on the seafront. The three houses in the southwest corner have three storeys, rusticated stuccoed ground floors with round-arched windows, and yellow-brick upper floors. An iron balcony runs across the first floor below its straight-headed windows.	
4–7 Belgrave Place^{[A]}	Kemptown; 50.8172°N 0.1177°W		Thomas Cubitt built the square on land given to him by Thomas Read Kemp as payment in kind for Cubitt's work on the Kemp Town estate two decades earlier. These four houses are stuccoed with three storeys, dormers and basements. The ground floors are treated with rusticated decoration. There is a split cast-iron balcony and Ionic columns.	
8–10 Belgrave Place^{[A]}	Kemptown; 50.8173°N 0.1175°W		The four-storey, seven-bay centrepiece of Cubitt's development faces the sea and has the date 1846 and belgrave place engraved on the entablature of the full-width pediment above the parapet, which is set forward slightly. They are considered the best part of the development: the east and west sides are "uncomfortably" tall in relation to the width of the street.	
11 and 12 Belgrave Place^{[A]}	Kemptown; 50.8172°N 0.1173°W		This pair of three-storey houses have canted bay windows with sashes, four storeys (the highest of which forms an attic storey) topped by a cornice, straight-headed entrances with steps and fanlights, and a single cast-iron balcony.	
13–17 Belgrave Place^{[A]}	Kemptown; 50.8169°N 0.1174°W		Like numbers 1–3 opposite, these have three storeys. All have dormer windows as well, and number 17 has an attic storey. Each house has a flat-headed two-window range; those on the first floor are set below architraves, topped by an open pediment on number 13.	
2 Belmont^{[C]}	Seven Dials; 50.8325°N 0.1482°W		This short street of 1850s detached villas was built on the site of Lashmar's Mill, built in 1821 and moved to Clayton in 1852 where it still stands as Jill Mill. Number 2 dates from about 1858 and rises to three storeys. The walls are mostly knapped flint with some stucco.	
3 Belmont	Seven Dials; 50.8327°N 0.1480°W		This detached villa has two storeys, but is otherwise similar to number 2 Belmont with its flint walls and stuccoed quoins. The four-bay façade has sash windows, and the leftmost bay is slightly recessed.	
4 Belmont	Seven Dials; 50.8327°N 0.1485°W		Built at the same time as its neighbours, this three-storey villa has the same flint and stuccoed exterior and a tiled hipped roof. The entrance porch is topped with an archivolt supported on pilasters.	
5 and 6 Belmont^{[B]}	Seven Dials; 50.8326°N 0.1487°W		These semi-detached houses are of the same style and date as their detached neighbours. Number 6 also presents a two-window façade to Dyke Road; this is entirely stuccoed, with no flint. All windows at ground-floor level are bays.	
Benfield Barn	Hangleton; 50.8499°N 0.2073°W		Benfields was a pre-Conquest manor in the parish of Hangleton. It had a farm until 1871, when cottages replaced it, but this 18th-century barn survives. Flint walls with brick quoins support a clay-tiled gabled roof.	
Bevendean Hospital (former): gates, gate piers and walls	Bear Road; 50.8385°N 0.1131°W		These structures are the only surviving parts of the hospital complex, built in 1881 as a sanatorium. It grew to become a 127-bed facility with psychiatric wards, but was closed in September 1990. Sussex Beacon, a care centre for people with HIV/AIDS, stands on the site. The gate piers and walls have horizontal bands of red brick and painted stone, egg-and-dart decoration and Art Nouveau-style motifs.	
Bishop Hannington Memorial Church	West Blatchington; 50.8428°N 0.1871°W		Edward Maufe's simplified Modern Gothic parish church of 1938–39 commemorates local man James Hannington, Bishop of East Equatorial Africa, who was murdered in Uganda. Brown brick is the main material; the chancel floor is travertine. The church has an Italian-style campanile.	
Black Horse Inn	Rottingdean; 50.8047°N 0.0582°W		"Ye Olde Black Horse" (formerly the Black Hole) was built in 1513 and incorporates a former forge. The timber-framed structure now has a plastered and stuccoed exterior. The upper floor is partly jettied above the south entrance. The windows may be 19th-century replacements.	
1–3 Black Lion Lane	The Lanes; 50.8213°N 0.1417°W		Most of the fabric of these cottages, down an extremely narrow twitten, was renewed in the 18th and 20th centuries, but the jettying on the upper storey may be pre-17th century. The cottages are timber-framed with timber panelling on the ground floor. Above this, slates are hung as tiles on the walls. There is a single mansard roof.	
Blacksmiths Cottage	Rottingdean; 50.8054°N 0.0578°W		This single house (formerly two cottages) stands next to the site of the blacksmith's forge on Vicarage Lane, which loops around the village around the east side of the green. It has two storeys, a weatherboarded and plastered exterior, sash windows and a hipped roof.	
1–13 Bloomsbury Place^{[A]}	Kemptown; 50.8186°N 0.1232°W		The west side of this narrow three-sided square, dating from about 1810, has cast-iron balconies along its length, but the original bow windows were replaced later in the 19th century by canted bay windows. Each house has a stuccoed exterior and four floors.	
15–18 Bloomsbury Place^{[A]}	Kemptown; 50.8189°N 0.1230°W		These form the centrepiece of Bloomsbury Place. Rising to three storeys plus an attic (except number 15, which lacks an attic), and with a two-window range, these stuccoed houses have stepped round-headed entrances. Number 16 has large quoins on its side walls.	
19–31 Bloomsbury Place^{[A]}	Kemptown; 50.8188°N 0.1228°W		The 13 houses of the east side of Bloomsbury Place have four floors with one window each—mostly canted bays with flat headers. Numbers 24 to 27 originally formed a central group with pilasters and a pediment, but little remains of these. Cast-iron balconies span the first-floor level, as on the west side.	
Bollards at 8 Wykeham Terrace	West Hill; 50.8246°N 0.1448°W		Erected in the early 19th century on the path leading to St Nicholas' Church, this pair of cast-iron bollards are fluted at the top.	
Bollards at Kensington Gardens (north end)	North Laine; 50.8269°N 0.1385°W		This pair of 19th-century cast-iron bollards prevent traffic entering the pedestrianised Kensington Gardens. At the bottom, they are decorated with acanthus motifs.	
Bollard at Kensington Gardens (south end)	North Laine; 50.8257°N 0.1390°W		This is identical to the pair at the north end of Kensington Gardens. The road developed in the first decade of the 19th century, and the single bollard dates from later that century.	
Bollards next to Regency Tavern	Brighton; 50.8230°N 0.1488°W		This pair of 19th-century cast-iron bollards stand in a passageway leading to Regency Square. Both are fluted along their length, and one has the name of its local founder at the bottom. On 31 December 2012, one was broken and was replaced with a smaller plain bollard instead of a facsimile, causing controversy locally.	
2 Bond Street	Brighton; 50.8232°N 0.1405°W		The mid-19th-century street, connecting North and Church Streets, was briefly called New Street. This house, now a shop with a flat above, was built in the early 19th century of brick (now painted over). The three-window range retains its original sashes. Inside, an original staircase leads to the attic.	
3 Bond Street	Brighton; 50.8233°N 0.1405°W		Neither the ground-floor shop unit nor the tiled roof of this early-19th-century converted house are original, but some of the sash windows are. The building has a cornice with a dentil pattern.	
4 and 5 Bond Street	Brighton; 50.8234°N 0.1405°W		With their bow windows and parapets, these have described as "grander" than their neighbours, to which they are linked. Shopfronts have been added in the 20th century, but the slate-tiled roofs and staircases are original (although parts of the latter are missing in both buildings).	
6, 6a, 7 and 7a Bond Street	Brighton; 50.8235°N 0.1404°W		These early-19th-century converted cottages have flint and brickwork as well as stucco. The first-floor windows are bays with original three-part sashes. The attic space above the second floor has dormer windows.	
9 Bond Street	Brighton; 50.8236°N 0.1405°W		Also known as Bond Street Cottages, this three-part building of the early 19th century has a three-storey façade to Bond Street, with canted bay windows and a parapet; a brick-built three-storey wing with arched entrances and windows; and a smaller brick and weatherboarded wing with a single sash window.	
14 Bond Street	Brighton; 50.8239°N 0.1402°W		This was built early in the 19th century but has been altered. The façade is stucco, hiding red brickwork. An original shopfront, with some ironwork, survives at ground-floor level. Above this, there are two floors with 19th-century sash windows.	
15 and 16 Bond Street	Brighton; 50.8240°N 0.1402°W		These 19th-century terraced houses, again converted into shops, have two storeys of painted brick above their modern shopfronts. The first-floor windows are canted.	
Booth Museum of Natural History^{[D]}	Prestonville; 50.8373°N 0.1527°W		In 1874, naturalist Edward Booth built a long, shed-like Romanesque Revival structure in the grounds of his house on Dyke Road, to display his collection of 300 specimens. It was donated to Brighton Corporation in 1890, and now has more than 500,000 exhibits. The exterior is polychromatic brick with a full-width porch and arched doorways with voussoirs.	
3 Borough Street	Montpelier; 50.8255°N 0.1542°W		The parliamentary borough of Brighton was created in 1832 when this street, off Western Road, was being built—hence its name. Number 3 is a small stuccoed house with a modern replacement roof and a single bay window on both storeys. There are two side panes with sash windows, divided by a wide mullion. The door is under a cornice-style hood mould.	
8–13 Borough Street	Montpelier; 50.8259°N 0.1539°W		These terraced cottages have single bay windows, stuccoed façades and chimneys at irregular intervals on the mostly renewed tiled roofs. Number 12 has an extra window in the form of an oculus.	
16 Borough Street	Montpelier; 50.8260°N 0.1539°W		Similar in design to number 3, this two-storey cottage has a large bay window on each floor, a flat-headed doorway with a rectangular fanlight below a small cornice supported on corbels, and a slate roof with large eaves.	
20–24 Borough Street	Montpelier; 50.8262°N 0.1538°W		Number 20 retains its original slate roof and has an extra oculus at first-floor level; otherwise, these terraced cottages are identical, with two storeys, renewed roofs, chimneys, bay windows and stuccoed façades.	
Boundary stone at Boundary Passage	Montpelier; 50.8260°N 0.1549°W		This is one of several markers erected in the early 19th century at the boundaries of Brighton's old ecclesiastical parish. The granite block has bp (Brighton Parish) carved on its face and the boundary line across its top, which is about 3.25 feet (0.99 m) above the ground.	
Boundary stone at Montpelier Place	Montpelier; 50.8267°N 0.1544°W		At the north end of Boundary Passage, this 1.7-foot (0.52 m) rectangular painted granite stone has the boundary line carved into its sides and top and bp inscribed on the front.	
Boundary stone at Temple Gardens	Montpelier; 50.8282°N 0.1534°W		This rectangular stone, about 1 foot (0.30 m) tall and 0.75 feet (0.23 m) wide, is now partly buried. bp is inscribed on the left of the central dividing line; hp (Hove Parish) is on the right. The stone was set in the wall in the 19th century.	
Boundary stone at Whitehawk Road	Black Rock; 50.8176°N 0.1066°W		This 1.7-foot (0.52 m) granite stone dates from the 19th century and has engraved boundary lines and bp on its front. It stands at the corner of Roedean and Whitehawk Roads, and marks the historic boundary between Brighton and Ovingdean parishes. The latter became part of Brighton in 1928.	
2 Boyce's Street	Brighton; 50.8222°N 0.1438°W		This is now in commercial use, and the 19th-century façade hides an older building. Originally a house, it was an eye hospital for 14 years in the mid-19th century. The entrance is ogee-headed, and there are bow windows, Ionic pilasters and a tiled roof.	
Brighton and Hove High School (Old Vicarage)	Montpelier; 50.8276°N 0.1525°W		This was built by the firm of Cheesman & Son for Rev. Henry Michell Wagner, the Vicar of Brighton, who occupied it for many years. It is now the High School's sixth form. The stuccoed Tudor Revival building dates from about 1835, and retains an original oak staircase.	
Brighton and Hove High School (The Temple)	Montpelier; 50.8280°N 0.1514°W		Attributed to Amon Wilds, this was built in 1819 as Thomas Read Kemp's house. The dimensions were based on those of Solomon's Temple. It became a boys' academy in the 1830s and a girls' school in 1880. Major alterations began in 1911, but Egyptian-style touches remain on the exterior.	
Brighton and Hove Reform Synagogue	Hove; 50.8296°N 0.1627°W		Jews aligned with the movement for Reform Judaism started meeting in Hove in 1955. In 1966, architect Derek Sharp was commissioned to design a permanent synagogue for the congregation. It was consecrated on 10 September 1967. It contains a very early Holocaust memorial in the form of stained glass designed by John Petts. The four-storey building, of "bold form with a distinctive roof profile", is built of reinforced concrete clad in brick.	
Brighton Aquarium^{[G]}	Brighton; 50.8195°N 0.1352°W		Work on this attraction began in 1869, instigated by Eugenius Birch. The Victorian High Gothic complex was ready in 1872 and became very popular. A complete revamp in 1927–29 in a French Neoclassical style was followed by frequent upgrades, changes of ownership and new exhibits. Since 1991 it has housed the Brighton Sea Life Centre.	
Brighton College: Burstow Gallery and Hall	Kemptown; 50.8212°N 0.1228°W		The college complex is the largest set of Gothic Revival buildings in the city. This hall, by F.T. Cawthorn and dating from 1913 to 1914 (later than the other buildings) is in the Perpendicular style with flint and red brick in a chequerboard pattern. There is a king post roof.	
Brighton College Chapel	Kemptown; 50.8211°N 0.1221°W		The chapel was designed by George Gilbert Scott and opened in September 1859. T.G. Jackson, a college alumnus, extended the east end in 1922–23 in commemoration of Old Brightonian victims of World War I. The stone and flint building still has Scott's nave and east window, but not his chancel. The Morris & Co. stained glass is of 1920s vintage.	
Brighton College: Chichester House, School House and Dawson Hall	Kemptown; 50.8207°N 0.1228°W		T.G. Jackson's work of 1883–87 was added to by F.T. Cawthorn in 1929–30. The style matched Scott's earlier work but was more elaborate, although an intended tower above the south-facing entrance archways was never built. The other parts are dormitories and offices.	
Brighton College: Classroom, Dining Hall and Headmaster's House	Kemptown; 50.8211°N 0.1213°W		The classrooms were Scott's first work after the college was founded on 27 June 1848; he added headmaster's house in 1853–54; and another architect designed the partly timber-framed dining hall. The flint and Caen stone materials were matched in all later buildings in the college complex. There are many gabled dormer windows and two-light lancets.	
Brighton College of Technology (former)^{[E]}	Hanover; 50.8297°N 0.1326°W		Francis May's former Municipal Technical College of 1895, whose origins lie in an 1850s art school in the Royal Pavilion, was added to in 1909 and 1935. A consistent Jacobean Renaissance style, with widespread use of terracotta, was used at all stages. Centrally placed under a cornice is the wording municipal technical college. The college is now based elsewhere in Brighton under a different name, and May's building became flats in 2007.	
Brighton Forum	Round Hill; 50.8332°N 0.1345°W		The Habershon brothers, William and Edward, were commissioned in 1854 by the Diocese of Chichester to build a training college for female schoolteachers. Their knapped flint Gothic Revival building was extended in 1886. The Royal Engineers were based in it during World War II, and used it as their record office until 1987. It was later converted into serviced offices.	
Brighton Friends Meeting House	The Lanes; 50.8219°N 0.1411°W		The city's Quaker place of worship dates from 1805 but was greatly altered in the Victorian era, particularly when local architects Clayton & Black added a wing in 1876–77. The brick building is topped with a central pediment and has an adjoining cottage.	
Brighton General Hospital: Arundel Building	Elm Grove; 50.8313°N 0.1144°W		Brighton's former workhouse was built at the top of Elm Grove in 1865–67 by local architect George Maynard and the London firm of J.C. and G. Lansdown. This Italianate building, the first part of the complex, became a hospital in 1935 and was given its present name in 1948. The four-storey stuccoed building has a 37-window range, several gables, clock tower with cupola and a pediment with carved dolphins.	
Brighton, Hove and Preston United Omnibus Company Electric Bus Garage and Recharging Station (former)	Kemptown; 50.8197°N 0.1239°W		Local architects Clayton & Black designed this modest single-storey brick-built garage in 1908 for the Brighton, Hove and Preston United Omnibus Company (predecessors of the present Brighton & Hove bus company). It was used to recharge the company's fleet of electric buses, which were introduced from mid-1909. With minimal alteration it later became a standard bus garage and then a garage and repair shop for private motor vehicles.	
5, 6 and 6a Brighton Place	The Lanes; 50.8216°N 0.1402°W		This small area of high ground was built up by the 17th century, but these late-18th-century houses (now shops) are the oldest survivors. Number 6, formerly Market House, bears the inscription God bless George IV. The sash windows are irregularly placed on the shared stuccoed façade, and the doorways are arched.	
7 and 8 Brighton Place	The Lanes; 50.8217°N 0.1402°W		Converted into a shop in the 20th century, these are contemporary with their neighbours. Number 8 has a first-floor bay window; this and others are sashes, and some have architraves. The roof is not continuous: number 8's is tiled, while number 7's is of slate.	
Brighton Regency Synagogue (former)^{[C]}	Kemptown; 50.8213°N 0.1310°W		Brighton's first permanent synagogue was designed by Jewish architect David Mocatta in 1836–38 (replacing a temporary building on the same site), but was superseded by one in Middle Street in 1875. It was in commercial use until its conversion into flats in 2005. The Classical-style stuccoed building has Tuscan pilasters and a large pediment with jews synagogue am 5598 (its founding year in the Hebrew calendar).	
Brighton Town Hall^{[A]}	The Lanes; 50.8208°N 0.1402°W		Viciously criticised when new for its severe Greek Revival design (by Thomas Cooper in 1830–32), and now not used for some of its original functions, this large T-shaped building has a double façade; both have Ionic and Doric porticos. Francis May extended it in 1898. Modern (1980s) developments surround and overshadow the building.	
Brighton Unitarian Church	North Laine; 50.8239°N 0.1396°W		Amon Henry Wilds built this brick and stucco chapel for the Unitarian community in 1820. The "relatively pure Grecian" exterior, with its four giant Doric columns and a tetrastyle portico, leads to a simple late-19th-century interior. There is a World War I memorial window inside.	
Brighton War Memorial	Brighton; 50.8213°N 0.1370°W		Local architect Sir John Simpson's World War I memorial in Valley Gardens was erected in 1922 and unveiled on 7 October that year by David Beatty, 1st Earl Beatty. The names of Brighton's 2,600 victims are engraved on bronze pylons (designed by H. Cashmore) which flank the pale stone Italianate/Classical-style columned and domed pool. This was designed to resemble a Roman water garden, and also has a fountain. The four banks of columns stand at the north end and have an inscribed screen as their centrepiece; the names of battles and warzones from the War are engraved on it.	
Bristol Court	Kemptown; 50.8174°N 0.1196°W		Businessman William Hallett designed this hotel building on Marine Parade for himself in about 1835. It became flats and The Bristol pub a century later. The name refers to Frederick Hervey, 1st Marquess of Bristol, who owned the land. It rises to four and five storeys and is divided into four bays with curved fronts and three windows to each floor. The three bays to the right have a 19th-century iron balcony at first- and second-floor level, supported on slim colonnettes. Some windows are sashes, some have cornices above and all have architraves.	
9 Bristol Gardens	Kemp Town; 50.8183°N 0.1103°W		Built as a single house but now subdivided, this early-19th-century brick building stands behind Sussex Square. There are two flat-headed sash windows on each floor; those on the ground floor flank a pediment-topped doorcase. An entablature and cornice separate the brickwork from the slate roof.	
28 and 29 Bristol Road	Kemptown; 50.8191°N 0.1263°W		Although altered by later shopfronts and other additions, these are listed "as a very rare surviving example of an early-19th-century livery stables building". They date from the early part of that century and have stone and pebble tarred walls with some brickwork. The U-shaped building surrounds a courtyard which is reached through four archways. The windows, some of which are blank, are randomly placed on all three sides.	
Bristol Road Methodist Church (former)^{[A]}	Kemptown; 50.8196°N 0.1245°W		Thomas Lainson's Romanesque Revival church of 1873, for the Wesleyan Methodist community in the east of Brighton, was used for worship until 1989; it is now owned by Brighton College. Brown brick predominates, but polychrome brickwork is found in the dressings and other decoration. The three-stage corner tower has round-arched windows and is topped with a small octagonal spire. Next to this is an arcade-style entrance porch with a stair turret at the side.	
Britannia Corner	Brighton; 50.8271°N 0.1420°W		This was listed specifically to restrict the impact of office construction work next to it. It forms part of an 1840s-vintage bow-fronted terrace of three-storey houses at the junction of Queens Road and Upper Gloucester Road, near Brighton railway station. A modern shopfront sits below paired bow windows with original sashes.	
British Engineerium: former Coal Shed	West Blatchington; 50.8441°N 0.1754°W		This two-storey (including one subterranean floor) slate-roofed brick building now forms part of the museum complex, but it was built as a storage facility for the pumping station in 1872. The round-arched entrance is set below a gable.	
British Engineerium: former Cooling Pond and Leat	West Blatchington; 50.8447°N 0.1756°W		The former Goldstone Pumping Station in Hove, built in the 1860s, had a cooling pond and a leat (an artificial waterway) in its grounds. Although the complex is now a museum, the structures survive. The leat runs round three sides of the 1,100-square-foot (100 m^{2}) pool, which is built of brick and terracotta.	
British Engineerium: walls at former Pumping Station	West Blatchington; 50.8447°N 0.1748°W		These coursed stone walls, contemporary with the rest of the complex, enclose the British Engineerium's buildings. There is also some brickwork, and the gates are of iron. The south-facing wall has a drinking fountain inserted in an archway.	
14 Broad Street^{[A]}	Brighton; 50.8208°N 0.1348°W		Broad Street was laid out in the 1790s as a development of lodging houses, and this three-storey house (with a dormer window above) is faced with mathematical tiles—a characteristic feature of Brighton's architecture. It also has sash windows set into segmental bays. The roof is of a gambrel design.	
1–7 Brunswick Place and 31b Western Road^{[A]}	Brunswick Town; 50.8255°N 0.1589°W		Amon Henry Wilds and Charles Busby designed these four stucco-faced brick houses next to Brunswick Square at the same time (the late 1820s). They have been subdivided into flats and commercial units. Each has a three-bay façade to each of four storeys, with bow fronts, cornices, cast-iron balconies at first-floor level with acanthus decoration, and sash windows.	
2–8 Brunswick Place and 30a, 30b and 30c Western Road^{[A]}	Brunswick Town; 50.8254°N 0.1580°W		Standing on the southeast side of this short street, between Western Road and Brunswick Square, these four (now converted) houses are contemporary with the four opposite and were also built by Wilds and Busby around 1828. Apart from some of the detailing around their doors, the structural features are identical to those of the opposite terrace.	
9–69 Brunswick Place and 107–109 Western Road^{[D]}	Brunswick Town; 50.8258°N 0.1589°W		The terraces on the northern part of Brunswick Place (formerly Upper Brunswick Place) are newer than the rest of the Brunswick Town development: they were built in stages between about 1840 and 1855. They are of stuccoed brick with slate roofs, and are mostly bay-fronted. Cornices, pilasters around the doors and sash windows are common to all houses.	
10–70 Brunswick Place and 110 Western Road^{[F]}	Brunswick Town; 50.8264°N 0.1580°W		Although started about 20 years after the Wilds and Busby partnership's work on the southern part of Brunswick Place, these houses share the same style. The terrace climbs a hill, as demonstrated by the constantly rising run of cast-iron balconies at first-floor level. The houses have a three-window range and either three or four storeys, and are stuccoed with some rustication.	
1–30 Brunswick Road^{[D]}	Hove; 50.8255°N 0.1567°W		Numbers 29 and 30 were once a preparatory school at which Winston Churchill spent several happy years: he said "the impression of those years makes a pleasant picture in my mind, in strong contrast to my earlier schoolday memories". The mid-19th-century terrace of three-storey stucco-clad brick houses is bow-fronted and has a long cast-iron balustrade.	
31–58 Brunswick Road^{[D]}	Hove; 50.8261°N 0.1560°W		Nearly identical to the terrace on the opposite (west) side of the road, these three-storey brick and stucco houses date from the 1850s and have three storeys topped with parapets. Each has a two-window range set into a bow front. A long balustrade of iron runs along at first-floor level; below this is rusticated decoration. Some houses have been pebbledashed.	
64 Brunswick Street West	Brunswick Town; 50.8256°N 0.1601°W		Now part of the Brighton Institute of Modern Music (as BIMM House), this is Brunswick Town's original town hall. Completed at a cost of £3,000 in 1856, it became the town hall for all of Hove in 1873; but Alfred Waterhouse's Gothic Revival building on Church Road superseded it in 1882. The two-bay façade is stuccoed with stone and brickwork underneath. Some windows have cast-iron frames.	
5–19 Buckingham Place^{[B]}	West Hill; 50.8310°N 0.1462°W		Local artist Richard Henry Nibbs, noted for his marine art and paintings of Brighton, lived at number 7 in this Italianate-style terrace for two decades. A date of about 1845 has been attributed; the West Hill area developed around that time in response to the opening of the railway. The two-storey houses are stuccoed and have their straight-headed doorways set into recesses. Each house has a ground-floor iron balcony, with canopies except at number 7.	
30 and 32 Buckingham Place^{[B]}	West Hill; 50.8306°N 0.1438°W		Built at the same time as the Italianate houses in nearby Montpelier Villas, this pair of semi-detached houses are of a similar design. Standing behind flint, brick and stucco walls which form part of the listing, they have balustraded balconies, rustication, canted windows and pilasters.	
47 Buckingham Place^{[B]}	West Hill; 50.8310°N 0.1441°W		This is an end-of-terrace house dating, like much of Buckingham Place, from the mid-1840s. The stuccoed, partly rusticated building rises to three storeys and has sash windows set into canted bays. The doorcase has Doric pilasters. A covered balcony with anthemion-style ironwork runs across the house at first-floor level.	
49 Buckingham Place^{[C]}	West Hill; 50.8310°N 0.1437°W		The former Compton Lodge is also known as St Anne's House, and now consists of flats. Before its residential conversion, it used to be a convent with a built-in observatory; it housed disabled children for a time as well. Dating from about 1820, it is older than the surrounding houses. The building has four storeys, a Doric-columned porch, and a second-floor cornice with dentil patterning. Later extensions have matched the original style.	
31 Buckingham Road^{[B]}	West Hill; 50.8295°N 0.1440°W		Listed principally for its historic importance as the birthplace (on 21 August 1872) of Aubrey Beardsley, this three-storey 19th-century house stands on a corner site. It has a tiled roof and stuccoed exterior with rustication, a doorcase with entablature and pilasters, and architraved windows on one side.	
45–58 Buckingham Road^{[C]}	West Hill; 50.8300°N 0.1435°W		Ventnor Villas in Hove has a nearly identical, although shorter, run of terraced villas. The Classically inspired mid-1850s houses have paired square bays, Doric-style antae, parapets with balustrades and extensive friezework.	
Burial vaults and tomb at St Nicholas' Church Graveyard	West Hill; 50.8257°N 0.1465°W		Opened in 1841, this was the third extension to the former parish church's graveyard. Amon Henry Wilds designed the long row of stone rubble Tudor–Gothic vaults along the north side. Each of the 14 bays is separated by a pinnacled buttress. The contemporary stone tomb of Sir Richard Phillips is included in the listing.	
1 Burlington Street	Kemptown; 50.8184°N 0.1242°W		Amon Wilds and Charles Busby are believed to be the architects of this end-of-terrace four-storey house, whose upper storey is an attic. It dates from the mid-1820s, and like the nearby terrace at numbers 4–7 Burlington Street it has a single-window range to the right of the entrance, an entablature and a balcony with iron railings. The walls are of stucco.	
4–7 Burlington Street	Kemptown; 50.8185°N 0.1241°W		This terrace of four houses date from about 1825 and were probably built by Amon Wilds and Charles Busby during their productive partnership. Each house has three floors, stuccoed walls, slate roofs with dormer windows and iron balconies (formerly with verandahs). The entrances—round-arched except at number 4—are set to the left, and single bay windows stand to their right. The lowest storeys are rusticated.	
23–26 Burlington Street^{[A]}	Kemptown; 50.8185°N 0.1244°W		Max Miller lived at number 25 for 15 years until his death in 1963; this is commemorated by a plaque. Number 26 has a two-window façade, while the others have one to each of their three storeys. Number 23 has been attributed to the Wilds and Busby partnership. The houses are slate-roofed and stuccoed.	

== See also ==
- Buildings and architecture of Brighton and Hove
- Grade I listed buildings in Brighton and Hove
- Grade II* listed buildings in Brighton and Hove
- List of conservation areas in Brighton and Hove
