= List of locations in Brighton and Hove =

This is a list of the locations within the city of Brighton and Hove.

== A ==
Adelaide, Aldrington

== B ==
Bear Road area, Bevendean, Black Rock, Brighton, Brighton Marina (a.k.a. Brighton Marina Village), Brunswick

== C ==
Coldean

== E ==
East Brighton, East Moulsecoomb, Elm Grove

== F ==
Fiveways

== G ==
Goldsmid

== H ==
Hangleton, Hanover, Hollingbury, Hollingdean, Hove

== K ==
Kemp Town (the Regency housing development), Kemptown (the wider neighbourhood), The Knoll

== L ==
The Lanes

== M ==
Mile Oak, Moulsecoomb

== N ==
New England Quarter, North Laine, North Moulsecoomb

== O ==
Ovingdean

== P ==
Patcham, Portslade-by-Sea, Portslade Village, Preston, Preston Park, Prestonville

== Q ==
Queen's Park

== R ==
Roedean, Round Hill, Rottingdean

== S ==
Saltdean, Seven Dials, Stanford, Stanmer, Stanmer Park, Surrenden

== T ==
Tongdean

== U ==
Upper Bevendean

== V ==
Varndean

== W ==
West Blatchington, West Hill, Westdene, Whitehawk, Withdean, Woodingdean
