= Fiveways =

Fiveways may refer to:

- Fiveways, Brighton, England, a road junction and locality
- Normanby Fiveways, a road junction in the north of Brisbane, Australia
- Woolloongabba Fiveways, a road junction in the south of Brisbane, Australia

== See also ==
- Five Ways (disambiguation)
