= Five Ways =

Five Ways may refer to:

== Places ==
- Five Ways, Birmingham, a city area in England
  - Five Ways railway station, in Birmingham
  - Five Ways tram stop, in Birmingham
- Five Ways, Paddington, a junction in Sydney, Australia
- Five Ways, Victoria, a locality in Devon Meadows, Australia

== Other uses ==
- Five Ways (Aquinas) or Quinque viæ, arguments for God's existence
- King Edward VI Five Ways School, a state grammar school in Birmingham, England

== See also ==
- Fiveways (disambiguation)
- Tipton Five Ways railway station
