= Astoria Theatre, Brighton =

Astoria Theatre
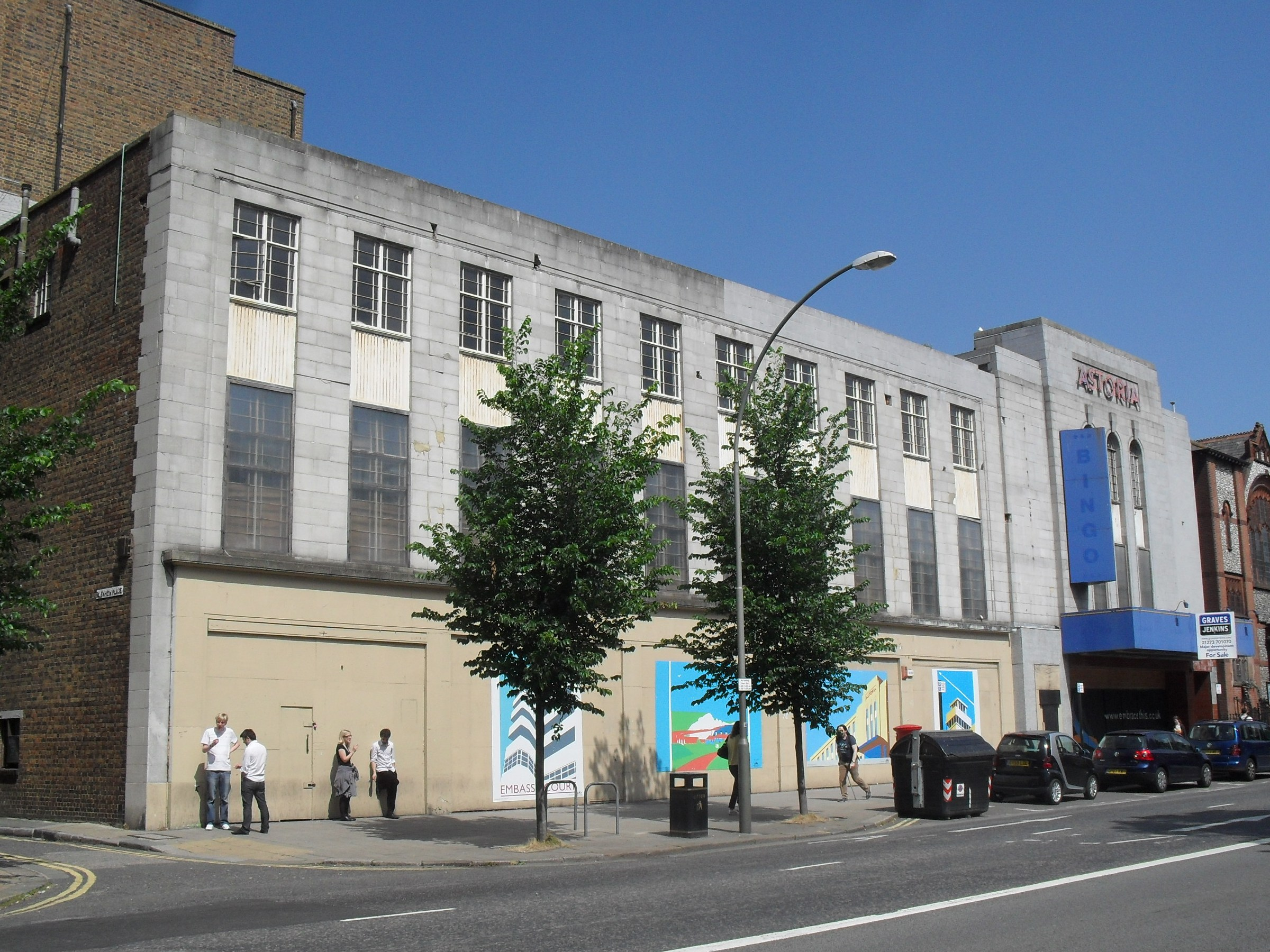
- The building in 2010, seen from the southeast

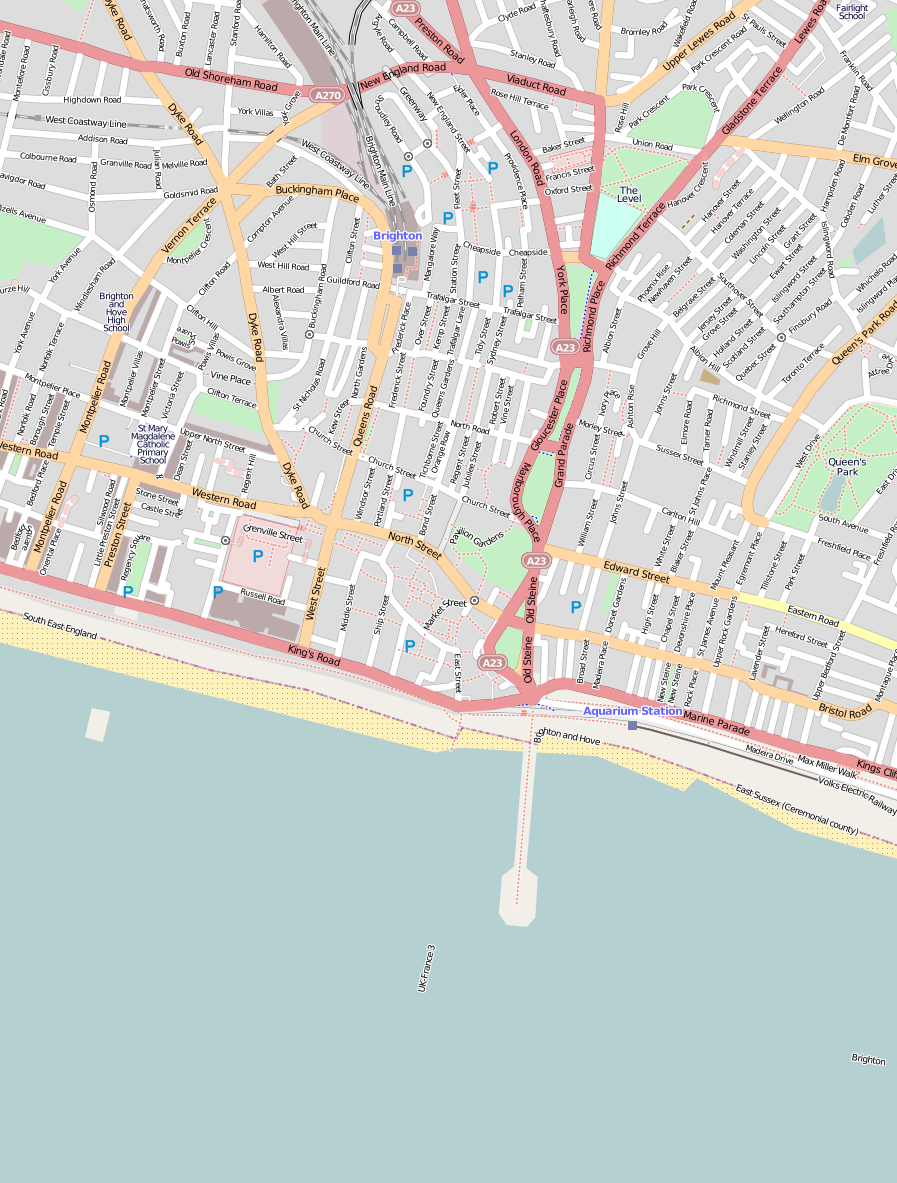
- Location within central Brighton
- 50.8261°N 0.1362°W
- Location: 10–14 Gloucester Place, Brighton, England

History
- Built: 1933
- Built for: E.E. Lyons
- Demolished: 2018
- Rebuilt: 1958; 1977

Site notes
- Architect: Edward A. Stone
- Architectural style: Art Deco

Listed Building – Grade II
- Official name: The Astoria Theatre
- Designated: 22 November 2000
- Reference no.: 1247234

The Astoria Theatre was a former cinema in Brighton, part of the English coastal city of Brighton and Hove. Built in 1933 in the Art Deco style for a local entertainment magnate who opened one of Brighton's first cinemas many years earlier, it was the first and most important expansion of the Astoria brand outside London. It initially struggled against the town's other "super-cinemas", but enjoyed a period of success in the 1950s and 1960s before rapid decline set in, culminating in its closure in 1977.

About 20 years of use as a bingo hall followed, but the building—whose clean lines gave "a sense of spacious grandeur" in a prominent city-centre site—stood empty from 2007 onward and passed through several owners. Permission was granted in 2012 for its demolition and replacement with an energy-efficient business centre designed by Conran and Partners, but several alternative plans were submitted subsequently and the building still stood until April 2018, when demolition work started. English Heritage listed the building at Grade II in 2000 for its architectural and historical importance.

== History ==
=== 1933–1977: Cinema ===
Brighton and neighbouring Hove hold an important place in the early history of British cinema. Pioneering cinematographers who lived and worked in the area in the late 19th and early 20th centuries included William Friese-Greene, George Albert Smith (who founded one of the world's first film studios at St Ann's Well Gardens in Hove) and Esmé Collings. Public performances of films were given at Hove Town Hall from 1895 and at a hall in Brighton from the following year. By 1910, two purpose-built cinemas existed; one, the Duke of York's Picture House, is still in use and is the oldest operational cinema in England. During the 1920s and 1930s, larger and larger cinemas were built as demand increased; an early "super cinema" was the Regent Cinema (1921), and the 2,500-seat Savoy followed in 1930.

The Astoria chain was well established in London by the early 1930s. Cinemas and theatres of that name were built in Brixton (now the Brixton Academy), Finsbury Park, Charing Cross Road, Old Kent Road and Streatham. All were designed by Edward Albert Stone. The brand was soon extended to seaside resorts across southeast England at the initiative of a group of businessmen led by E.E. Lyons. ("Teddy" Lyons had opened one of Brighton's earliest cinemas, the Academy, in 1911 and was well known in the town's entertainment scene.) The group, which also included Sussex Daily News proprietor J.H. Infield (who served as chairman of the Academy Cinema until 1926), had identified a site in 1932 when they planned to open a cinema under the Plaza brand. This did not happen, but in 1933 the consortium commissioned Edward Stone to build a "super cinema" under the Astoria name there. The site was on Gloucester Place, north of Old Steine, and a number of houses from the Georgian and Victorian eras were knocked down to make way. Work began on 17 July 1933 on the 1,823-seat building, which was designed as a combined theatre and cinema with a full stage and dressing rooms. Thursday 21 December 1933 was the opening night; Cooper Rawson mp and Margaret Hardy, respectively Brighton's Member of Parliament and Mayor, made the inaugural speeches. These were followed by a Movietone News newsreel, features by Pathé and Disney (Santa's Workshop) and the main film—The Private Life of Henry VIII starring Charles Laughton.

Lyons died in August 1934, having overseen the openings of new Astorias at Cliftonville and Purley and an ultimately abortive scheme in Worthing, another seaside resort near Brighton. In February 1935 the Brighton Astoria passed from independent ownership into the portfolio of ABC Cinemas, who had operated the Savoy in East Street since 1930. Initially it was one of Brighton's three main cinemas: along with the Savoy and the Regent, it had access to the best films. In 1937, though, the Odeon opened on West Street and took the Astoria's place among the elite; thereafter it was relegated to "B-circuit" status in ABC's portfolio, meaning it missed out on the most attractive films and could only book those which were not popular enough for the "A-circuit". It began to struggle: by 1939, schemes such as large price cuts and appearances by film stars were used to try to boost attendances. In August of that year, for example, Gene Autry was brought down to Brighton on a train and made a personal appearance, and Tod Slaughter visited for every showing of The Face at the Window, in which he starred. The following year, though, it secured the rights to Gone with the Wind, "the most eagerly awaited film in a decade", and was able to charge higher prices. Because of conditions imposed by the film's distributor, the Astoria was one of the few cinemas outside London to show it on its first run.

Cinemas in Brighton and elsewhere faced various difficulties in the 1950s. Television became popular, many cinema managers faced pay cuts, greater restrictions were placed on children visiting cinemas, and government regulations forced cinema buildings to be adapted to incorporate separate film-rewinding rooms if they wanted to show films recorded on older nitrocellulose film stock, which was flammable. Specific local problems included a smallpox epidemic which forced public buildings to close for several months, and the opening in 1953 of a popular "public television theatre" near the West Pier, which opened daily and showed television broadcasts on a large screen. Many cinemas in Brighton were forced to close. The Astoria initially carved out a niche by becoming the local centre for 3D films during the "golden era" of that technology. A special screen was fitted, and films such as House of Wax, Sangaree, The Maze and Kiss Me Kate had successful runs. Then in 1958 a major renovation took place with the aim of establishing the cinema as "a roadshow house for [showing] extended runs outside London's West End". The little used theatre facility was removed completely and the building became a dedicated cinema. A new, larger screen was erected in front of the proscenium, the Compton organ was taken out, the balconies were altered and some space was used to house a new projector, and the auditorium was hidden behind curtains. The changes, which cost £20,000 (£410,000 as of 2025) and reduced the capacity to 1,200, were completed during the summer, and on 2 August 1958 the Astoria reopened with a five-month run of South Pacific. No film had ever had such a long run in Brighton, and the cinema had further success with Gigi (1959), The Nun's Story (1959–60), Ben-Hur (1961) and Lawrence of Arabia (1962). Also, for several years until 1962, no other cinema in Sussex was able to show films recorded on 70 mm stock, so the Astoria dominated this market locally.

The 1960s was "the Astoria's finest decade". The succession of long runs of popular films continued with an eight-month showing of The Sound of Music (1965), an 11-month run of Doctor Zhivago (this opened on 23 June 1966, making it the first cinema outside London's West End to show the film) and a very early screening of 2001: A Space Odyssey (1968). During this period the Astoria was the main rival to the Regent in terms of prestige and popularity. Decline quickly set in during the 1970s, though. ABC focused its attention on the larger Savoy, which it rebranded with the ABC name in 1961. It received all the best films at the expense of the Astoria, and also supported longer runs. Nevertheless, its 2,500 capacity was excessive at a time when audiences were falling rapidly, and in 1975 it was closed for a year to be converted into four separate cinemas. During this time, the Astoria briefly regained its position of importance, and ABC's "A-circuit" films were shown. Another innovation was the use of Sensurround for the three-month screening of Earthquake in summer 1975. When the former Savoy reopened in 1976, though, the Astoria "was relegated to a small afterthought in joint press advertising". The last film, A Star is Born, ran from 31 March to 7 May 1977.

=== 1977–2007: Bingo, closure and dereliction ===
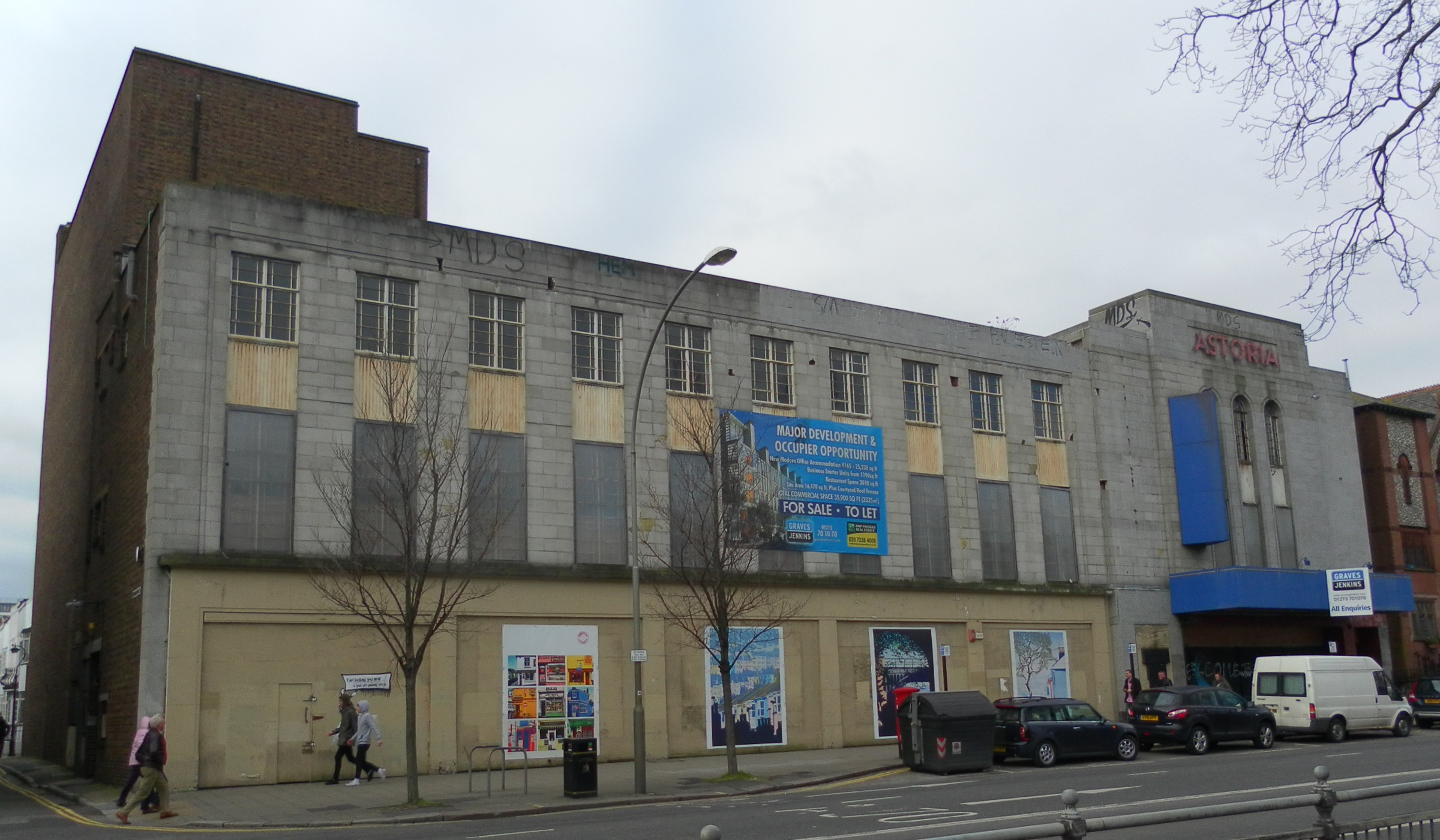
Seen in March 2013, the façade was boarded up and decorated with murals.

Entertainment company EMI bought the Astoria in 1976 and were granted a bingo licence. They carried out extensive works at a cost of £150,000 (£1,010,000 as of 2025)) to convert the building into a 1,000-capacity bingo hall: the stepped interior was flattened, the screen and projection equipment were removed and new furniture was put in. Less than two months after it closed as a cinema, the Astoria reopened in its new guise. By the 1980s it operated under the Coral Bingo brand, which changed to Gala Bingo in the 1990s. In 1997, Gala Coral Group built a new bingo hall at Eastern Road in the Kemptown area of Brighton, and the Astoria closed again.

In 1998, Bass Leisure Group submitted a plan to convert the building into a horror-themed nightclub; although planning permission was granted, the proposal foundered because a drinks licence was refused. Three years later, three members of Stomp, a Brighton-based percussion group, bought the Astoria for £1.1 million. They planned to spend up to £6 million renovating it and turning it into a concert and cabaret venue, but no work was carried out. Local businessman Mike Holland then bought the building for £2.2m in 2007. He owned several heritage buildings in the city, such as the Grade II*-listed British Engineerium in Hove—an 1860s water pumping station which had been turned into an industrial museum but which was threatened with demolition until he bought it for £1.25m in 2006 and restored it. The Astoria remained disused since he purchased it; it was put back on sale in March 2008 and remained empty thereafter. As part of a council-sponsored scheme to improve the visual appeal of empty buildings in the city, a local artist was commissioned in June 2010 to paint Art Deco-style murals on the Astoria's façade. Sussex landmarks such as Embassy Court, Shoreham Airport and the Seven Sisters cliffs, as well as the Astoria itself, were painted on the walls in a "1930s poster" style.

The building was listed at Grade II by English Heritage on 22 November 2000. This defined it as a "nationally important" building of "special interest". As of February 2001, it was one of 1,124 Grade II-listed buildings and structures, and 1,218 listed buildings of all grades, in the city of Brighton and Hove.

=== Demolition and planned redevelopment ===
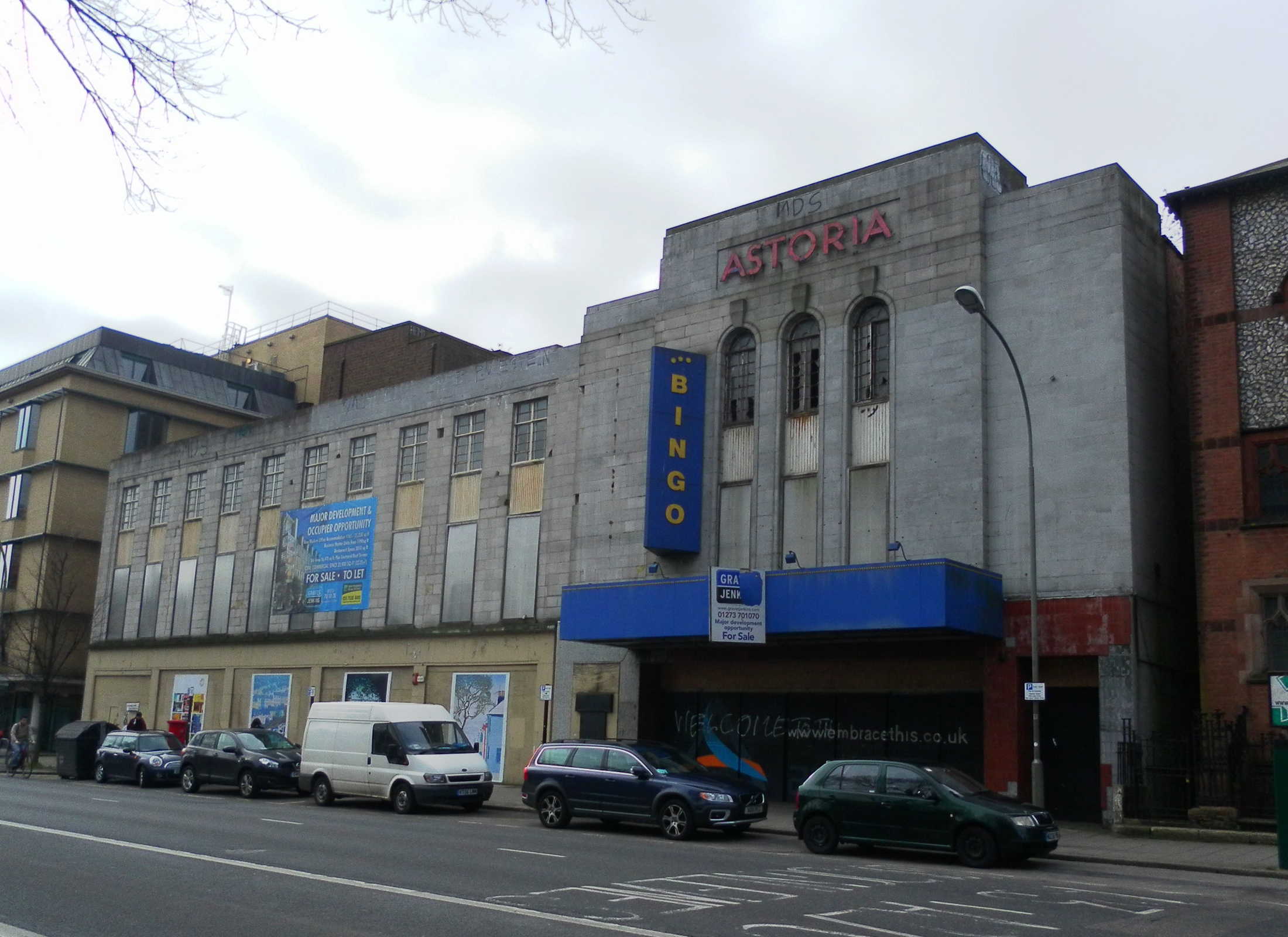
Seen from the northeast in March 2013, the façade retains its astoria and bingo signage.

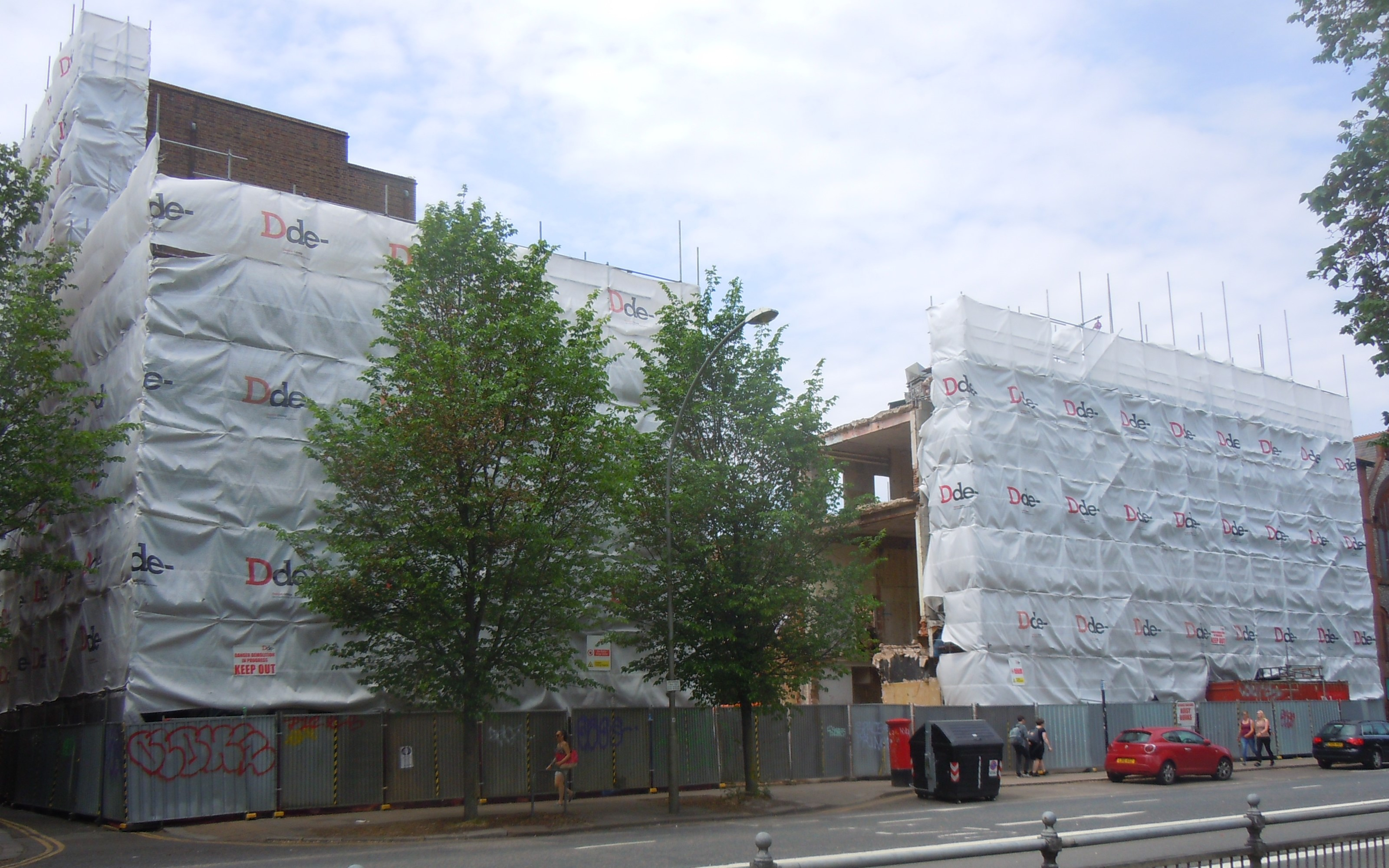
Demolition work was underway in May 2018.

An initial threat to demolish the Astoria and redevelop the site for housing was averted when the building was listed in 2000, prior to its purchase by members of Stomp. New proposals to demolish the building first came to light in August 2010, when developers Conran and Partners (acting as agents for Holland) organised a meeting with Brighton and Hove City Council to discuss a planning application they intended to submit. They proposed to replace the Astoria with a six-storey business centre. The planning application was lodged in December 2010. To justify the demolition of the Grade II-listed building (a status defined by English Heritage as having "national importance" and "special interest"), H3O Media Ltd—the company who would occupy and run the business centre—commissioned a surveyor to prepare a heritage report. This stated that the granting of listed status by English Heritage was "questionable" because the building was not unique to the area, and noted that many 1930s features had deteriorated or been removed—especially since 2000, when Grade II status was granted. Holland stated that the building had "had its day" and had declined to an irreparable state.

Although a decision on the planning application was originally expected in March 2011, it was not until September that year that the city council's planning committee authorised the Astoria's demolition. Furthermore, approval had to be given by Eric Pickles mp: as the Government's Communities Secretary, he made the final decision on all requests to demolish listed buildings. He gave consent in January 2012. The report considered by the council committee stated that at least £3.5 million would have to be spent on refurbishment, no suitable plans or schemes had been submitted by any person or organisation, and the building was "genuinely redundant".

The proposed development was described as a business centre and "media hub" with offices, community meeting facilities, a café, roof terrace and gardens. The developers stated that it would support about 170 jobs, encourage regeneration of the London Road/Valley Gardens area and provide the focus for a "creative café culture". Units aimed at startup companies would be included. Conran and Partners incorporated energy-saving schemes such as passive solar heating and rainwater harvesting into their design. English Heritage agreed with the surveyor that the building's historic interest had been reduced and that its dilapidated condition had made renovation unviable; restoration would have cost £3.5m according to the developer's estimates. Local community groups agreed with the proposal because of concerns that squatters would occupy the building if it continued to stand empty.

A revised planning application was submitted in December 2013. Although several elements remained the same, such as office accommodation, community facilities and a café/restaurant, the developers now included six flats in their proposal. These would be built at the top of the complex, which would rise to six storeys at the front and three storeys to the rear. No car parking would be provided, but bicycle parking was included in the new design. The city council was expected to decide on the application in March 2014, and in that month granted approval which remained valid as of May 2015; but in December 2014 Holland sold the building to Unicity, part of Knightsbridge Student Housing. This company submitted a new planning application in May 2015 in respect of a building consisting of 73 privately rented flats, offices and community space. The proposed housing density was significantly greater than that for which permission was granted in 2014. This scheme was permitted on appeal; but the building was subsequently sold on again to a company called Ktesius. Their plan for 70 luxury flats called Brighton Rox was granted approval in January 2017.

Demolition of the Astoria began in April 2018. Six months earlier it was stated that the new Brighton Rox development which would replace it would cover about 67,000 square feet (6,200 m^{2}) and would include shop and office units at ground-floor level and six storeys of flats above, with between one and four bedrooms. Cove Burgess Architects were commissioned to design the new building, which was scheduled to be completed at the end of 2019. The new development, also marketed as ROX Brighton, was ultimately finished in 2021.

== Location and assessment ==
Although Gloucester Place was laid out in the early 1800s, all of its buildings are now 20th-century. A 1980s office block (Trustcard House) adjoins the site of the Astoria on the south side; a flint and brick Baptist church of 1903 by George Baines stands to the north; and other nearby buildings include the elaborate Tudor Revival King and Queen pub and the Neo-Georgian Allied Irish Bank branch, both built in the 1930s and Grade II-listed. St Peter's Church, the landmark former parish church of Brighton, is also nearby.

With its 1,800-capacity auditorium, the Astoria was the largest cinema on the south coast of England and was classed as a "super-cinema". The Astoria chain, previously associated with London, expanded across several English seaside resorts; Brighton's was planned as the flagship. In assessing its importance, English Heritage also noted it was "the principal survivor" of the Astorias outside London.

The Astoria stood within the Valley Gardens Conservation Area, one of 34 conservation areas in the city of Brighton and Hove. This was designated by Brighton Council in 1973 and covers 92.84 acres (37.57 ha). The council's Conservation Area Study, published in September 1995, noted that it was the only remaining 1930s building in the immediate area. In contrast to more modern buildings such as Trustcard House, Lombard House and (on the opposite side of Valley Gardens) new houses and the University of Brighton's Art, Design and Humanities premises on Grand Parade, the Astoria "[was] much more appropriate in scale and respects the traditional vertical plot emphasis" of the older surrounding buildings.

== Architecture and fittings ==
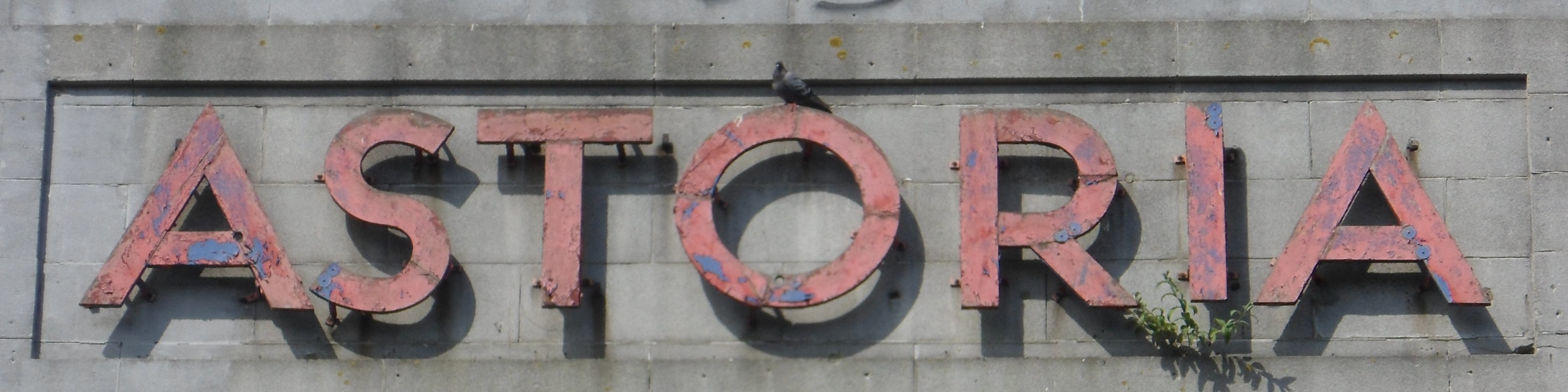
This original Art Deco-style sign (pictured in August 2013) survived on the exterior.

A souvenir brochure (Note: Reproduced in full at this reference:) produced for the opening night contained details of all companies and contractors involved in building and fitting out the Astoria. Edward Albert Stone was the architect, Griggs & Son Ltd of Westminster were the main building contractors, Major C.H. Bell acted as consultant engineer and local firm H. Lasenby Bros. were contracted to demolish and clear the site. The main concrete structure of the building was supplied by British Reinforced Concrete Engineering Co. Ltd of Stafford. The cast stone façade was produced by the Patent Impervious Stone and Construction Co Ltd of Leyton. Another London firm, Dawnay & Sons Ltd, provided the steelwork, but the brickwork was produced locally by the Sussex Brick Co. Ltd of Horsham. Tiling company Ramsdens of Westminster were responsible for the terrazzo floors and wall decoration, and the plasterwork was by H.E. Gaze Ltd of London. Two other London firms, the Carrier Engineering Co. Ltd and Berkeley Electrical Engineering Co. Ltd, respectively supplied ventilation and heating equipment and installed the electric systems and lighting. Furnishings were by W.W. Turner & Co. Ltd of Birmingham, and Henri & Laverdet Ltd (the firm of Marc-Henri Levy and Gaston Laverdet) were the interior designers. The John Compton Organ Co. of Acton installed the organ. Several other national and local firms supplied other products and services, from projectors to ticket machines.

Edward Stone was regarded as "a specialist theatre and cinema architect". He designed the Astoria in a French Art Deco style—similar to, but a "larger and more elaborate example" of, his Grade II-listed Whitehall Theatre (Note: Now the Trafalgar Studios.) in London. The walls were of brick with faience decoration and a façade of pale stone blocks, hiding a steel frame and topped by a flat roof. The "handsome" façade was 45 metres (148 ft) wide and was simply detailed, "avoiding gratuitous decoration" and instead "[relying] mainly on proportion to achieve a sense of spacious grandeur". It was in two parts: to the left (south), a slightly recessed ten-bay section with a strong horizontal emphasis, consisting of shop units (latterly boarded up) at ground-floor level, a tea-room above and offices on the top floor. Straight-headed casement windows with metal grilles lit this section. To the right (north) was the projecting entrance section which in contrast has a vertical emphasis: above the entrance canopy and modern double entrance door, three tall straight-headed windows at first-floor level were joined to tall arched windows above by fluted pilasters. The second-floor windows were set into moulded recesses with keystones. Above these, a slightly recessed panel bore the name astoria in projecting letters.

The "spectacular Art Deco interior" was luxurious but simple, again avoiding extravagant decoration. The original stage, dressing rooms, balconies and fly tower were behind the shops and offices of the south range; the auditorium was behind the entrance to the north. Moulded plasterwork, friezes and reliefs featured extensively. Gold and rose were the main colours used, and some textured Marb-l-Cote material survived until demolition.

== Cultural references ==
The façade of the derelict Astoria theatre features on the front cover of Brighton Darkness, a book of short stories by Brighton-based writer John Roman Baker. One of the stories, "Place of Dreams", takes place in the theatre in 1958 when it was a cinema. It features two adolescent boys, Nick and Gregg, who attend a screening of Invasion of the Saucer Men (also known as Invasion of the Hell Creatures). An epilogue at the end of the story laments the theatre's dereliction and anticipates the arrival of the real Hell Creatures: the property developers who will arrive to demolish the place of dreams.

== See also ==
- Grade II listed buildings in Brighton and Hove: A–B
- Media related to Astoria Theatre, Brighton at Wikimedia Commons

== Bibliography ==
- Antram, Nicholas; Morrice, Richard (2008). Brighton and Hove. Pevsner Architectural Guides. London: Yale University Press. ISBN 978-0-300-12661-7.
- Brighton Polytechnic. School of Architecture and Interior Design (1987). A Guide to the Buildings of Brighton. Macclesfield: McMillan Martin. ISBN 1-869-86503-0.
- Carder, Timothy (1990). The Encyclopaedia of Brighton. Lewes: East Sussex County Libraries. ISBN 0-86147-315-9.
- Chapman, Brigid (1996). Brighton in the Fifties. Lewes: The Book Guild. ISBN 1-85776-151-0.
- Collis, Rose (2010). The New Encyclopaedia of Brighton. (based on the original by Tim Carder) (1st ed.). Brighton: Brighton & Hove Libraries. ISBN 978-0-9564664-0-2.
- Eyles, Allen (2003). Brighton and Hove Cinemas. Images of England. Stroud: Tempus Publishing. ISBN 0-7524-3069-6.
- Nairn, Ian; Pevsner, Nikolaus (1965). The Buildings of England: Sussex. Harmondsworth: Penguin Books. ISBN 0-14-071028-0.
