= Brighton and Hove Reform Synagogue =

Reform synagogue in Hove, England

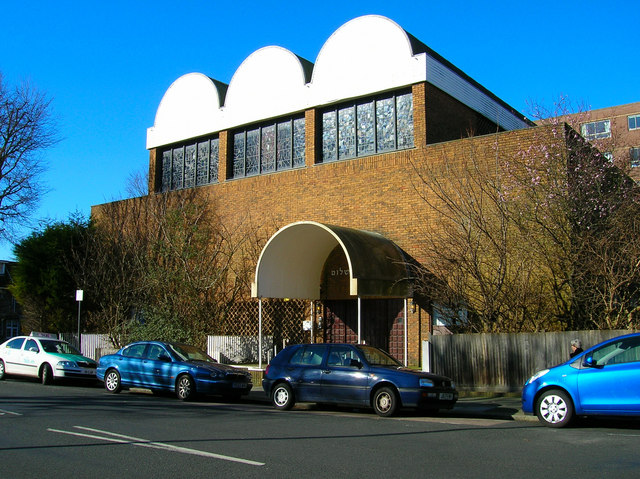
- The synagogue in 2007

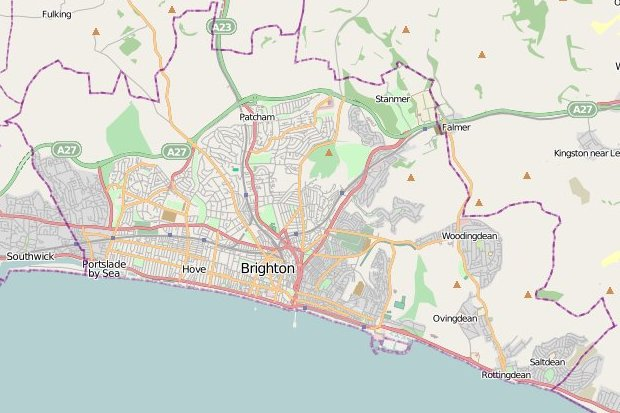
- Location of the synagogue in Brighton and Hove

Religion
- Affiliation: Reform Judaism
- Ecclesiastical or organizational status: Synagogue
- Leadership: Rabbi Dr Andrea Zanardo
- Status: Active

Location
- Location: Palmeira Avenue, Hove, East Sussex, England BN3 3GE
- Country: United Kingdom
- Interactive map of Brighton and Hove Reform Synagogue
- Coordinates: 50°49′46″N 0°09′46″W

Architecture
- Architect: Derek Sharp
- Type: Synagogue architecture
- Established: 1955 (as a congregation)
- Completed: 1967

Website
- bh-rs.org

The Brighton and Hove Reform Synagogue is a Reform Jewish congregation and synagogue, located on Palmeira Avenue, in Hove, East Sussex, England, in the United Kingdom.

== History and affiliation ==
The community was founded in 1955 with temporary accommodation and the synagogue was dedicated in 1967 to serve a rapidly growing community. The 400-capacity building was designed by Derek Sharp. A plaque indicates that the foundation stone was laid on 17 July 1966, or in the Hebrew calendar, 29 Tammuz 5726. It became the largest congregation in Brighton and Hove and one of the larger ones in the Reform Movement.

The first rabbi to serve the community was Rabbi Rosenblum who developed a style of prayer which combined a sense of tradition with mixed sex seating and inclusion of English beside a mainly Hebrew rendering of the service. In 2011 members of the synagogue voted in favour of equal rights for women congregants.

The synagogue is a member of the Movement for Reform Judaism. In 2012, it was reported that the congregation had 500 adult members.

The synagogue was listed at Grade II by Historic England on 2 April 2025. This defines it as a "nationally important" building of "special interest".

== Rabbi ==
The rabbi of the congregation, since September 2012, is Dr. Andrea Zanardo. Zanardo was born in Varese and was among the founders of the first Italian Progressive Congregation while studying for his PhD. He was ordained in July 2012 after rabbinical studies at Leo Baeck College.

== See also ==
- Grade II listed buildings in Brighton and Hove: A–B
- History of the Jews in England
- List of Jewish communities in the United Kingdom
- List of places of worship in Brighton and Hove
- List of synagogues in the United Kingdom
