= Bear Road, Brighton =

Area of Brighton, England

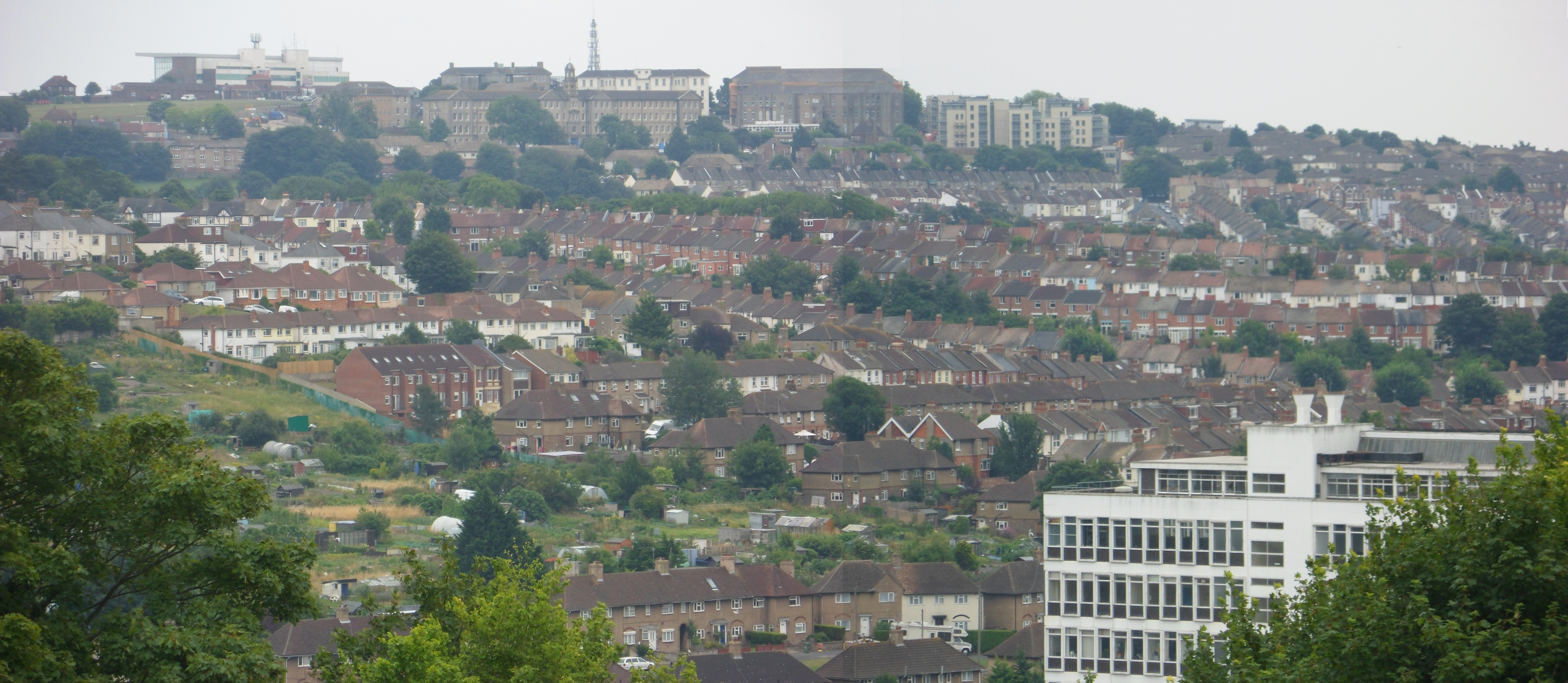
The Bear Road area is characterised by dense terraced housing. This view is taken from Hollingbury Hill on the other side of the Lewes Road valley.

The Bear Road area is a largely residential area in the east of Brighton, part of the English city of Brighton and Hove. Centred on the steep west–east road of that name, it is characterised by terraced houses of the early 20th century, but Brighton's main cemeteries were established here in the 19th century and there is also some industry.

Bear Road itself, a steeply sloping route running from the main Brighton–Lewes road eastwards towards Brighton Racecourse, divides the area into two contrasting sections. North of the road, the bare hillside was developed with densely populated streets of small houses from 1895 onwards. Development was effectively complete within 20 years, and most of the roads have names connected to the Boer War, giving the suburb "a strong sense of place". Other surviving buildings include some large early-20th-century factories, but an isolation hospital and the area's only church have both been demolished since 1990. South of Bear Road, a series of cemeteries and crematoria were built on a large, undulating area of farmland between 1850 and 1919.

== Location and topography ==
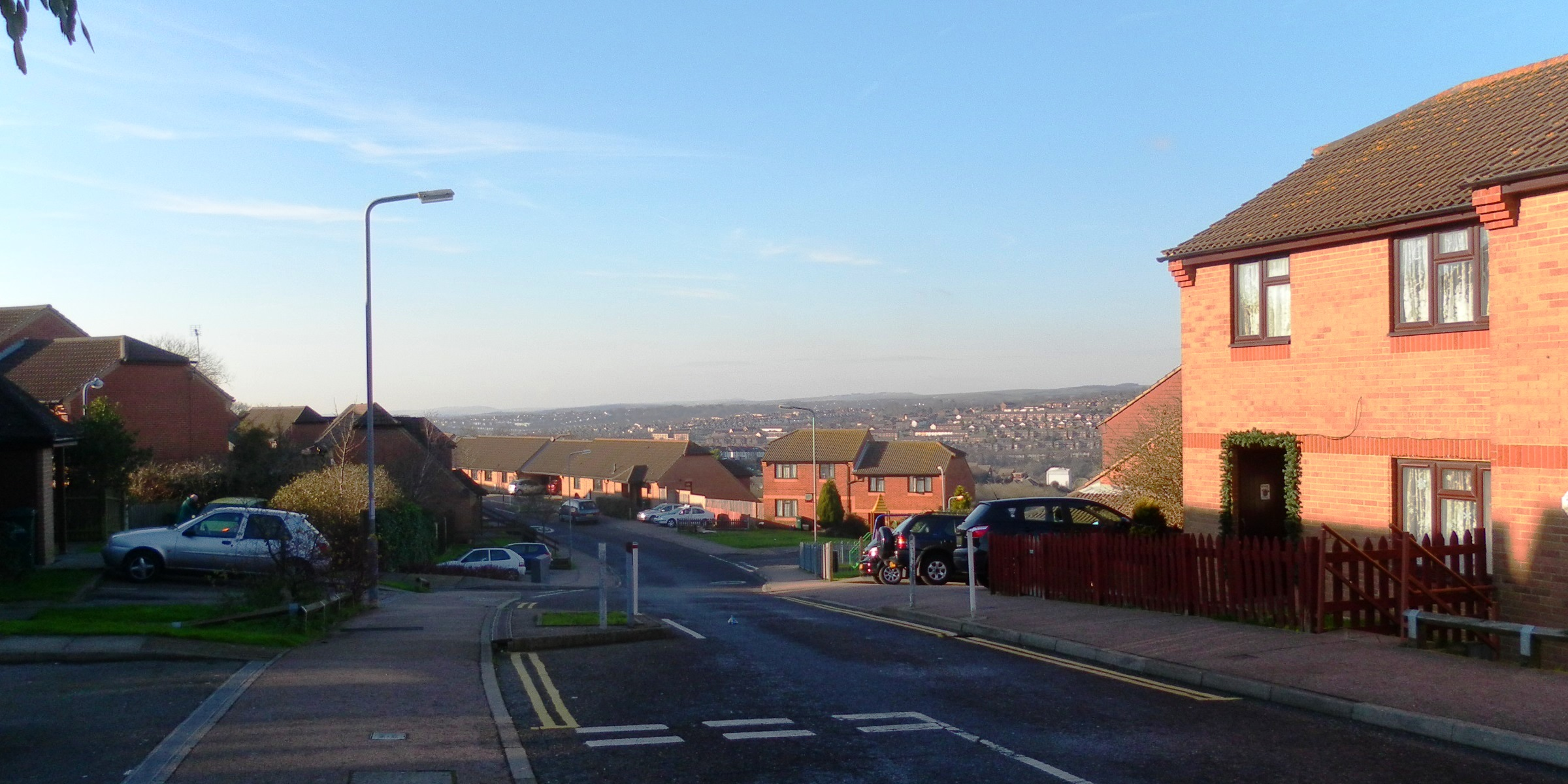
Long views are available from many parts of the Bear Road area, including the Meadowview estate.

The Bear Road area is located on the steep eastern side of the dry valley through which Lewes Road runs. It is made up of two discrete parts on either side of Bear Road, which formed the ancient parish boundary between Brighton and Preston. The area has clearly defined boundaries but no official name, although Brighton and Hove City Council uses the description Bear Road neighbourhood.

The area north of Bear Road is sometimes described as East Preston, because it was the easternmost section of Preston parish. This part developed in the end of the 19th century as a densely populated residential area, and the name Coombe Road area—in reference to another of the main roads—is also used for this part. Meadowview is a late-20th-century housing estate on the northern edge of the area, adjoining Bevendean. The area to the south of Bear Road is covered by two cemeteries. Beyond these are some more terraced residential streets—some of the most densely populated in Brighton—covering the hillside towards Elm Grove (another major west–east road) and the Hanover neighbourhood.

Bear Road has maximum and average gradients of 1:8 and 1:11 respectively, and the other streets running eastwards from Lewes Road are similarly steep. The 141-metre (463 ft) summit of Race Hill is one of the city's highest points, and excellent views are available from there and from the Bear Road area generally. Views westward towards the city centre, northward over the South Downs and southward towards Brighton Racecourse and the sea are particularly important. The cemeteries are sheltered and well planted, but the residential areas to the north are very exposed due to their hillside location and lack of tree cover. The only open space in the area is provided by the allotments at the north end, between the housing and Bevendean; there are no parks or play areas, and the nearest (Saunders Park) is across the Lewes Road.

== History ==
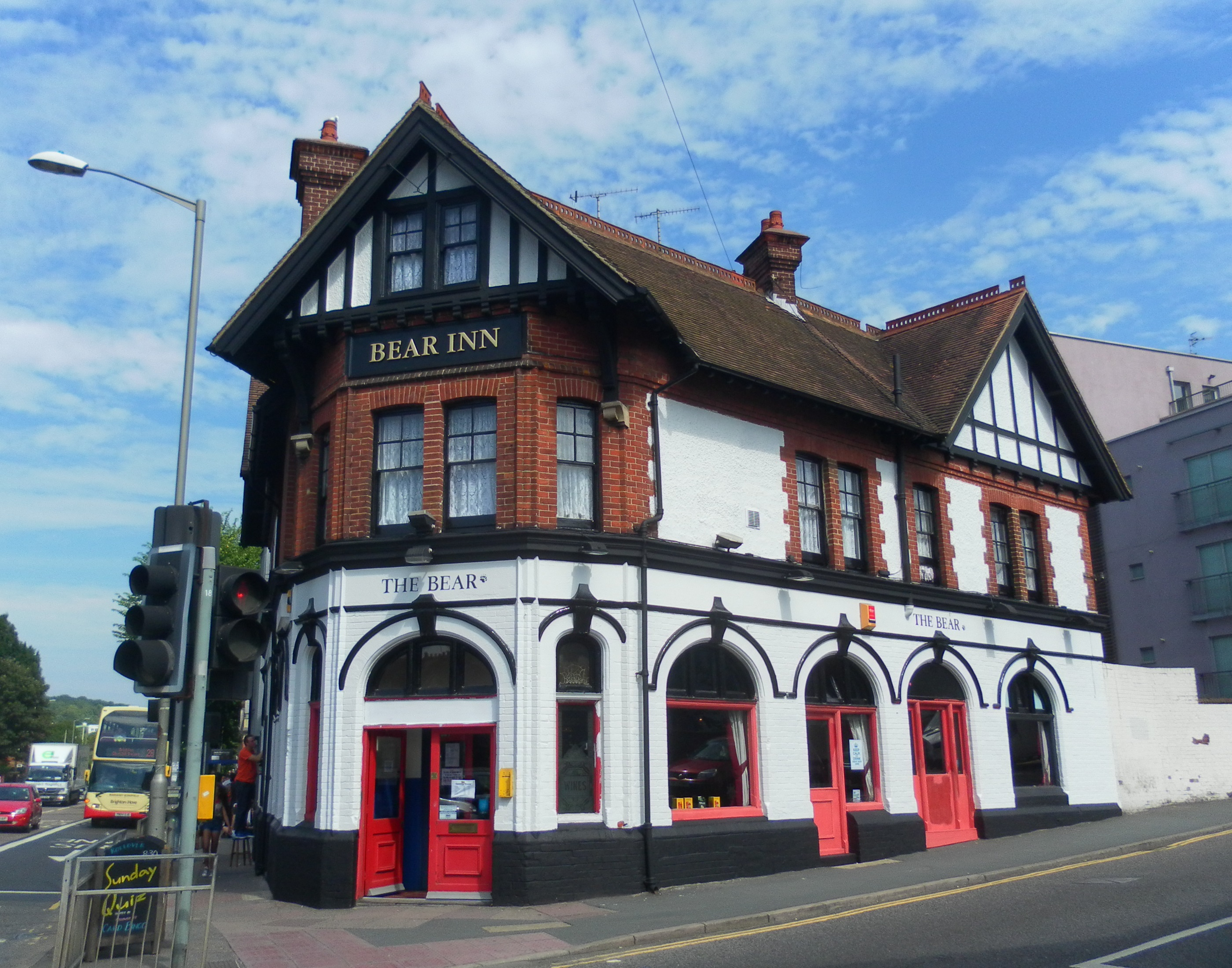
The Bear Inn gave its name to Bear Road.

At the time of the Domesday survey in 1086, the parishes of Patcham and Preston were part of the Hundred of Preston in the Rape of Lewes. The boundaries of the hundred were later changed to cover Preston and Hove parishes, and they remained in this form until 1833 or later. The parish of Preston itself was broadly rectangular, approximately 2 miles (3.2 km) from east to west and 1 mile (1.6 km) north to south, but it "[sent] a long tongue eastwards along the boundary of [Brighton parish] to the summit of the Race Hill". (Note: Race Hill is an area of open hillside next to Brighton Racecourse at the top of Bear Road.) North of this "tongue" of land was the parish of Patcham, which like Preston parish became part of the Borough of Brighton in 1928.

The tithe map of Preston parish before it became urbanised shows most of the northeast part of the parish, including all the land now covered by the Bear Road area, was owned by George Harrington and farmed by Bartholomew Smithers. There were five principal fields, a pond, some farm buildings next to Lewes Road and a windmill. Bear Mill was built in about 1810 and survived until 1903; it stood on the site of number 89 Ladysmith Road. (Note: At 50.837992°N 0.117488°W.) It was a post mill with cloth sails and a white-painted roundhouse. A similar mill, the Race Hill Mill, stood at the top of Bear Road on Race Hill between January 1862 and May 1913, when it collapsed after several years of disuse. Originally known as Park Mill when it stood on Albion Hill, it was moved to its new site over a three-week period in 1861–62. Meanwhile, much of the land south of Bear Road was part of the arable land belonging to Scabe's Castle Farm, whose buildings were on Hartington Road.

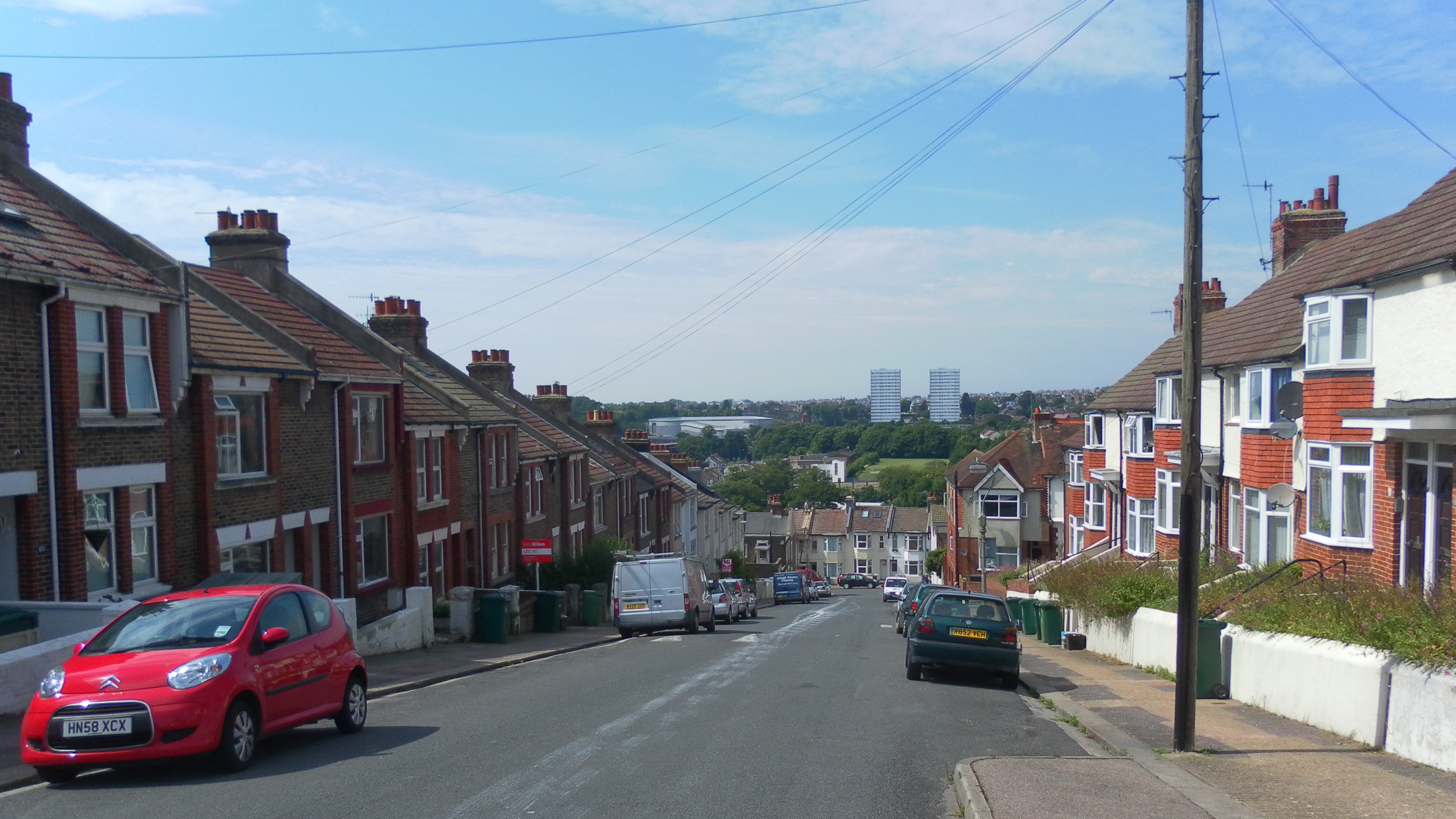
Steep streets, terraced housing and on-street parking characterise the area. This view looks down Ladysmith Road towards Ewhurst Road.

The name of Bear Road comes from the Bear Inn at the foot of the hill, facing the junction with Lewes Road. A pub of that name still occupies the site, but the original building dated from the 18th century and was associated with bear- and badger-baiting at that time. Lewes Road was turnpiked in 1770, but development was slow: the first buildings were the Percy and Wagner Almshouses (1795) south of Elm Grove. Housing reached Bear Road in the 1860s, and in the 1890s and 1900s development spread further north into Preston parish as far as the Patcham parish boundary. At the same time, the steep hillside to the east began to be laid out with working-class housing. Between 1895 and 1899, the north side of Bear Road was lined with houses, and Coombe Terrace became the first new road of housing beyond the two main roads. Between 1900 and 1909, Buller Road, Dewe Road, Ewhurst Road, Ladysmith Road, Nesbitt Road, Redvers Road and Riley Road were laid out in their entirety, and Coombe Road, Milner Road and Natal Road were partly completed. Between 1910 and World War I, Kimberley Road and Mafeking Road were added. Apart from later infill development, the suburb was complete by 1924 with the laying out of Baden Road, Canfield Road, Crayford Road, Eastbourne Road, Carlyle Avenue and the remaining parts of Coombe, Milner and Natal Roads. Canfield Close was built in 1956–59, and the Meadowview area was developed from the 1960s starting with Jevington Drive.

When the area north of Bear Road still consisted of open land, it was a popular site for travelling circuses and fairs. During one fair in the late 19th century, an elephant died and had to be disposed of. A large grave was dug on the hillside and it was buried there. The site was later built over: it is at the junction of the present Natal and Nesbitt Roads (click for image). The fairs ceased when rapid urbanisation started: between 1873 and 1900, the number of houses in the part of Preston parish east of Lewes Road rose from about 450 to more than 4,000.

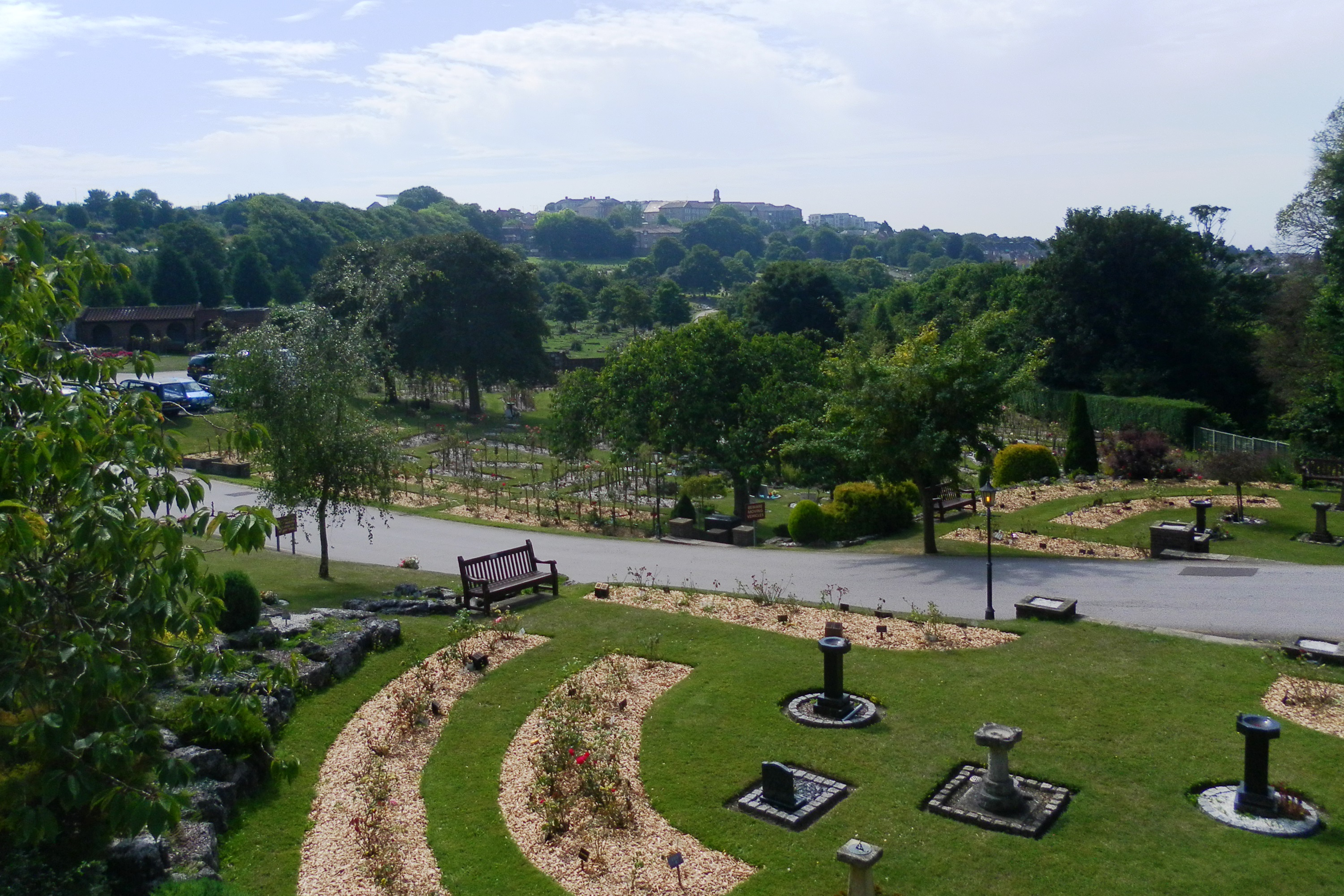
Cemeteries and crematoria occupy much of the land south of Bear Road.

South of Bear Road, about 100 acres (40 ha) of the land formerly belonging to Scabe's Castle Farm is now covered by cemeteries. The Brighton Extra Mural Cemetery is the earliest: it was founded in 1850 by the Brighton Extra Mural Company, which was set up by four eminent Brightonians who were concerned about the lack of burial space in the growing town and the implications for public health. Nonconformist minister John Nelson Goulty, his son the architect Horatio Nelson Goulty, fellow architect Amon Henry Wilds and doctor and politician John Cordy Burrows bought an initial 13 acres (5.3 ha) of land and laid out a private cemetery for Anglican, Roman Catholic and Nonconformist burials. The cemetery now covers 16.5 acres (6.7 ha) and is maintained by Brighton and Hove City Council. In 1857, the Brighton Parochial Cemetery was founded on 20-acre (8.1 ha) of land adjoining the Extra Mural Cemetery; it is now called the Woodvale Cemetery and also has Sussex's first crematorium—the Woodvale Crematorium—which opened in 1930. A third cemetery opened north of Bear Road and opposite the Extra Mural Cemetery in 1868: it covers 31.5 acres (12.7 ha) and is known as City Cemetery or Bear Road Cemetery. In 1886, a fourth cemetery—again privately operated, a status which it still retains—opened on 30 acres (12 ha) of land southeast of the Woodvale Cemetery. It is called the Brighton and Preston Cemetery and also has a crematorium. In 1919, the new Meadowview Jewish Cemetery (replacing a 19th-century facility on Ditchling Road in Round Hill) was laid out on land between the Bear Road Cemetery and the Meadowview estate. The 3.5-acre (1.4 ha) site was extended in 1978 when 1.5 acres (0.61 ha) was added to the northeast.

Bear Road was featured as the final climb on the seventh stage of the 2014 Tour of Britain from Camberley to Brighton.

== Demographics ==
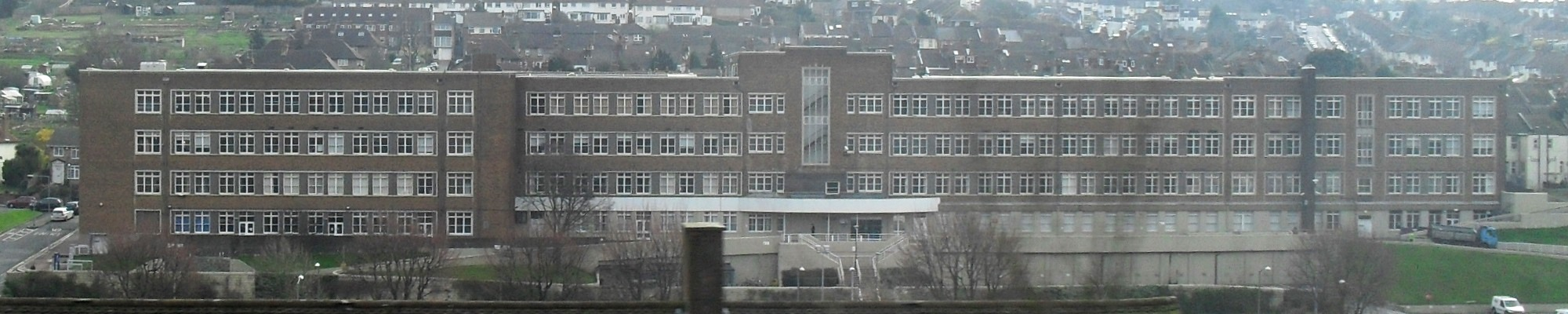
The area is popular with students as it is near two universities (Mithras House, University of Brighton pictured).

At the time of the United Kingdom Census 2001, the Bear Road area's population was estimated at 3,545 and a housing density of 44 dwellings per hectare was calculated. Of the housing stock, 58% is terraced housing, 10% semi-detached, 2% detached and 30% flats of various types. In terms of tenure, in 2001 56% are owned and 44% were rented, mostly from private landlords; this reflects the area's popularity with students, due to its proximity to the city's two universities. The council's demographic classification "student flats and cosmopolitan sharers" accounted for 40% of the housing.

The boundary between the Moulsecoomb & Bevendean ward and the Hanover & Elm Grove ward, two of the 21 local government wards in the city of Brighton and Hove, runs along Bear Road. Two council-supported community action groups cover the area: the Coombe Road Local Action Team and, for Meadowview, the Meadowview and Tenantry Community Action Group. Moulsecoomb & Bevendean ward is represented by three councillors from the Brighton, Hove and District Labour Party.

== Buildings ==
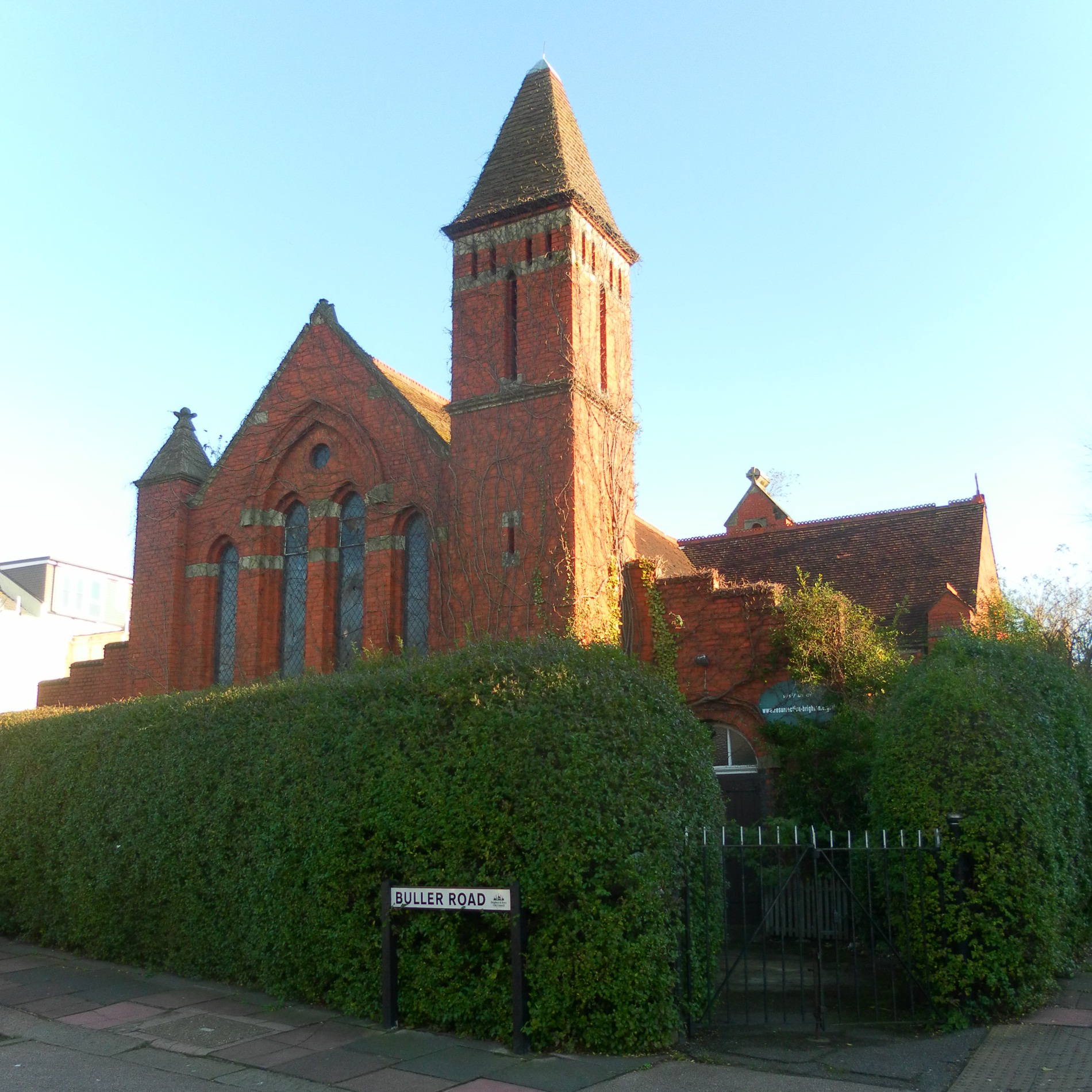
St Alban's Church (pictured in December 2012) was demolished in 2013.

The only church in the area was St Alban's, an Anglican church built between 1910 and 1914 at the junction of Coombe Road and Buller Road. Architect Lacy W. Ridge was responsible for its red-brick Early English Gothic Revival design. It had its own parish until 15 May 1974, when the new Parish of the Resurrection—consisting of St Martin's Church on Lewes Road, St Wilfrid's Church on Elm Grove and St Alban's—was formed. Its deteriorating structural condition led to its closure in 2006, and the Diocese of Chichester declared it redundant on 22 November of that year. Planning permission was granted in 2010 for its demolition and replacement with nine houses. Demolition was authorised in February 2013 and took place later that year. The former parish hall, built in 1902–03 at the corner of Riley Road and Bear Road, still stands. By 1990 it had been acquired by Brighton Polytechnic, and it is now a nursery school. Adjacent to the former church is Coombe Road Primary School, which opened in April 1912 and took infants from 1915. As of 2012 it had 317 pupils between the ages of 4 and 11.

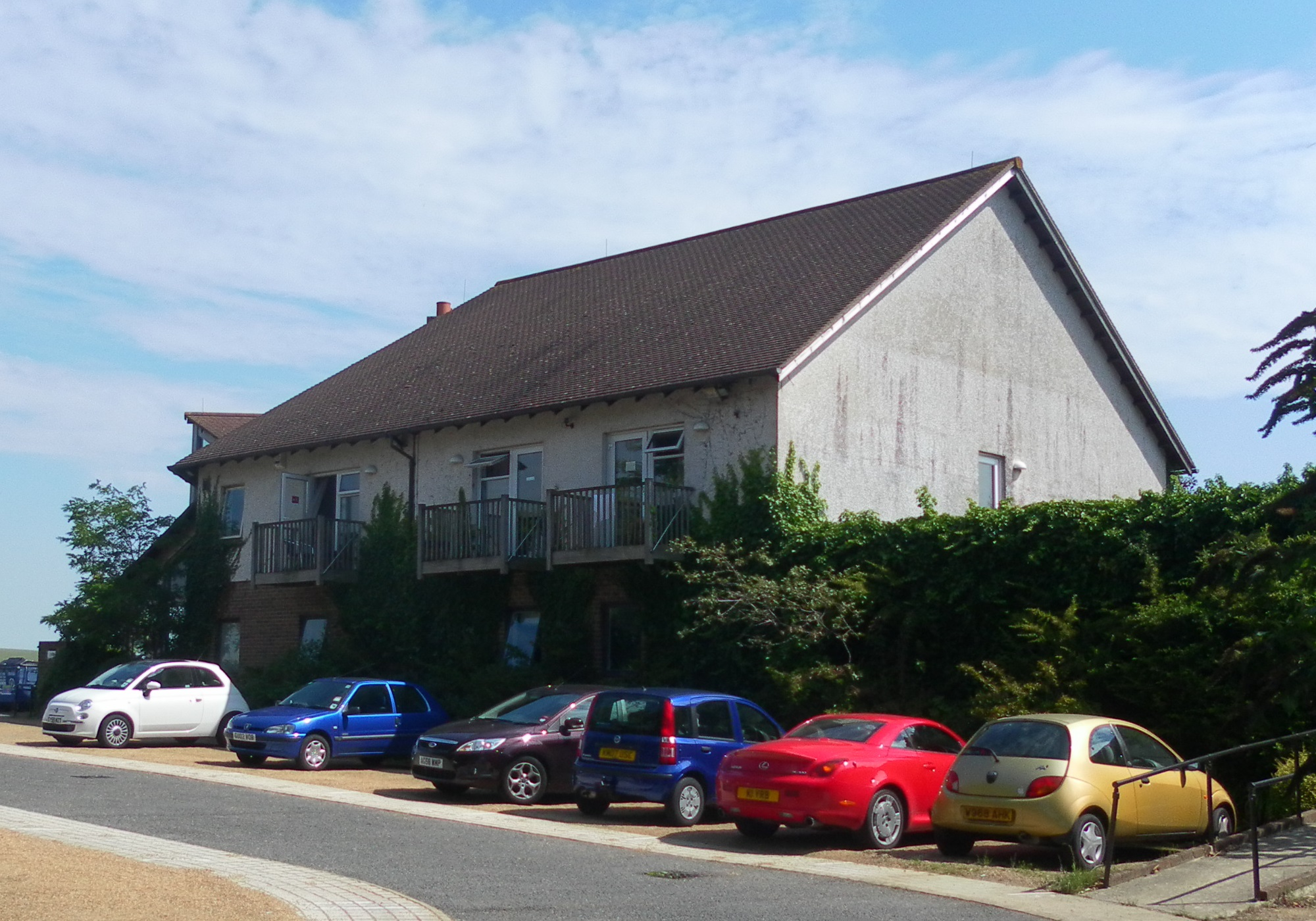
The Sussex Beacon opened in 1992.

Bevendean Hospital—known as Brighton Borough Hospital when it opened in 1881—was originally a sanatorium used to treat patients with contagious diseases. It stood on the east side of Bevendean Road at the top of the hill overlooking the suburb. A smallpox outbreak prompted its construction. Brighton Borough Surveyor designed a permanent building to replace the original wooden huts; the mayor Sir John Blaker opened it on 27 October 1898. Several "pavilions" dedicated to the control of particular diseases were built over the next few years. The hospital passed from local municipal control to national control in 1948 and was renamed Bevendean Hospital. By 1989 it had capacity for 127 patients and cared for elderly and psychiatric patients as well as maintaining its specialism in infectious diseases; but on 24 April 1989 it was closed because of a lack of funding. One ward for day patients stayed open until 26 September 1990, but the site was cleared after that. It is now occupied by new housing (Fitzherbert Drive) and the headquarters of Sussex Beacon. The entrance lodges and red- and white-brick gate piers survive; the latter are Grade II-listed. Bevendean Hospital gained national notoriety in 1950–51 when a girl who was brought there was found to have contracted smallpox. The hospital was quarantined for 34 days; 10 people died, including six hospital workers, although the girl survived.

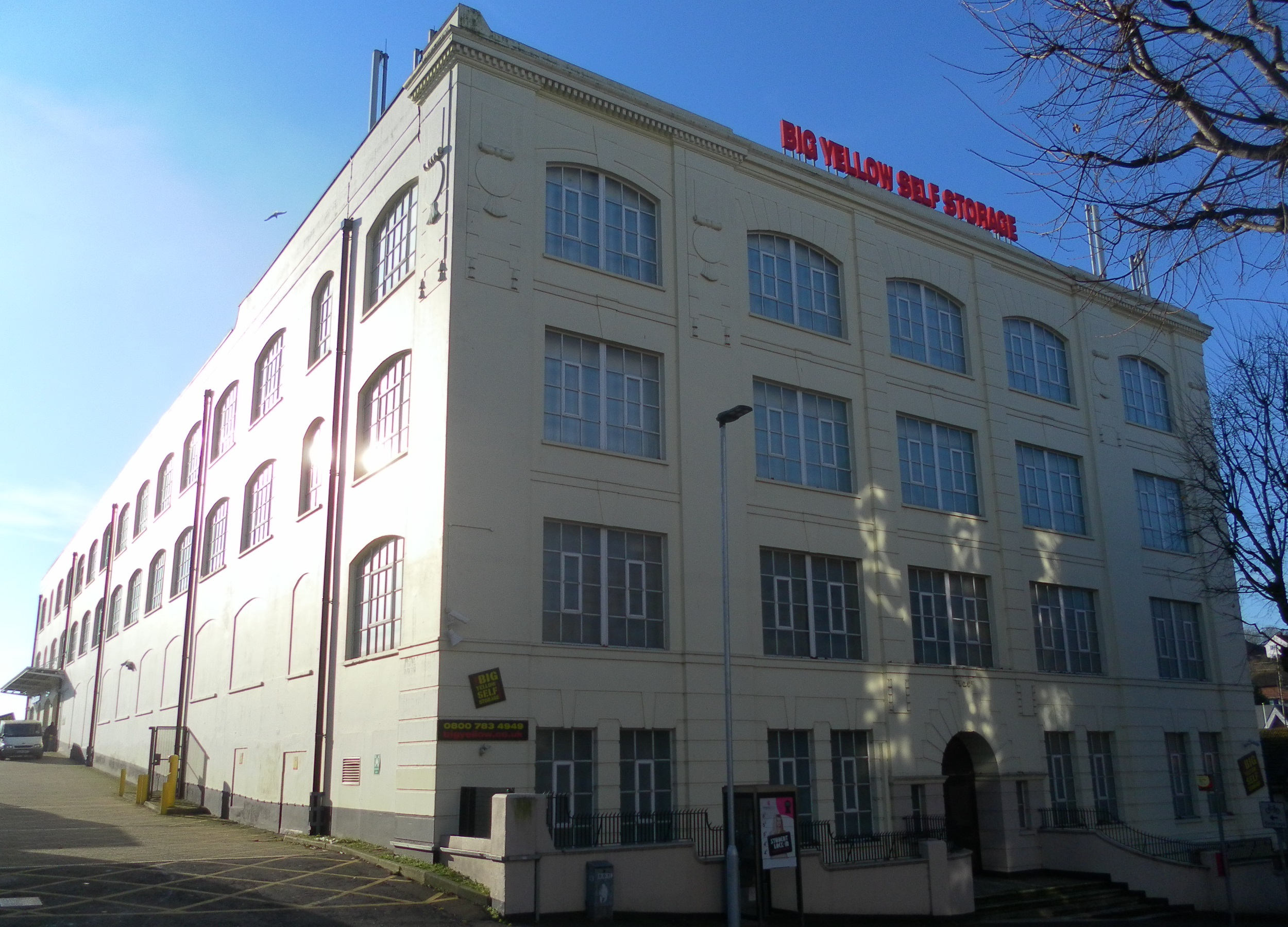
This former diamond factory of 1918 is now a self-storage unit.

Sussex Beacon is the only centre in the county of Sussex specifically intended for the treatment and care of people with HIV/AIDS. It opened in 1992 and offers day care and longer-term treatment: there is a residential unit with 10 beds. In 2009 1,700 people were treated for HIV/AIDS in the city of Brighton and Hove, and the Sussex Beacon forms an important part of the city's HIV/AIDS treatment and care strategy. The Sussex Beacon Half-Marathon, in which thousands of people participate annually, has been central to its fundraising efforts since it opened.

Industrial development started in the early 20th century at the junction of Coombe Road and Lewes Road. Two large factories were built, both of which survive (but not in industrial use). On the north side of Coombe Road, Bernard Oppenheimer's diamond cutting company National Diamond Factories (Bernard Oppenheimer) Ltd built a large works in 1917. Employees included amputee former World War I soldiers. In 1927, it was subdivided into premises for Schweppes and the local electrical engineering company Allen West Ltd, whose works further up Lewes Road had been damaged by a lightning strike. C.V.A. Tools were the next occupants from 1945, but the factory closed in 1973 after a company takeover. In 2000 it was renovated and turned into flats with Art Deco touches. Immediately opposite, on the south side of Coombe Road, another diamond factory was built in 1918. Later, until it closed in 1991, it became the European base of Dentsply, a false teeth manufacturer. Since then it has been occupied by self storage space for the Big Yellow Group. Smaller factories further up Coombe Road belonged to producers of artificial limbs and asbestos, among other products. Allen West expanded further by building a large design and administration office in 1966 on land between Lewes Road and Dewe Road. Contraction in the electrical engineering industry rendered it redundant almost immediately, though: it closed in 1968 and was sold to a property developer in 1972. Five years later it was sold to Brighton Polytechnic (now the University of Brighton) and became Mithras House, one of the institution's main buildings.

== Transport ==
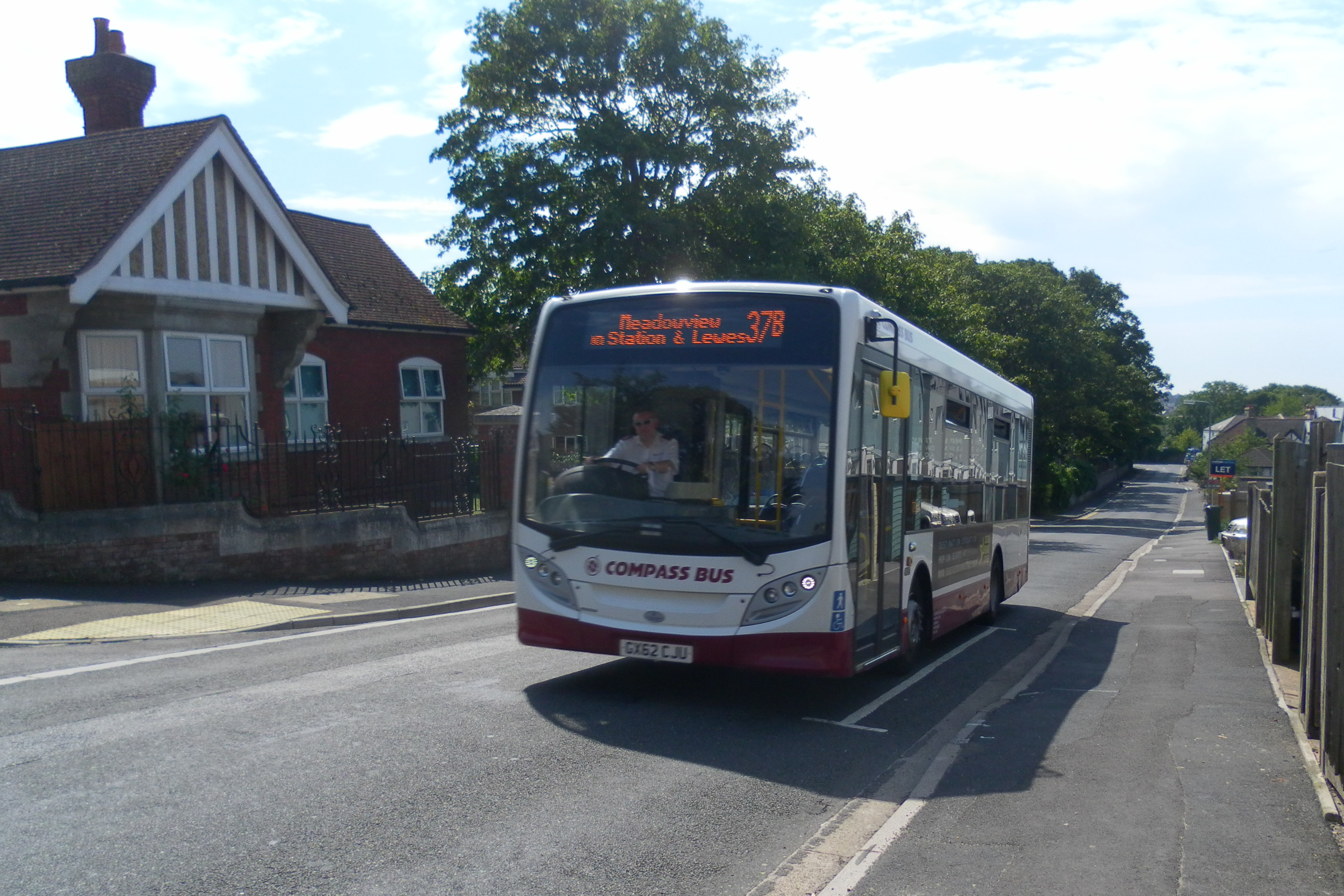
The 37B bus route serves the Bear Road area. This bus is passing the entrance lodges of the former Bevendean Hospital.

The nearest railway station is Moulsecoomb, which is about 10 minutes walk from many of the residential streets. The Compass Bus route 37B from Brighton railway station runs up Bear Road and Bevendean Road to terminate at Meadowview, while Brighton and Hove Buses route 38 starts from Meadowview and run via Coombe Road to Lewes Road, from where it continues in a loop around the New England Quarter to Brighton railway station. Bus journey times to the city centre are about 30 minutes. Heavy traffic along Lewes Road and Bear Road contrasts with the quieter environment of the terraced streets coming off them, but there is much on-street car parking as most houses lack their own off-street facilities.

== See also ==
- Cemeteries and crematoria in Brighton and Hove
- List of demolished places of worship in Brighton and Hove
- Media related to Bear Road area, Brighton at Wikimedia Commons

== Bibliography ==
- Antram, Nicholas; Morrice, Richard (2008). Brighton and Hove. Pevsner Architectural Guides. London: Yale University Press. ISBN 978-0-300-12661-7.
- Carder, Timothy (1990). The Encyclopaedia of Brighton. Lewes: East Sussex County Libraries. ISBN 0-861-47315-9.
- Collis, Rose (2010). The New Encyclopaedia of Brighton. (based on the original by Tim Carder) (1st ed.). Brighton: Brighton & Hove Libraries. ISBN 978-0-9564664-0-2.
- Dale, Antony (1991). Brighton Cemeteries. Brighton: Brighton Borough Council.
- Gilbert, Edmund M. (1975) [1954]. Brighton: Old Ocean's Bauble. Hassocks: Flare Books. ISBN 0-901759-39-2.
- Horlock, Christopher (2010). Bizarre Brighton. Seaford: S.B. Publications. ISBN 978-1-85770-351-1.
- Preston Village Millennium Project (2004). Preston: Downland Village to Brighton Suburb. Brighton: Brighton Books Publishing. ISBN 1-901454-07-X.
