= West Hill, Brighton =

Area of Brighton, East Sussex, England

Coordinates: 50°49′46.82″N 0°8′42.62″W

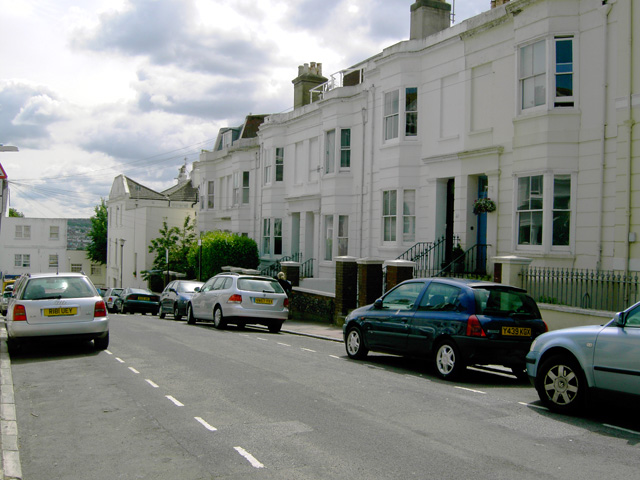
West Hill Road — the houses are typical of the area

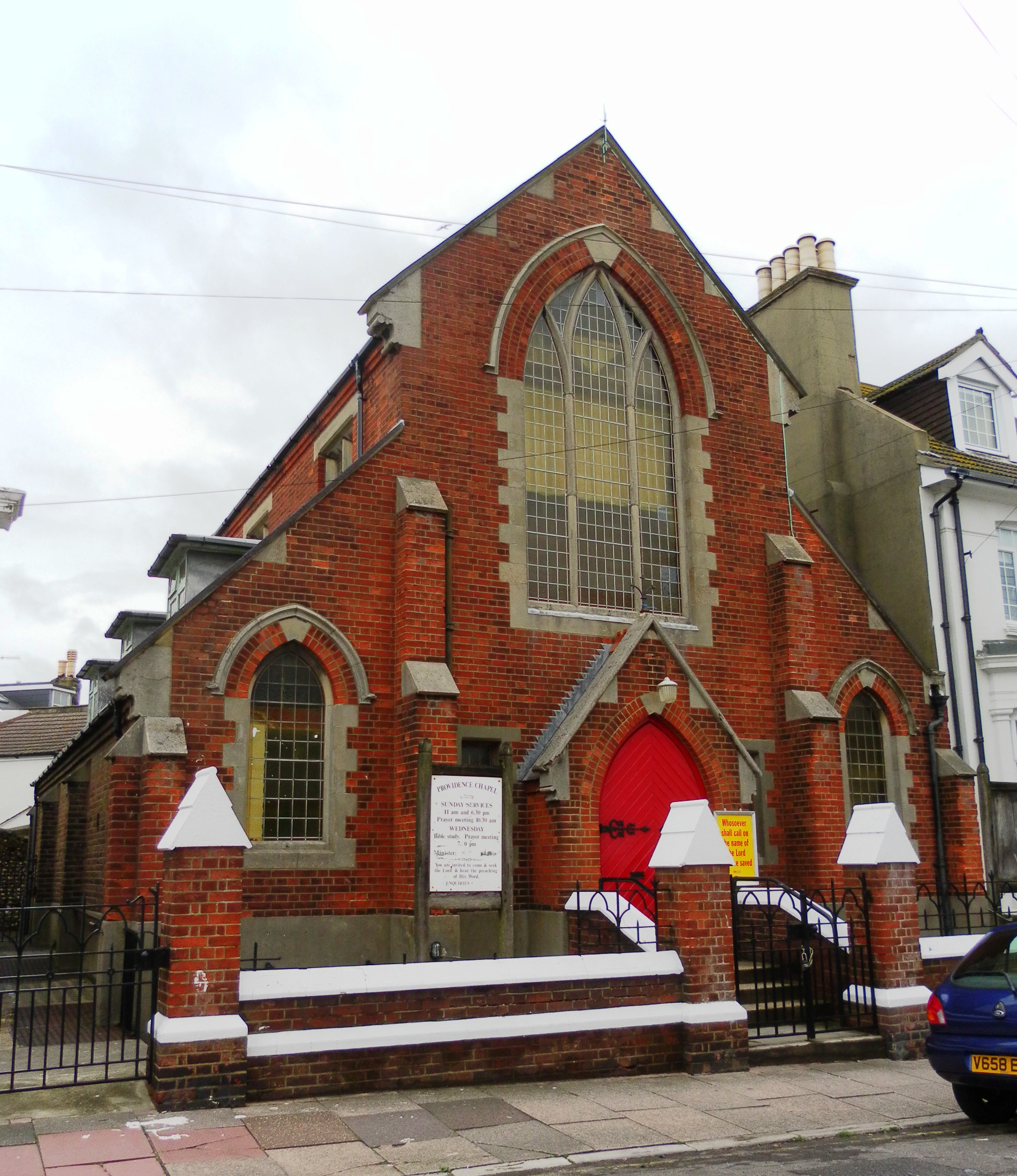
Providence Chapel, West Hill Road, West Hill, Brighton

West Hill is an area of Brighton and Hove, East Sussex situated on the east-facing hill rising west from Brighton railway station towards Seven Dials. The area is bounded by Dyke Road to the west, by the curve of the railway line and the station to the north and east, and by modern development along Queen's Road (with the North Laine area beyond) to the south-east.

The area is mainly residential consisting of late 19th century housing of varying types: small terraced houses in the east of the area close to the station, and larger semi-detached villa-style properties to the west.

West Hill was designated a conservation area in 1977 and comprises approximately 56 acres (230,000 m^{2}).

Brighton railway station is in the West Hill area. It is a Grade II* listed building—one of 70 in the city of Brighton and Hove (as of February 2001).

The West Hill Community Association is active in the West Hill area of Brighton and is based in West Hill Hall in Compton Avenue. Since the 1970s, it produces a community magazine 6 times a year called The Whistler.
