= Grade II listed buildings in Brighton and Hove: T–V =

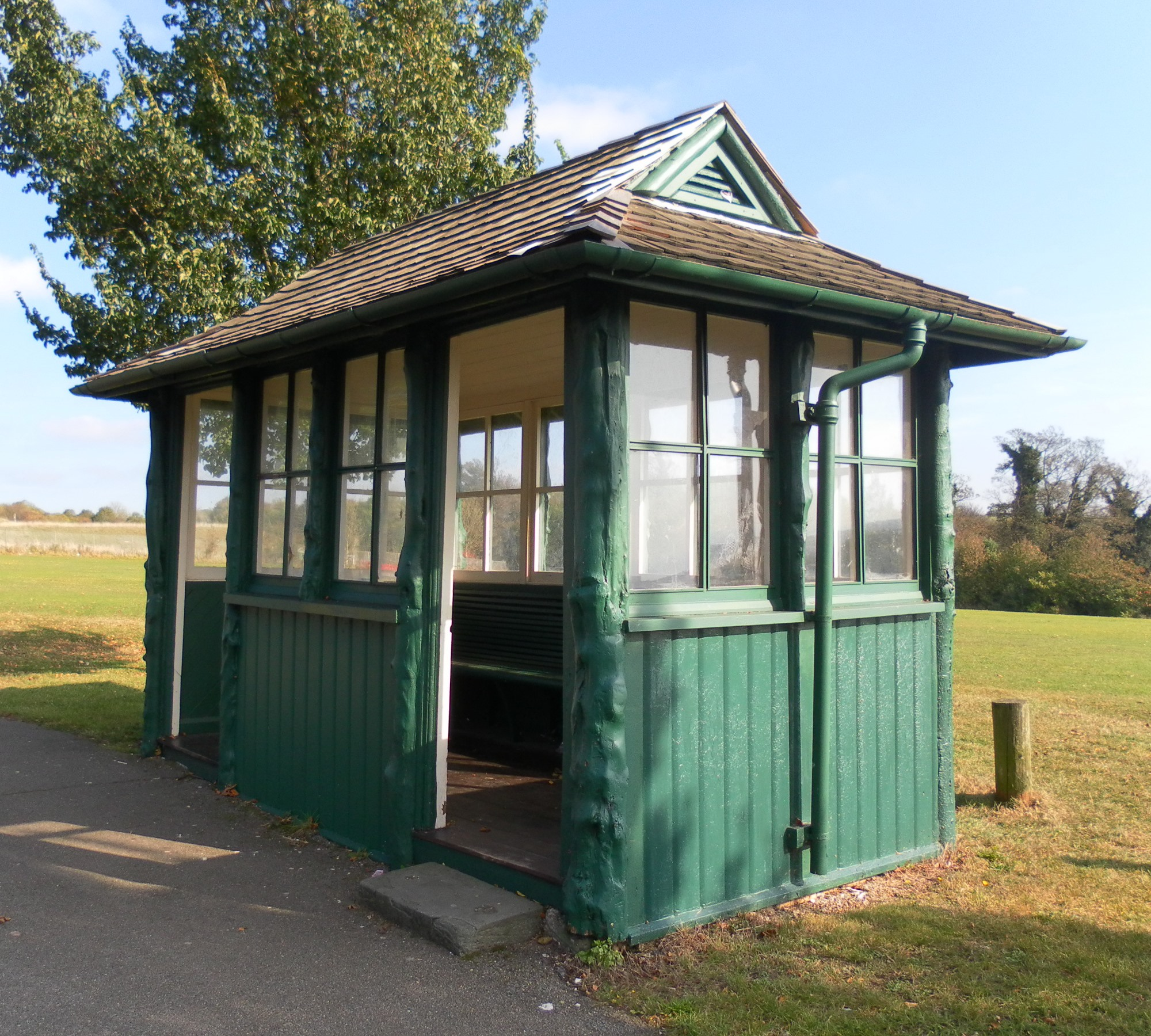
This rustic tram shelter, composed of timber, plywood, slate and "unusually gnarled sections of tree-trunks", was built in the early 20th century by Brighton Corporation Tramways at the junction of Ditchling and Surrenden Roads.

As of February 2001, there were 1,124 listed buildings with Grade II status in the English city of Brighton and Hove. The total at 2009 was similar. The city, on the English Channel coast approximately 52 miles (84 km) south of London, was formed as a unitary authority in 1997 by the merger of the neighbouring towns of Brighton and Hove. Queen Elizabeth II granted city status in 2000.

In England, a building or structure is defined as "listed" when it is placed on a statutory register of buildings of "special architectural or historic interest" by the Secretary of State for Culture, Media and Sport, a Government department, in accordance with the Planning (Listed Buildings and Conservation Areas) Act 1990. English Heritage, a non-departmental public body, acts as an agency of this department to administer the process and advise the department on relevant issues. There are three grades of listing status. The Grade II designation is the lowest, and is used for "nationally important buildings of special interest". Grade II* is used for "particularly important buildings of more than special interest"; there are 69 such buildings in the city. There are also 24 Grade I listed buildings (defined as being of "exceptional interest" and greater than national importance, and the highest of the three grades) in Brighton and Hove.

This list summarises 96 Grade II-listed buildings and structures whose names begin with T, U or V. Numbered buildings with no individual name are listed by the name of the street they stand on. Some listings include contributory fixtures such as surrounding walls or railings in front of the building. These are summarised by notes alongside the building name.

== Listed buildings ==
Contributory fixtures
Note	Listing includes
^{[A]}	Attached piers
^{[B]}	Attached piers and balustrades
^{[C]}	Attached piers and railings
^{[D]}	Attached railings
^{[E]}	Attached walls
^{[F]}	Attached walls and piers
^{[G]}	Attached walls and railings
^{[H]}	Attached walls, piers and railings
^{[I]}	Attached walls, railings and porch

Building name	Area	Image	Notes	Refs
Temple and wall at former Attree Villa	Queen's Park; 50.8263°N 0.1239°W		.	
2 Temple Street	Brighton; 50.8253°N 0.1536°W		.	
3–5 Temple Street	Brighton; 50.8254°N 0.1536°W		.	
29 Temple Street	Brighton; 50.8260°N 0.1529°W		.	
31 Temple Street	Brighton; 50.8259°N 0.1530°W		.	
37 Temple Street	Brighton; 50.8257°N 0.1531°W		.	
42 Temple Street	Brighton; 50.8255°N 0.1532°W		.	
12 Terminus Road	West Hill; 50.8294°N 0.1418°W		.	
20–23 Terminus Road	West Hill; 50.8299°N 0.1419°W		.	
The Colonnade	Brighton; 50.8192°N 0.1323°W		.	
The Dene^{[E]}	Rottingdean; 50.8062°N 0.0587°W		.	
51 and 53 The Drive	Hove; 50.8305°N 0.1682°W		.	
52 and 54 The Drive	Hove; 50.8305°N 0.1673°W		.	
55 The Drive	Hove; 50.8307°N 0.1682°W		.	
56 The Drive	Hove; 50.8308°N 0.1672°W		.	
57 The Drive	Hove; 50.8309°N 0.1681°W		.	
58 The Drive	Hove; 50.8309°N 0.1672°W		.	
59 The Drive	Hove; 50.8311°N 0.1681°W		.	
60 The Drive^{[E]}	Hove; 50.8311°N 0.1672°W		.	
63 and 65 The Drive^{[F]}	Hove; 50.8314°N 0.1680°W		.	
67 The Drive	Hove; 50.8316°N 0.1679°W		.	
69 The Drive^{[A]}	Hove; 50.8317°N 0.1678°W		.	
71 The Drive^{[A]}	Hove; 50.8318°N 0.1678°W		.	
73 The Drive	Hove; 50.8320°N 0.1678°W		.	
75 The Drive	Hove; 50.8321°N 0.1678°W		.	
77 The Drive^{[C]}	Hove; 50.8322°N 0.1677°W		.	
79 The Drive	Hove; 50.8324°N 0.1677°W		.	
The Elms	Rottingdean; 50.8068°N 0.0584°W		.	
The Gables^{[H]}	Hove; 50.8282°N 0.1687°W		.	
The Grange^{[F]} (More images)	Rottingdean; 50.8059°N 0.0573°W		.	
8 and 9 The Square	Patcham; 50.8645°N 0.1516°W		.	
10–12 The Square	Patcham; 50.8646°N 0.1515°W		.	
13–18 The Square	Patcham; 50.8647°N 0.1514°W		.	
19 and 20 The Square	Patcham; 50.8648°N 0.1516°W		.	
The Temple at The Esplanade	Kemp Town; 50.8144°N 0.1085°W		.	
The Timbers	Rottingdean; 50.8068°N 0.0598°W		.	
2 Third Avenue^{[F]}	Hove; 50.8253°N 0.1711°W		.	
4 Third Avenue	Hove; 50.8255°N 0.1711°W		.	
6 Third Avenue	Hove; 50.8257°N 0.1710°W		.	
35 Third Avenue	Hove; 50.8272°N 0.1699°W		.	
1 Tilbury Place^{[I]}	Carlton Hill; 50.8240°N 0.1320°W		.	
2–5 Tilbury Place^{[D]}	Carlton Hill; 50.8242°N 0.1319°W		.	
63 Tisbury Road	Hove; 50.8303°N 0.1694°W		.	
Tomb of John Frederick Ginnett at Woodvale Cemetery	Brighton; 50.8360°N 0.1164°W		.	
Tombs at All Saints Church	Patcham; 50.8665°N 0.1504°W		.	
Tombs at St Margaret's Church	Rottingdean; 50.8067°N 0.0571°W		.	
Tombs at St Peter's Church	Preston Village; 50.8422°N 0.1494°W		.	
Tower at Tarner Recreation Ground^{[E]}	Carlton Hill; 50.8247°N 0.1310°W		.	
Tower House (More images)	Withdean; 50.8472°N 0.1532°W		In 1902, newly retired royal jeweller James John Savage bought a large plot of land in Withdean and commissioned architects George Burstow & Sons to design a house for himself and his family and servants. The 12-bedroom house was designed with a lookout tower at Savage's request. It was still in private ownership until 1988, but was then acquired by the council and converted into flats and a daycare centre. "Imposing and richly detailed", the Edwardian/Queen Anne Revival-style brick building is "Brighton's finest example of a grand Edwardian-era house".	
96 Trafalgar Street	North Laine; 50.8282°N 0.1369°W		.	
Tram shelter at Ditchling Road (More images)	Hollingdean; 50.8530°N 0.1347°W		.	
Tram shelter at Queen's Park Road (More images)	Queen's Park; 50.8274°N 0.1251°W		.	
Tram shelters at Pavilion Parade (More images)	Brighton; 50.8218°N 0.1372°W		.	
1–9 and 16–29 Tudor Close	Rottingdean; 50.8070°N 0.0565°W		.	
Tunnel entrance and embankments at The Esplanade	Kemp Town; 50.8154°N 0.1114°W		.	
Tythe Barn	Ovingdean; 50.8161°N 0.0768°W		.	
Union Chapel (former)^{[D]} (More images)	The Lanes; 50.8222°N 0.1410°W		.	
1–5 Union Street	The Lanes; 50.8222°N 0.1413°W		.	
9 and 10 Union Street	The Lanes; 50.8223°N 0.1414°W		.	
2–9 Upper Market Street	Hove; 50.8251°N 0.1574°W		.	
42 and 43 Upper North Street	Brighton; 50.8252°N 0.1479°W		.	
44 Upper North Street	Brighton; 50.8253°N 0.1481°W		.	
45 Upper North Street	Brighton; 50.8253°N 0.1482°W		.	
47 and 48 Upper North Street	Brighton; 50.8253°N 0.1483°W		.	
64 Upper North Street^{[F]}	Brighton; 50.8257°N 0.1494°W		.	
77–89 Upper North Street^{[F]}	Brighton; 50.8254°N 0.1476°W		.	
3 Upper Rock Gardens^{[D]}	Kemptown; 50.8205°N 0.1303°W		.	
15 Upper Rock Gardens^{[D]}	Kemptown; 50.8210°N 0.1301°W		.	
17 Upper Rock Gardens^{[G]}	Kemptown; 50.8212°N 0.1301°W		.	
18 Upper Rock Gardens^{[D]}	Kemptown; 50.8212°N 0.1300°W		.	
20 Upper Rock Gardens^{[D]}	Kemptown; 50.8213°N 0.1299°W		.	
21 Upper Rock Gardens^{[D]}	Kemptown; 50.8214°N 0.1300°W		.	
22 Upper Rock Gardens^{[D]}	Kemptown; 50.8214°N 0.1299°W		.	
23–26 Upper Rock Gardens^{[D]}	Kemptown; 50.8215°N 0.1298°W		.	
73, 73a and 73b Upper St James's Street^{[D]}	Kemptown; 50.8201°N 0.1300°W		.	
1–6 Vernon Terrace^{[D]}	Montpelier; 50.8292°N 0.1502°W		.	
7–16 Vernon Terrace^{[B]}	Montpelier; 50.8296°N 0.1496°W		.	
37 Vernon Terrace^{[F]}	Montpelier; 50.8307°N 0.1480°W		.	
1 and 2 Vicarage Lane	Rottingdean; 50.8055°N 0.0579°W		.	
1–3 Vicarage Terrace	Rottingdean; 50.8056°N 0.0574°W		.	
4 Vicarage Terrace	Rottingdean; 50.8055°N 0.0574°W		.	
5 and 6 Vicarage Terrace	Rottingdean; 50.8054°N 0.0576°W		.	
Victoria Fountain (More images)	Brighton; 50.8208°N 0.1373°W		.	
1–10 Victoria Grove	Hove; 50.8270°N 0.1673°W		.	
1 Victoria Place^{[D]}	Montpelier; 50.8264°N 0.1496°W		.	
7 Victoria Road	Montpelier; 50.8268°N 0.1488°W		.	
14 and 15 Victoria Road^{[H]}	Montpelier; 50.8271°N 0.1488°W		.	
12 Victoria Street^{[F]}	Montpelier; 50.8264°N 0.1494°W		.	
13 and 14 Victoria Street^{[F]}	Montpelier; 50.8265°N 0.1493°W		.	
16 and 17 Victoria Street^{[F]}	Montpelier; 50.8267°N 0.1492°W		.	
19 Victoria Street^{[F]}	Montpelier; 50.8268°N 0.1491°W		.	
21 and 22 Victoria Street^{[F]}	Montpelier; 50.8269°N 0.1491°W		.	
23–25 Victoria Street^{[F]}	Montpelier; 50.8268°N 0.1488°W		.	
30 Victoria Street^{[F]}	Montpelier; 50.8265°N 0.1489°W		.	
Victoria Terrace	Hove; 50.8250°N 0.1757°W		.	
Victory Inn (More images)	The Lanes; 50.8226°N 0.1425°W		.	

== See also ==
- Buildings and architecture of Brighton and Hove
- Grade I listed buildings in Brighton and Hove
- Grade II* listed buildings in Brighton and Hove
- List of conservation areas in Brighton and Hove
