= Montpelier Crescent =

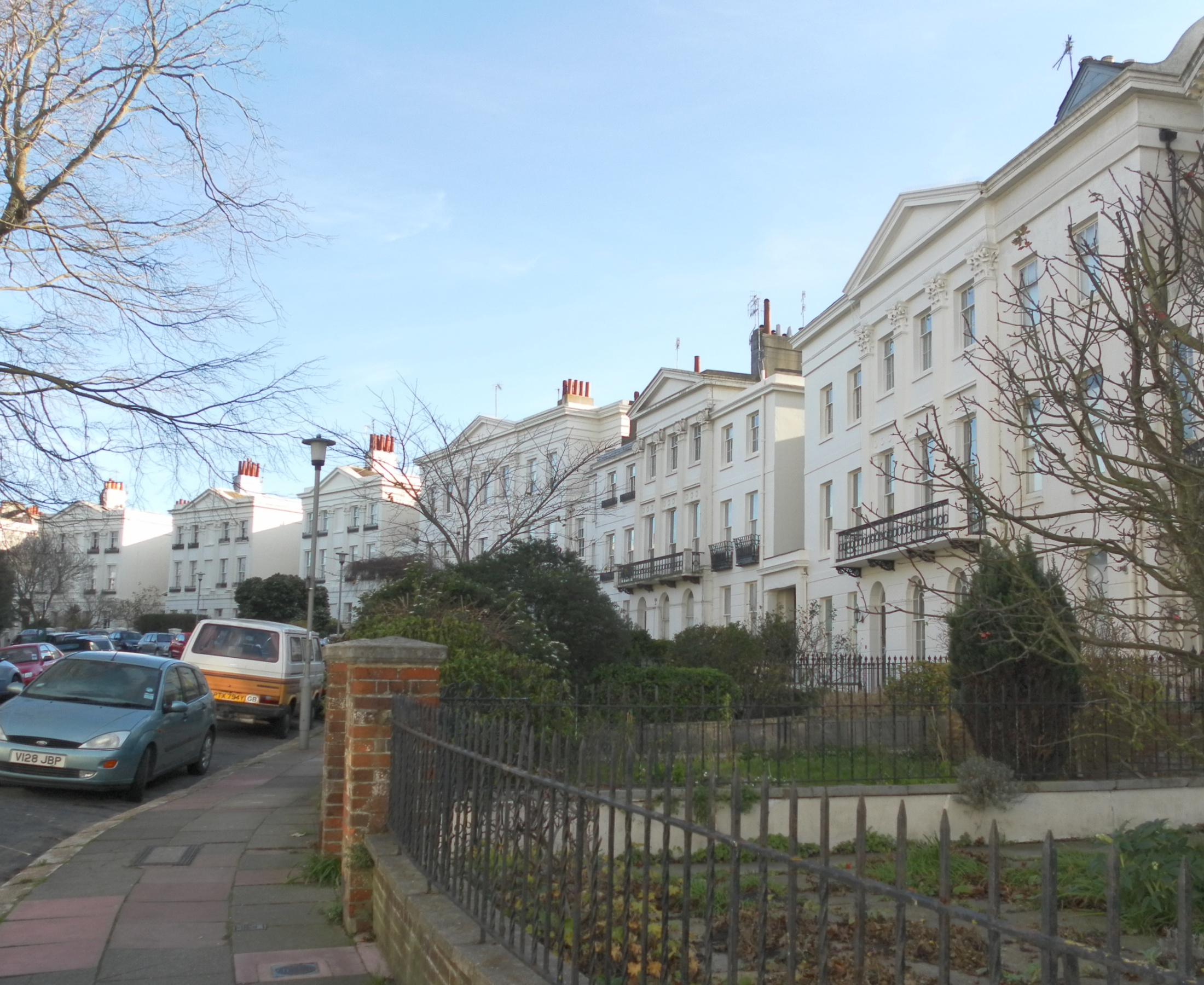
- The central section of Montpelier Crescent seen from the south-southwest

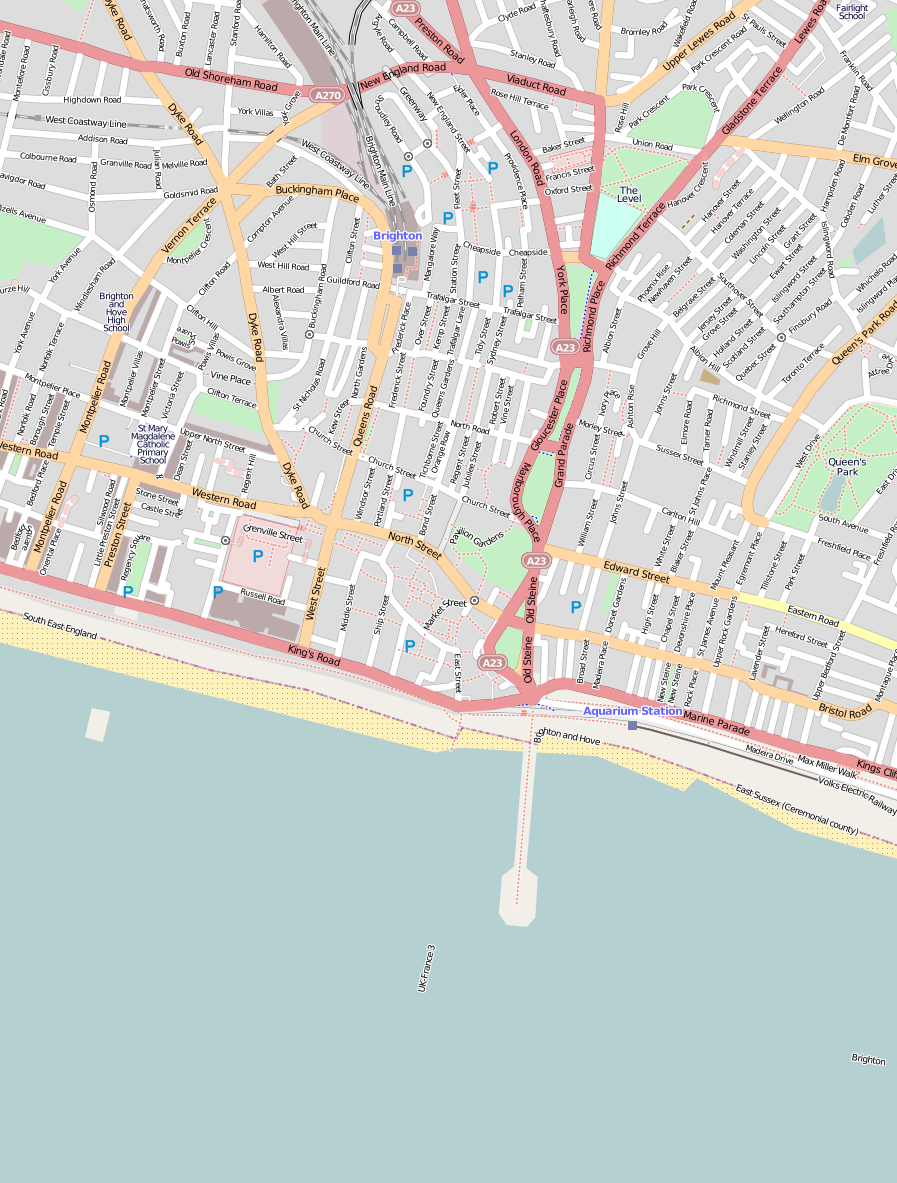
- Location of Montpelier Crescent within central Brighton
- 50.8294°N 0.1480°W
- Location: Montpelier Crescent, Montpelier, Brighton, Brighton and Hove, East Sussex, United Kingdom

History
- Built: 1843–47; c. 1855

Site notes
- Architect: Amon Henry Wilds
- Architectural style: Regency

Listed Building – Grade II*
- Official name: Numbers 7–31 Montpelier Crescent and attached gate piers, walls and railings
- Designated: 13 October 1952
- Reference no.: 1380362

Listed Building – Grade II
- Official name: Numbers 1, 2 and 3 Montpelier Crescent and attached railings; Numbers 4, 5 and 6 Montpelier Crescent and attached railings; 32 and 33 Montpelier Crescent; 34–38 Montpelier Crescent
- Designated: 20 August 1971
- Reference no.: 1380360; 1380361; 1380363; 1380364

Montpelier Crescent is a mid 19th-century crescent of 38 houses in the Montpelier suburb of the English coastal city of Brighton and Hove. Built in five parts as a set-piece residential development in the rapidly growing seaside resort, the main part of the crescent was designed between 1843 and 1847 by prominent local architect Amon Henry Wilds and is one of his most distinctive compositions. Extra houses were added at both ends of the crescent in the mid-1850s. Unlike most other squares, terraces and crescents in Brighton, it does not face the sea—and the view it originally had towards the South Downs was blocked within a few years by a tall terrace of houses opposite. Montpelier was an exclusive and "salubrious" area of Brighton, and Montpelier Crescent has been called its "great showpiece". Wilds's central section has been protected as Grade II* listed, with the later additions listed separately at the lower Grade II. The crescent is in one of the city's 34 conservation areas, and forms one of several "outstanding examples of late Regency architecture" within it.

== History ==
Brighton (originally known as Brighthelmston) developed as a large fishing and agricultural village on the English Channel coast. Despite intermittent periods of decline and destitution, it was the largest town in the county of Sussex by 1600. In the mid-18th century, the damaging economic effects of a terminal decline in the fishing industry were reversed by the new fashion for sea-bathing, and the town's new role as a seaside resort began. Northwest of the old town, around the parish church and the road leading to Devil's Dyke and on to London, was an expanse of gently sloping downland known as Church Hill. It was given over to sheep-grazing and was owned by two prominent locals: MP Thomas Kemp and John Sackville, 3rd Duke of Dorset.

Helped by royal patronage (particularly from the Prince Regent) and good transport links to London and other important towns, Brighton grew rapidly in the early 19th century, and high-class suburbs were laid out. The completion in 1841 of the main railway line from London provided a further stimulus. By this time, Church Hill—ideally situated close to the sea and the town's main attractions, largely undeveloped and with a pleasant southwesterly aspect—was developing as a high-class residential area called Montpelier. Montpelier Road was laid out from 1820 as a major road running from the seafront to the Ditchling Road, past the house built in 1819 for the late Thomas Kemp's son Thomas Read Kemp. Prominent local architect Amon Henry Wilds is believed to have designed it, although his father Amon Wilds may have been involved.

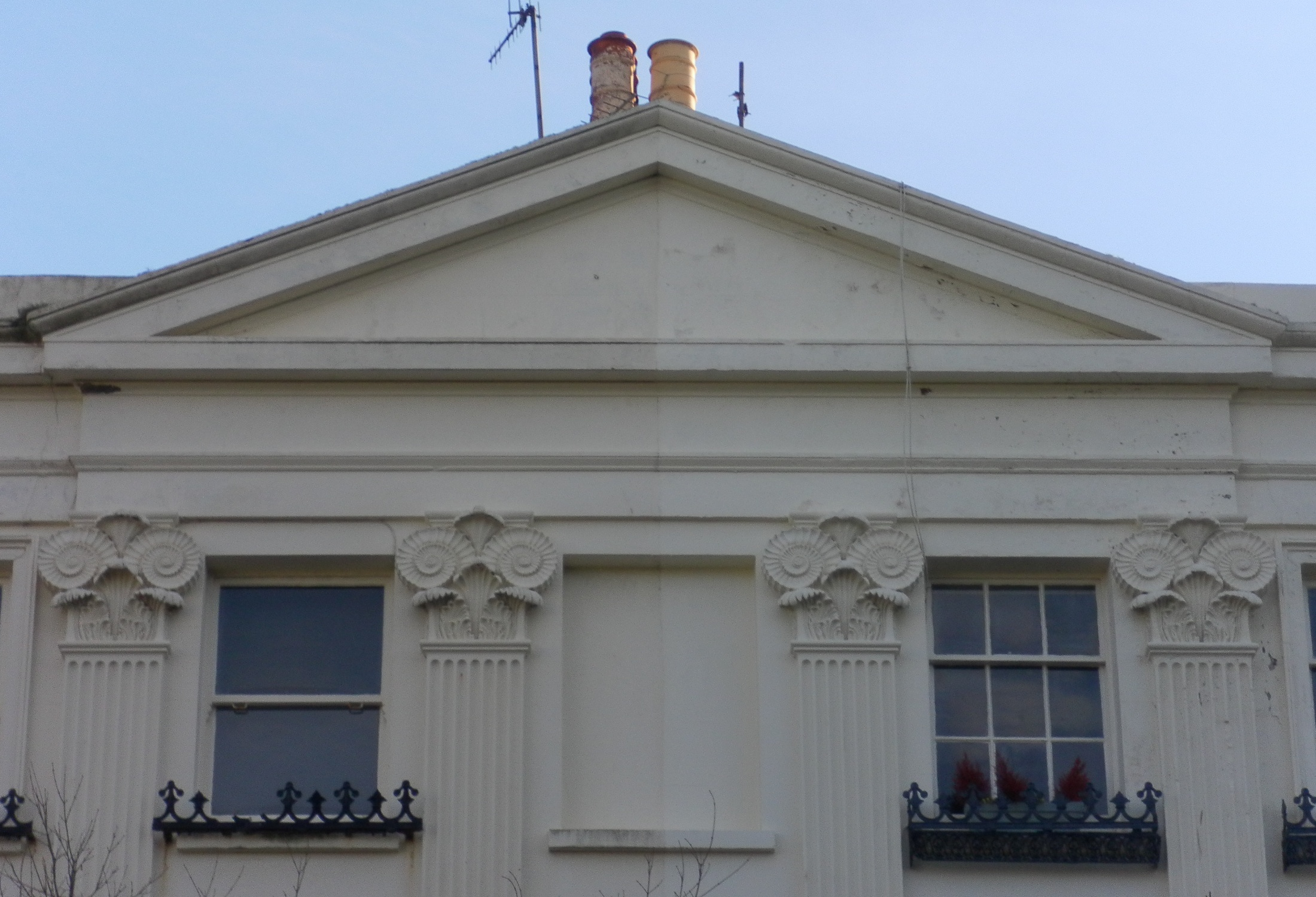
Some of the crescent's houses were decorated with ammonite capitals.

Thomas Read Kemp's finances were overstretched by his involvement with the Kemp Town estate east of Brighton, and by the time he fled to France in 1837 he had sold or given away most of his landholding in the Montpelier area. Parcels of land were bought by builders and speculators, and a series of carefully planned "set-piece" residential developments were laid out. Work on Montpelier Crescent started in 1843, on and behind a stretch of Kemp's land previously occupied by a cricket pitch. The Lillywhite's Ground (also known as the Temple Fields Ground) was in use between 1831 and 1844 and was one of Brighton Cricket Club's venues. Amon Henry Wilds was commissioned to design the first set of houses; in view of the vast scale he worked to, which was unusual on a site so far inland from the coast, the crescent has been called "the grandest of his many works". The houses lacked a sea view, as they faced northwest towards the open land of the South Downs. The crescent was completed in 1847; within ten years, the downland vista had been obscured by the construction of Vernon Terrace opposite. This "impressive" set of four-storey terraced houses, dating from between 1856 and the mid-1860s, lined the west side of the former Montpelier Road, which by this stage had been renamed except for the stretch south of Denmark Villas. Between the east side of Vernon Terrace and the crescent, a curved area of green space was retained.

The section completed in 1847, consisting of paired and tripartite groups of linked villas (a unique arrangement within Brighton), comprised house numbers 7 to 31 inclusive. (Note: Present numbering scheme.) Two wings flanking the original crescent were added in the mid-1850s, taking the number of houses to 38. They had a different, slightly less elaborate design: for example, they lacked the tall Classical-style pilasters and Wilds's characteristic ammonite capitals, as seen on the earlier houses. All houses were comparatively plain inside: features included characteristic Victorian decorative mouldings and wooden staircases.

The crescent has changed little since its construction, although some buildings at the north end (adjacent to the present number 1) were demolished in the late 19th century to allow Seven Dials, a major road junction, to be built. The buildings are shown in a steel engraving dated approximately 1856, which also suggests that the crescent was closed at one end with railings which also continued around the gardens.

== Heritage ==
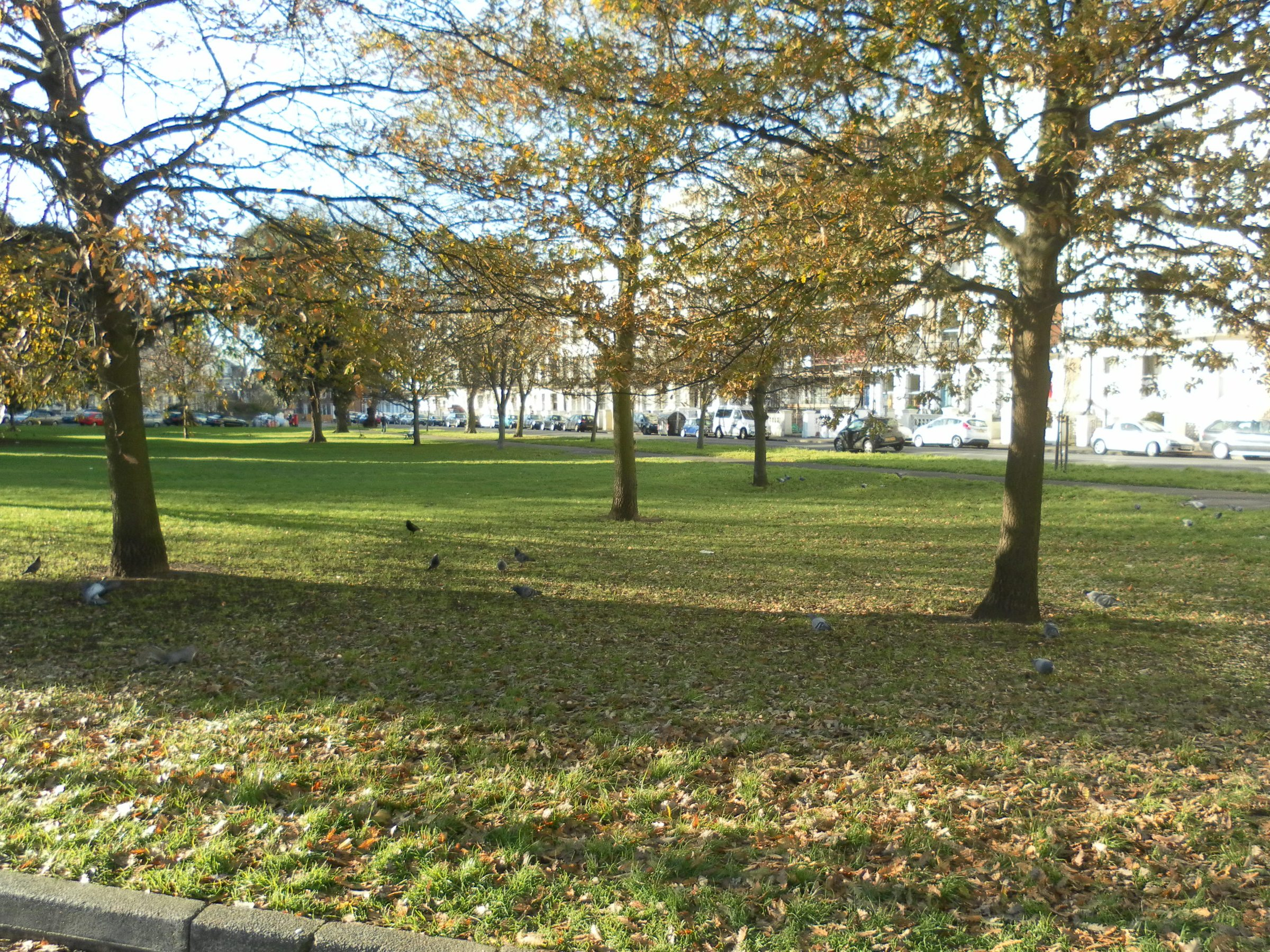
"Very pleasant" open space survives in front of the crescent.

The older central section of Montpelier Crescent (incorporating numbers 7–31) was listed at Grade II* on 13 October 1952. The mid-1850s section were separately listed at the lower Grade II in four parts, covering numbers 1–3, 4–6, 32–33 and 34–38.

Montpelier Crescent forms part of the 75.4 acres (30.5 ha) Montpelier & Clifton Hill Conservation Area, one of 34 conservation areas in the city of Brighton and Hove. This area was designated by the council in 1973. Describing the crescent as "one of the architectural set-pieces for which [it] is rightly renowned" and "probably one of Brighton's most famous landmarks", the council has identified several features by which Montpelier Crescent contributes to the character of the conservation area. Good tree cover, both in the back gardens and in front of the crescent on the "very pleasant" green, the use of pale cream-coloured paint to improve the architectural harmony of the façades, the existence of a rare "Edward VII"-style pillar box, and the relationship with the "imposing" Vernon Terrace opposite, create "a townscape of outstanding quality".

== Architecture ==
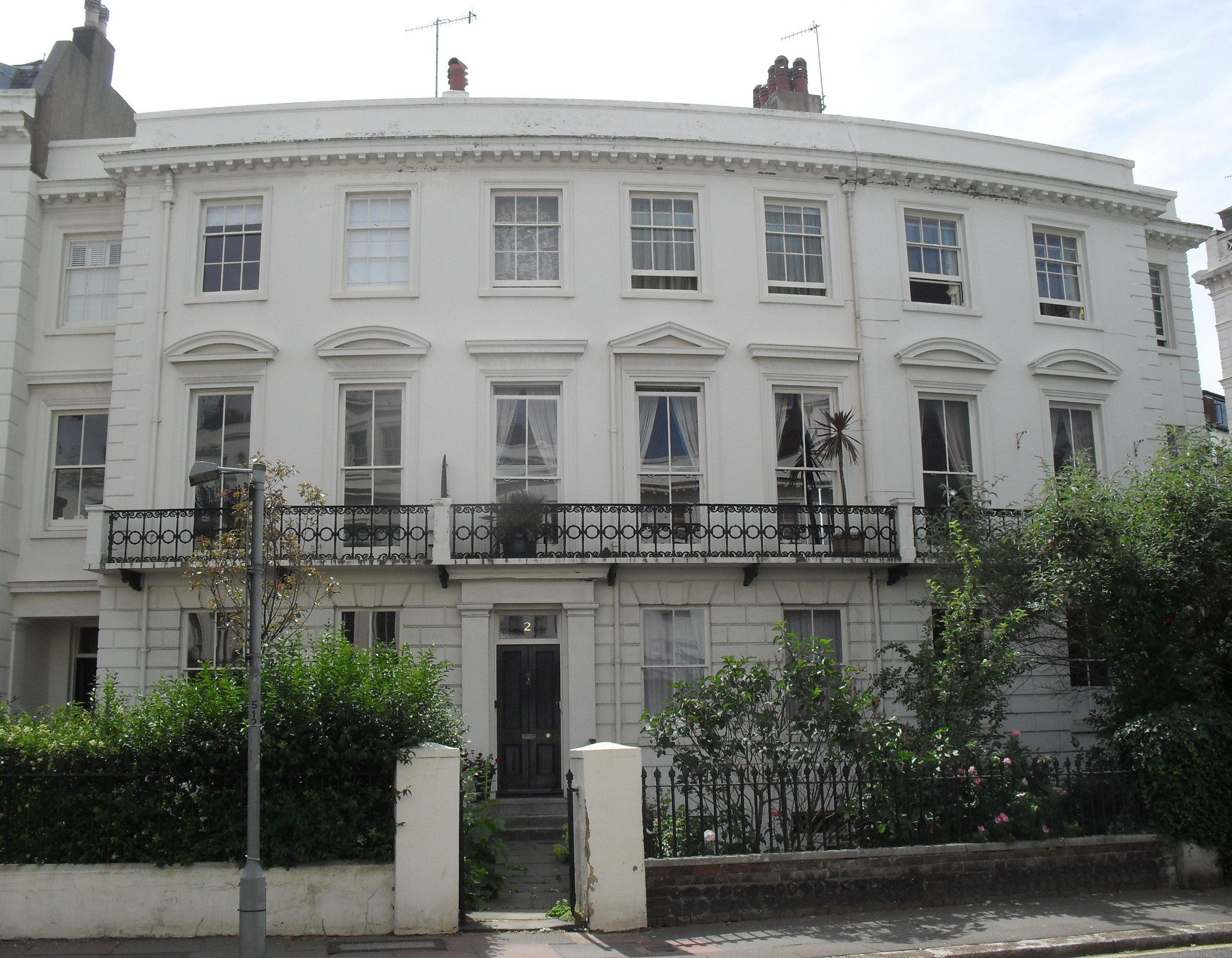
1–3 Montpelier Crescent

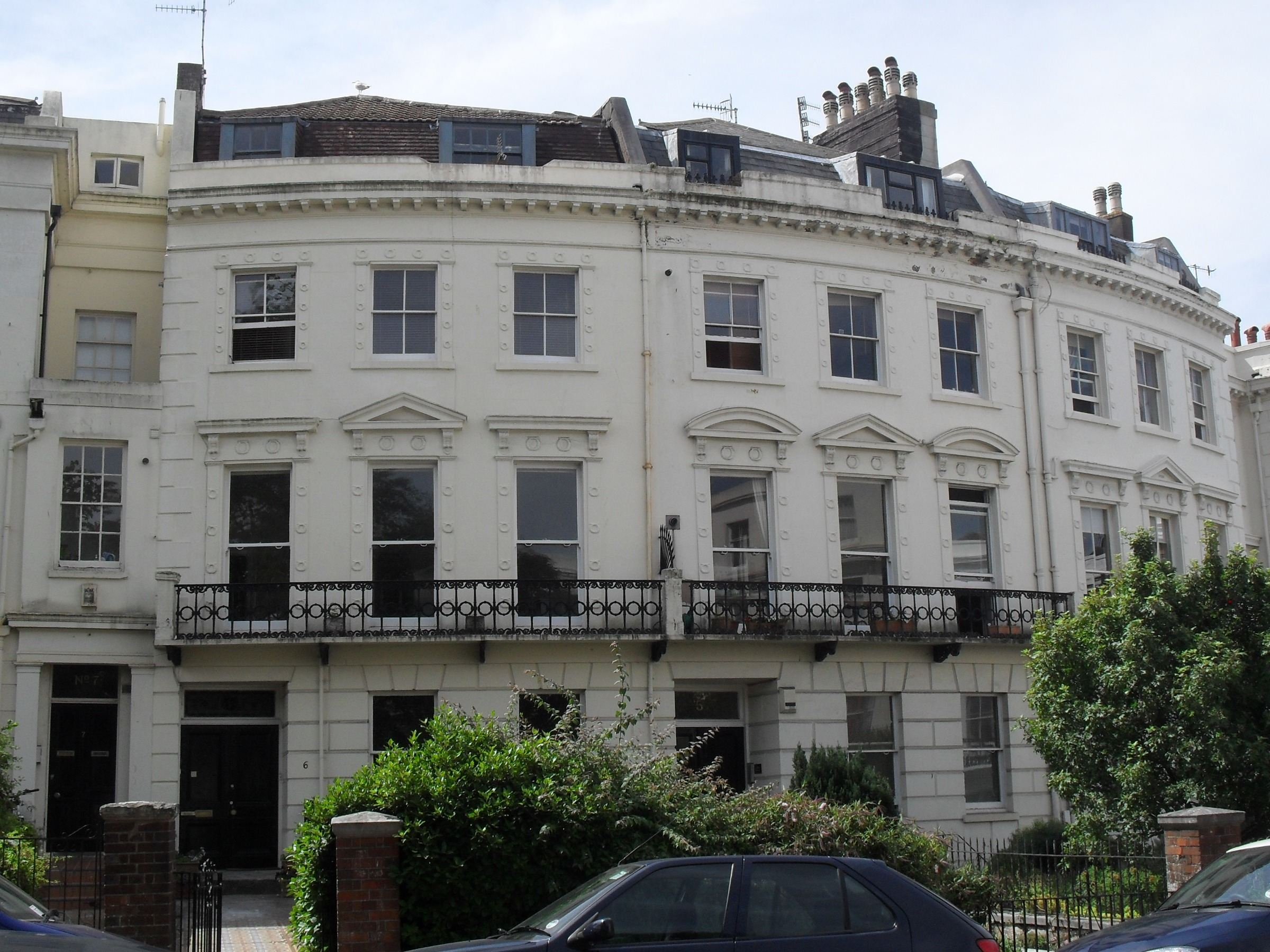
4–6 Montpelier Crescent

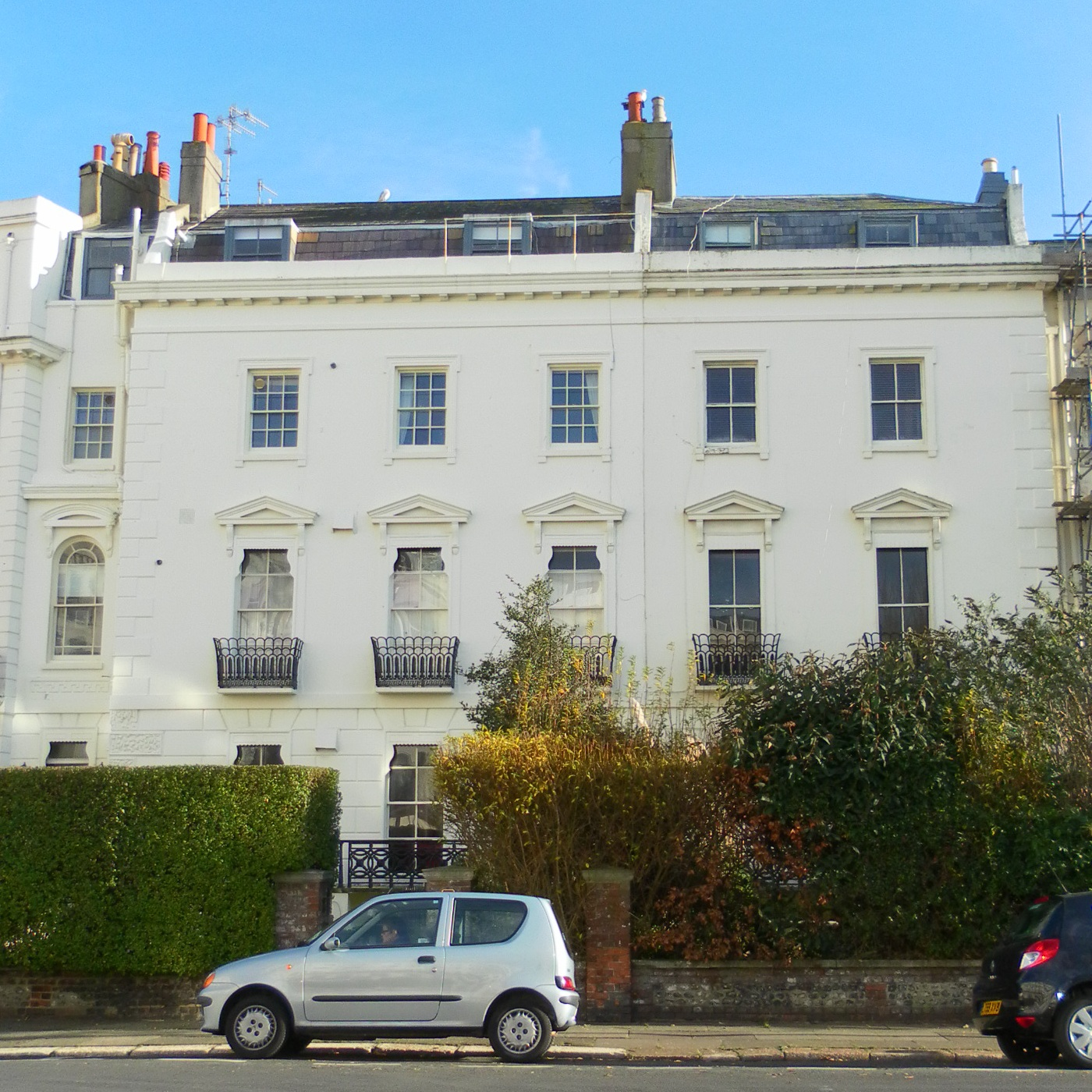
32 and 33 Montpelier Crescent

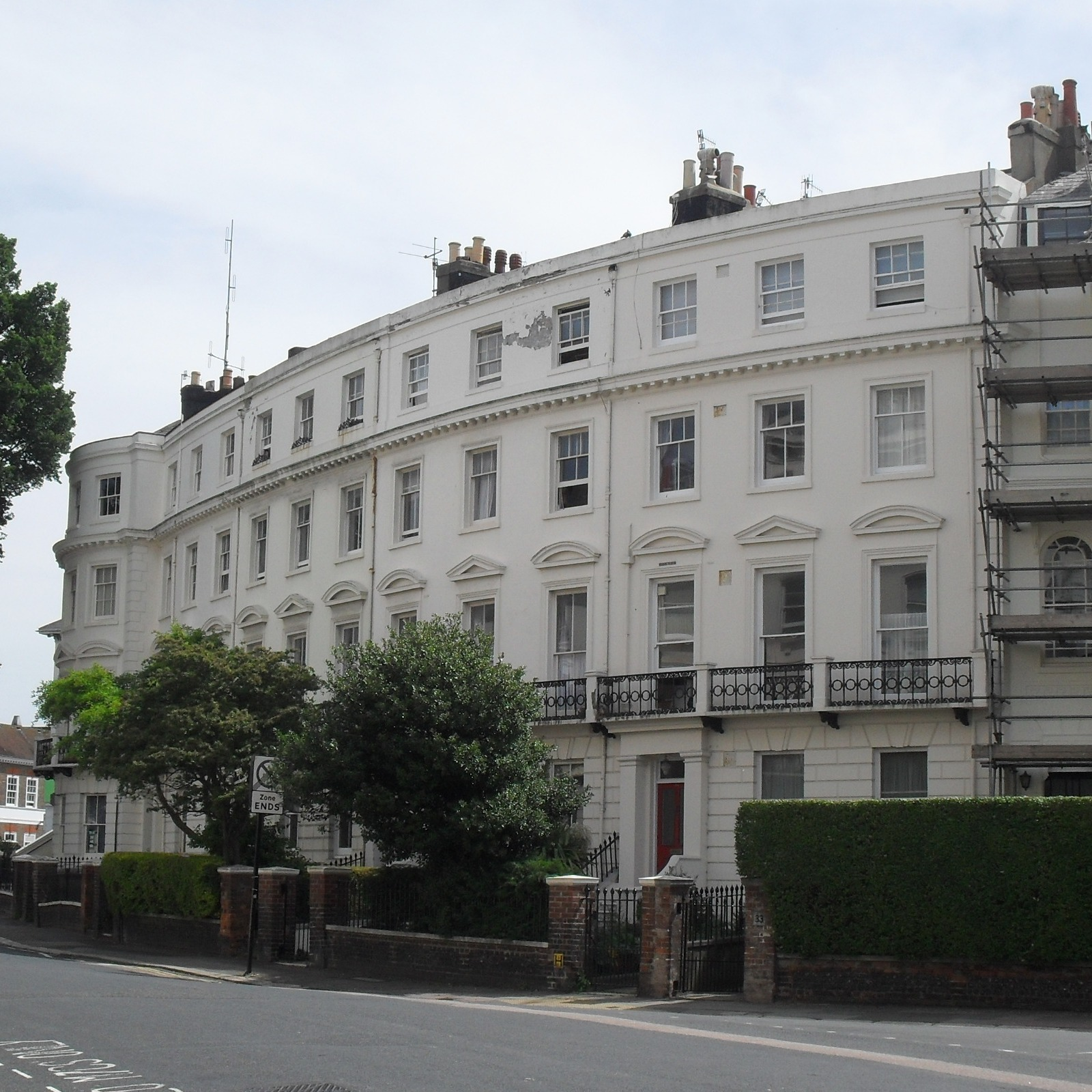
34–38 Montpelier Crescent

Work took place over the course of more than 10 years (Wilds completed the central section in 1847, and the other parts were added in about 1855), and the differences in design make the crescent "difficult to appreciate as a single composition". Despite this lack of coherence, the overall effect is of a "magnificent sweeping crescent". Each unit was designed as a villa-style mansion and was linked to its neighbours under large pediments. The development took place at the point in Brighton's development when Regency architecture was evolving into the Victorians' interpretation of the Italianate style. Amon Henry Wilds designed four landmark residential crescents, of which Montpelier Crescent was the third; the others were Hanover Crescent (Brighton), Park Crescent (Brighton) and Park Crescent (Worthing). Architectural historians have noted that Montpelier Crescent's inland-facing orientation "surprises": most squares and crescents in Brighton and Hove were built facing the sea, and its layout was accordingly unusual. Hanover Crescent was another example of a west/northwest-facing development, which may have encouraged Wilds to try the layout again.

=== 1–3 Montpelier Crescent ===
These three houses rise to three storeys and form a slightly outward-curving nine-bay composition whose outermost bays (containing the entrances for numbers 1 and 3) are recessed. The curved effect is much less pronounced than in the centre of the crescent. At first-floor level, a cast iron balcony supported on brackets spans the other seven bays. The houses are topped by a parapet which is supported on a modillion cornice and which continues round the side elevation of number 1, which faces Clifton Hill. Each house has a three-window range; those at first-floor level have architraves of various styles (flat cornices, curved pediments and triangular pediments), while at the top floor original sash windows survive. The doors, which are four-panelled and have decorative fanlights, are set in porches flanked by pilasters and topped by an entablature. The ground-floor walls are heavily rusticated. The roof has chimneys at the sides and is hidden behind the continuous parapet.

=== 4–6 Montpelier Crescent ===
Similar to their neighbours at the end of the crescent, these three houses have three windows to each of three storeys and have stuccoed, partly rusticated façades which curve outwards slightly. There are differences as well: the outer bays of the outermost houses are not recessed, every window is set in a moulded surround with pedimental architraves and "unusual" wreath-shaped decoration, and the slate-tiled roof (a hipped mansard) is visible behind the low parapet and cornice. The roof also has dormer windows.

=== 7–31 Montpelier Crescent ===
The 25 houses in the original section of the crescent form a northwest-facing concave curve. The composition consists of ten "blocks", each linked to the next by a recessed one- or two-storey wing and each with either two or three houses (a layout found nowhere else in Brighton). From north to south (starting at number 7) the pattern is 3–3–3–2–2–2–2–2–3–3. Each house is clad with stucco and painted pale cream. The crescent rises to three storeys throughout, except for the smaller linking bays, and most houses have parapets which hide their tiled roofs. Amon Henry Wilds did not use a consistent design for each building, and he used various decorative elements such as moulded wreaths and his characteristic ammonite capital design. Invented by George Dance the Younger but popularised by Wilds, the shell-shaped volutes of the capitals recall ammonite fossils. Other Wilds-built houses in Castle Place, Western Terrace, Oriental Place, Hanover Crescent, Old Steine and Montpelier Road display them.

Each house has three windows to each storey (except numbers 24 and 25, with four each); in some cases, original sash windows survive, and window surrounds vary between straight-headed and round-arched. Many are flanked by small pilasters supporting an entablature. Each block is capped by a large pediment supported on full-height fluted Corinthian pilasters. Many of these pilasters are topped with ammonite capitals, and there are some slight differences: the pilasters at number 29 lack fluting, and those at number 30 have a panelled pattern. The stucco is rusticated at ground-floor level. Some houses have cast iron balconies at either first- or ground-floor level; the latter are more intricate and are later additions.

=== 32–33 Montpelier Crescent ===
This pair of stucco-fronted houses are not symmetrical: number 32 (the more southerly of the two) has three windows to each storey, but number 33 has four. They are both flat-fronted with no curve, and share a slate mansard roof in which small dormer windows are inset. This spans the central five bays; the outermost bays are set back, have partly vermiculated quoins on their inner sides, and have an entrance (with a fanlight and a segmental arch) at ground-floor level. There are cast iron balconies at ground- and first-floor level; the former runs across the width of the building, whereas each first-floor window has an individual balcony. Some windows have decorative pediments and architraves.

=== 34–38 Montpelier Crescent ===
The northern end of Montpelier Crescent curves outwards and ends (at number 38) in a large projecting bay. At ground-floor level across the whole width of the five-house terrace is heavy rustication. The roof is hidden behind a parapet with a modillion cornice and a fourth (attic) storey with another cornice. Most of the windows have architraves or pediments (either curved or triangular) and are straight-headed. A continuous cast-iron balcony, supported on brackets and separated at intervals by stuccoed piers, spans the houses at first-floor level. Number 38's entrance faces Dyke Road at Seven Dials and has a two-storey entrance porch with decorative mouldings and pilasters.

== See also ==
- Grade II* listed buildings in Brighton and Hove
- Grade II listed buildings in Brighton and Hove: M

== Bibliography ==
- Antram, Nicholas; Morrice, Richard (2008). Brighton and Hove. Pevsner Architectural Guides. London: Yale University Press. ISBN 978-0-300-12661-7.
- Berry, Sue (2005). Georgian Brighton. Chichester: Phillimore & Co. Ltd. ISBN 1-86077-342-7.
- Brighton Polytechnic. School of Architecture and Interior Design (1987). A Guide to the Buildings of Brighton. Macclesfield: McMillan Martin. ISBN 1-869865-03-0.
- Carder, Timothy (1990). The Encyclopaedia of Brighton. Lewes: East Sussex County Libraries. ISBN 0-86147-315-9.
- Collis, Rose (2010). The New Encyclopaedia of Brighton. (based on the original by Tim Carder) (1st ed.). Brighton: Brighton & Hove Libraries. ISBN 978-0-9564664-0-2.
- Dale, Antony (1967) [1947]. Fashionable Brighton 1820–1860 (2nd ed.). Newcastle-upon-Tyne: Oriel Press Ltd. ISBN 0-85362-028-8.
- Musgrave, Clifford (1981). Life in Brighton. Rochester: Rochester Press. ISBN 0-571-09285-3.
- Myall, Steve (2008). The Victorian Development of the Clifton, Montpelier and Powis Estates of Brighton. Lewes: Pomegranate Press. ISBN 978-0-9559006-0-0.
- Nairn, Ian; Pevsner, Nikolaus (1965). The Buildings of England: Sussex. Harmondsworth: Penguin Books. ISBN 0-14-071028-0.
- s.n. (1998). A selection of notes on the History of Hove and Brighton including a History of Hove street names and early maps of Hove. Brighton: Brighton & Hove Libraries.
