= Lillywhite's Ground =

Cricket ground in Brighton, Sussex, England

Coordinates: 50.82966°N 0.14859°W

Ground information
- Location: Brighton, Sussex
- Establishment: 1831

Team information
Gentlemen of Sussex	(1839)
Sussex	(1842)
- As of 27 August 2010; Source: Ground profile

Lillywhite's Ground was a cricket ground in Brighton, Sussex. The ground is named after Frederick William Lillywhite, one of the greatest bowlers of all time, who was the proprietor of the ground at a time when he lived in Brighton and ran the Royal Sovereign Inn in Preston Street.

The first recorded match on the ground came in 1838, when the Gentlemen of Sussex played the Players of Sussex in a non first-class match. The first first-class match held at the ground came in 1839 when the Gentlemen of Sussex played the Marylebone Cricket Club. The second and final first-class match held on the ground came in 1842 when Sussex played England, with Sussex winning by 6 runs.

While in Brighton and trying to cash in on his fame, Lillywhite lost a large amount of money, a fact he blamed on his landlord. His landlord was a patron to Sussex, with Lillywhite vowing never to play for Sussex again while his landlord had an interest in the ground. In 1844 he left Brighton for London, after which cricket at the ground declined and ceased to be played. The ground was located roughly where Montpelier Crescent is today.
