= Seven Dials, Brighton =

Neighbourhood of Brighton, England

Coordinates: 50°49′51″N 0°08′51″W

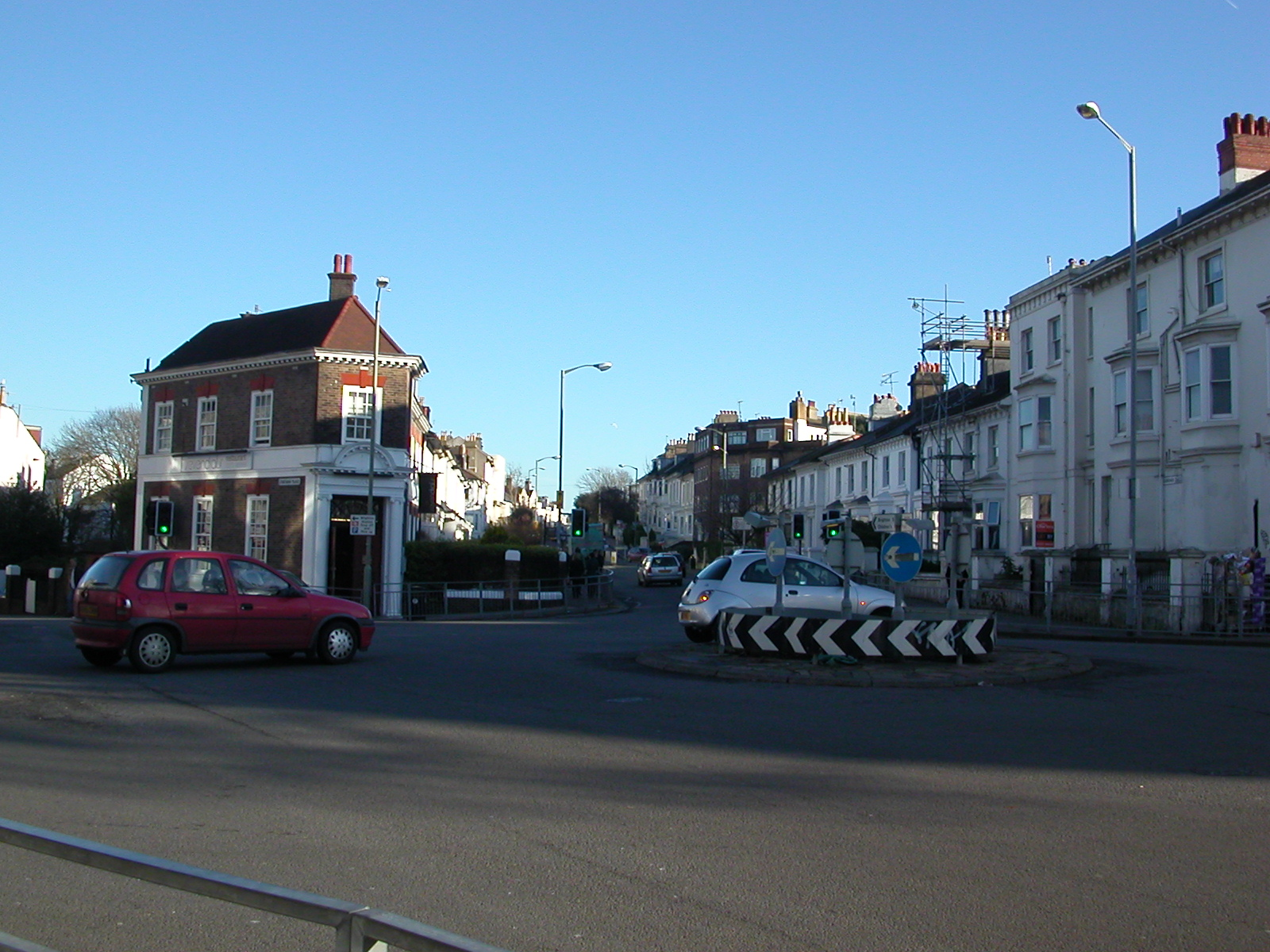
Seven Dials roundabout from Goldsmid Road, looking towards Chatham Place (left) and Buckingham Place (centre).

Seven Dials is a district surrounding a major road junction of the same name in Brighton, in the city of Brighton and Hove, England. It is located on high ground just northwest of Brighton railway station, south of the Prestonville area, and approximately ¾ mile (1 km) north of the seafront.

The name refers to the seven roads which radiate outwards from the roundabout-controlled junction, and is derived from a seven-way junction in London featuring a monument with six sundials. The roundabout itself, constructed in 1925 is notable as an early example of this type of road junction in the UK, and preceded the installation of semaphore signals in Brighton in 1927.

== Location ==
In central Brighton, where seven roads meet; clockwise from the north, these are:

- Prestonville Road
- Chatham Place, (B2122) leading to New England Road and Preston Circus - another major road junction
- Buckingham Place, (A2010) leading to the railway station by way of a sharply curving downhill slope
- Dyke Road,(A2121) one of the city's main roads - leading to the city centre
- Vernon Terrace,(B2122) leading to Montpelier Road and the seafront
- Goldsmid Road,(sic) (B2020) leading into Davigdor Road and Cromwell Road into Hove
- The northward continuation of Dyke Road, (A2010) leading eventually to the Devil's Dyke beauty spot on the South Downs

== Development ==
The area began to be developed with a mixture of terraced houses and more substantial Victorian villas shortly after the London and Brighton Railway opened sections of its lines in the area. The route westwards to Shoreham-by-Sea (opened in 1840) ran through the area, while the Brighton Main Line (1841) and the throat of Brighton station lie on the eastern edge.

A 2013 revamp of the junction intended to improve its appearance, make it safer for cyclists, and easier for pedestrians. There was some disagreement during the public consultation phase beforehand. A campaign to prevent the removal of an elm tree from the top of Vernon Terrace – with protesters camping in the tree — was successful, with works being changed to keep it.

== Gallery ==
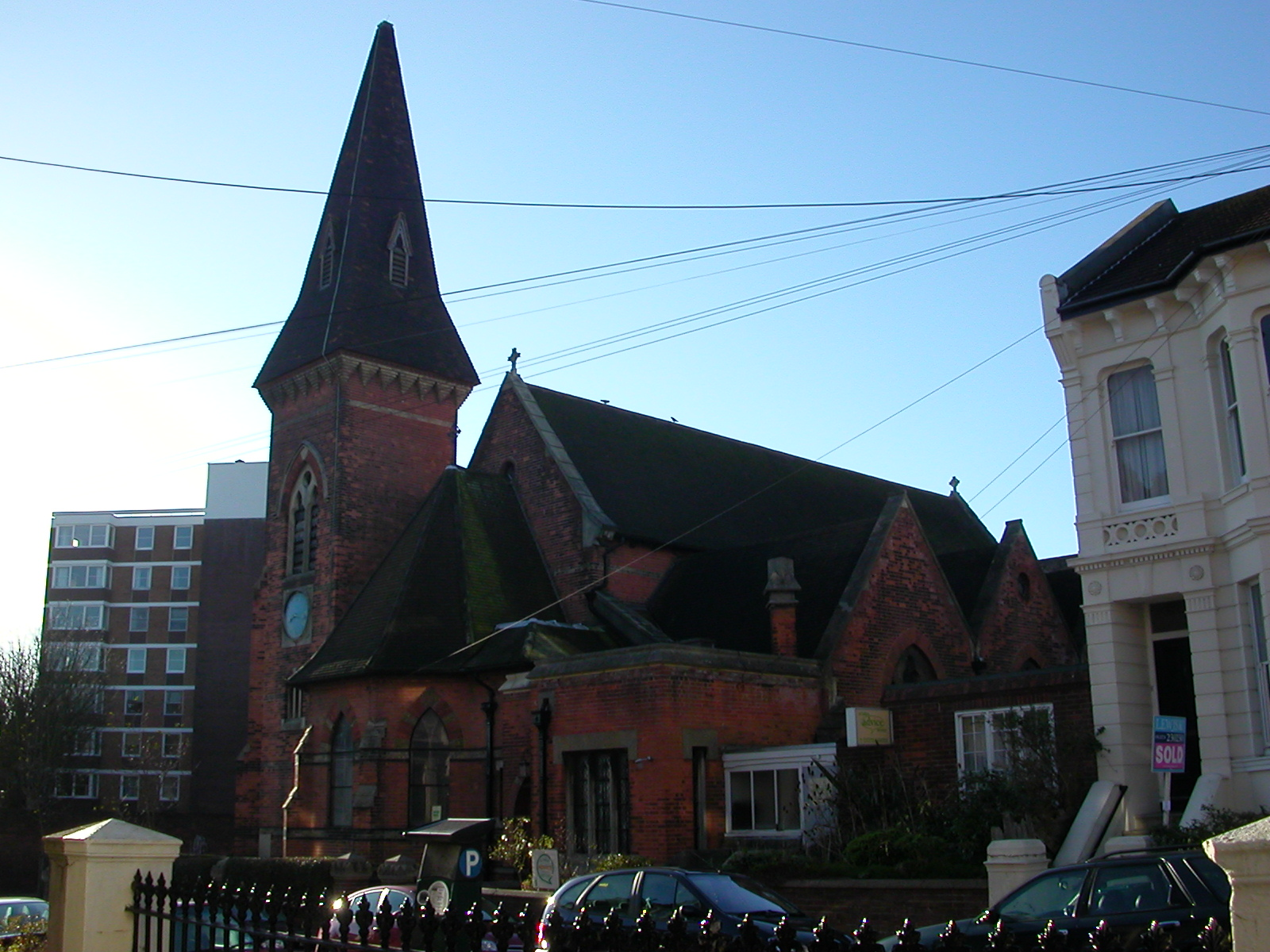
St Luke's Church, at 64 Old Shoreham Road, was built in 1875. The eastern side, on Stanford Road, is shown here.

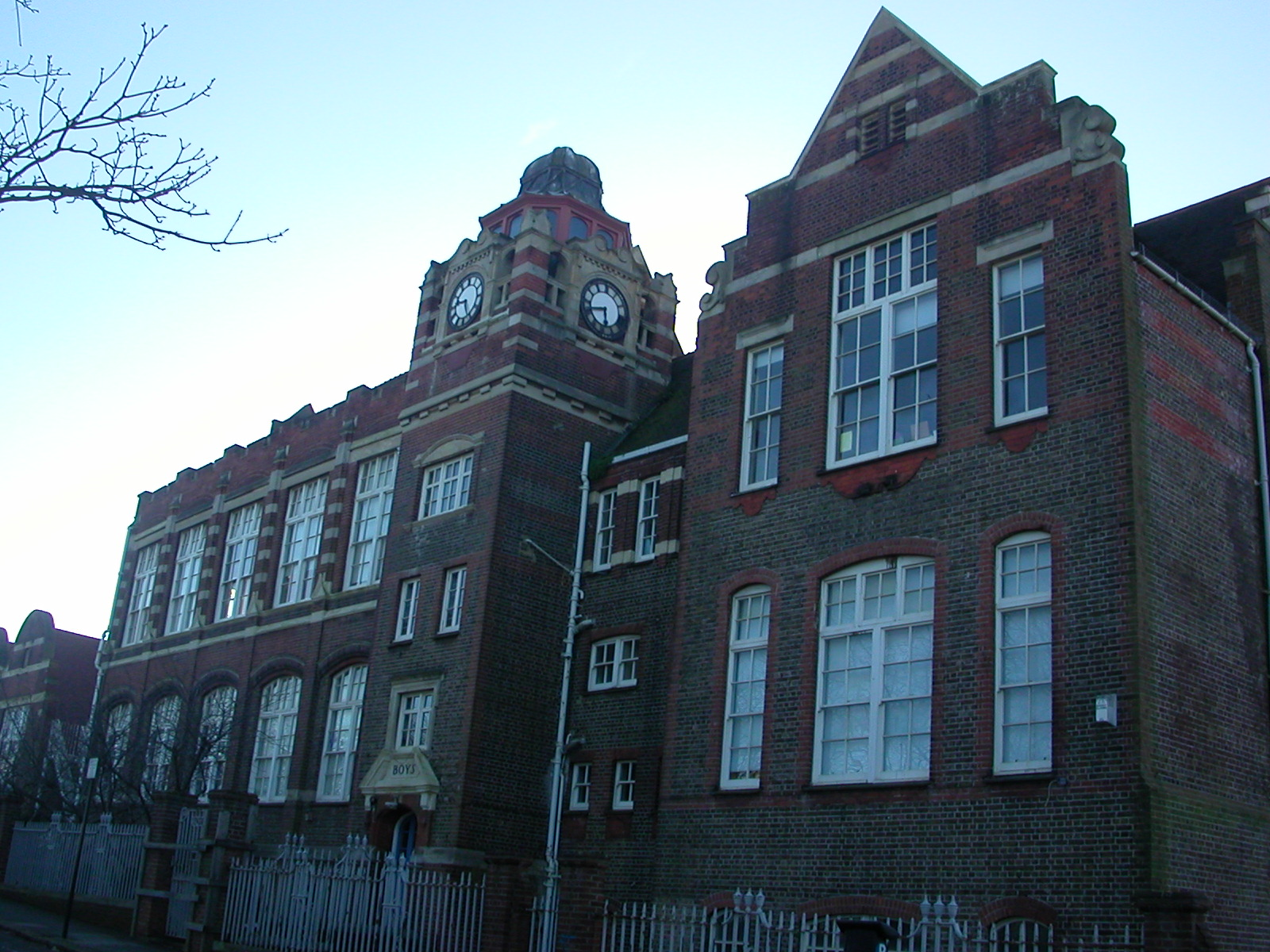
Stanford Road school, built in 1893. Notice the entrance marked "BOYS".

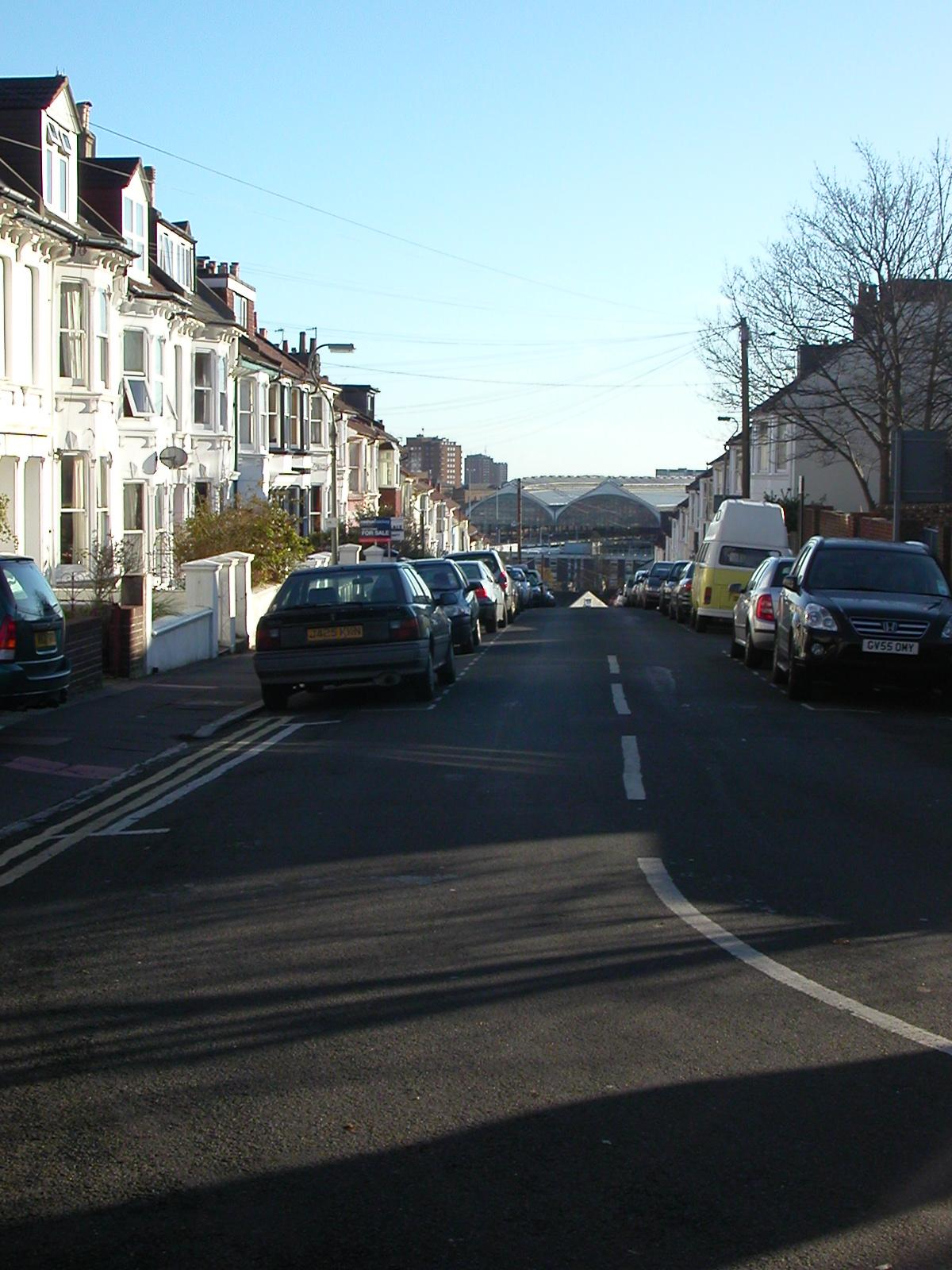
Hamilton Road runs south-eastwards down the hill, and looks down on the twin-arched roof of Brighton station.

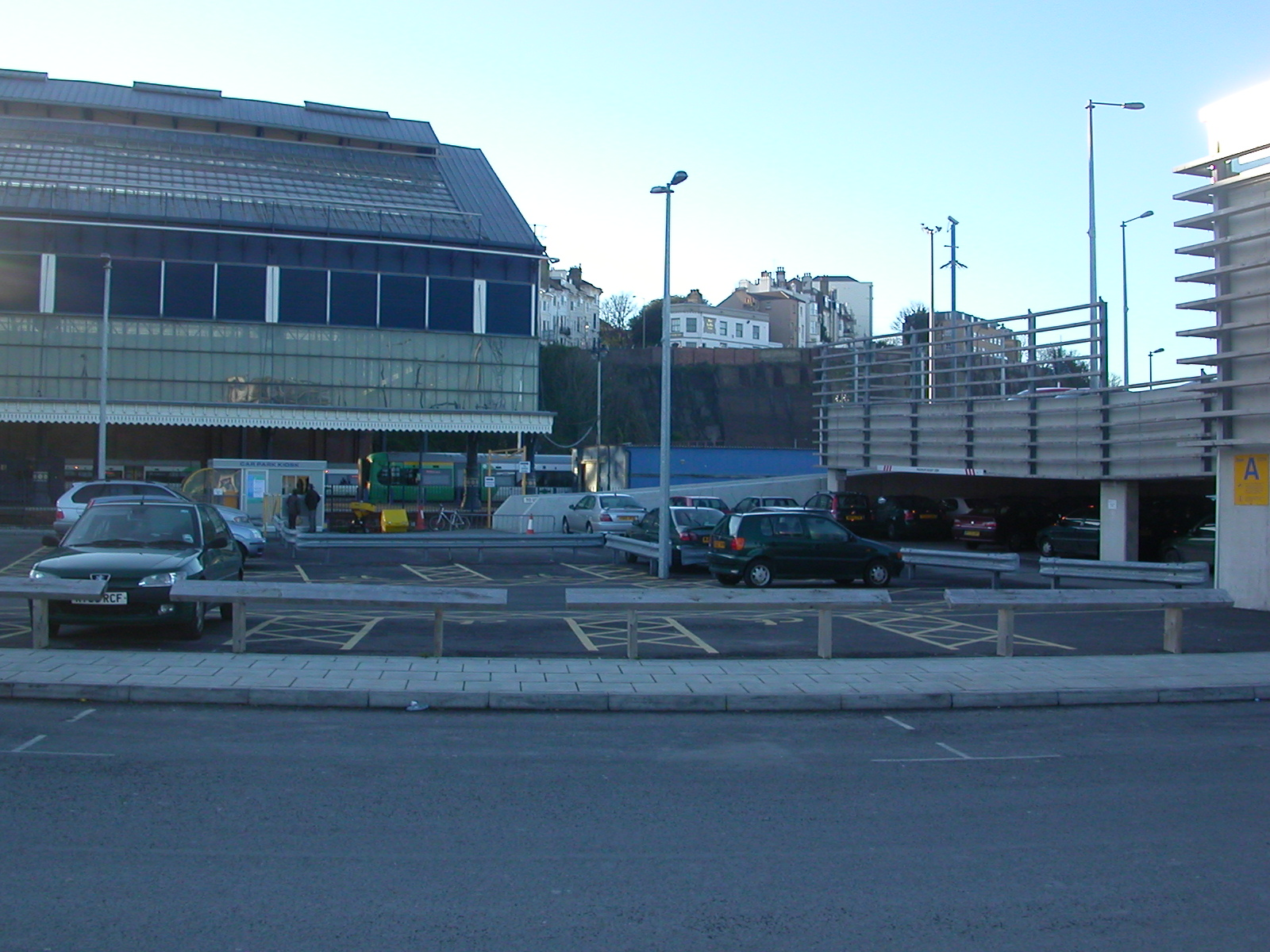
Looking up the hill towards Seven Dials, beyond Brighton station, emphasising the change in gradient. The buildings in the centre background are in Howard Place.

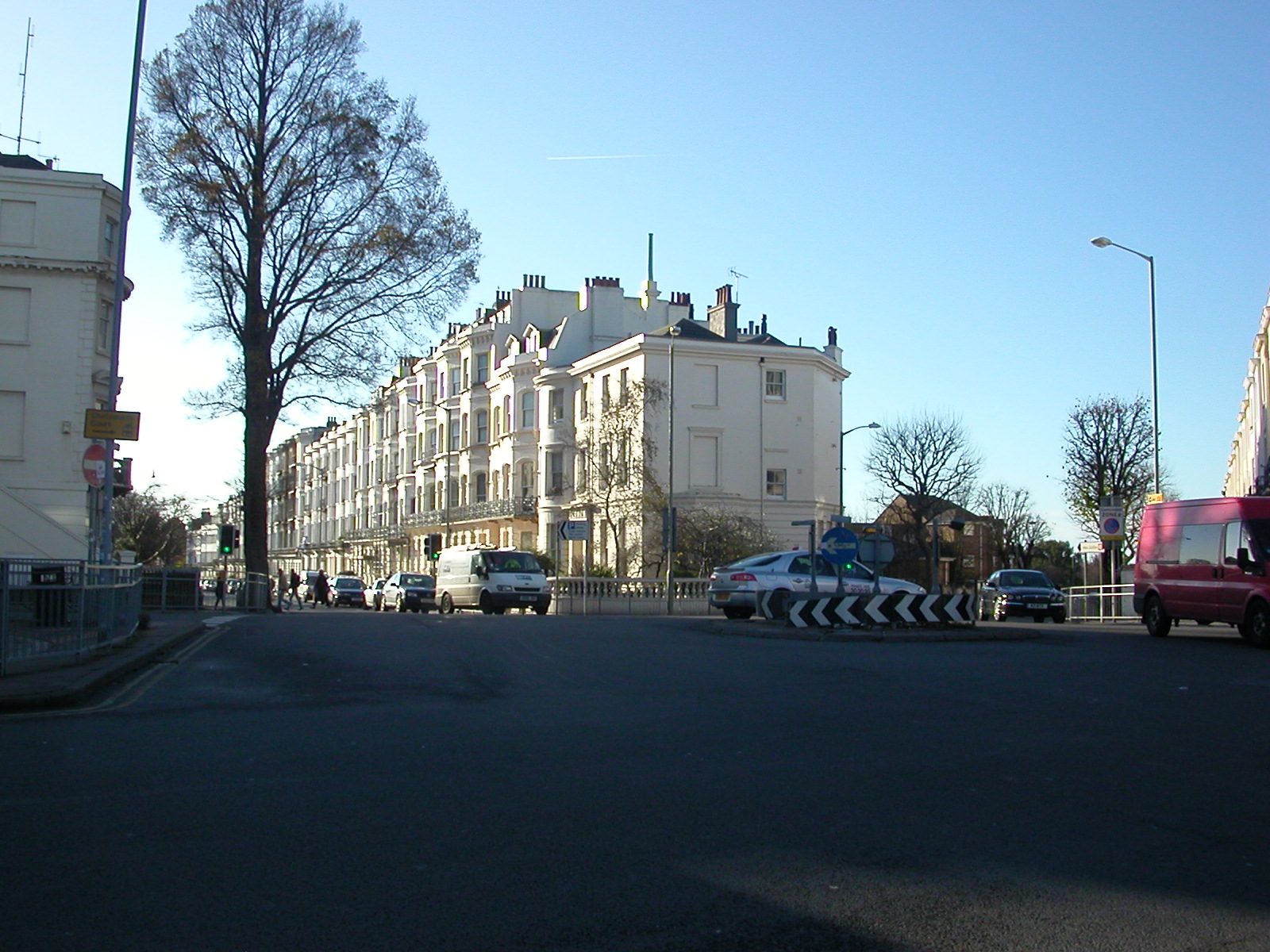
Seven Dials roundabout from Buckingham Place, looking west towards Vernon Terrace (left) and Goldsmid Road (right).

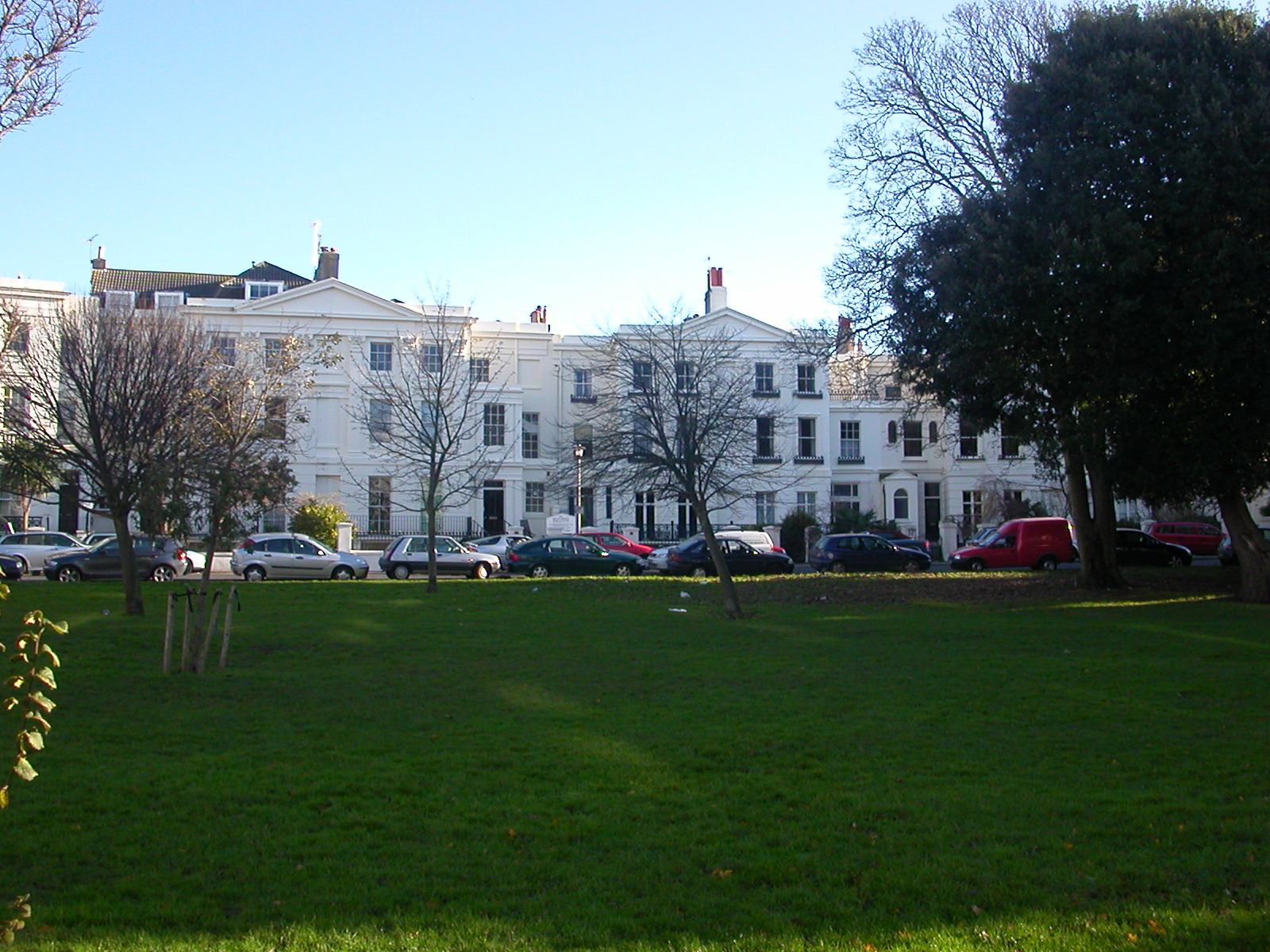
Montpelier Crescent is a crescent of houses opposite Vernon Terrace, just south of the Seven Dials roundabout.

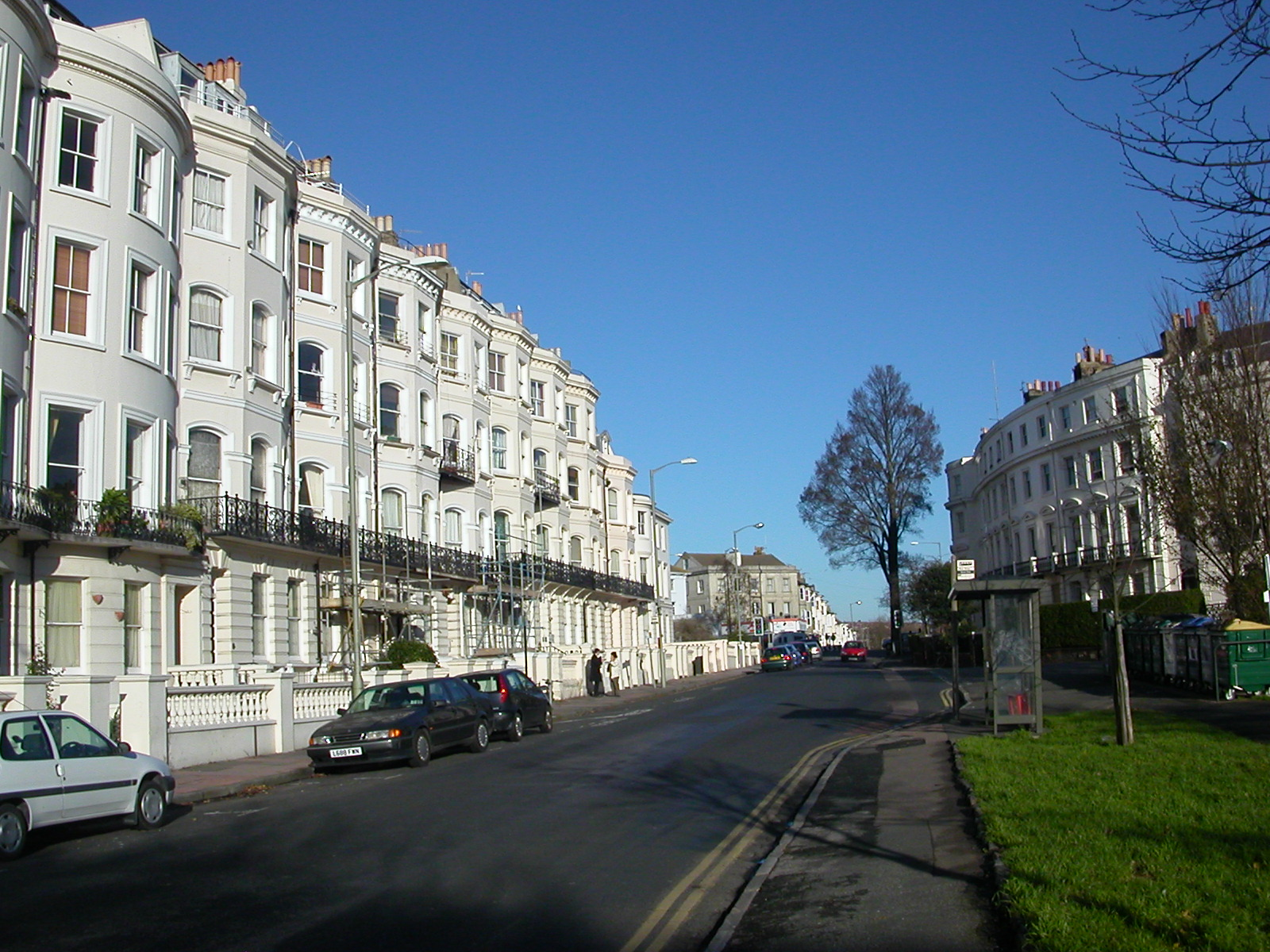
The northern end of Vernon Terrace, looking towards Seven Dials (the tree is close to the junction itself). The start of Montpelier Crescent is on the right.
