= Tower House, Brighton =

Grade II listed building in Brighton, United Kingdom

Tower House
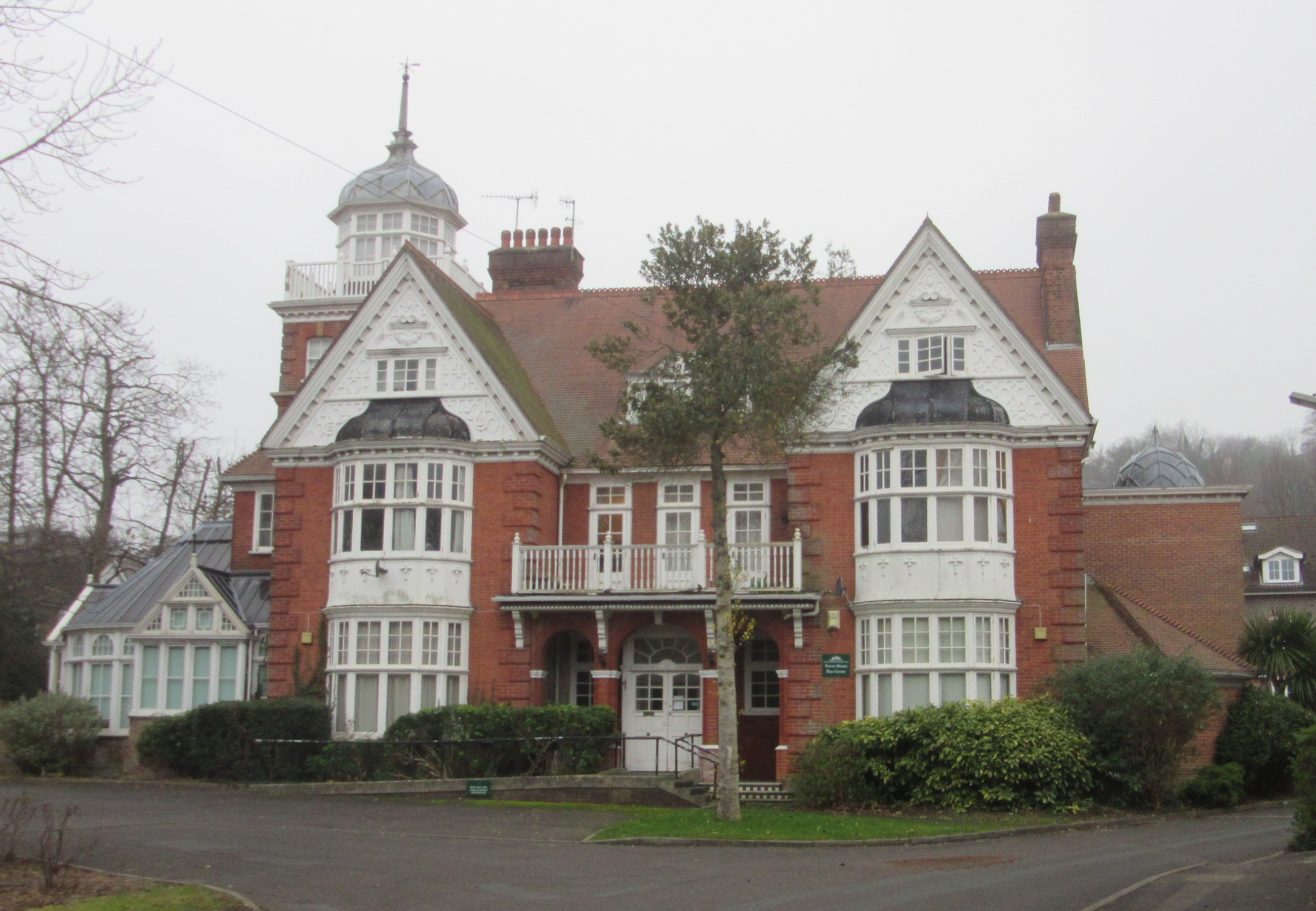
- Tower House seen from the east

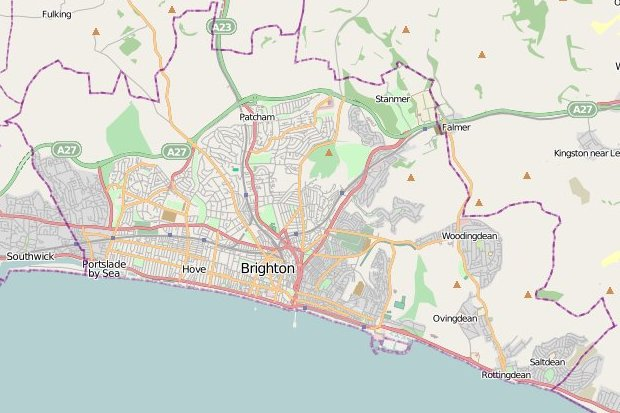
- Location within Brighton and Hove
- 50.8472°N 0.1531°W
- Location: 265–267 London Road, Withdean, Brighton and Hove BN1 6UF, United Kingdom

History
- Built: 1902
- Built for: James John Savage

Site notes
- Architect(s): George Burstow & Sons
- Architectural style: Edwardian/Queen Anne Revival
- Restored: 1988

Listed Building – Grade II
- Official name: Tower House
- Designated: 26 August 1999
- Reference no.: 1381677

Tower House is a former private house in the Withdean area of the English coastal city of Brighton and Hove. Built in 1902 for a former jeweller to King Edward VII, it remained in private ownership until it was converted into flats and a daycare centre in 1988. It is one of the few large houses and villas to survive in the high-class Withdean area—many were demolished in favour of blocks of flats after World War II—and it has been described as "Brighton's finest example of a grand Edwardian house". English Heritage has listed the building at Grade II for its architectural and historical importance.

== History ==
Withdean was originally an outlying hamlet in the large Sussex parish of Patcham, adjacent to Preston parish which was itself immediately north of Brighton. The area was merely "a scattering of farms" until the 19th century, when its position on the main road to London and extensive tree planting carried out from the 1790s made it an attractive place for wealthy people to build large houses and villas. The road was originally a turnpike and had a tollgate at Preston; after it was moved north of Withdean in 1854, people living to the south no longer had to pay tolls to travel into Brighton, further improving the desirability of the largely undeveloped land. Around the same time, the Withdean Strawberry Gardens were developed as an attraction for visitors (especially from Brighton, by now a rapidly growing resort) and residents. They were renamed the Tivoli Gardens in about 1852, and remained a popular attraction throughout the 19th century. By the end of the century, though, they were surrounded by large houses, and in 1888 they were sold off for development.

In 1902, the larger part of the Tivoli Gardens site was bought by 55-year-old James John Savage, (Note: Some sources give his name as John James Savage.) former jeweller to King Edward VII, who wanted a large house to retire to with his family. He commissioned architects George Burstow & Sons to design a 12-bedroom house "with a tower, which would offer panoramic views over the surrounding neighbourhood". The building was completed in the same year, and he moved in with his wife, three daughters and a large retinue of servants. He lived there until his death in 1922, and his wife stayed for another 11 years until her death. In 1934 the house was sold at auction to another wealthy local family, the Berrymans, who had lived at a villa called Norbury (Note: This building survives but is now a hotel.) on the other side of London Road but who had lost much of their land when the road was widened. They paid £4,000 for Tower House.

The Auxiliary Territorial Service requisitioned the house during World War II, but it was returned to the Berryman family afterwards and stayed in private ownership until 1988. In that year the house, its grounds and the adjacent Tivoli House (built to the immediate north of Tower House in 1903, and latterly a Brighton Borough Council residential home) were acquired by developers Cussins Green Homes. They demolished Tivoli House and built modern blocks of flats (Robinia Lodge and Tower Gate) and a terrace of houses on the site and in the grounds. Tower House itself was retained, though, and was converted into ten flats and a daycare centre. The exterior was restored at the same time, and Tower House now appears as it would have done when built. Brighton and Hove City Council operate the day centre, which in 2011 was one of four "in-house building-based day services for older people" in the city. In November 2015, the council stated it was considering closing the day centre and moving the services offered to other locations or outsourcing them to the private sector. Impending cuts to Government grants were identified as the reason.

The upper floors of the building now have ten flats. One, the Crow's Nest, covers four storeys including the tower and the space inside its lead-covered cupola. "One of Brighton's most unique properties", it was put up for sale in 2007. In the same year, another two-bedroom flat in the building was on the market for £349,950.

Tower House was listed at Grade II by English Heritage on 26 August 1999. This status is awarded to "nationally important" buildings of "special interest". As of February 2001, it was one of 1,124 Grade II-listed buildings and structures, and 1,218 listed buildings of all grades, in the city of Brighton and Hove. The house is also within the boundary of the Preston Park Conservation Area, one of 34 conservation areas in Brighton and Hove. Originally designated in 1970 as part of the Preston Village Conservation Area, this was split into a separate area in 1988. The conservation area appraisal states that "the most regrettable aspect" of the late-20th-century development surrounding Tower House is the creation of a wide access road which breaks the long run of original boundary walls fronting London Road.

== Architecture ==
Tower House, "Brighton's finest example of a grand Edwardian house", is an "imposing and richly detailed" building which—despite being set back from the main London Road—forms a local landmark due to its tall corner tower with a large lead cupola. This has ogee curves and sits on top of an octagonal timber roof lantern. The house is constructed of red brick in the Edwardian/Queen Anne Revival style. It rises to 3–4 storeys and has a six-window range. The four-storey tower at the south corner is recessed; the main building has a symmetrical façade composed of two projecting gabled wings with two-storey bay windows and a central recessed three-bay entrance wing. This has a porch in the form of a three-arched arcade, above which projects a wooden balcony. On the roof between the gables is a small dormer window with a curved gable on which is painted the year 1902 and the Savage family's monogram. Further back on the south side is a gabled single-storey conservatory. To the rear are another two gabled wings, the gables tile-hung and with cornices. There is also a wide ironwork veranda. Some original features survive inside, including an arched fireplace, decorative panelling and a Doric-columned arcade, but the central divided staircase and a stained glass ceiling which illuminated the entrance hall were removed during the renovations of 1988.

The house "contained all the necessary rooms for living in traditional Edwardian style. There were 17 rooms excluding the "compact domestic offices" for servants, (Note: The domestic staff during the Savage family's time in the house consisted of three maids, a cook, a gardener and a chauffeur.) and the grounds covered 2 acres (0.81 ha). The auction particulars of 1934 stated that there were eight "principal" and four "secondary" bedrooms, "three bathrooms, four reception rooms, spacious hall, billiard room, ... garage, conservatory and outbuildings". Unusual features typically seen only in much more modern houses included an underfloor heating system and a combined bath and shower unit.

== See also ==
- Buildings and architecture of Brighton and Hove

== Bibliography ==
- Antram, Nicholas; Pevsner, Nikolaus (2013). Sussex: East with Brighton and Hove. The Buildings of England. London: Yale University Press. ISBN 978-0-300-18473-0.
- Carder, Timothy (1990). The Encyclopaedia of Brighton. Lewes: East Sussex County Libraries. ISBN 0-861-47315-9.
- Montford, Selma; Pollard, Jacqueline; Sanderson, Robert (1996). The Vanishing Villas of Preston & Withdean. Brighton: Brighton Books Publishing. ISBN 1-901454-00-2.
- Preston Village Millennium Project (2004). Preston: Downland Village to Brighton Suburb. Brighton: Brighton Books Publishing. ISBN 1-901454-07-X.
