= Vernon Terrace, Brighton =

Vernon Terrace
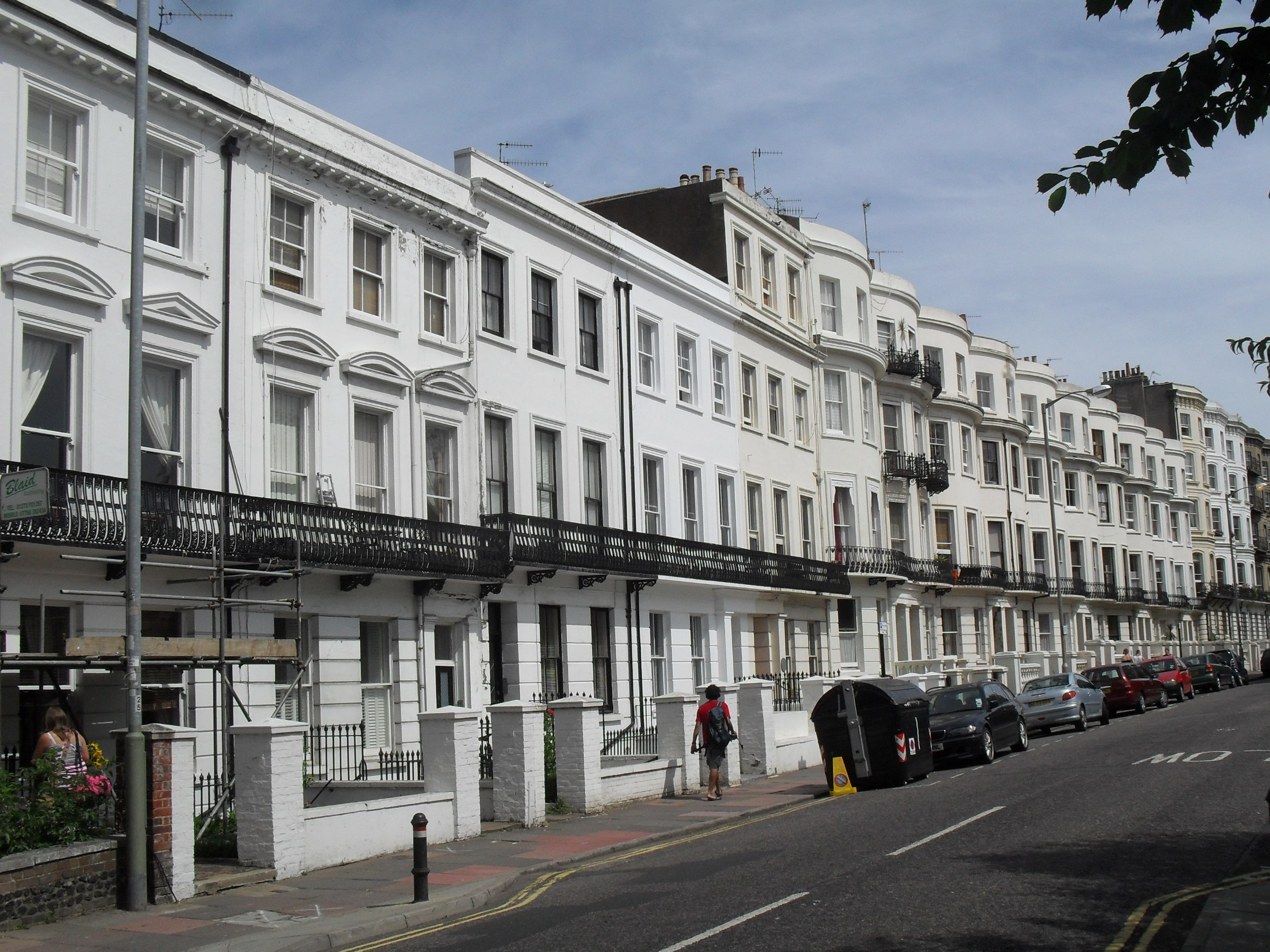
- Vernon Terrace from the south-southeast

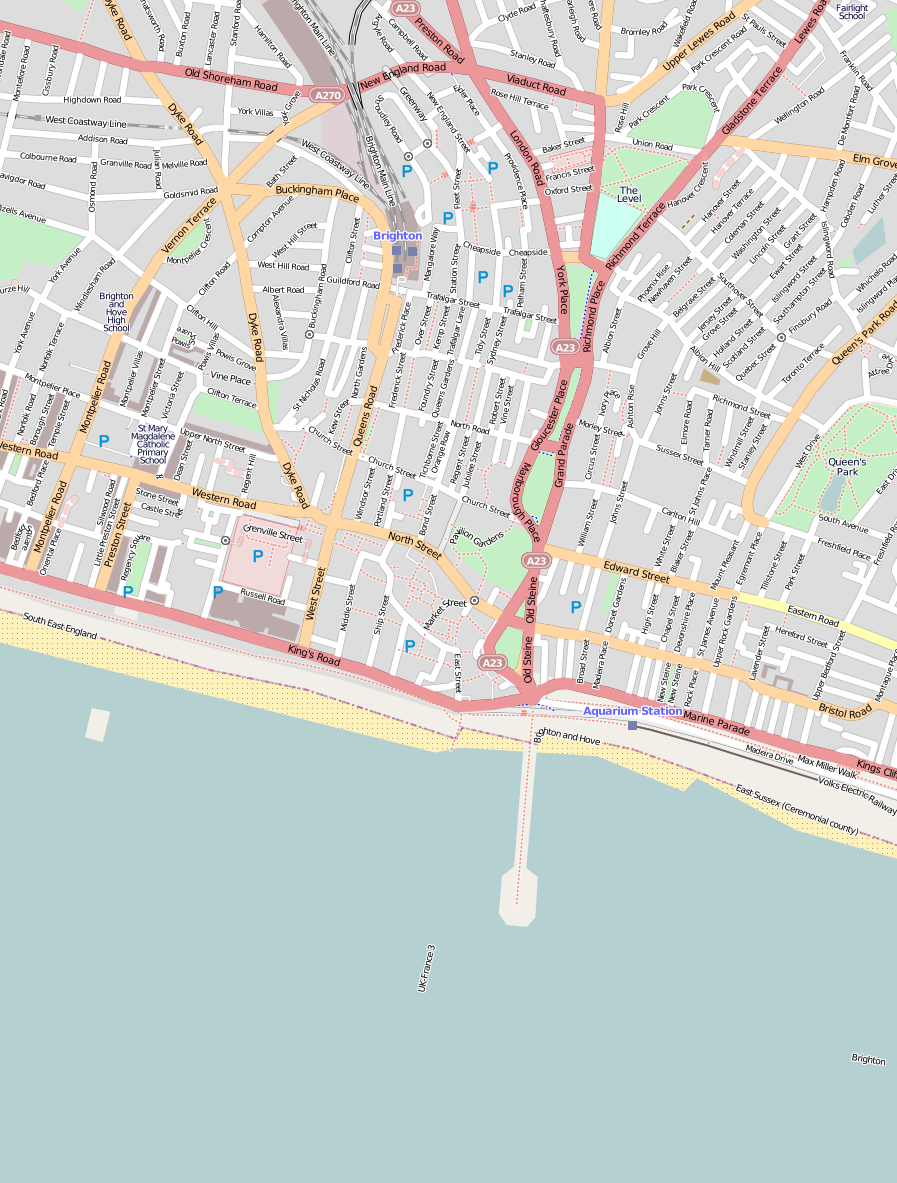
- Location of Vernon Terrace within central Brighton
- 50.8296°N 0.1496°W
- Location: Vernon Terrace, Montpelier, Brighton, Brighton and Hove, East Sussex, United Kingdom

History
- Built: 1856–57; c. 1860

Site notes
- Architectural style: Regency/Italianate

Listed Building – Grade II
- Official name: 1–6 Vernon Terrace and attached railings; 7–16 Vernon Terrace and attached gate piers and balustrades; 37 Vernon Terrace and attached wall and piers
- Designated: 20 August 1971; 26 August 1999

Vernon Terrace is a mid 19th-century residential development in the Montpelier suburb of Brighton, part of the English coastal city of Brighton and Hove. Construction of the first section started in 1856, and the 37-house terrace was complete in the early 1860s. Architecturally, the houses divide into five separate compositions, although all are in a similar late Regency/Italianate style. This was characteristic of houses of that era in Brighton, and especially in the Montpelier area—where the Regency style persisted much later than elsewhere. Standing opposite is the landmark Montpelier Crescent, which had a view of the South Downs until Vernon Terrace blocked it. Three groups of houses in the terrace have been listed at Grade II by English Heritage for their architectural and historical importance.

== History ==
Brighton (originally known as Brighthelmston) developed as a large fishing and agricultural village on the English Channel coast. Despite intermittent periods of decline and destitution, it was the largest town in the county of Sussex by 1600. In the mid-18th century, the damaging economic effects of a terminal decline in the fishing industry were reversed by the new fashion for sea-bathing, and the town's new role as a seaside resort began. Northwest of the old town, around the parish church and the road leading to Devil's Dyke and on to London, was an expanse of gently sloping downland known as Church Hill. It was given over to sheep-grazing and was owned by two prominent locals: MP Thomas Kemp and John Sackville, 3rd Duke of Dorset.

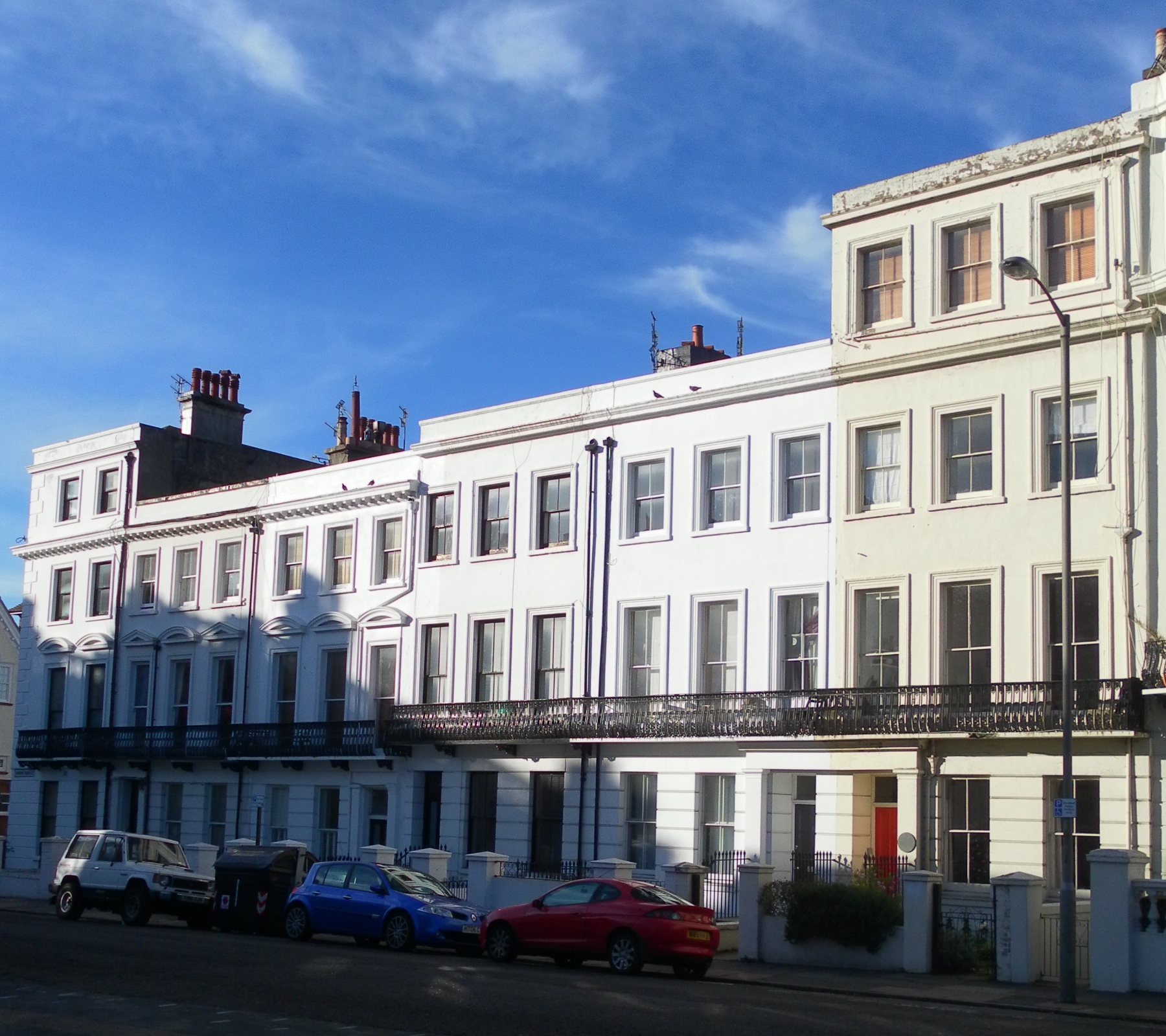
The flat-fronted numbers 1–6 are the oldest part of Vernon Terrace.

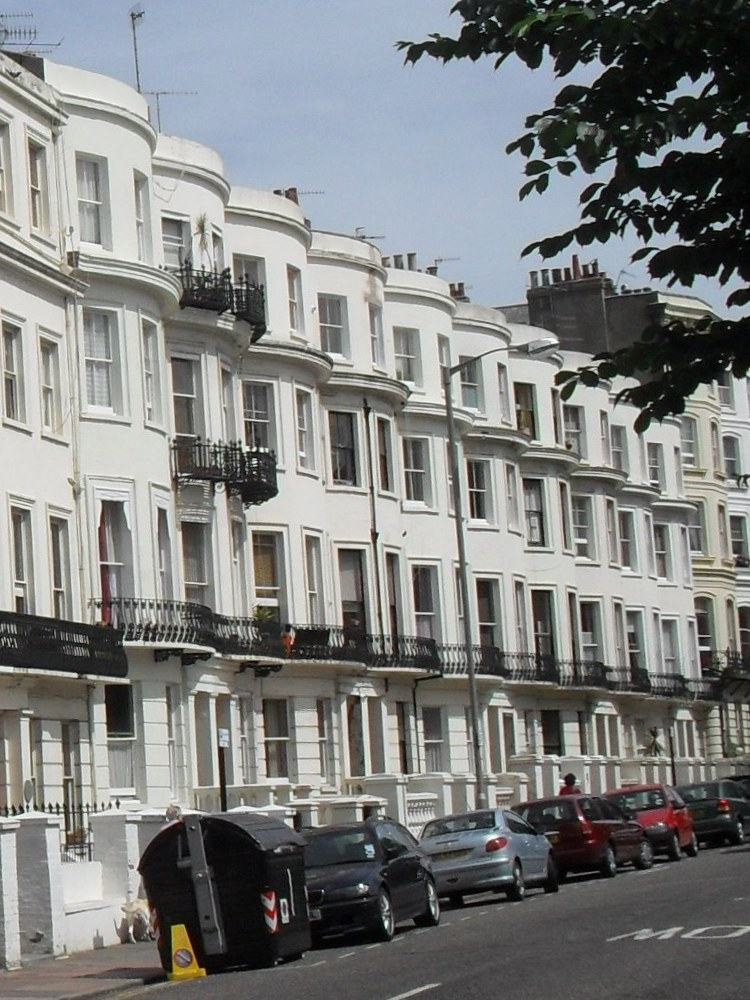
The bow-fronted houses at 7–16 Vernon Terrace were finished in 1857.

Helped by royal patronage (particularly from the Prince Regent) and good transport links to London and other important towns, Brighton grew rapidly in the early 19th century, and high-class suburbs were laid out. The completion in 1841 of the main railway line from London provided a further stimulus. By this time, Church Hill—ideally situated close to the sea and the town's main attractions, largely undeveloped and with a pleasant southwesterly aspect—was developing as a high-class residential area called Montpelier. Montpelier Road was laid out from 1820 as a major road running from the seafront to the Ditchling Road, past the house built in 1819 for the late Thomas Kemp's son Thomas Read Kemp—who had become the main landowner in the area by inheriting his father's land.

Just north of Kemp's house was a large nursery and market garden owned by Parsons and Sons, described at the time as "well-known florists on the Western Road". The gardens were opposite Montpelier Crescent, a South Downs-facing development built between 1843 and 1847. In 1856, a trade directory stated that 16 houses had been built on the west side of the former Montpelier Road, which by that time had been renamed along most of its length: the stretch opposite Montpelier Crescent had been called Vernon Terrace. Not all houses had residents at that stage, and four were in use as schools: numbers 7, 13, 15 and 16. (Mid 19th-century Brighton was well known for its large number of educational establishments, especially boarding schools: it was sometimes nicknamed "School Town".)

The terrace was added to in the early 1860s when more houses were built to the north as far as the junction with Goldsmid Road, where a slightly older house (now numbered as 37 Vernon Terrace) already stood. This junction was remodelled in the late 19th century and became Seven Dials, a major roundabout where seven roads meet. By 1876, when the area was mapped by the Ordnance Survey, almost all of the formerly agricultural land of Church Hill had been built upon; but some fields remained immediately behind Vernon Terrace. This was filled in during the 1890s when the Edwardian-style red-brick houses of Vernon Gardens were built.

Notable residents of Vernon Terrace have included Eleanor Marx, daughter of Karl Marx, who lived at number 6 during the 1870s. By the early 21st century, all of the houses had become multiple-occupancy flats, but their modest front gardens survive.

== Heritage ==
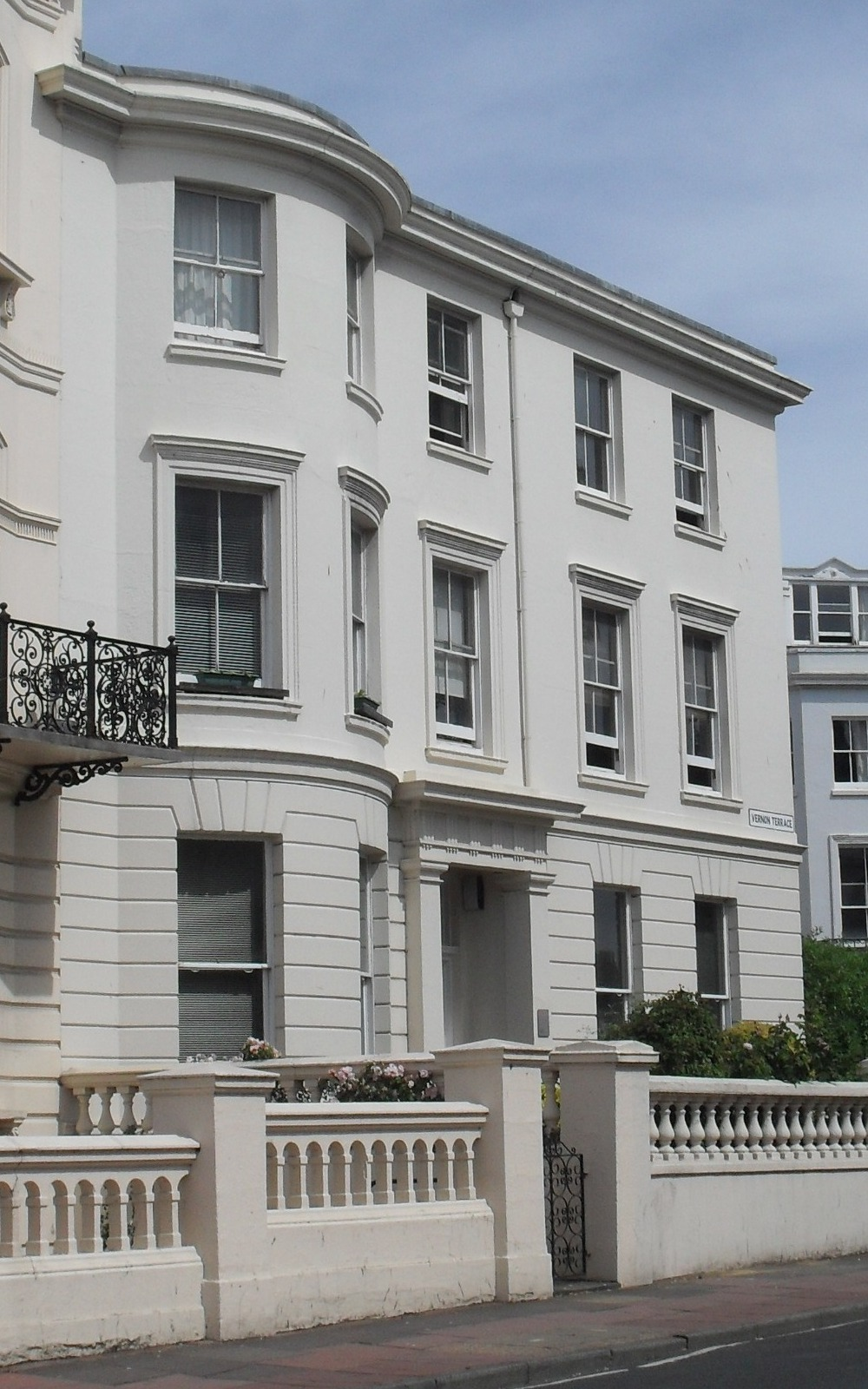
37 Vernon Terrace stands next to Seven Dials.

Three parts of Vernon Terrace have been listed at Grade II by English Heritage. This status is awarded to "nationally important" buildings of "special interest"; as of February 2001 they made up three of 1,124 such buildings in the city. Numbers 1–6 and 7–16 were listed on 20 August 1971; number 37, at the north end of the terrace, was listed on 26 August 1999. Numbers 17 to 36 inclusive are not listed.

Vernon Terrace forms part of the 75.4 acres (30.5 ha) Montpelier & Clifton Hill Conservation Area, one of 34 conservation areas in the city of Brighton and Hove. This area was designated by the council in 1973. Brighton & Hove City Council's report on the area's character states that Vernon Terrace is "an imposing terrace of houses" which together with Montpelier Crescent "form[s] a townscape of outstanding quality". Vernon Terrace is immediately opposite the crescent; its construction meant that Montpelier Crescent's previously uninterrupted views of the South Downs were permanently blocked.

== Architecture ==
The houses at the south end of the terrace (1–6) date from between 1856 and 1857, and those at numbers 7–16 are contemporary. Numbers 1, 6 and 7–16 rise to four storeys; the other houses have only three. All are stucco-clad and have cast iron balconies at first-floor level. The end house, number 1, has a two-window range and an entrance in Windlesham Avenue (with a three-storey canted bay window next to it. Numbers 2–6 each have three windows to each storey, but other differences include the detailing of the entrance porches: there are various combinations of single or double entablatures, pilasters, architraves and rustication, and the placement of the porches also varies. Continuous rustication spans all six ground-floor walls, though. Some windows are set in moulded architraves with pediments of various designs. A cornice runs above the top floor, but is not continuous and changes in style from flat to modillion. At numbers 7–16, standard features include straight-headed entrance porches, ground-floor rustication, three windows to each storey, many set in architraves with decorative moulding, and a continuous cornice and parapet. Number 8 has extra balconies at second- and third-floor level.

The unlisted houses at 17–36 have simple canted façades with sash windows. They date from the 1860s. At the north end, 37 Vernon Terrace is an older house (dating from 1850 or earlier) which was incorporated into the terrace. The main five-window façade is on Vernon Terrace, but there are two other elevations facing Seven Dials and Goldsmid Road; these have a canted bay window and architrave-framed windows respectively. The centrally placed entrance is set in an elaborate doorcase with pilasters, an entablature and a Doric frieze with triglyphs. All windows contain original sashes, and those to the first floor are set in architraves. The two bays to the left of the entrance form a full-height bow. Included in the English Heritage listing are the garden walls with a continuous balustrade and square piers at intervals.

== Bibliography ==
- Antram, Nicholas; Morrice, Richard (2008). Brighton and Hove. Pevsner Architectural Guides. London: Yale University Press. ISBN 978-0-300-12661-7.
- Berry, Sue (2005). Georgian Brighton. Chichester: Phillimore & Co. Ltd. ISBN 1-86077-342-7.
- Carder, Timothy (1990). The Encyclopaedia of Brighton. Lewes: East Sussex County Libraries. ISBN 0-86147-315-9.
- Collis, Rose (2010). The New Encyclopaedia of Brighton. (based on the original by Tim Carder) (1st ed.). Brighton: Brighton & Hove Libraries. ISBN 978-0-9564664-0-2.
- Myall, Steve (2008). The Victorian Development of the Clifton, Montpelier and Powis Estates of Brighton. Lewes: Pomegranate Press. ISBN 978-0-9559006-0-0.
- Sampson, Mark (1994). Brighton: History and Guide. Stroud: Alan Sutton Publishing. ISBN 0-7509-0476-3.
- s.n. (1998). A selection of notes on the History of Hove and Brighton including a History of Hove street names and early maps of Hove. Brighton: Brighton & Hove Libraries.
