= Roundhill Crescent =

19th-century housing development in Brighton and Hove

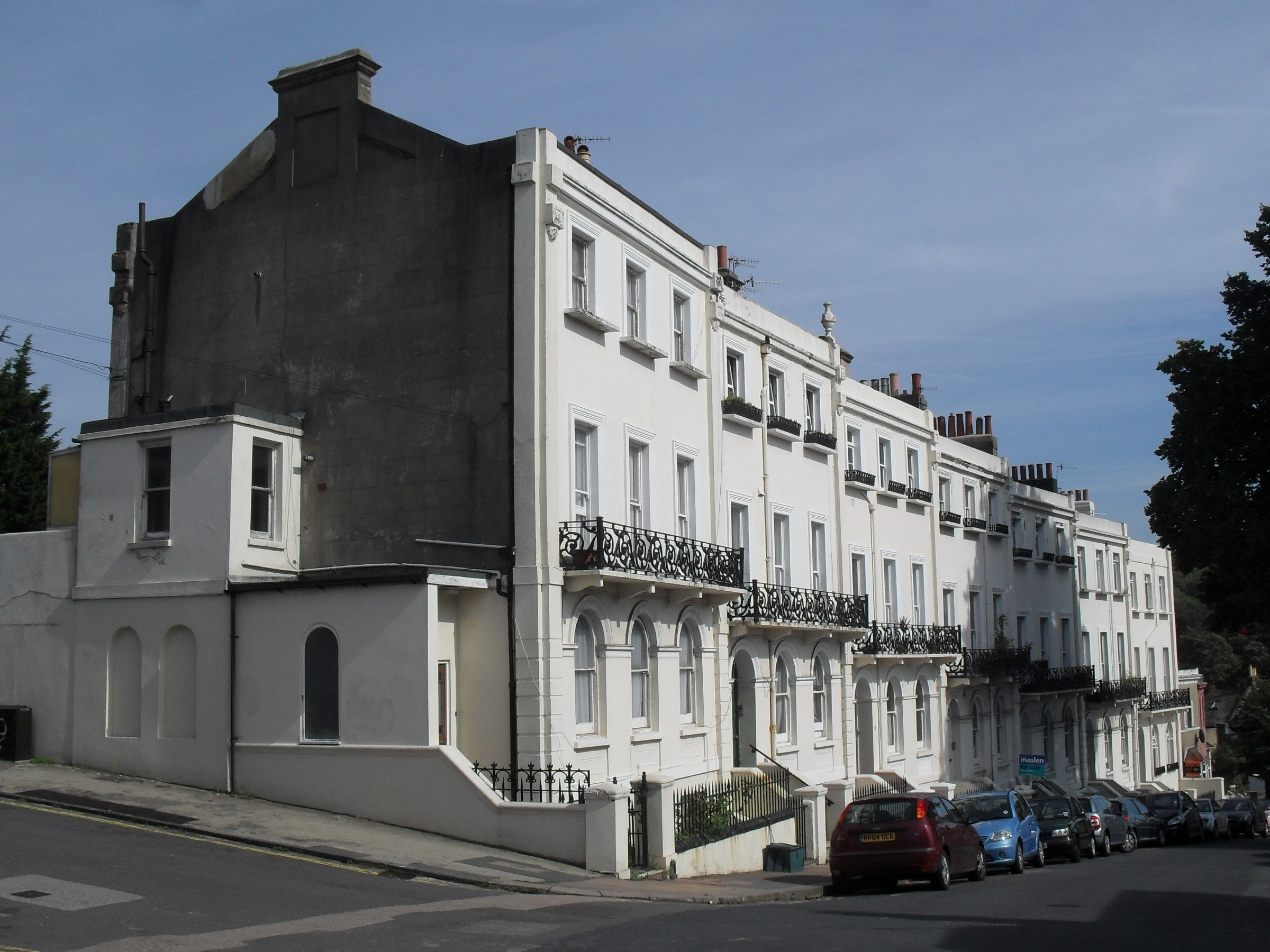
- 101–113 Roundhill Crescent from the west

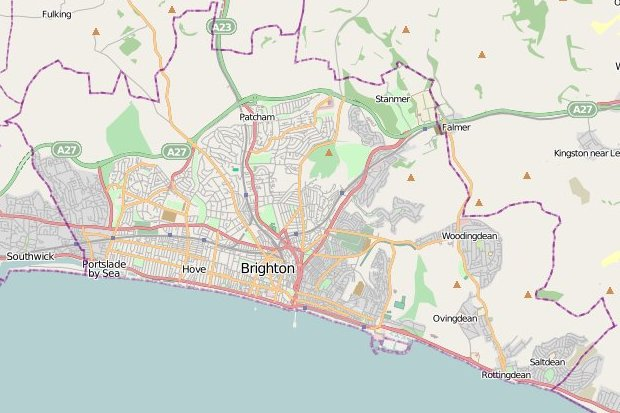
- Location within the city of Brighton and Hove
- 50.8365°N 0.1282°W
- Location: Roundhill Crescent, Round Hill, Brighton and Hove BN2 3FQ/3FR/3GP, United Kingdom

History
- Built: 1865–1885; 141 years ago

Site notes
- Architect: Various
- Architectural style: Regency/Victorian

Listed Building – Grade II
- Official name: 1–13 Roundhill Crescent; 19 and 21 Roundhill Crescent; 23–37 Roundhill Crescent; 69 and 71 Roundhill Crescent; 101–113 Roundhill Crescent
- Designated: 2 March 1981
- Reference no.: 1380833; 1380834; 1380835; 1380836; 1380837

Roundhill Crescent (sometimes spelt Round Hill Crescent) is a late-19th-century housing development in Round Hill, an inner suburb of the English coastal city of Brighton and Hove. Partly developed in the 1860s with large terraced houses on a steeply sloping open hillside, the crescent—which "curves and changes height dramatically along its length"—was finished two decades later and now forms the centrepiece of the Round Hill conservation area. Smaller houses completed the composition in the 1880s, and England's first hospital for the treatment of mental illness was founded in the crescent in 1905. The five original sets of houses from the 1860s have been listed at Grade II by English Heritage for their architectural and historical importance, and the crescent occupies a prominent place on Brighton's skyline. Eugène von Rothschild is said to have briefly lived on the road in the late 1960s, as well as the band Throbbing Gristle.

== History ==
Brighton was originally a fishing village on the English Channel coast, with the chalk hills of the South Downs rising immediately behind. Its growth into a fashionable seaside resort and residential town began in the mid-19th century and continued, with some interruptions, for more than a century afterwards. The construction of railway lines to London and Lewes in the 1840s stimulated development on the higher ground behind the core of the old town.

Round Hill was a high, mostly undeveloped hill between the two valleys along which the main road and railway routes ran. Topped with a windmill since 1838, the only other development until the 1860s consisted of a few middle-class villas and the horseshoe-shaped Park Crescent at the bottom of the southern slope. This prestigious scheme was one of the last executed by prolific local architect Amon Henry Wilds. The opening of the railway led to the rapid construction of lower-class housing in the surrounding area, but the example set by Park Crescent encouraged developers to continue to introduce higher-quality, larger-scale residential schemes. The crescent form had been popular in Brighton and nearby Hove throughout the 19th century; Wilds's work represented the most recent example of the style already established at Adelaide, Hanover, Lewes, Montpelier and the pioneering Royal Crescents.

The arable land of the higher parts of the hill, mostly owned by Thomas Read Kemp and the Stanford family, was released for development in the 1860s. Kemp sold his land, but the Stanfords sought to develop their parts according to their own taste. They took inspiration from the high-class housing of Hanover Crescent (built between 1814 and 1823) and the mid-1850s terraced villas of Powis Square. In 1865, a crescent-shaped road was laid out on high ground on the northwest side of Upper Lewes Road, and several groups of large three- and four-storey terraced houses were built. They were "post-Regency" in character, showing the evolution away from Regency-style features popular throughout 19th-century Brighton and the adoption of some Italianate detailing. The gaps were filled in between 1880 and 1885 when smaller terraced houses, mostly of two storeys and featuring the canted bay windows and decorative mouldings characteristic of Brighton's Victorian residential architecture, were built. Although building plots were mostly developed individually by small-scale builders, the Stanford family stipulated the general layout and appearance of the houses; builders could work to their own designs, but only within these limitations. The later houses were mostly built of cheap brick or bungaroosh—a low-quality composite material—which was then faced with protective render.

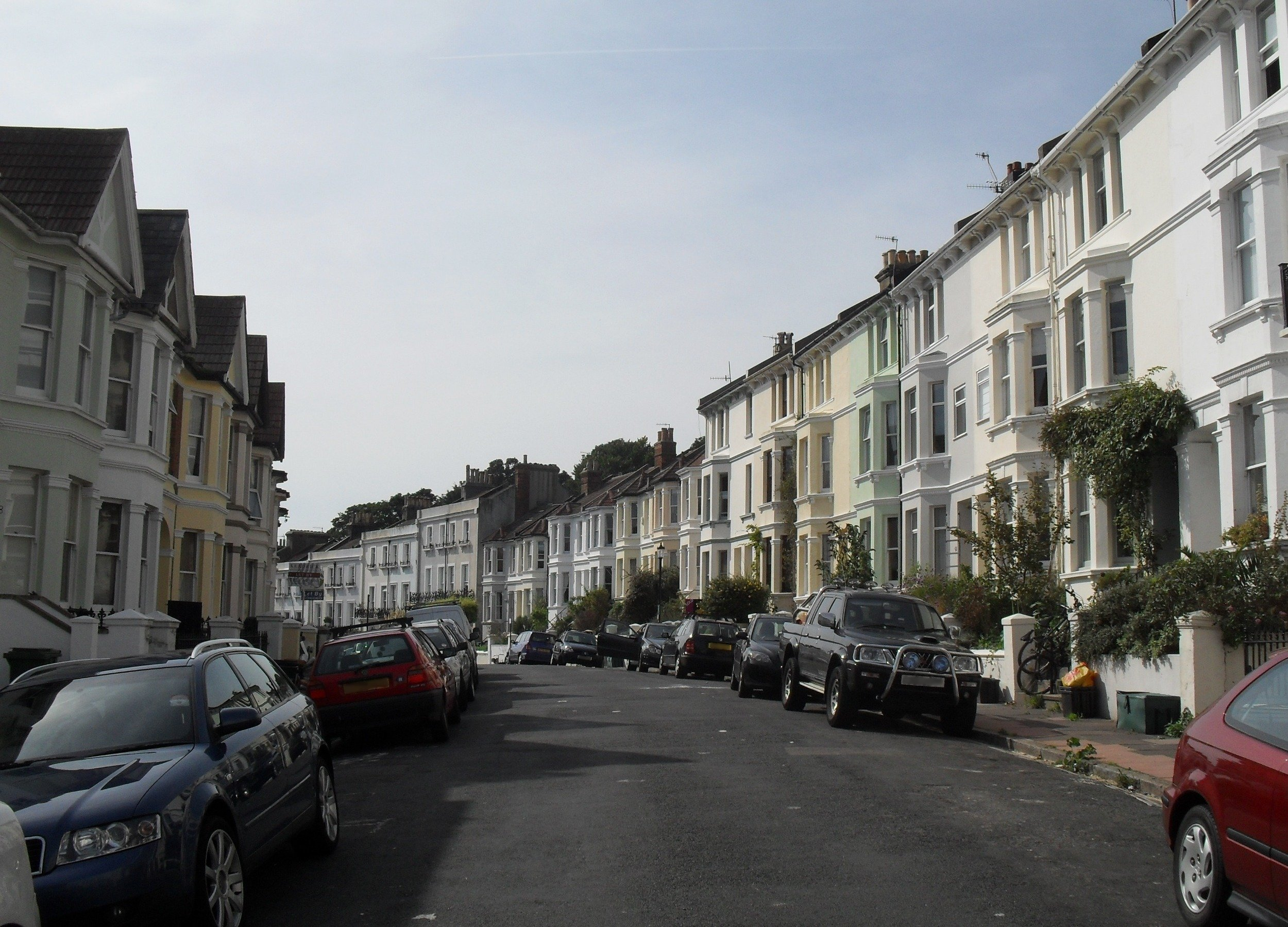
A general view of Roundhill Crescent looking west

For six years in the early 20th century, one of the original 1860s houses was the site of a pioneering centre for the provision of mental healthcare. In 1905, number 101 was rented by Dr Helen Boyle, who had founded a dispensary in the nearby suburb of Hanover in 1899. She moved the dispensary to Roundhill Crescent and opened a 12-bed hospital alongside it, for the treatment of women and children with mental health problems. Named the Lewes Road Hospital and Dispensary for Women and Children, the facility was England's first hospital for the treatment of mental illness. The conventional practice at the time was to send sufferers of mental health problems to lunatic asylums rather than offer medical care. The facility moved to nearby Ditchling Road in 1911, then moved elsewhere in Brighton as it expanded further.

The five parts of Roundhill Crescent that were built in the 1860s were separately listed at Grade II by English Heritage on 2 March 1981. This status is given to "nationally important buildings of special interest". As of February 2001, they represented five of the 1,124 Grade II-listed buildings and structures, and 1,218 listed buildings of all grades, in the city of Brighton and Hove. The crescent also forms a central part (and "the most important architecturally") of the Round Hill conservation area, one of 34 such areas in the city of Brighton and Hove. The 29.78-acre (12.05 ha) area was designated on 6 January 1977.

== Architecture ==
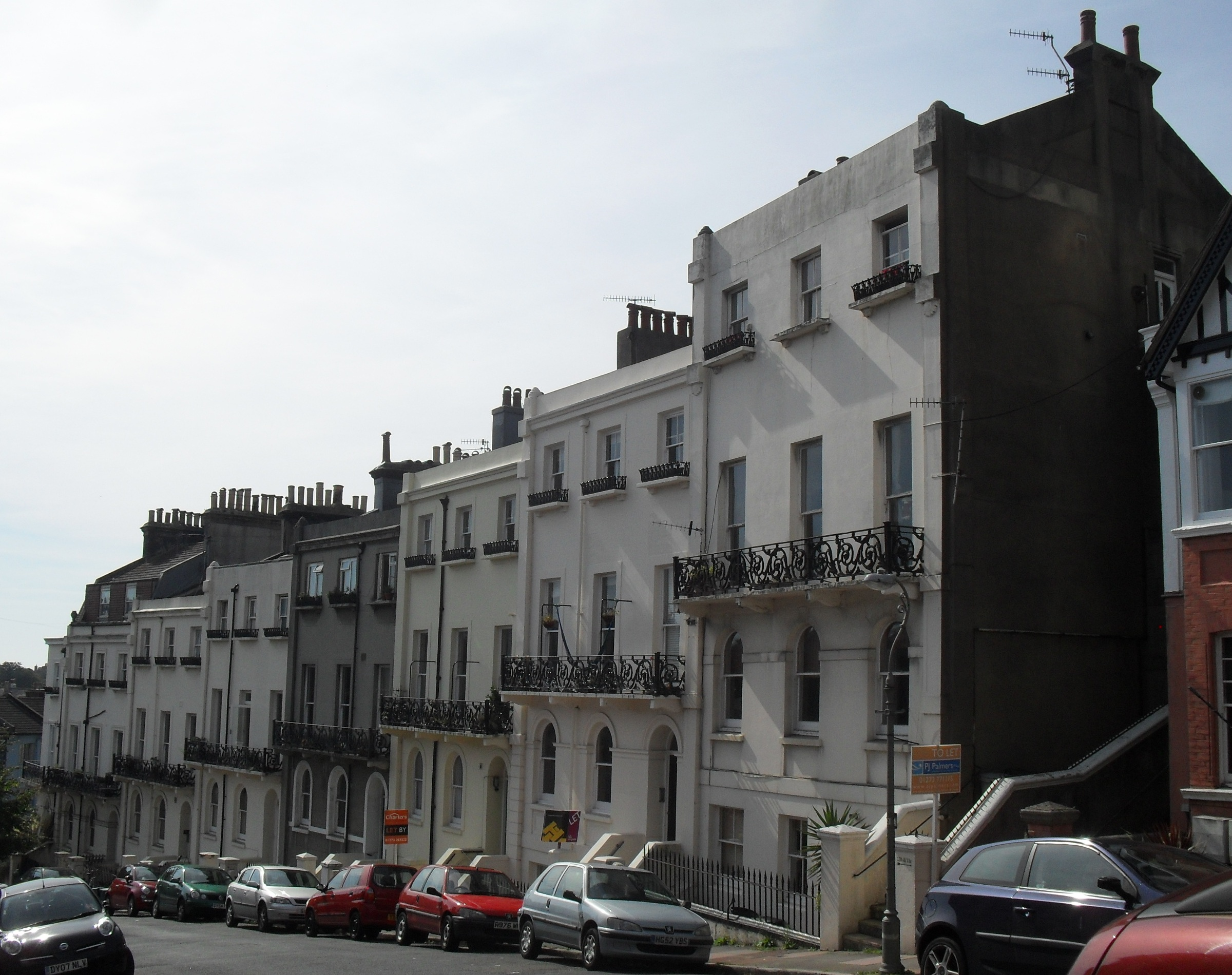
1–13 Roundhill Crescent

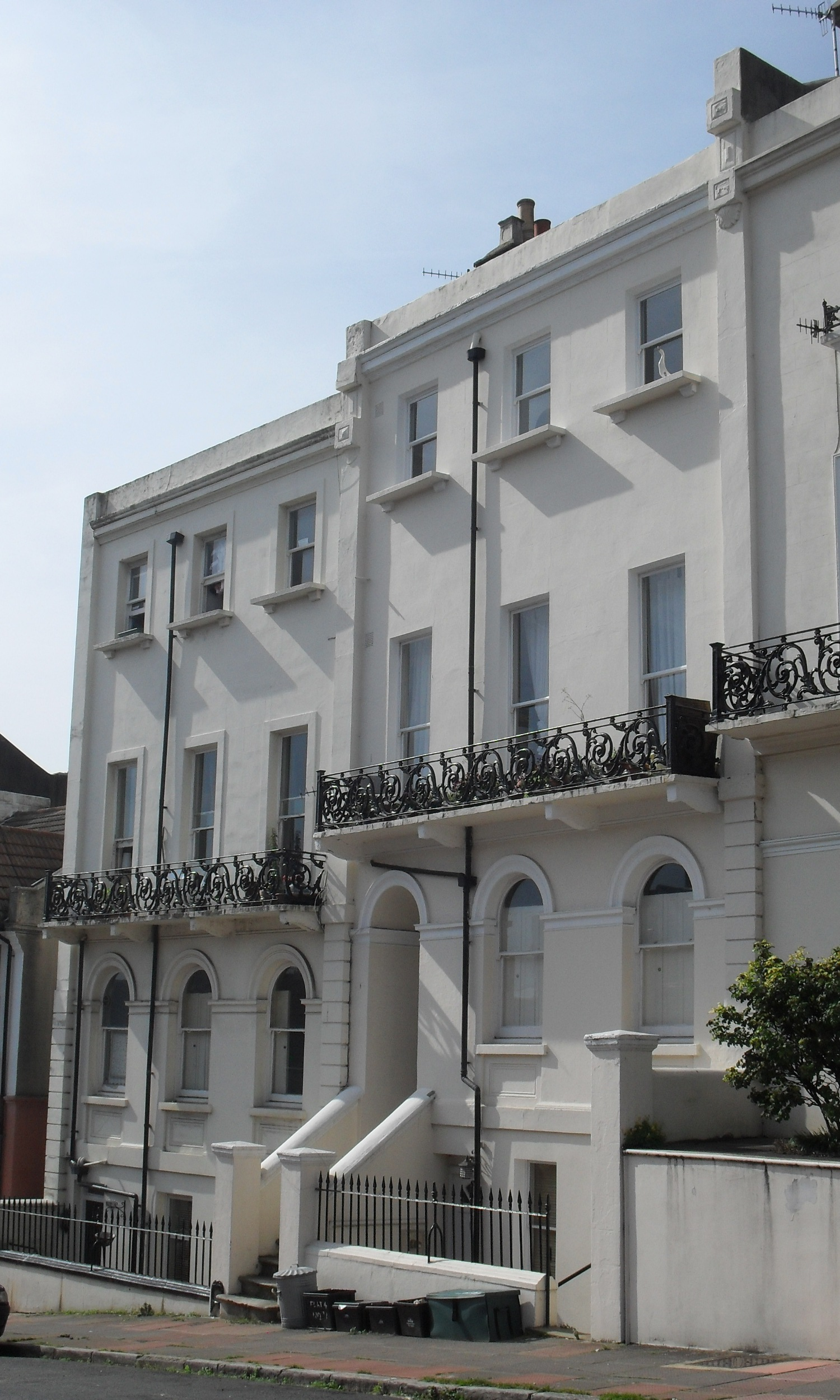
19 and 21 Roundhill Crescent

Roundhill Crescent forms a "majestic sweep" on the steep, visually prominent hillside, which can be seen from many parts of north and east Brighton. The "fine curving terraces of Regency-style houses" at each end of the road, which started the development in 1865, were joined by smaller houses in a more modest, characteristically Victorian style over the next 20 years. The older houses on the crescent stand out in their "attempt [at] a little grandeur in the Regency mould" in an area of otherwise small and unpretentious housing. Coming about 50 years after that architectural style's heyday, they represent its latest appearance in Brighton.

The groups of houses built in the mid-1860s, and now with listed status, are now numbered 1–13, 19 and 21, 23–37, 69 and 71 and 101–113. Only the group between 1 and 19 inclusive and the pair at 69 and 71 appeared on a mid-1870s map of Brighton, but all sources agree that the five sets of houses are of the same date. Numbers 1–13 are at the lowest point on the southwest side, after which the crescent begins to "curve and change height dramatically along its length, rising and then falling steeply again by the time numbers 101–113 are reached. Common features of the houses include stuccoed façades carved to look like ashlar, ornate cast-iron balconies, parapets, sash windows and cast-iron railings separating them from the pavement.

The group at numbers 1–13 rise to three storeys and each have a three-window range. Each house is separated from its neighbour by pilasters running the full height of the building to a cornice. The bottom part of each pilaster is rusticated. The entrance and windows have decorative mouldings to their archivolt and architraves respectively. Each house has a large cast-iron balcony outside the first-floor window and some ironwork at second-floor level, forming guards outside the bracketed windows. Many of the mouldings, except at number 1, are no longer in their original condition. Number 1 also has dormer windows in the roof, and number 13 has a side entrance in an arched porch.

Numbers 19 and 21, originally part of the same terrace, are similar in style. Number 21 has lost much of its exterior decoration: none of the windows have mouldings or cast-iron window guards. Number 19 has an arched side entrance under an architraved porch. The houses at numbers 23–37 are also of the same style, but with two windows on each floor; all retain their original features, but some of the decorative mouldings have been modified on three of the buildings.

Numbers 69 and 71 are again of three storeys with a three-window range, stucco-clad and topped by a cornice and parapet in front of the roof. The treatment of the top of the dividing pilaster on number 71 is different: it lacks a bracket to the cornice. As with the other 1860s houses, they both have first-floor balconies with foliage-pattern ironwork.

The seven houses at numbers 101–113 also have three windows to each of three storeys, and the same general layout and materials. Some details are different on individual houses: there is no rustication to the pilasters at numbers 105 and 107; the cast-iron second-floor window-guards are absent on three houses; some mouldings are altered or absent; one of the pilasters at number 103 is decorated with an urn; and number 101's entrance is in a porch at the side.

The non-listed houses on the northwest side are mostly of the same height but lack many of the features shared by the listed buildings, in particular the "highly decorative" balconies. Eaves supported on brackets take the place of parapets as well. The southeast side of the crescent has two-storey houses with some variation in style. Many have lost their original slate roofs, but some 19th-century dormer windows have been retained. The insertion of modern exterior features such as replacement doors, windows and roofs has been restricted by an Article Four Direction, covering the whole Round Hill conservation area, since 2000.

== See also ==
- List of conservation areas in Brighton and Hove
