= Brighton Forum =

Building

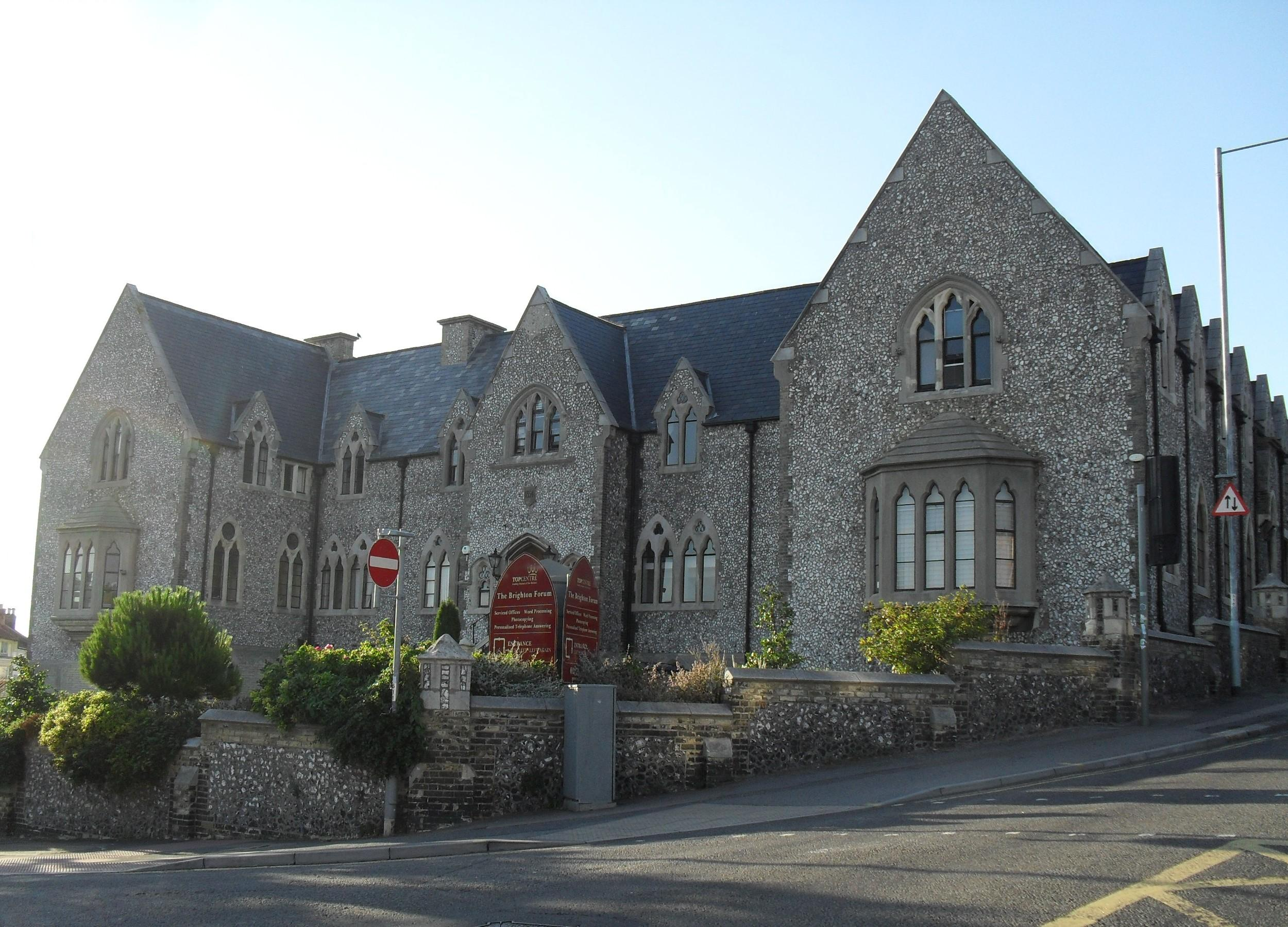
- The building from the southeast

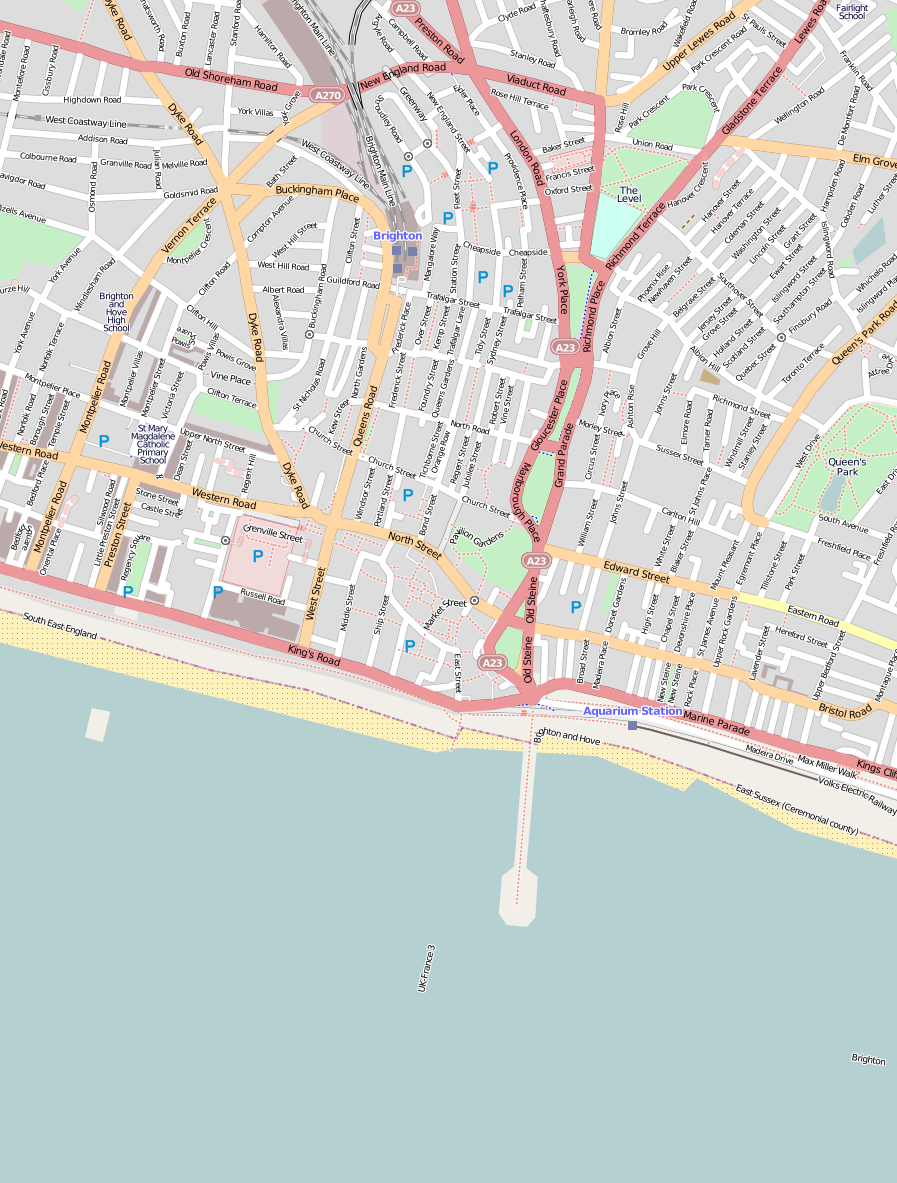
- Location within central Brighton
- 50.8332°N 0.1345°W
- Location: 95 Ditchling Road, Round Hill, Brighton, Brighton and Hove BN1 4ST, United Kingdom

History
- Built: 1854
- Built for: Diocese of Chichester

Site notes
- Architect(s): William and Edward Habershon
- Architectural style: Gothic Revival
- Restored: 1987

Listed Building – Grade II
- Official name: Brighton Business Centre
- Designated: 22 March 1988
- Reference no.: 1380440

Citibase Brighton (previously known as The Brighton Forum by Topcentre) is a complex of serviced offices on a prominent elevated position in the Round Hill area of Brighton, part of the English city of Brighton and Hove. The large Gothic Revival building, by two architect brothers from London, has had three greatly different uses since its construction at the edge of Brighton parish in 1854: for its first 85 years, it trained Anglican schoolmistresses; then it became a military base and records office; and in 1988 it opened as a multipurpose business centre and office complex. The elaborate flint exterior is finely detailed in the Gothic style, especially around the windows. English Heritage has listed it at Grade II for its architectural and historical importance.

== History ==
The ancient Sussex fishing village of Brighthelmston, which in the 18th and 19th centuries developed into the fashionable seaside resort of Brighton, lay within the Anglican Diocese of Chichester. In the 19th century, before the Elementary Education Act 1870 centralised the provision of primary-level education and established school boards, most 5- to 12-year-olds were taught (if at all) at schools founded and sponsored by charities, private benefactors or churches. There were many such church schools in Brighton: Anglican churches with their own schools included Christ Church, St Bartholomew's, St John the Evangelist's, St Mark's, St Martin's, St Paul's and St Stephen's.

The Diocese established an institute to train female schoolteachers for the Anglican schools in Brighton and the rest of Sussex in Black Lion Street in The Lanes (the ancient heart of the town) in April 1842. This was done in association with the National Society for the Education of the Poor in the Principles of the Established Church. More space was soon needed, so in 1854 it found a site on the west side of Ditchling Road on which to build a larger college. Ditchling Road, which ran across Ditchling Beacon to Ditchling village and then on to Cuckfield and eventually London, became a turnpike in 1770 and was thereafter one of the main north–south routes into and out of Brighton. The chosen site was on the north side of Viaduct Road, which was built to link Ditchling and London Roads and which formed the northern edge of Brighton's ecclesiastical parish and municipal borough until 1873.

The architects William and Edward Habershon were commissioned to design the new building. They were based in London but worked extensively in Sussex; buildings they designed separately or together in the county include St Leonards-on-Sea Congregational Church, St John the Baptist's Church in Hove, St Helen's Church in Ore and St Augustine's Church at Scaynes Hill. They started work at the large corner site in 1854, and the building was ready later that year. The local firm of Edmund Scott and F.T. Cawthorn extended the building to the rear (north side) in 1886.

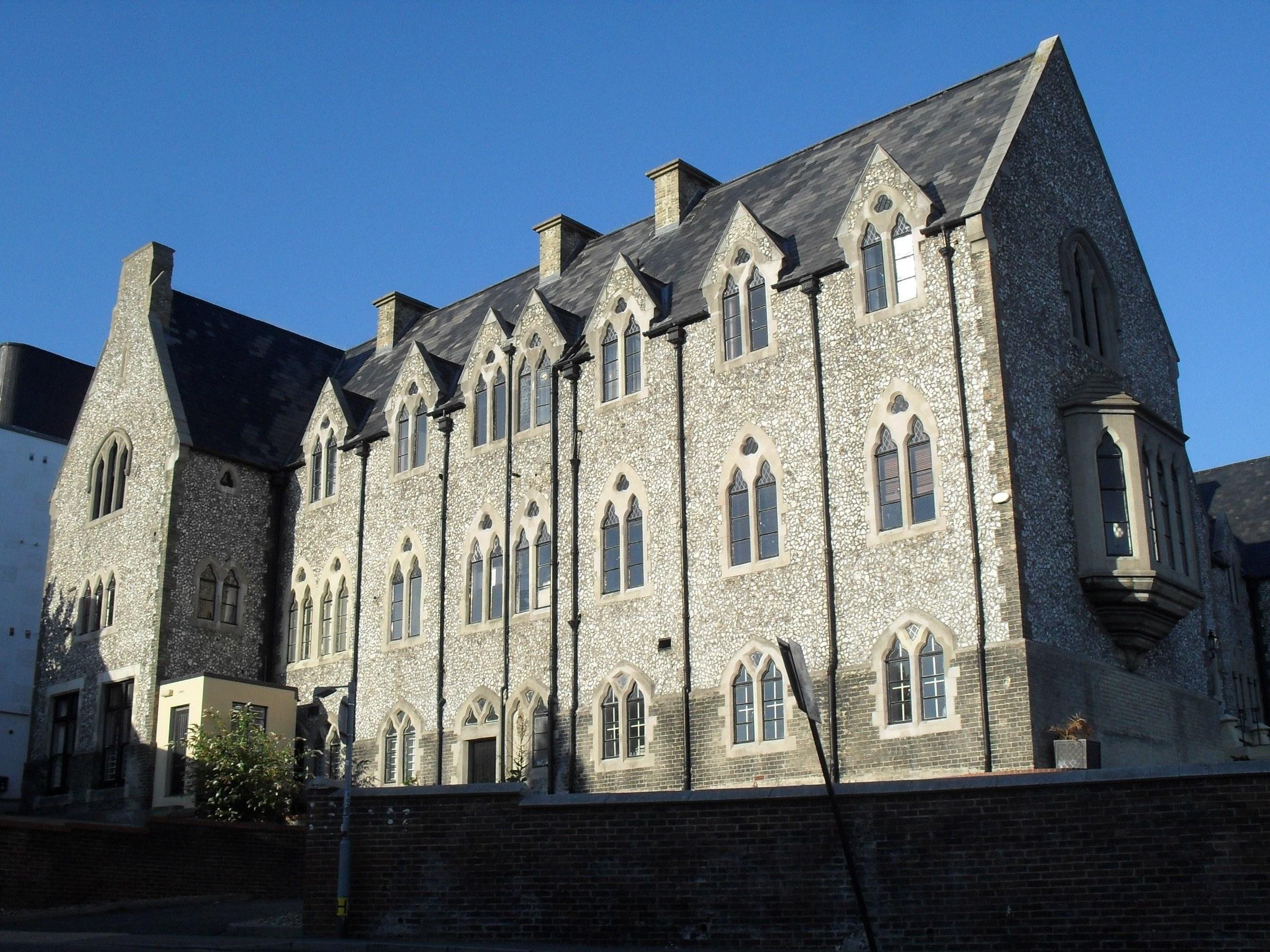
The west elevation, showing paired lancet windows rising beyond the roofline

Teachers continued to be trained at the college (officially called the Chichester Diocesan Training College for Schoolmistresses) until 1939. As World War II approached, the institution closed and the building was auctioned; but before it could be sold, the Royal Engineers requisitioned it for their use during wartime. They used it as a base for their operations, then after the war it became their archives and records office. In 1987, they moved out, and the vacant building was threatened with demolition. A local campaign helped it receive listed status, offering a degree of protection, and the building's future was secured when it was bought and converted into a complex of serviced offices. It opened in November 1988 as the Brighton Business Centre, and was later renamed the Brighton Forum.

The Brighton Forum was listed at Grade II by English Heritage on 22 March 1988. This status is given to "nationally important buildings of special interest". As of February 2001, it was one of 1,124 Grade II-listed buildings and structures, and 1,218 listed buildings of all grades, in the city of Brighton and Hove.

== Architecture ==
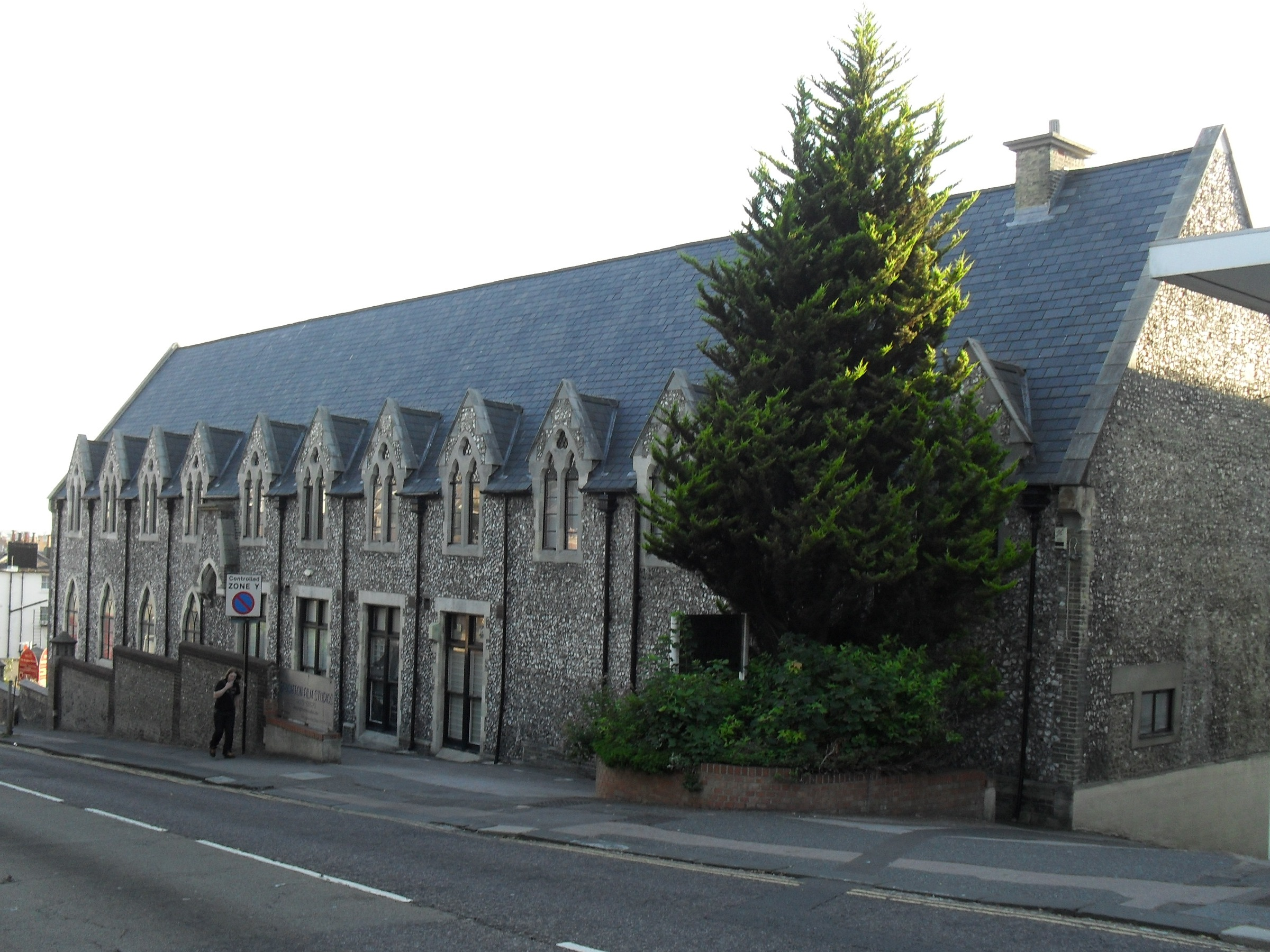
The east elevation; the carriage arch is hidden behind the tree

Brighton Forum is built on a high, prominent corner position, giving it good visibility from the west and south and long southward views. Knapped flint is the main building material, augmented by stone dressings and some yellow brickwork to the quoins. The roof is laid with tiles.

The two-storey façade to Viaduct Road is E-shaped and regular, with a symmetrical seven-bay plan. The first and seventh bays project further forward than the centre (fourth) bay, which is formed by an elevated entrance porch. This has lancet windows on the sides, grouped under single hood moulds and with a string course. The doorway is under a segmental arch which is topped by a gable. The rest of the ground floor has larger lancets arranged in pairs and with a small trefoil above. The south-facing walls have two pairs together, while on the inward-facing walls of the first and seventh bays there are two sets of paired windows placed some distance apart. At first-floor level, similar paired lancets and trefoils rise as gabled dormers above the roofline. The south walls of the first and seventh bays have prominent five-light oriel windows, canted to form a 1–3–1 pattern of trefoil-headed panes. These oriel windows are supported on ornate corbels. Above these at first-floor level, and also above the entrance porch, there are three-light trefoil-headed windows set under a segmental arch-shaped hood mould. Many of the windows on the south side have plate tracery.

The eastern face (to Ditchling Road) has eight bays and a carriage arch at the north end. The first four bays have trefoil-headed lancet windows, while the next four have simpler straight-headed windows. The carriage arch is segmental-headed. The first floor has eight dormers. On the west side, the roof is cross-gabled: the gables are parallel to, rather than perpendicular to, the ridge.

== See also ==
- Media related to 95 Ditchling Road, Brighton at Wikimedia Commons
- Grade II listed buildings in Brighton and Hove: A–B

== Bibliography ==
- Antram, Nicholas; Morrice, Richard (2008). Brighton and Hove. Pevsner Architectural Guides. London: Yale University Press. ISBN 978-0-300-12661-7.
- Carder, Timothy (1990). The Encyclopaedia of Brighton. Lewes: East Sussex County Libraries. ISBN 0-86147-315-9.
- Collis, Rose (2010). The New Encyclopaedia of Brighton. (based on the original by Tim Carder) (1st ed.). Brighton: Brighton & Hove Libraries. ISBN 978-0-9564664-0-2.
- Fines, Ken (2002). A History of Brighton & Hove. Chichester: Phillimore & Co. ISBN 1-86077-231-5.
- Nairn, Ian; Pevsner, Nikolaus (1965). The Buildings of England: Sussex. Harmondsworth: Penguin Books. ISBN 0-14-071028-0.
