= Round Hill, Brighton =

Inner suburban area in Brighton, UK

Coordinates: 50.8359°N 0.1298°W

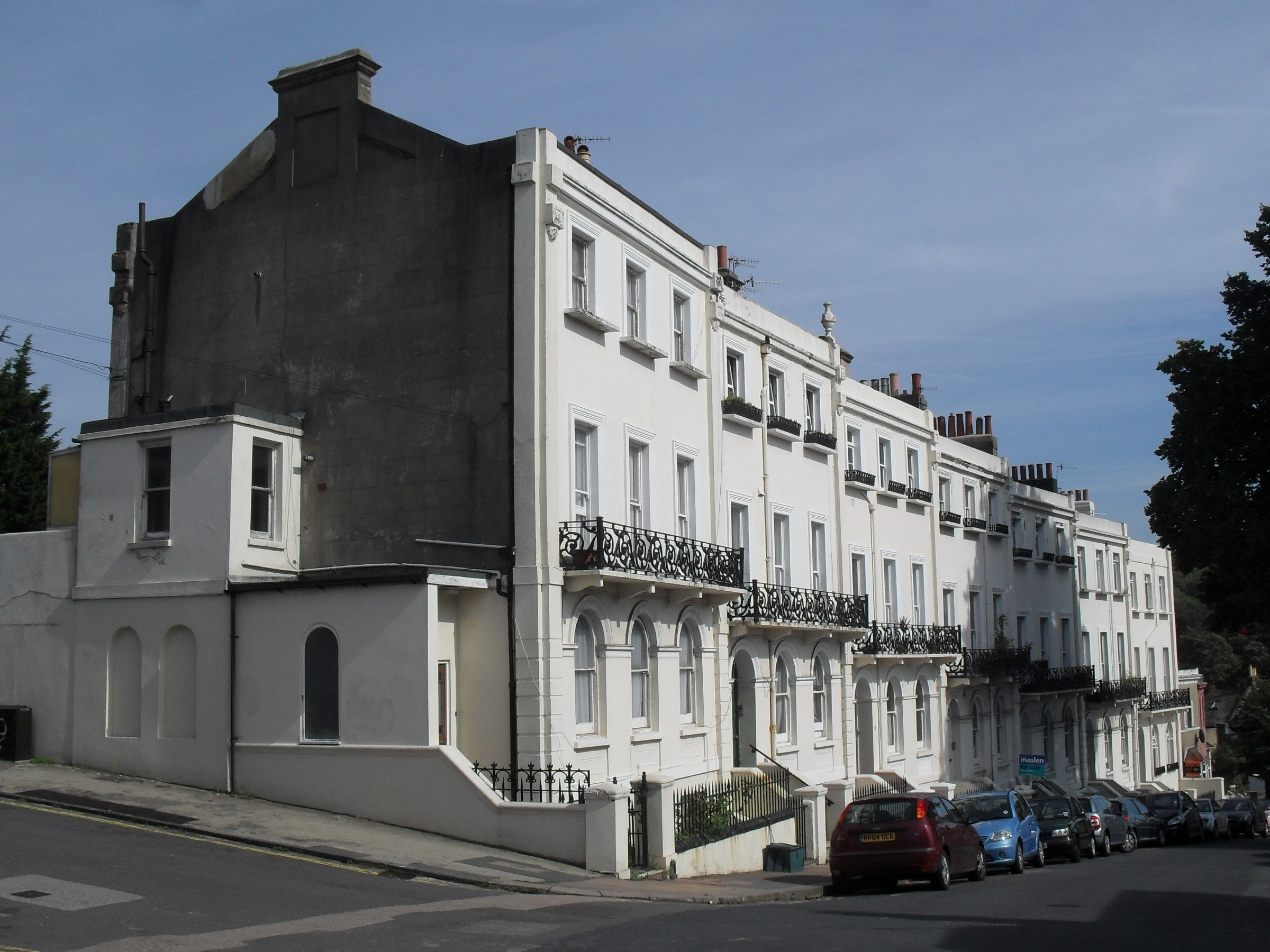
Roundhill Crescent (numbers 101–113 pictured) forms the architectural centrepiece of the suburb of Round Hill.

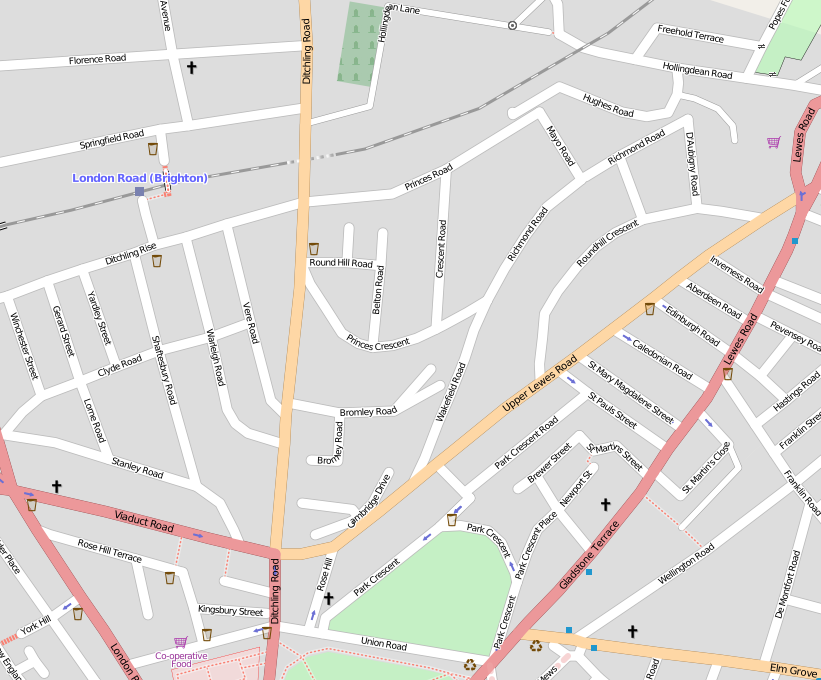
Round Hill covers the area between the Lewes, Ditchling and London Roads north of Brighton city centre.

Round Hill (sometimes spelt Roundhill) is an inner suburban area of Brighton, part of the coastal city of Brighton and Hove in England. The area contains a mix of privately owned and privately rented terraced housing, much of which has been converted for multiple occupancies, and small-scale commercial development. It was developed mostly in the late 19th century on an area of high land overlooking central Brighton and with good views in all directions, the area became a desirable middle-class suburb—particularly the large terraced houses of Roundhill Crescent and Richmond Road, and the exclusive Park Crescent—and within a few decades the whole of the hill had been built up with smaller terraces and some large villas.

Non-residential buildings include the landmark St Martin's Church, Brighton's largest place of worship, with its dramatically extravagant interior; the Brighton Forum, a Gothic Revival former college now in commercial use; Brighton's main fire station; and the oldest working cinema in Britain. The first hospital in England catering for mental illness was established in a house in Roundhill Crescent in 1905. Brighton's first Jewish cemetery, although a short distance outside Round Hill according to Brighton & Hove City Council's definition, has been associated with the suburb throughout its nearly 200-year history. The London Road viaduct, a distinctive, sweeping piece of railway architecture, forms the northern boundary of the area and "a literal gateway" between outer and inner suburbia. All of these buildings have been listed by English Heritage for their architectural and historical importance, and the core of Round Hill, around Roundhill Crescent, is one of 34 conservation areas in the city. Round Hill's steep slopes and road layout encouraged the introduction of another feature which gives the area its character: the "cat's-creep" staircase. The area has good tree cover and increasingly heavy traffic along the three main roads which run through the area.

Past features of Round Hill include a windmill, which took advantage of the windy conditions on the 223-foot (68 m) hilltop until 1913; 19th-century laundries, which sought the same advantage; early 19th-century pleasure gardens, now occupied by the houses of Park Crescent; the landmark Cox's Pill Factory, demolished in the 1980s; glasshouses and smallholdings, some of which survived until after the Second World War despite being surrounded by houses; and the Kemp Town branch line, a passenger and freight railway which cut through the area and had a short-lived station serving Round Hill. The former St Saviour's Church survived until 1983, and a Congregational church elsewhere in the suburb closed but retained its façade after its conversion into housing.

== Location ==
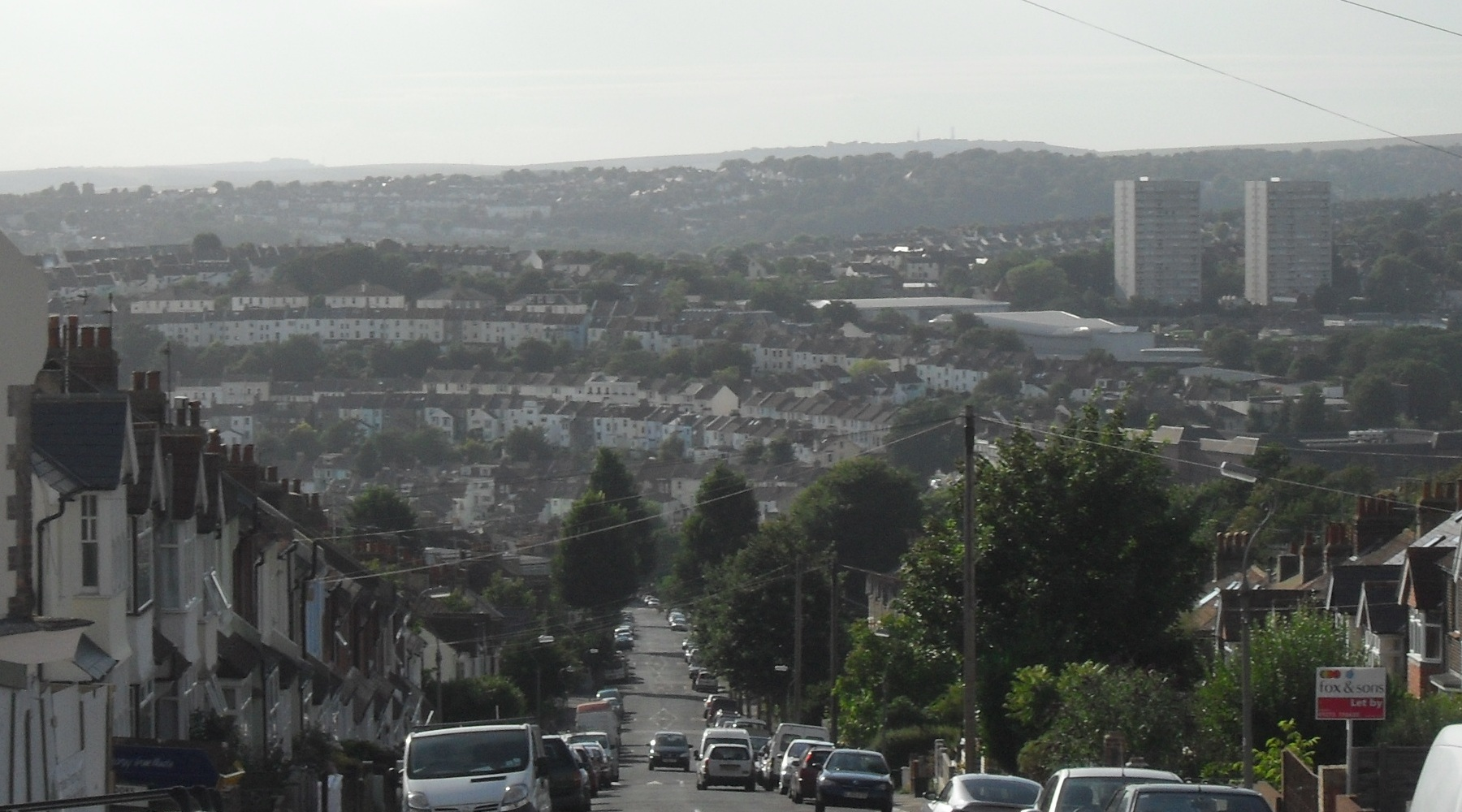
There are long views into Round Hill, especially from the east and southeast (view from the top of Hartington Road pictured).

Round Hill is an approximately triangular area directly north of Brighton city centre. The name is now applied to a wider area than the 223-foot (68 m) hill at its centre; its boundaries are now defined as Union Road and The Level (a large area of open ground) to the south, the main London Road to the west, the East Coastway railway line to the north—including the London Road viaduct and London Road railway station—and the Lewes Road to the east. Ditchling Road, a third main road, runs through the centre of the suburb. The large, round-topped hill which gave the suburb its name stands between the two main valleys along which the original routes into and out of Brighton developed (the present London and Lewes Roads). Ditchling Road, the middle route, climbs the hill. London and Lewes Roads became turnpikes (toll roads) in 1770, and The Level—originally common land between Ditchling Road and Lewes Road—was enclosed and reserved for public recreation in 1822.

Round Hill's elevated, fairly central position gives excellent inward and outward views. To the northeast, the South Downs can be seen; long views of the English Channel are possible to the south, beyond the city centre and St Peter's Church; to the southeast, Elm Grove, Race Hill and Brighton General Hospital can be seen on high ground beyond the Lewes Road valley; and to the west, Preston Park (the city's oldest and largest public park) can be seen. Crescent and Wakefield Roads have long southward views towards the city centre, as do the small blocks of flats which replaced some large villas in the middle of the suburb. The tall viaduct is the main landmark to the west and north. There are clear views into Round Hill from many parts of Brighton, especially areas to the east and southeast such as Race Hill.

When the railway line was built between Brighton and Lewes in 1846, the northern slope of Round Hill was effectively severed from the rest of the area. It developed separately as an industrial area and the site of many Brighton Corporation utilities: the Brighton Dust Destructor, an incinerator for rubbish, was built in 1866, followed by another incinerator in 1898; the Municipal Abattoir was established in 1894; and in the early 20th century a meat market and a municipal cleansing station for the fumigation and delousing of people and property were built nearby. Although they occupy land that was part of the hill, these buildings were considered to be part of neighbouring Hollingdean. Residents of Round Hill, especially those who owned laundries, often complained about the smell and soot from the incinerators.

== History ==
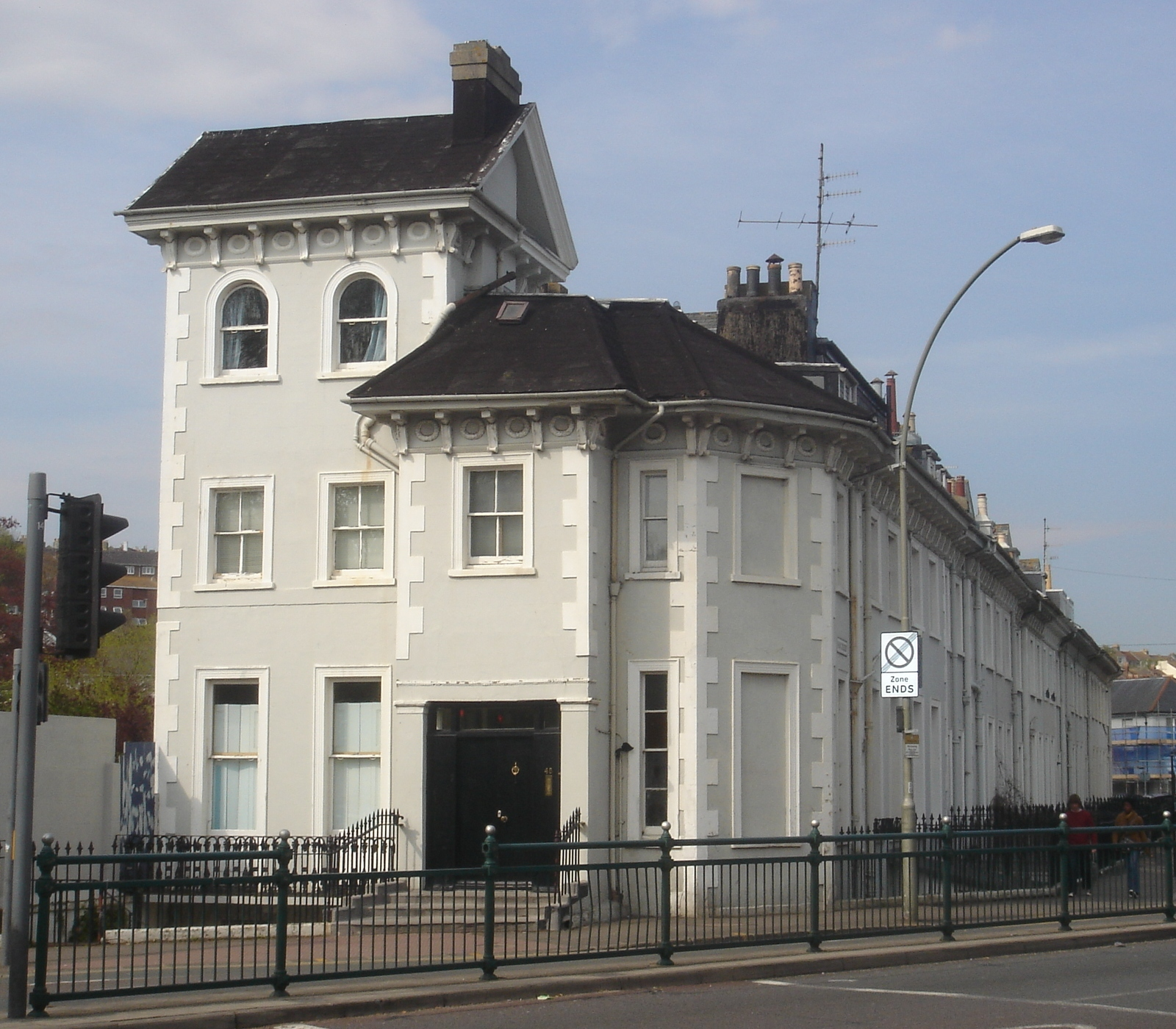
The eastern side of Park Crescent was part of Amon Henry Wilds's prestigious development on the site of Ireland's Pleasure Garden.

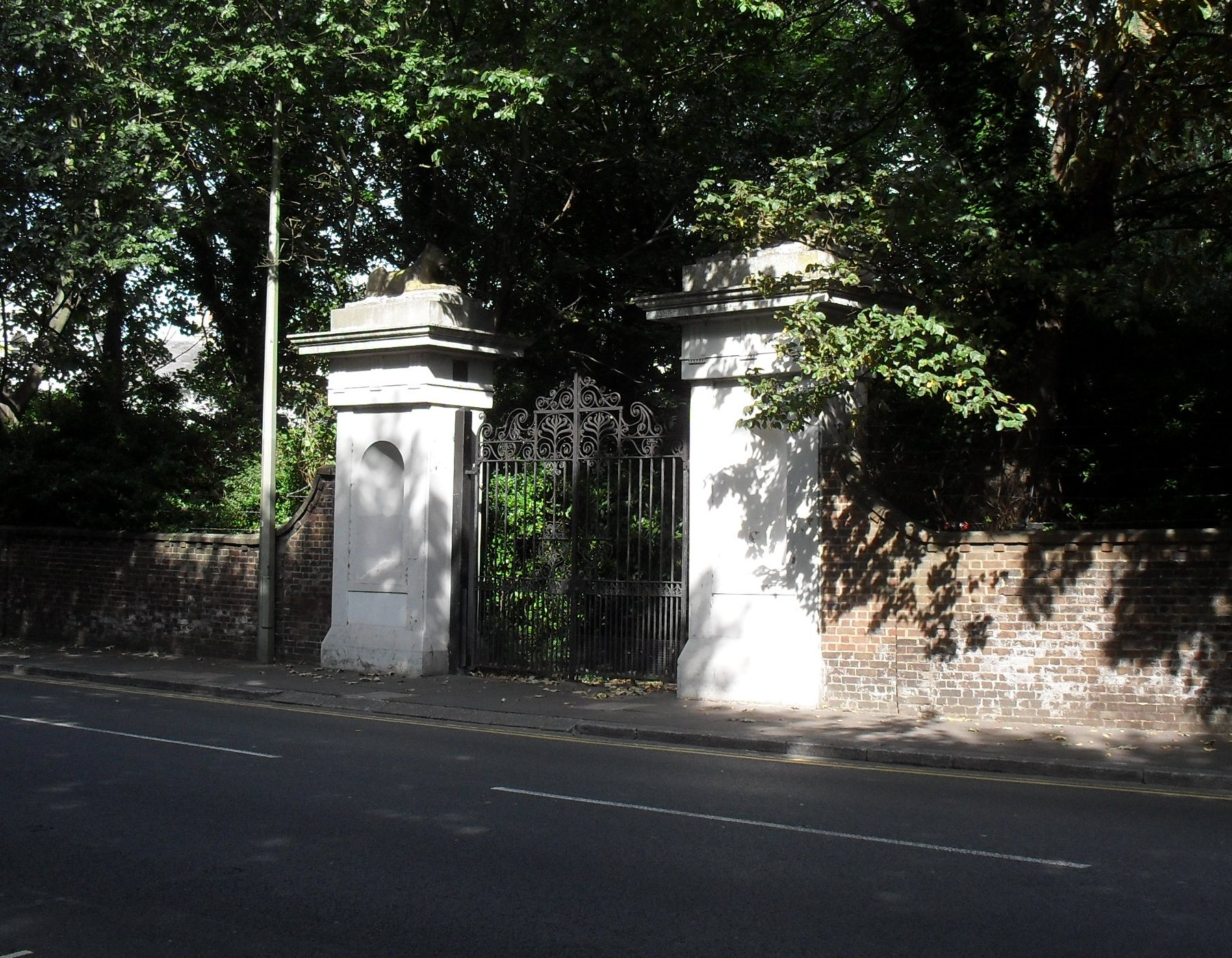
Only the walls and gate piers survive from the ill-fated Pleasure Garden.

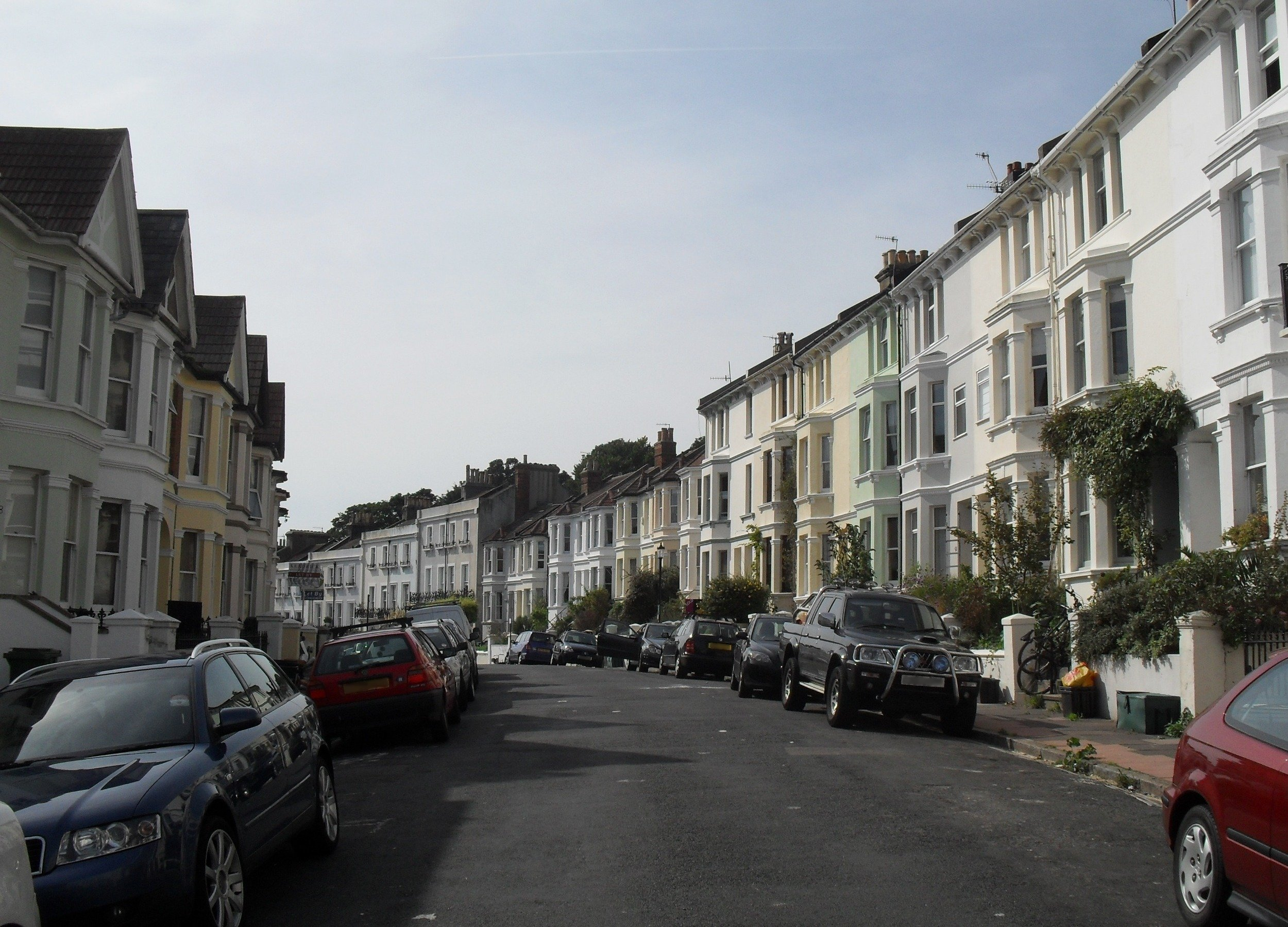
The houses of Roundhill Crescent date from the 1860s and 1880s.

=== Early history ===
In 1800, Round Hill was a steep-sided, round-topped hill rising to 223 feet (68 m) and ploughed up for use by farmers. Some poorly defined tracks crossed it, linking Preston village to the road to Lewes. Two of the largest landowners in the Brighton and Hove area, Thomas Read Kemp and William Stanford (an ancestor of Charles Thomas-Stanford of the Thomas-Stanford Baronetcy of Preston Manor), owned most of the land between them. In the late 19th century, the Stanford family sold some of their land—which almost completely encircled Brighton, Preston and Hove to the north—for housing development, and retained much of it to develop themselves.

The earliest development in the Round Hill area was Ireland's Pleasure Gardens on the southern slope in 1823. Also known as the Royal Pleasure Gardens, this venture by James Ireland was intended to be a profitable speculation, attracting the increasing number of visitors and short-term residents who had doubled Brighton's population in the previous decade. Ireland, a rich businessman with interests in drapery and undertaking, bought a 10-acre (4 ha) site from Thomas Read Kemp in 1822 and opened the gardens on 1 May 1823. The vast range of attractions included an aviary, maze, formal gardens with a canal, Gothic-style tower, bowling greens, billiard rooms, assembly rooms with a roof promenade, a grotto and a lake. A cricket ground (the Royal New Ground) was also provided and was said to be "the best in the country" at the time. Despite the range of activities, and occasional high-profile stunts by associates of Ireland (such as a flying demonstration), the gardens never thrived, and soon fell into decline. Ireland sold them in 1826, and later owners presided over further decline until the facility was eventually closed in the 1840s. Only its south boundary wall and gate piers, decorated with copies of their original stone lions, survive.

Another development of the 1820s, on Thomas Read Kemp's landholding, was the Jewish cemetery and its chapel. Its location on Florence Place, off Ditchling Road just north of the railway line, places it marginally outside Brighton and Hove City Council's definition of the Round Hill area, but the site has always been associated with Round Hill. In 1826, Kemp, who at the time was a member of parliament, donated a parcel of land on the north slope of the hill to the congregation of Brighton's synagogue. The town had a large Jewish population—about 150 by 1840. An octagonal brick cemetery chapel (the Ohel), designed by the firm of Thomas Lainson and Son, was built in the burial ground in 1893. In accordance with Jewish custom, it had facilities for mourners to wash their hands upon leaving the "presence of death". Money to build the chapel and a fence round the cemetery was raised in the 1890s by charging members of the Middle Street Synagogue two shillings per week for a year; some prominent members of Brighton's Jewish community provided interest-free loans as well. Burials include Henry Solomon, Brighton Borough's chief constable (murdered in 1844); Hyam Lewis, a Brighton Town Commissioner and the first Jew in England to hold such a high-ranking municipal position; Levi Emanuel Cohen, a radical journalist who helped Brighton achieve borough status; and Sir John Howard, an engineer. The cemetery has been full for many years and is now closed except for family burials where a tomb already exists. It is locked and in poor condition; many graves are overgrown. The foundation stone commemorating Kemp's gift of the land survives, though. The cemetery chapel and its surrounding walls and gates are Grade II listed buildings.

In 1838, a windmill was built at the top of the hill, where the northern end of the present-day Belton Road stands. Although it was demolished in the early 20th century, it has been called "probably the most well-known feature of the Round Hill area". Its names included Rose Hill Mill, Round Hill Mill and Cutress's Mill, but its most common name—alluding to the type of windmill it was—was Tower Mill. Ownership changed regularly, and the mill was rarely profitable—even after Charles Cutress converted it to steam power in 1880. Storm damage soon afterwards caused further problems. The mill was demolished in 1913, and its bricks were recovered and used in the construction of some houses in Belton Road.

In 1854, the Diocese of Chichester selected an area of open land on the west side of Ditchling Road as the site of their Training College for Anglican Schoolmistresses, which had outgrown its premises in Black Lion Street in the old town. Viaduct Road was built in front of the Gothic Revival building's south façade around the same time and was built up with terraced houses by the early 1860s. In the early 20th century, the Diocese bought three of the four villas nearby and converted them into accommodation for trainee schoolteachers. Before that, the trainee teachers slept in large rooms in the Training College.

=== Residential development in the 19th century ===
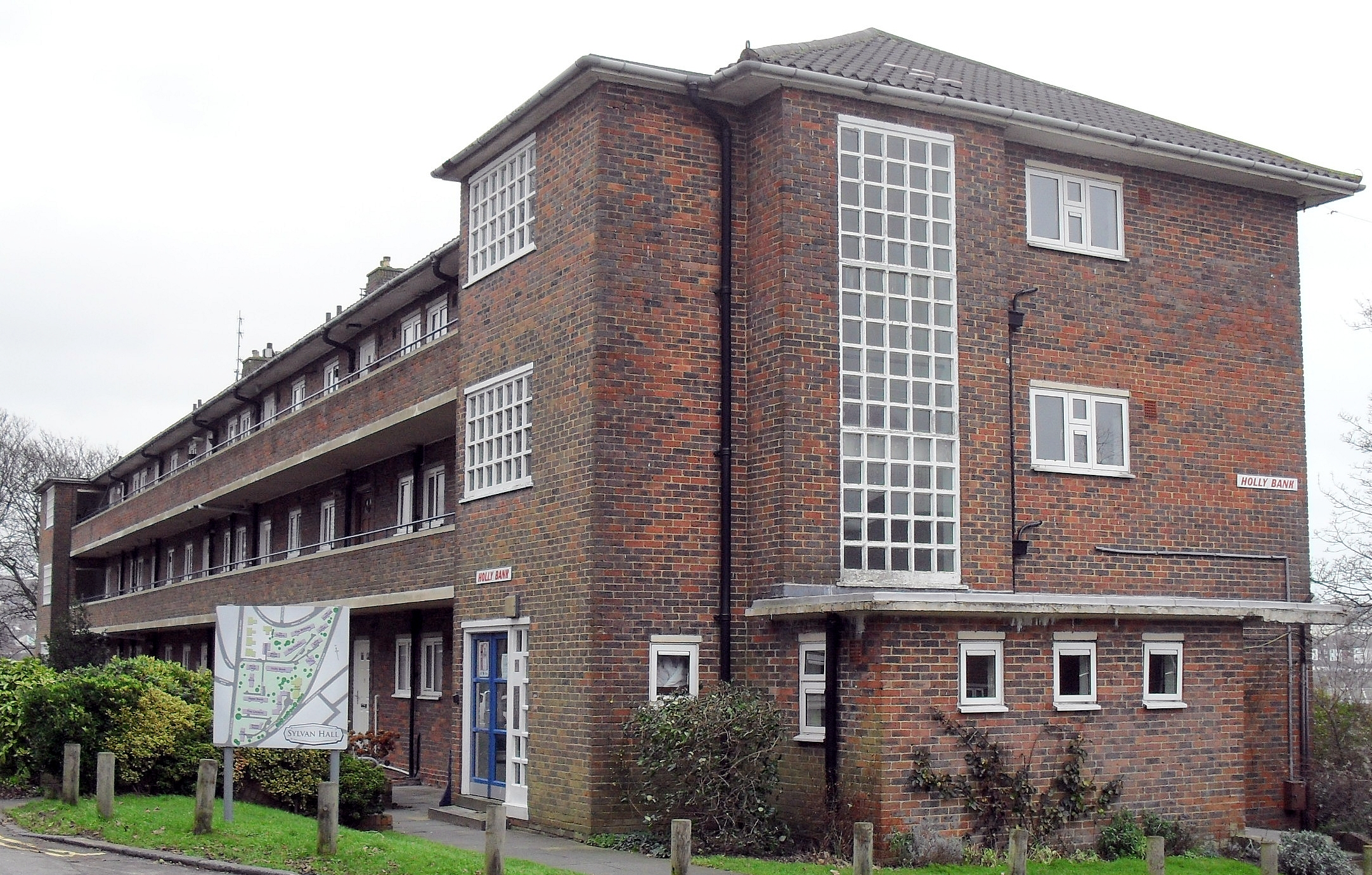
The Sylvan Hall Estate's flats, such as Holly Bank, were built in the 1950s on the site of four early 19th-century villas.

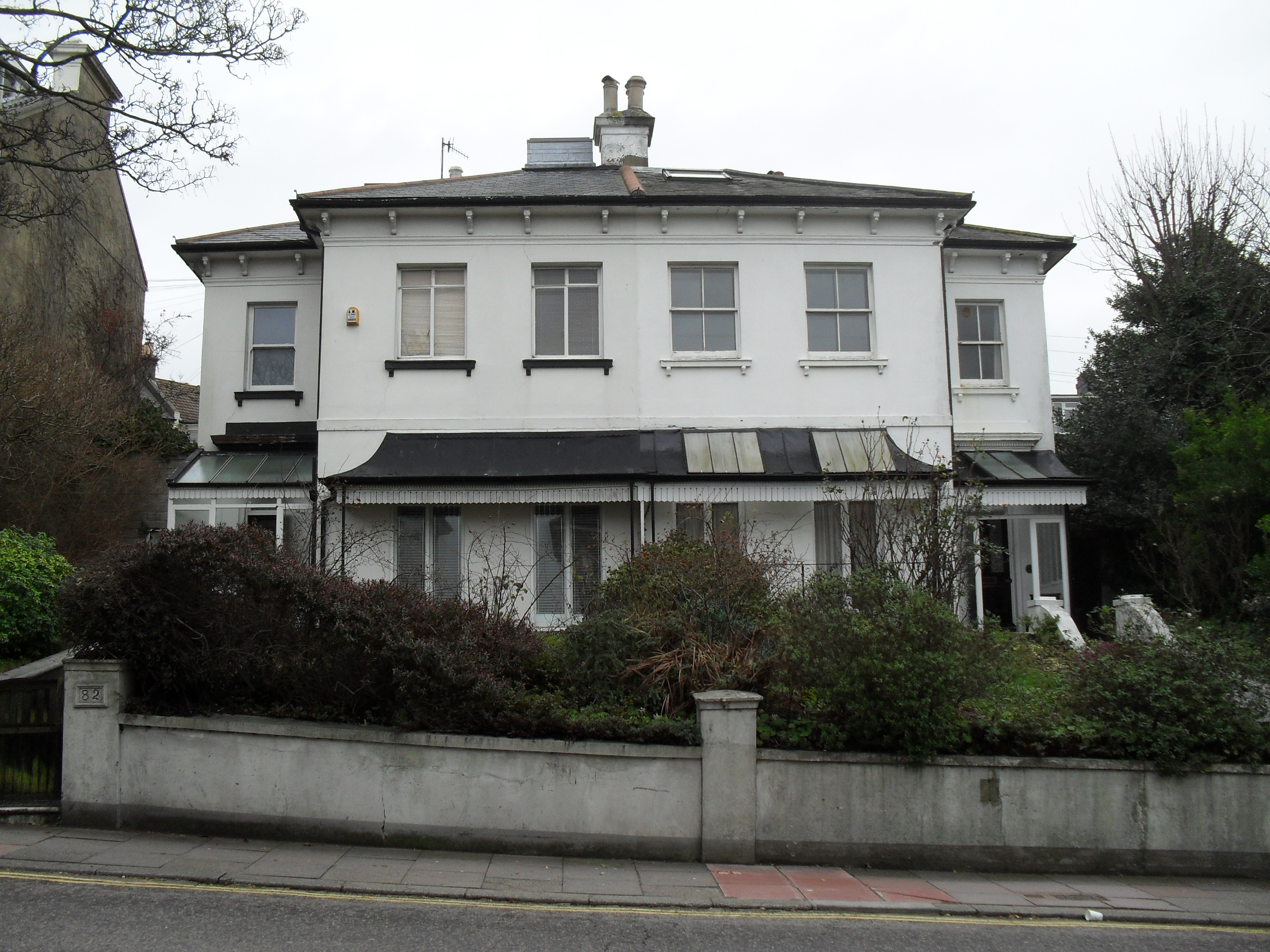
A group of semi-detached villas on Ditchling Road were among the earliest houses in the area.

Between 1838 and 1840, the local Colbatch family built four large detached villas in the former Rose Hill Park on a southwest-facing part of the hill. They were described as the "grandest and most ostentatious part of Round Hill", and the first (Rose Hill Villa, finished in 1838) was a "classic Victorian building". All four were large family homes in the Regency style popular in Brighton over the previous 30 years. Iron gates, protected by gatekeepers who lived in three cottages in the grounds, gave the villas privacy.

The site of the failed Pleasure Gardens then became one of Brighton's most exclusive residential developments in the 1850s, when prominent and influential local architect Amon Henry Wilds conceived and built the three-part Park Crescent development. The horseshoe-shaped terrace of 48 houses faced inwards towards a private garden formed from the old cricket ground. The "most ambitious scheme" of his long career was also one of his last: construction lasted from 1849 until 1854, and he died in 1857.

Contemporary housing developments included the southeast side of Upper Lewes Road, the west side of Lewes Road, and a series of impressive semi-detached villas on Ditchling Road, but Round Hill's most intensive period of growth began in the mid-1860s. "Fine curving terraces of Regency-style houses" appeared on the newly built Roundhill Crescent, which curved away from the northwest side of Upper Lewes Road, and semi-detached houses were laid out on Richmond Road behind and at a higher level. The first parts of Roundhill Crescent, still with a post-Regency character despite their late date, were built in 1865. Further development of the middle-class houses on these roads was patchy—many gaps still existed in 1875— but lower-class terraced housing spread rapidly elsewhere. Vicar of Brighton Rev. Arthur Wagner bought the northern part of the former Pleasure Gardens—still open land in 1860—and stipulated that houses costing no more than £120 should be built for Brighton's working-class population. He lent money to builders to increase the pace of development. The tightly packed terraced streets between Upper Lewes Road and Lewes Road were mostly complete by the 1870s, and St Martin's Church was built nearby to serve the area. Larger individual houses of the 1860s included Prince's Villa, in an isolated position next to Tower Mill, and Bryn—built in 1869 on Wakefield Road and used as an orphanage from 1875 until 1937.

Another period of rapid residential development occurred in the 1880s. The gaps in Roundhill Crescent were filled with houses in a more contemporary style than the old-fashioned Regency-style houses of the 1860s. Several streets around Prince's Road were built between 1880 and 1884. Also in the 1880s, The Salvation Army founded a place of worship in the area. The Citadel could hold 1,400 people, and was located on Park Crescent Terrace behind the west side of Park Crescent. Nearby, the Royal Hippodrome (unrelated to the Hippodrome in Brighton's old town) had opened on 31 October 1876. The 1,600-capacity building hosted a circus until 1889, then reopened under new ownership on 28 July 1890 as the Gaiety Theatre and cinema. Never a success, it closed permanently in 1900 and passed into commercial use until its demolition for flats in 1930.

=== Smallholdings and cat's-creeps ===
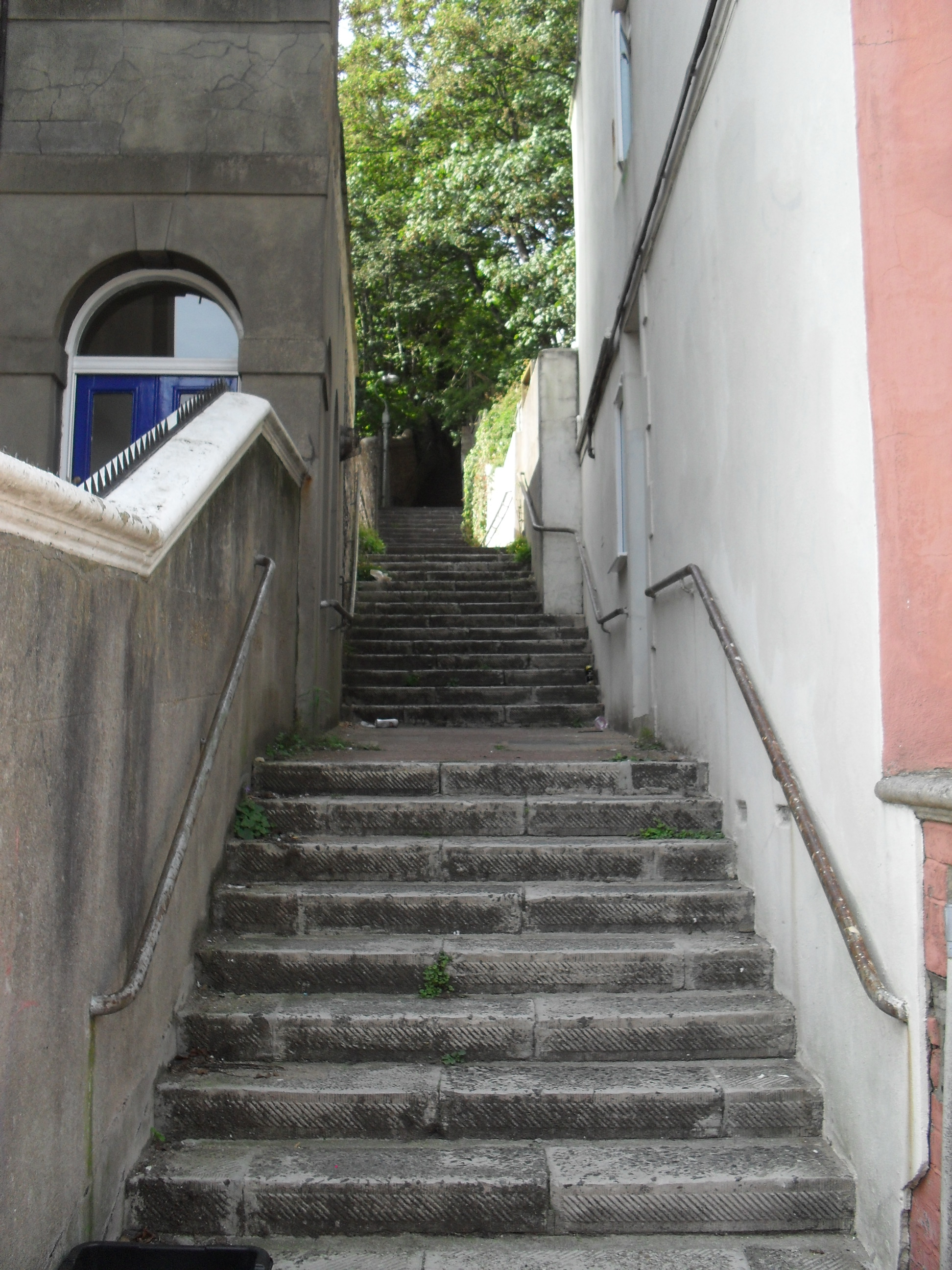
"Cat's-creep" staircases are found in hilly areas of Brighton.

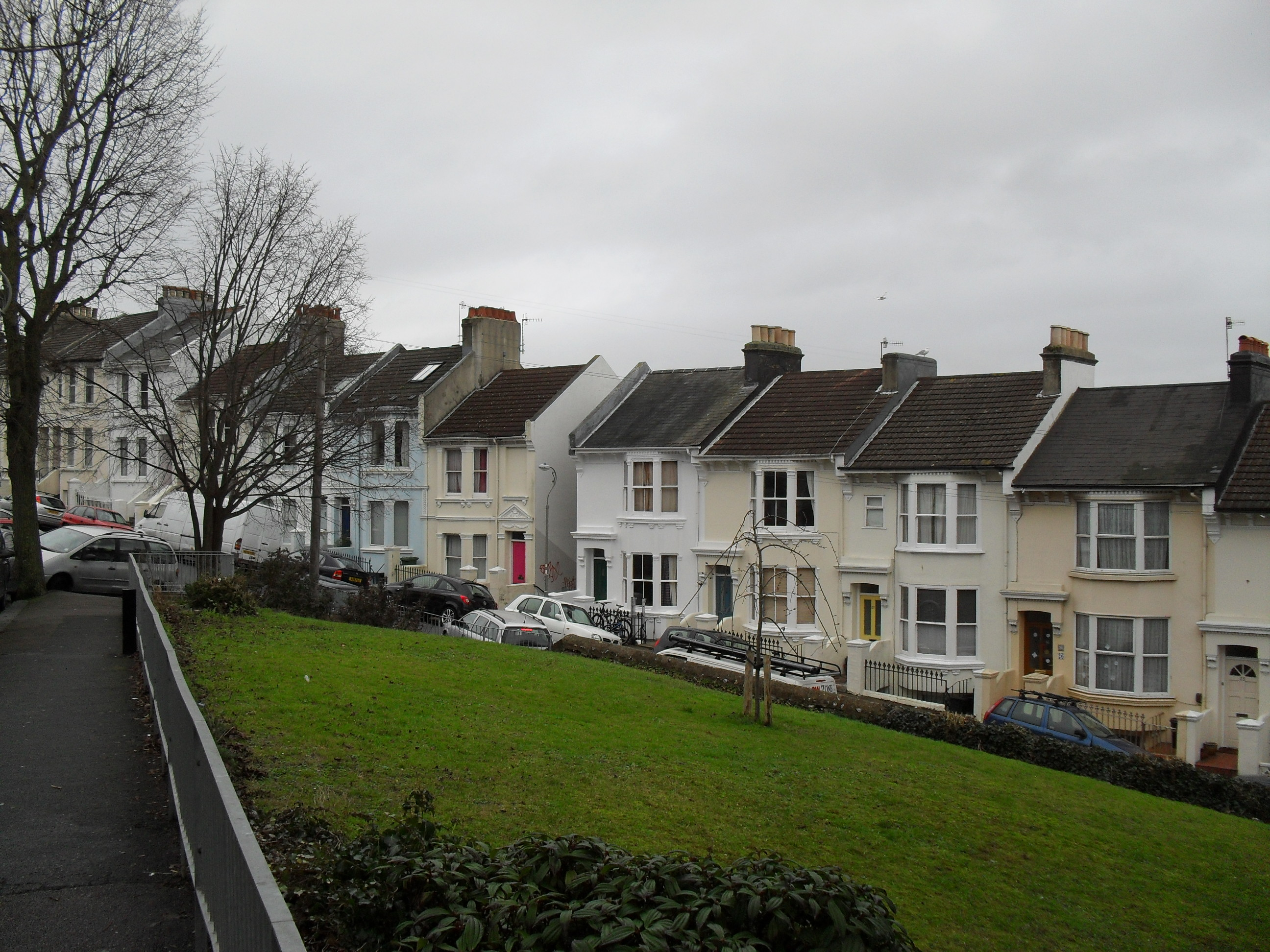
The cat's-creep leads up to Richmond Road, and emerges through a narrow gap between two terraced houses.

Despite this intensive building work, there were many gaps between houses and streets, and smallholdings and plant nurseries were common. Two existed in 1838, including one where grapes were cultivated, and more were planted in the 1850s. When the houses of Prince's Road were laid out, there were already two nurseries on it. A large nursery existed behind Park Crescent until 1883, when the Salvation Army Citadel was built on the site. Other areas of green space survive behind Richmond Road, between Wakefield Road and Roundhill Crescent, and along the railway embankment east of Ditchling Road tunnel. Clearly visible from afar, these green spaces give the area a strong visual character and are important wildlife habitats. Another characteristic topographical feature of Round Hill is the "cat's-creep", a type of steep, narrow staircase between buildings. Often found in Brighton's hilly suburbs such as Moulsecoomb and Hollingbury, the best example is found between Roundhill Crescent and Richmond Road. Named Lennox Place, it was planned at the same time as the nearby Mayo, D'Aubigny and Wakefield Roads, and was meant to be a proper street with houses. It was found to be too steep for horses and carts to negotiate, though, and it was laid out as a footpath with eight steep flights of 15 steps instead. It was a popular play area as well as a short-cut.

=== Employment and industry in the 19th and 20th centuries ===
With its sunny, breezy slopes, wide open spaces and distance from the polluted town centre, Round Hill was ideally placed for the development of 19th-century laundries. In many cases, these were small, home-based businesses, but some larger premises also existed. The Brighton and Sussex Laundry Works catered for large institutions such as hotels and schools as well as for small orders, employed many local women and had its own vans to transport washing around Brighton. Drying was carried out on a large area of open ground attached to the premises. Washing was also transported in and out by train via Lewes Road station, which was behind the building. This enabled work to be taken on from all parts of Sussex. Other long-established businesses included the Northern, Tivoli, Primrose and Mayo Laundries; and in the 1880s many houses in the newly built Prince's and Richmond Roads were set up as small-scale laundries, using their gardens for drying. For many years, the suburb was popularly known as "Laundry Hill", and laundries were the main source of local employment; but all trace of the industry disappeared by the 1980s.

Another important 20th-century industry was Cox's Pill Factory, which took over the Brighton and Sussex Laundry Works premises when that company moved to Hove in 1910. Founded by Arthur Cox in 1839 at Ship Street in the old town, the manufacturing division moved to premises at St Martin's Place in 1871. Cox's speciality was coating pills with a layer of sugar-based material to hide their taste, for which he received a patent in 1854. His sons bought the former laundry building on Lewes Road for £5,500 in 1910 and converted it into a factory, adding a landmark clock to the façade. The building was ready in 1912. Wartime government contracts augmented production for their regular customers, and the business thrived; it only moved away from the Lewes Road site in 1979 because expansion and modernisation were required. No suitable sites could be found locally, and the company relocated to Barnstaple in Devon. Another factory, which produced golf balls and (latterly) rubber products, occupied one of the semi-detached houses on Richmond Road from the 1920s until the 1980s.

=== Health ===
In 1905, Round Hill became a national leader in the field of mental healthcare when the first hospital for the treatment of mental illness was opened in the large house at 101 Roundhill Crescent. It evolved from a dispensary founded in 1899 by Dr Helen Boyle in the nearby suburb of Hanover. Dr Boyle rented the house at Roundhill Crescent, moved the dispensary there and added a 12-bed hospital for the treatment of what were then termed "nervous disorders". The Lewes Road Hospital for Women and Children was the first such facility in England: until then, people regarded as suffering from such disorders were sent to lunatic asylums. The hospital expanded in 1911 and moved to Ditchling Road, and later split into two parts housed in Brighton and the Brunswick Town area of Hove respectively. Inpatient facilities at the institutions ceased only in 1988.

Round Hill was at the centre of a health scare in 1950–51. A smallpox epidemic broke out in Brighton in late December 1950; the family of the first sufferer were regular users of the Tivoli Laundry on Crescent Road, and many employees were infected by the soiled linen. Two died, but rapid work by Brighton Corporation's health department prevented the outbreak spreading beyond Brighton.

=== Roundhill in the postwar era ===
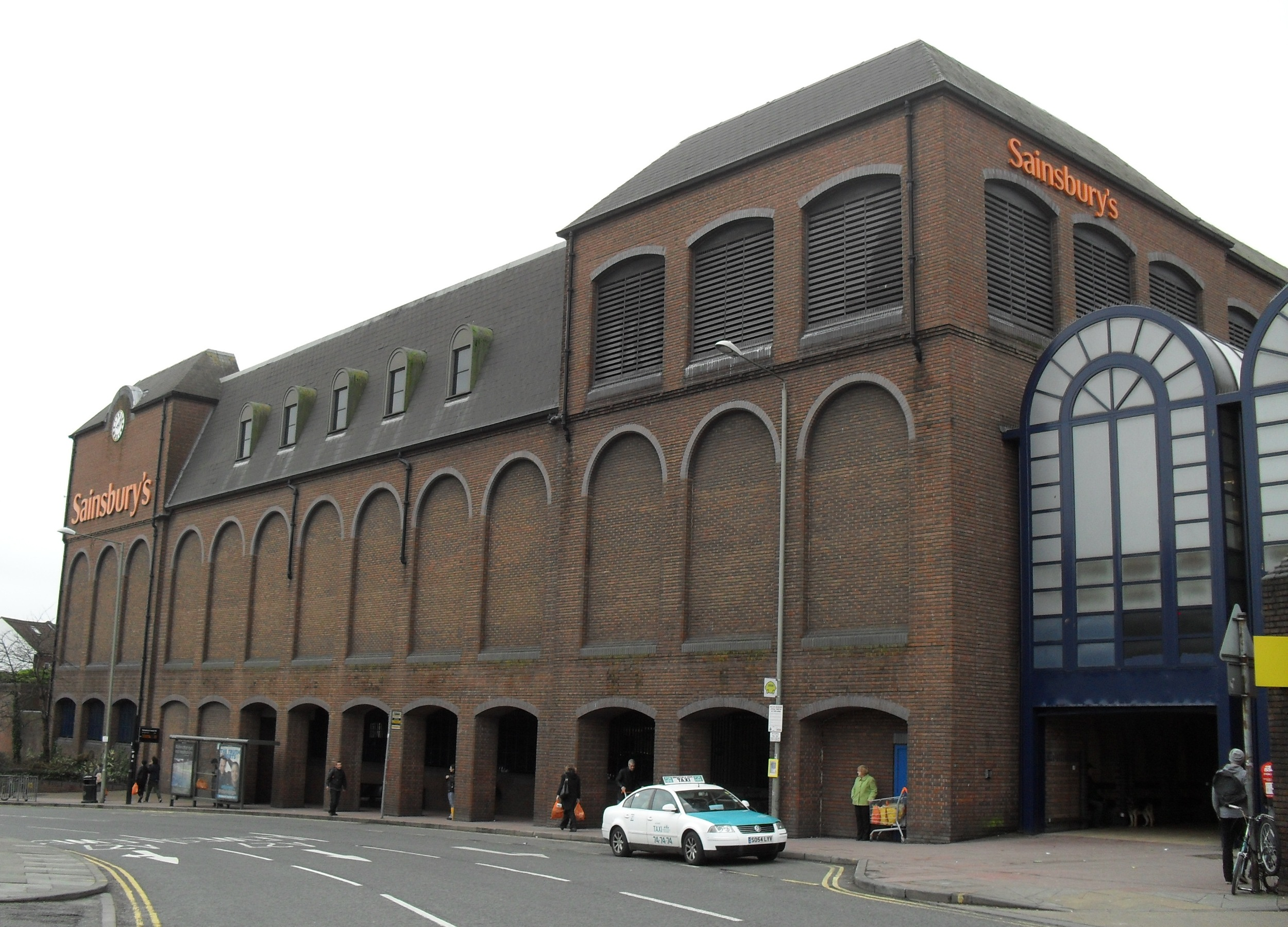
This Sainsbury's supermarket, built in 1985, stands on the site of the former Lewes Road viaduct.

The villas erected by the Colbatch family were demolished after the Second World War. The family, which still owned the buildings and the land, drew up plans to replace the four villas and the gatekeepers' cottages with flats. These were intended for private ownership, but council housing was so scarce in Brighton at the time (1945) that Brighton Borough Council bought the land using a compulsory purchase order and redeveloped it with council flats based on the family's designs. The new flats, built in the early 1950s, were large and well-built, and the old gardens were retained. At first, no young children were allowed to live there, and only higher earning council tenants could apply.

The closure of Cox's Pill Factory, the Kemp Town branch line and the nearby Vogue cinema in the 1970s and early 1980s prompted large-scale redevelopment. Between 1983 and 1985, a large area around the junction of Lewes and Upper Lewes Roads was cleared in favour of the Vogue Gyratory system and a Sainsbury's supermarket. The Vogue Gyratory, a major road junction connecting Upper Lewes Road, Lewes Road, Bear Road, and Hollingdean Road, opened in mid-1984. Sainsbury's was completed and opened on 23 April 1985; its design featured round-arched exterior arcades which recalled the recently demolished viaduct, and the clock was retrieved from the demolished pill factory and reset on the exterior of the new building. It won Brighton Council's design award in 1985.

On the Lewes Road station site at the junction of Richmond Road and D'Aubigny Road stands Pavilions, at Richmond House: which provides support for drug and alcohol-related issues.

== Buildings ==
Many buildings in the Round Hill area have been listed by English Heritage. A building or structure is defined as "listed" when it is placed on a statutory register of buildings of "special architectural or historic interest" by the Secretary of State for Culture, Media and Sport, a Government department. Grade I-listed buildings are defined as being of "exceptional interest" and greater than national importance; Grade II*, the next highest status, is used for "particularly important buildings of more than special interest"; and the lowest grade, Grade II, is used for "nationally important buildings of special interest".

=== Religious buildings ===
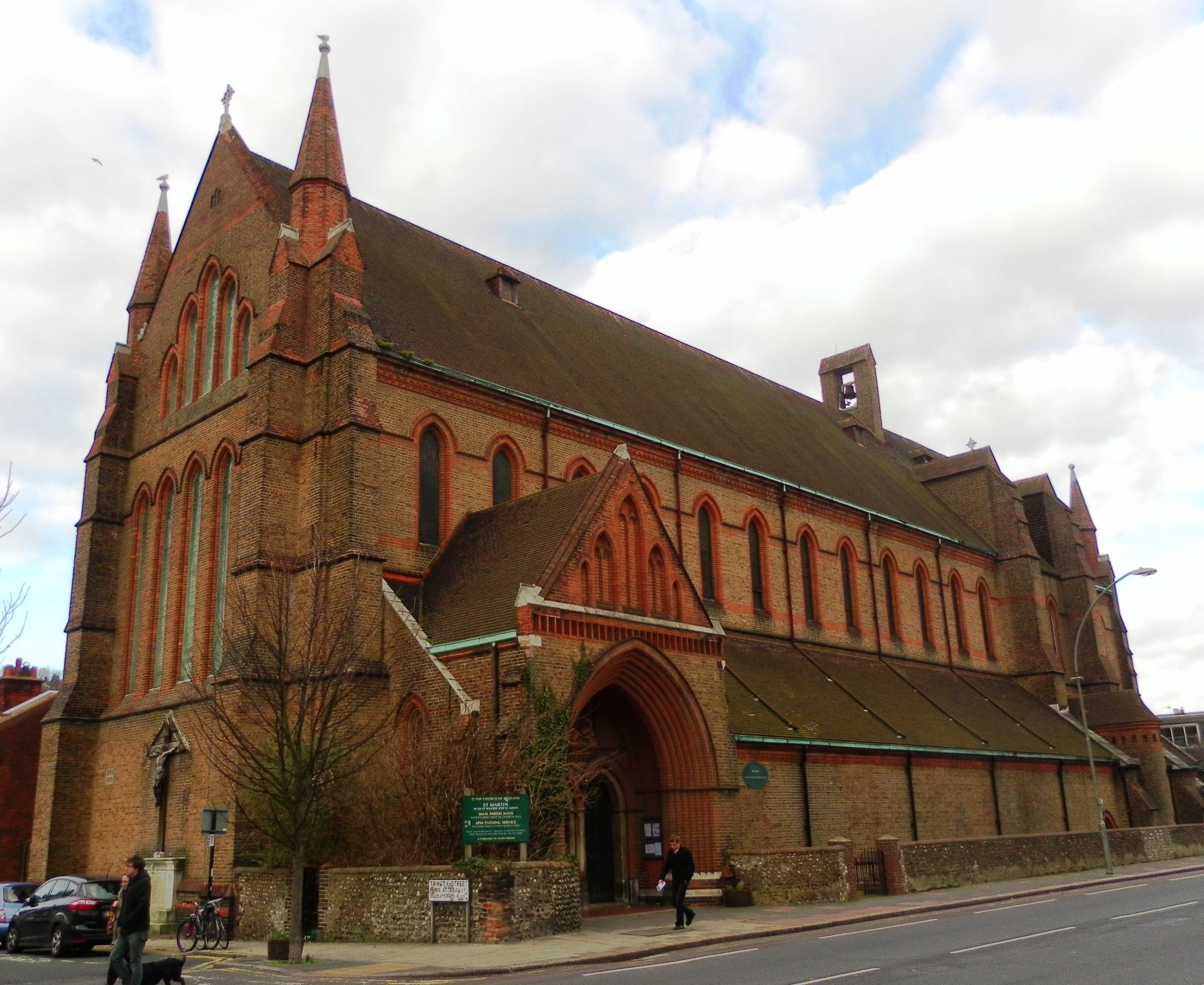
St Martin's Church is Brighton's largest.

Vicar of Brighton Rev. Arthur Wagner, who established a mission chapel in an old school building in 1867, planned to build a permanent church to serve the Round Hill area. St Martin's Church was built between 1872 and 1875 as a memorial to Wagner's father (and predecessor as Vicar of Brighton) Rev. Henry Michell Wagner, who died in 1870. The church was very large, reflecting the density of housing in Round Hill and its proximity to Preston Barracks, where many soldiers were based. This also influenced its dedication—to Martin of Tours, the patron saint of soldiers. Up to 1,500 worshippers could be accommodated in the vast, cathedral-like interior. George Somers Leigh Clarke's plain, "almost ruthless" exterior, of red and yellow brick in the Early English Gothic Revival style, contrasts with the "breathtaking magnificence" of the interior, whose fixtures and decoration were planned by Clarke and designed to his specifications. It is one of 69 Grade II* listed buildings in Brighton and Hove.

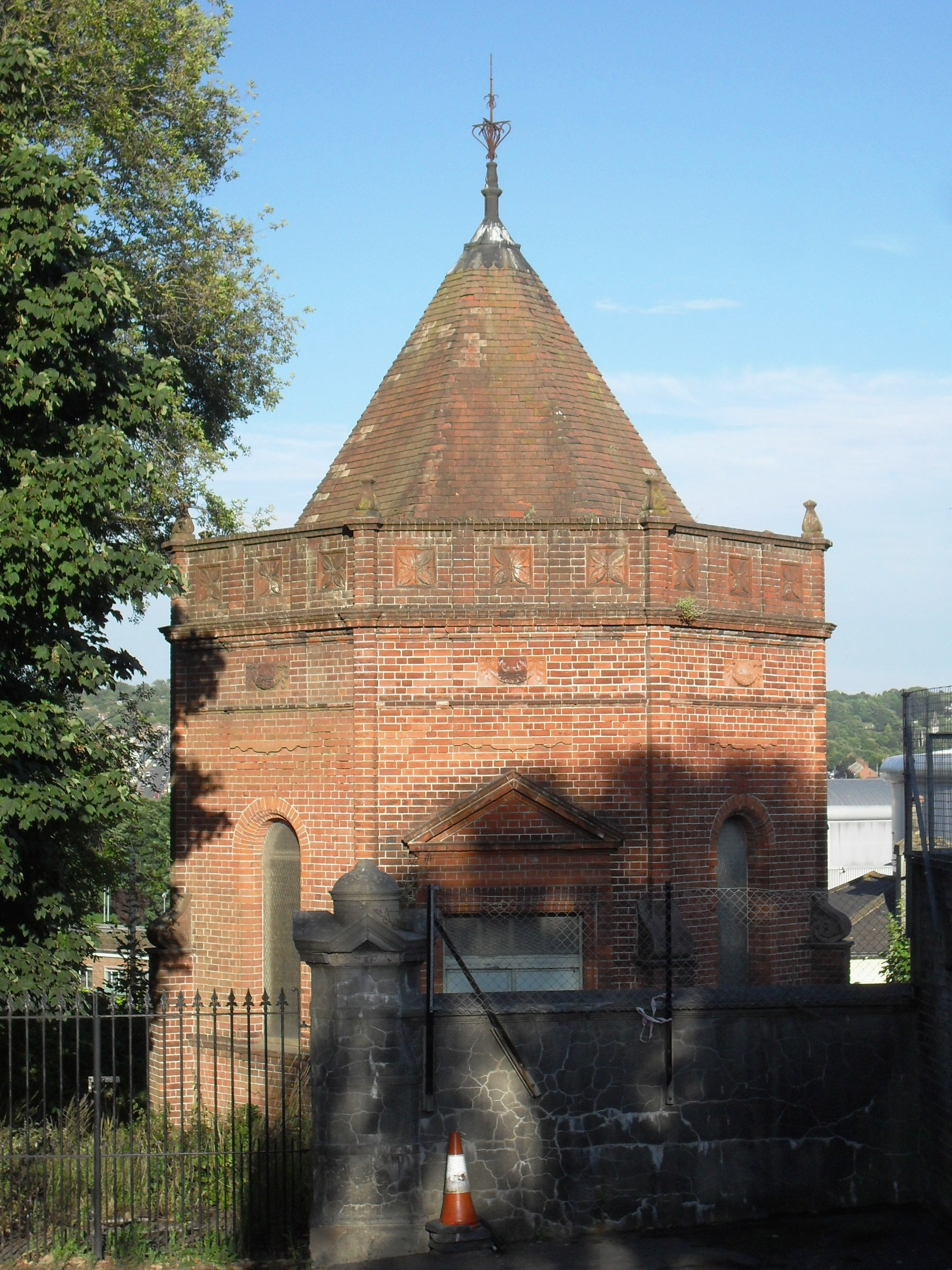
The chapel at the Jewish Cemetery off Ditchling Road was built in 1893.

A small chapel, opened by the Railway Mission in 1876 but now with an Evangelical congregation, is adjacent to the fire station on Viaduct Road. James Barnes's Gothic Revival building has three lancet windows on the façade and projecting entrances which resemble porches. There is decorative machicolation on the parapet.

Catherine Booth, wife of the founder of The Salvation Army William Booth, opened a large Salvation Army citadel behind Park Crescent in March 1884. Designed and built of red brick and terracotta in 1883 by E.J. Hamilton, it could hold 1,400 people and had castellated towers at the corners. It was extended in 1925, but in 2000 it was demolished and replaced with a smaller octagonal Congress Hall designed by David Greenwood. Its design recalls some of the features of the Park Crescent houses opposite.

St Saviour's Church served the southwestern part of Round Hill until 1981. The flint and brick building, set below the level of Ditchling Road and on its west side, was in the Early English Gothic Revival style and was meant to have a tower; only a stub was ever built. The architects were Edmund Scott and F.T. Cawthorn. An extension was built in 1889, and in 1904 a large reredos designed by Richard Herbert Carpenter and W. Slater was moved to the church from Chichester Cathedral. Congregations declined, and the church was demolished in 1983; flats called St Saviour's Court and a rear archway in Vere Road recall its existence.

At the north end of the suburb, the Lewes Road Congregational Church was built in 1872. A. Harford's design has been described as Italianate Gothic. The congregation joined the United Reformed Church, but the church closed in 1993 and the building was sold for redevelopment. The congregation moved to a new building, and the flats of Stanley Court were built behind the old façade.

The cemetery chapel (Ohel) at the Jewish burial ground is Grade II-listed. Designed in 1893 by Lainson and Son and built by the Garrett building firm, it is a red-brick octagonal structure in the Queen Anne style, with a tiled turreted roof and corbel-topped piers at each corner, a pedimented entrance and arched windows set below recessed panels. The burial ground is surrounded by walls, stucco-faced gate piers and wrought iron fences which are listed separately at Grade II.

=== Other buildings ===
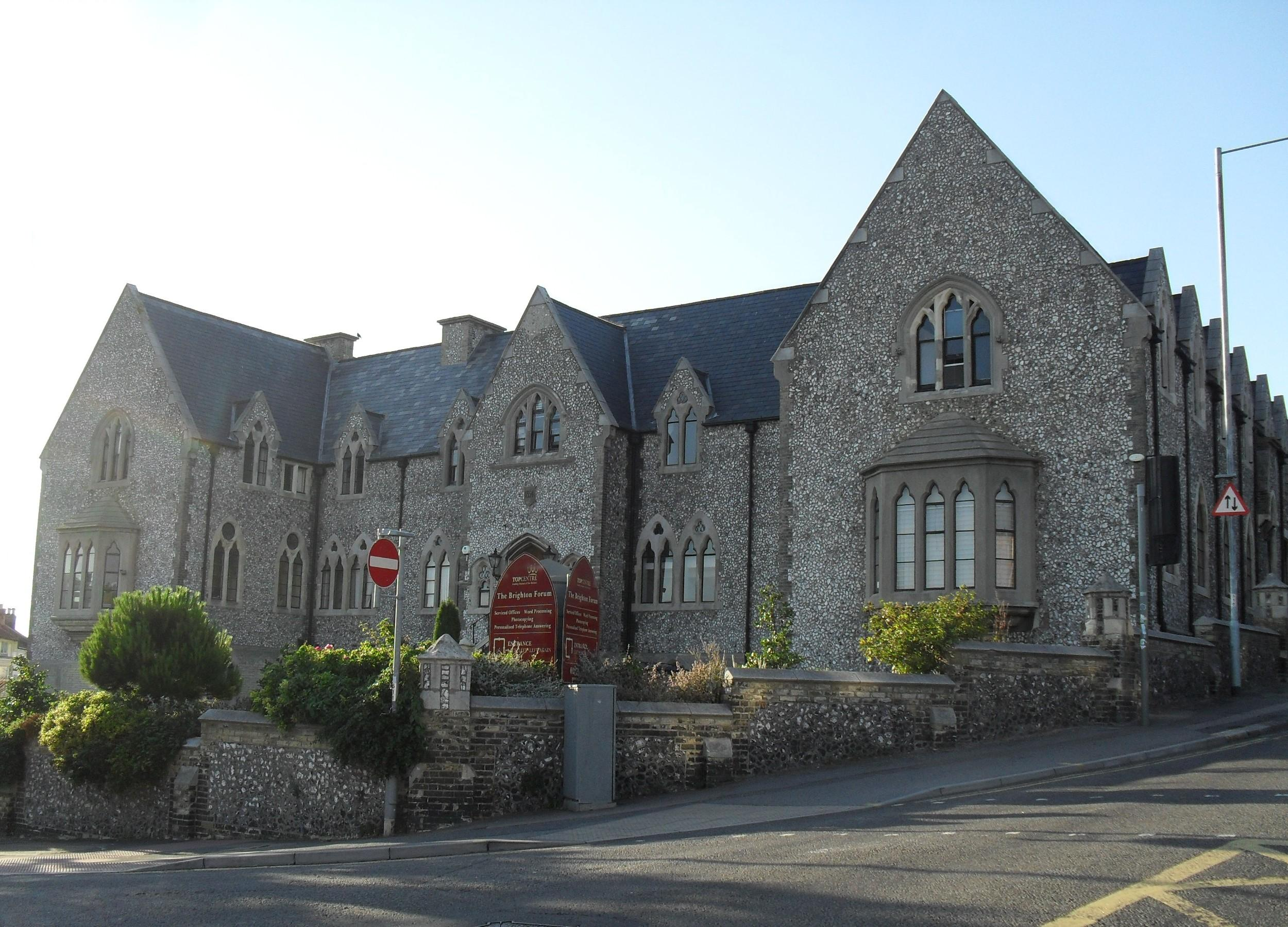
The Brighton Forum is a landmark on Ditchling Road.

The building now called Brighton Forum, at the junction of Ditchling and Viaduct Roads, forms a local landmark. The Grade II-listed knapped flint Gothic Revival structure, designed by William and Edward Habershon, was built in 1854 on open land at the northern boundary of Brighton Borough as the Diocese of Chichester's training college for Anglican schoolmistresses. It was extended to the north in 1886, and was used as a training college until the Second World War, when the Royal Engineers requisitioned it and used it to store their records and archives. After its closure in 1987, it was briefly threatened with demolition, but in 1988 it was converted into serviced offices under the name Brighton Business Centre (later Brighton Forum).

Standing next to each other at Preston Circus, at the northwest edge of the suburb, are the Duke of York's Picture House and Brighton's main fire station. The cinema opened on 22 September 1910, making it one of the first in the world, and it is still operational as England's oldest working cinema. The Clayton & Black firm's ornate Baroque-style building, with a three-bay façade defined by paired pilasters with rustication, cost £3,000. The fire station, designed in a "restrained Modernist" style by Graeme Highet in 1938, curves round the road and features carved motifs by Joseph Cribb. Its materials are brown brick and Portland stone.

The former Tower Mill stood at the top of Round Hill between 1838 and 1913. Built of about 50,000 bricks, and with walls with a maximum thickness of 2 feet (0.61 m), it rose to 60 feet (18 m) and was topped with a copper dome. The four sails were about 32 feet (9.8 m) long and were attached to a walnut wood rotating roof.

== Transport ==
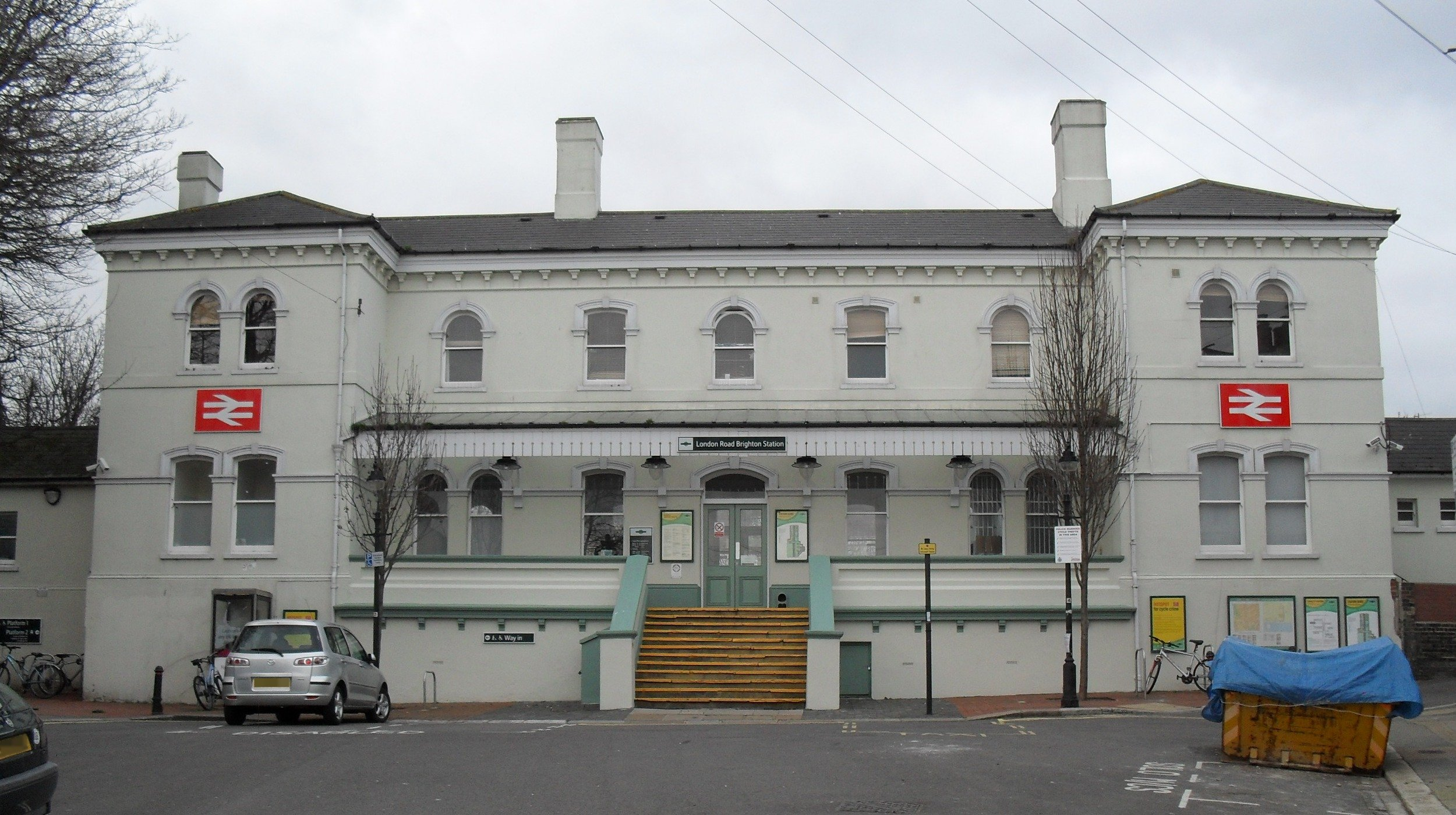
London Road railway station was opened on the northern edge of the Round Hill area in 1877.

The East Coastway Line, a railway line currently operated by Southern, forms Round Hill's northern boundary. London Road station, situated in a cutting between London Road and Ditchling Road, serves the area. Situated 3/4 mile (1.2 km) from Brighton station, it opened on 1 October 1877 and retains its substantial ticket office building. The 400-yard (370 m), 27-arch London Road viaduct (built in 1846) rises to 67 feet (20 m) above the London Road valley immediately west of the station, separating the Round Hill suburb from neighbouring Preston. A 63-yard (58 m) tunnel then takes the line under Ditchling Road.

Immediately beyond the tunnel was Kemp Town Junction, where the Kemp Town branch line diverged. The first station to serve Round Hill was on this route, which "cut through the area and created a new artery" upon its opening on 2 August 1869. A three-platform station called Lewes Road opened on 1 September 1873 at the north end of D'Aubigny Road. The line was expensive to build and maintain: it crossed Lewes Road on a 52-foot (16 m)-high, 180-yard (160 m)-long viaduct, and beyond Round Hill there was another short viaduct and a long tunnel. Passenger services at Lewes Road station ceased on 31 December 1932, but coal trains continued to use its six-siding goods yard. The line closed completely on 14 June 1971, and the Lewes Road viaduct was demolished in part in 1976 and completely in 1983.

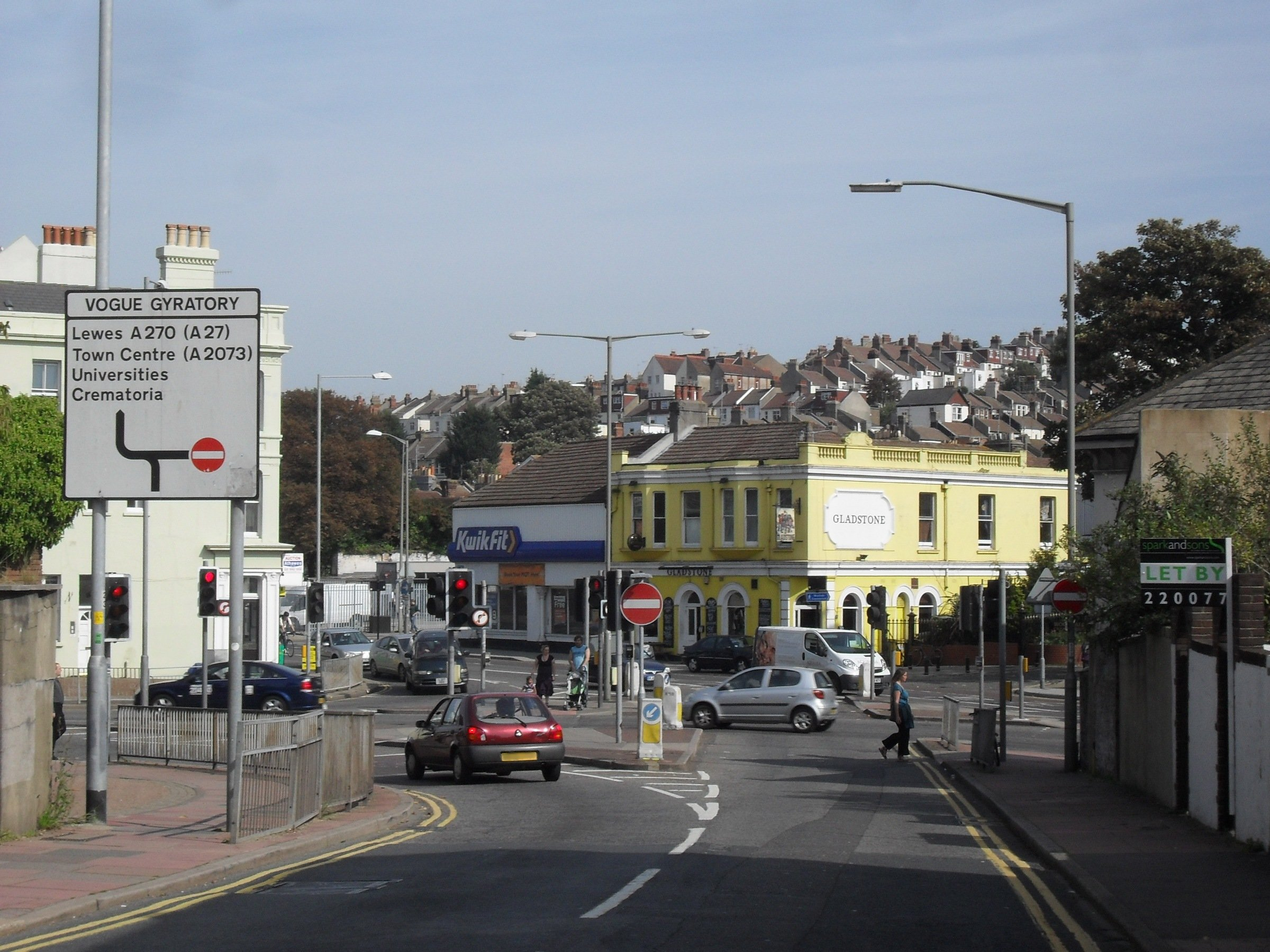
The Vogue Gyratory, built in the mid-1980s, occupies the site of the former Lewes Road viaduct.

The main reason for the Kemp Town branch line's decline was the increasing popularity of buses. The three main roads running through Round Hill—London Road, Ditchling Road and Lewes Road—are used by many regular routes, mainly operated by the Brighton & Hove Bus and Coach Company. Routes 26, 46 and 50, which serve Hollingbury and Hollingdean northbound and Brighton city centre, Hove and Southwick southbound, run via Ditchling Road. Routes along London Road include the 5 (Patcham to Hangleton) and 56 (Patcham to the Knoll Estate in Hove). Along Lewes Road, regular routes include 21, 23, 24, 25, 28, 29, 38 and 49, serving places such as Sussex and Brighton Universities, Hove, Lewes, Uckfield, Tunbridge Wells, Moulsecoomb, Bevendean and Queen's Park. Several other routes use Union Road, the southern boundary of the Round Hill area.

Some bus services are based on old tram routes operated by Brighton Corporation Tramways between 1901 and 1939, and their trolleybus successors. The Corporation ran eight tram routes, mostly from Brighton Aquarium, to various parts of Brighton. Routes B and D (a pair of circular services between the Aquarium and Beaconsfield Villas/Ditchling Road) used Ditchling and London Roads, and route L (Aquarium to Moulsecoomb) travelled along Lewes Road. Some routes also used tracks on Viaduct Road. The system's only fatal accident occurred in 1935 in Round Hill when a tram skidded outside the Diocesan Training College and hit a cyclist.

The three main roads—and Upper Lewes Road, which runs between the Ditchling and Lewes Roads—experience heavy traffic, but little through traffic uses the smaller residential streets such as Roundhill Crescent. Traffic calming measures installed in 2003 have acted as a deterrent. There are high levels of on-street car parking, though. Union Road and the Vogue Gyratory are also high-traffic routes. The Gyratory, "a fiendish maze of one-way systems, roundabouts and crossings", is the point at which Upper Lewes Road and Lewes Road meet two other routes. Named after the Vogue—latterly a pornographic cinema—it was built in 1983–84 on the site of the former Lewes Road viaduct, Cox's Pill Factory and surrounding buildings in connection with a Sainsbury's supermarket development. Demolition of the entire complex of roads was already being advocated in 2007.

== Conservation area ==
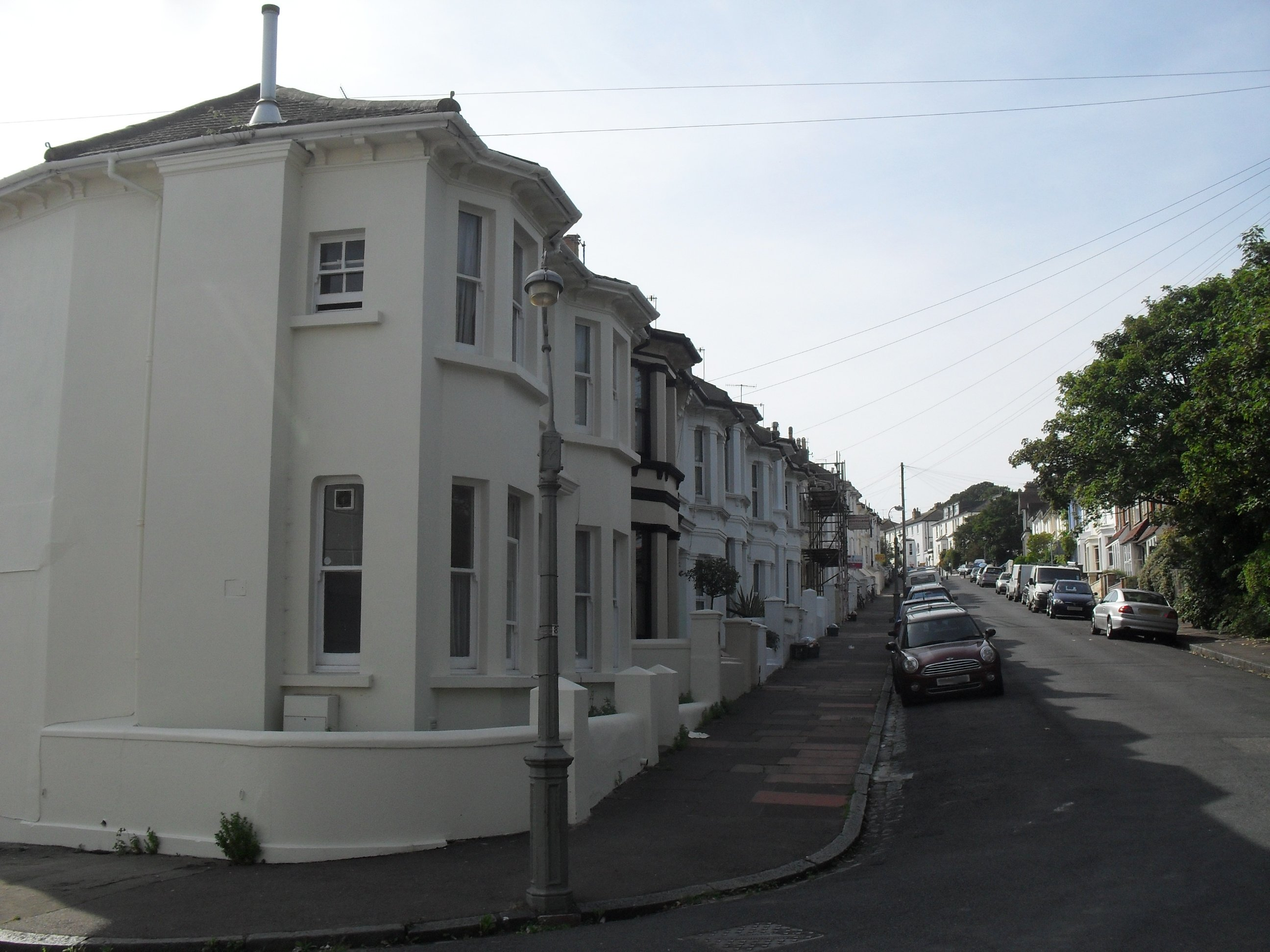
Richmond Road has two-storey terraced houses and larger semi-detached villas.

On 6 January 1977, 29.78 acres (12.05 ha) at the heart of Round Hill was designated as a conservation area; as of 2025 it is one of 34 such areas in the city of Brighton and Hove. Its boundaries are (clockwise from north) Prince's Road, Mayo Road, D'Aubigny Road, Roundhill Crescent, Upper Lewes Road, Wakefield Road, Prince's Crescent and Ditchling Road. This area includes all the Grade II-listed houses of Roundhill Crescent (described by Brighton and Hove City Council as "the most important architecturally"), two pubs (including the Tudor Revival-style New Vic, built in the 1920s and representing a late addition to the mostly late 19th-century streetscape), and four paired semi-detached villas on Ditchling Road which were some of the earliest houses in the area—they date from about 1850.

The area's character derives from its "tight urban form" and lack of 20th-century redevelopment, resulting in a homogeneous streetscape of mostly residential buildings in long terraces; its steeply sloping land; and the swathes of trees and gardens which can be seen in long views into the area, which help to "define the unaltered Victorian streetplan" when seen from a distance. Roundhill Crescent "both curves and changes height dramatically along its length". The houses, which on the northwest side of the road are not a continuous terrace and which date from the 1860s to the 1880s, vary in height and the extent of their architectural detailing; canted bay windows and original cast-iron balconies feature prominently. Some pairs of semi-detached villas of the 1860s survive on Richmond Road. Prince's Road, where the 223-foot (68 m) summit of Round Hill is located, has a long, well-defined frontage of rendered terraced houses dating from the 1880s, with an older flint and brick house with decorative bargeboards and gables breaking up the composition.

Building materials vary greatly. Brick was rarely used at the time Round Hill was developing (although a few houses in Belton Road were built of it); bungaroosh was often used for walls instead. Characteristic of Brighton but almost unknown elsewhere, this consisted of random assortments of materials such as low-quality brick, cobbles, flints, pebbles, rubble, wood and sand, set in hydraulic lime and shuttered. Bungaroosh was often faced with render or stucco to make it weatherproof. Some flint buildings survive on Prince's Crescent. When built, most windows in the conservation area's houses were sashes, and roofs were of Welsh slate.

The area retains many original boundary walls, often in brick and flint or cast iron. Some pavements were laid with blue-brick paving slabs, and a few survive. Elsewhere, granite kerbstones, stone-dressed gutters and road crossing points laid with limestone and brick remain from the 19th-century development of the area, and some cast-iron lamp-posts have survived.

== Gallery ==
Views of Round Hill
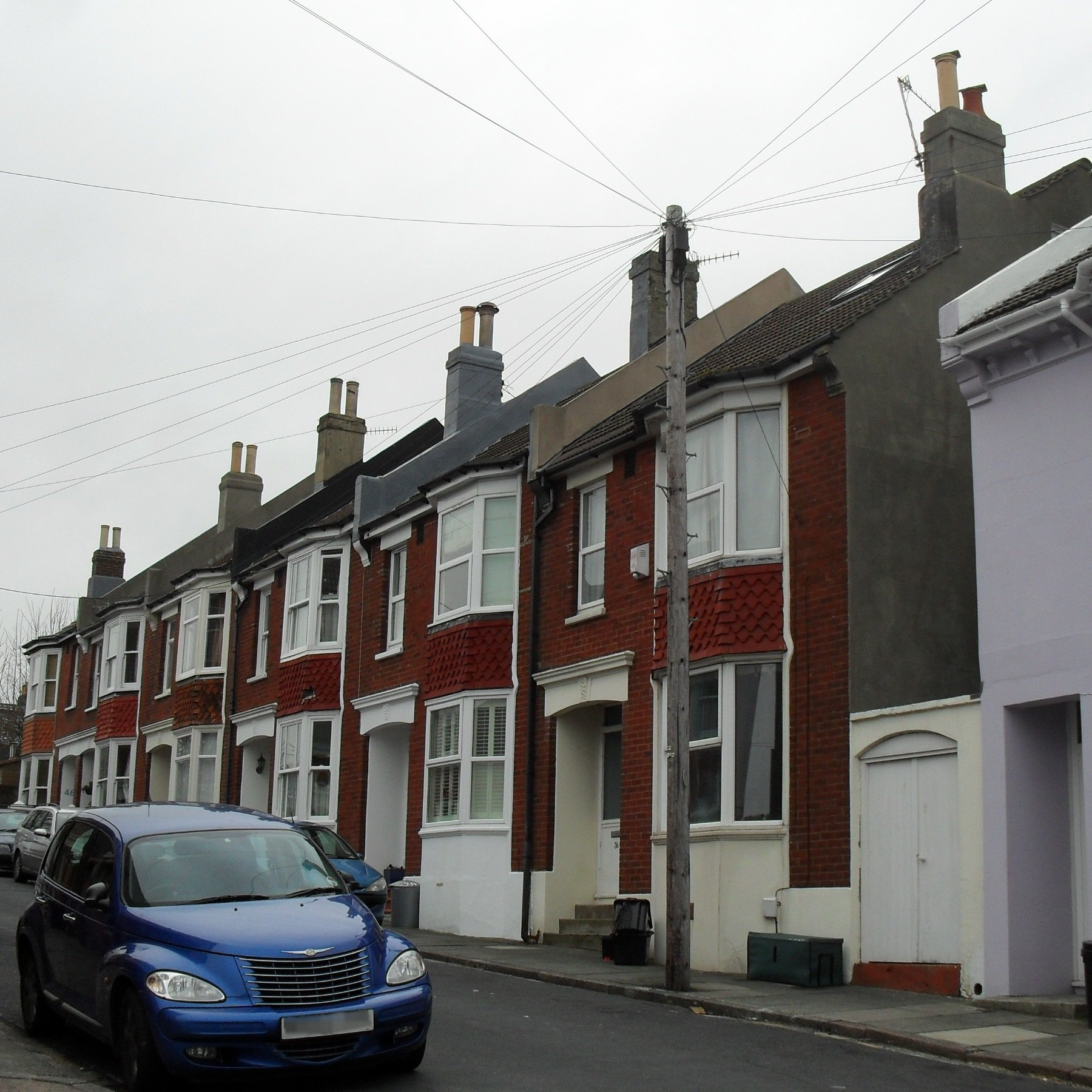
These brick houses on Belton Road occupy the site of a former windmill, whose bricks were reclaimed and used for the houses.

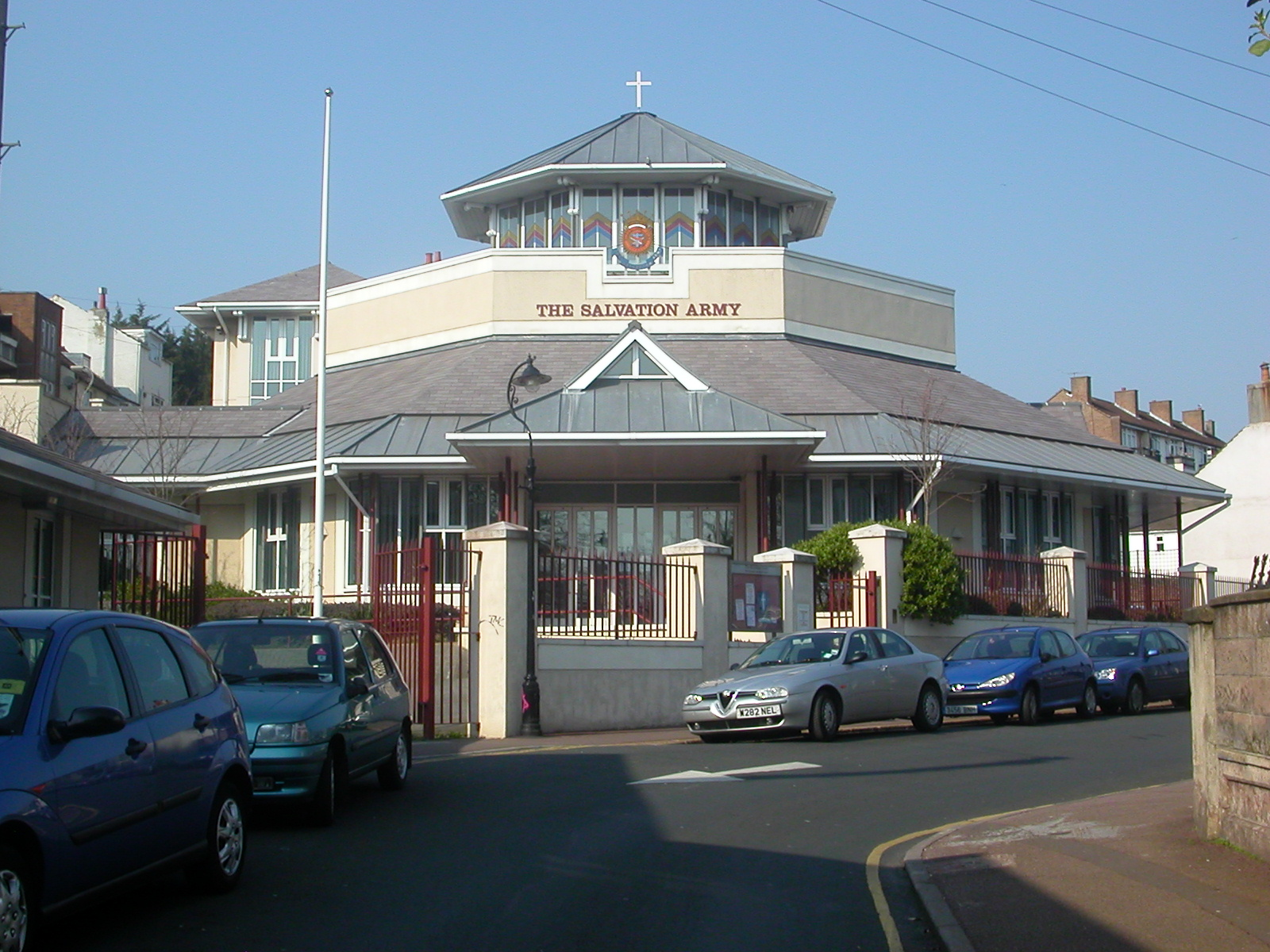
The Salvation Army Congress Hall behind Park Crescent stands on the site of its 1883 predecessor.

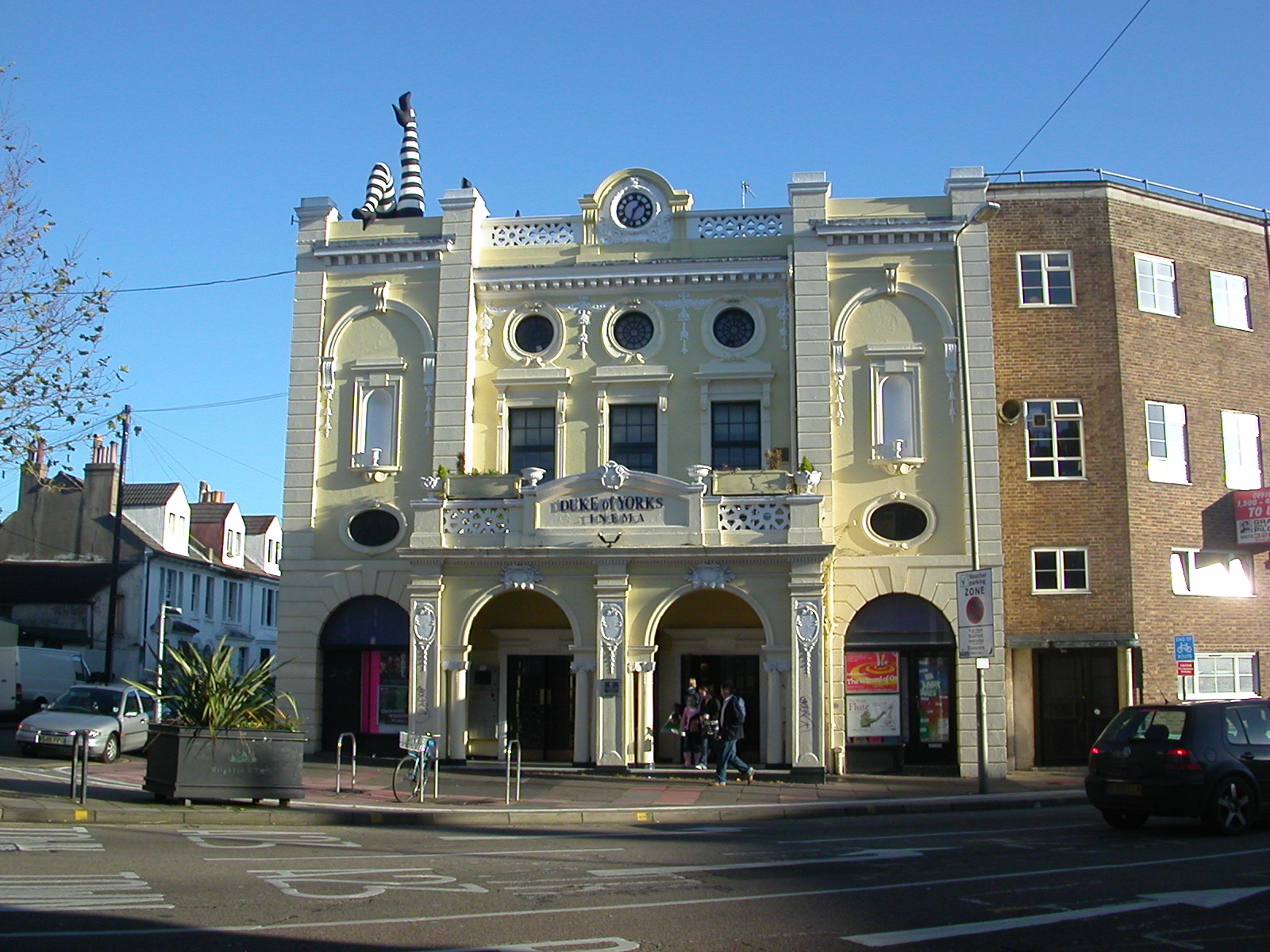
The Duke of York's Picture House has a Baroque façade.

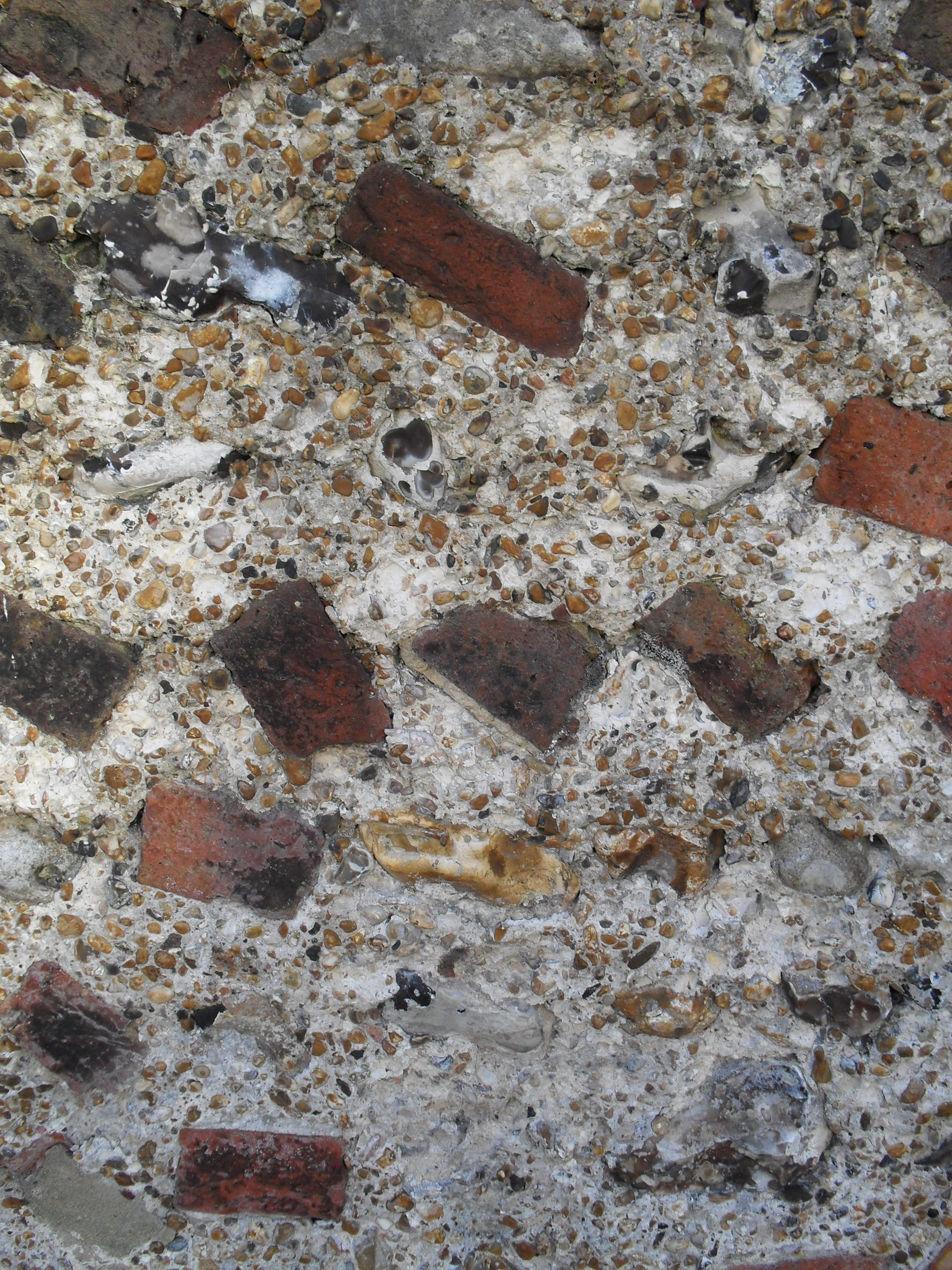
Plain bungaroosh walls can be seen in parts of the conservation area, such as here at Prince's Crescent.

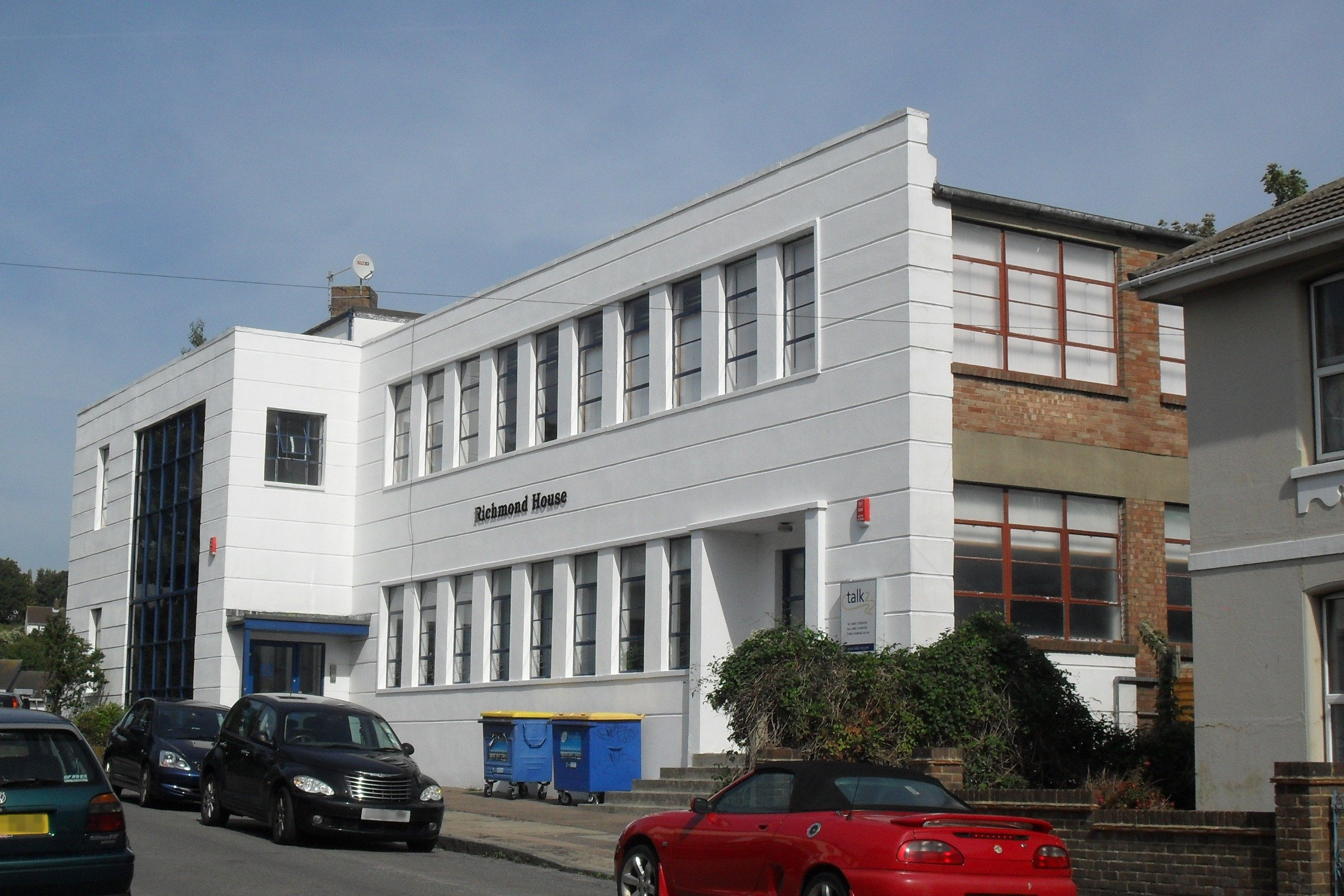
Planning permission was sought in 2013 to demolish Richmond House on D'Aubigny Road and replace it with student flats.

== See also ==
- Cemeteries and crematoria in Brighton and Hove
- List of conservation areas in Brighton and Hove
- List of demolished places of worship in Brighton and Hove
- List of places of worship in Brighton and Hove
