= List of former board schools in Brighton and Hove =

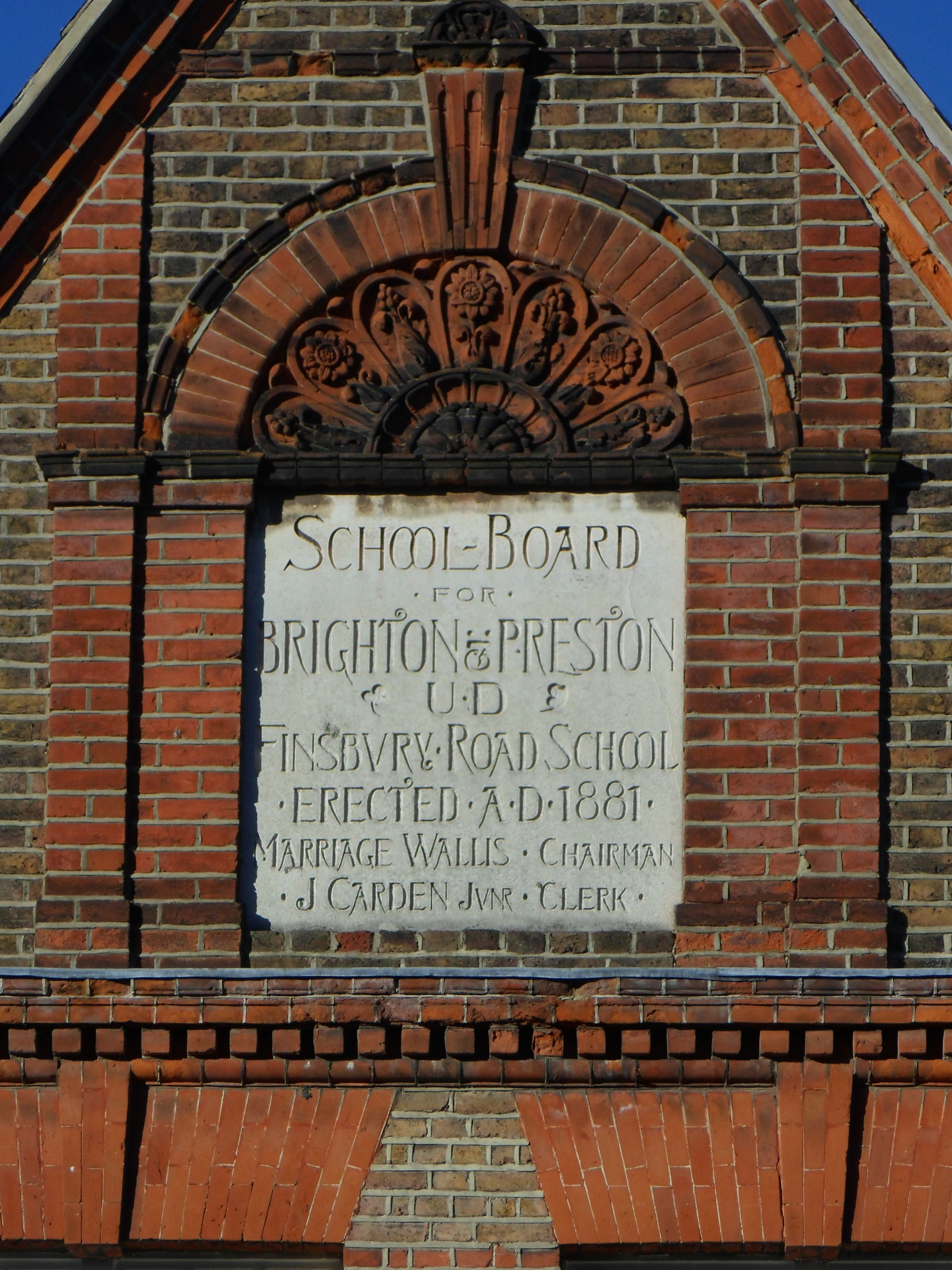
This plaque on the former Finsbury Road Board School records the date of its opening, 1881, and the name of the Brighton and Preston School Board.

Between 1870 and the early 20th century, "a distinguished group of board schools" were built in the area covered by the present city of Brighton and Hove on the south coast of England. All were designed and built by the local firm of Thomas Simpson & Son, whose members were Scottish architect Thomas Simpson (1825–1908) and his Brighton-born younger son Gilbert Murray Simpson friba (1869–1954). John William Simpson, the older of Thomas's two sons, may also have been involved with some of the work.

There was no nationally coordinated scheme of primary-level education until the Elementary Education Act 1870 (33 & 34 Vict. c. 75) was passed; this empowered local councils to form school boards with elected members and funded by rates. Brighton's population was growing rapidly at the time, and many new schools were needed. Thomas Simpson was appointed architect and surveyor to the Brighton School Board in 1871 and held the same positions with the Hove School Board from 1876. In 1878, Brighton School Board merged with that of the neighbouring parish of Preston to form the Brighton and Preston School Board, and Simpson became the architect and surveyor of this new entity.

Many of the schools were large buildings of "excellent" architectural quality, situated in rapidly expanding suburban areas such as Round Hill, Queen's Park and Prestonville. Thomas Simpson and his son, who became a partner in the firm in 1890, used a range of materials—characteristically red brick, terracotta and pebbledashing—and their preferred style evolved from Queen Anne Revival on the early schools towards a more elaborate "Edwardian Free style". The final school, St Luke's (1903), has been described as "the culmination of [Thomas Simpson's] career". The building holds Grade II listed status. Some of the schools have been demolished, while others have closed and are now in residential use or are owned by other educational institutions (some were acquired by Brighton Polytechnic and Brighton College of Technology during the 20th century); but several remain in use as primary schools. Finsbury Road School was threatened with demolition in 1999 but was granted listed status and thereby saved; and the York Place Elementary Schools were nearly destroyed by bombing in 1940 during the Brighton Blitz.

After its formation, the Brighton School Board also took over a small number of existing schools and schoolrooms based in chapels. Also within the Board's remit were industrial schools for persistent truants. The first, established in a former workhouse in the village of Chailey in 1875, moved seven years later to a house in Patcham. The second, in Mile Oak near Portslade, was built in conjunction with the London School Board.

== Board schools ==
- The "Date" column gives the date of completion of the building.
- The "Grade" column gives the listed building status if applicable.
- All schools were built by Thomas Simpson or (from 1890) Thomas Simpson & Son except those marked (†), which were built prior to the Elementary Education Act 1870 and were taken over by the school board as a result of the act.

Name	Image	Location	Date	Grade	Notes	Refs
Middle Street School (†)	—	The Lanes; 50.8226°N 0.1428°W	1809	—	The Union Charity School was founded by Edward Goff in 1807. It was for boys only, but a girls' school was added in 1809. They later took the names Royal Union School and Middle Street School. Goff gave £400 and £200 respectively for the two schools, but other financial support came from the public. Although the schools were non-denominational, Sunday attendance at a Congregational chapel was required. The school board took over the running of the schools in 1874, and the buildings survived for just under a century from that time: the present Middle Street Primary School replaced the old school in February 1973 on a slightly different site.	
Puget's Schools (†)	—	The Lanes; 50.8222°N 0.1400°W	1861	—	These schools were in Clarence Yard behind North Street. They were taken over by the school board in 1870. No trace remains of the buildings or the street on which they stood.	
Fairlight Place Board School		Elm Grove; 50.8349°N 0.1252°W	1870	—	Fairlight Place itself was built up at the same time as the school. Thomas Simpson's building was remodelled in 1931 and is still in use with the name Fairlight Primary and Nursery School.	
York Place Elementary Schools		North Laine; 50.8286°N 0.1361°W	1870	—	Simpson's buildings were extended in 1884 when girls' and boys' secondary school buildings were added. These were named York Place Secondary School from 1898 and moved out in 1926 and 1931 respectively to the new Varndean School campus (built by Gilbert Murray Simpson). The 1870 buildings then took the names Fawcett School for Boys and Margaret Hardy School for Girls, and when these transferred to new premises in Patcham in the 1960s Brighton Technical College (now City College Brighton & Hove) acquired them. The stone-banded red brickwork is in Simpson & Sons' "typical Brighton Board School manner".	
Hanover Terrace Board School	—	Hanover; 50.8308°N 0.1285°W	1873	—	Thomas Simpson built this school on a narrow site between Hanover Terrace, which had been developed in the early 1830s, and Coleman Street. It became a boys-only school in 1928, and the infants department shut four years later. After World War II it became Brighton Secondary Technical School. By 1990 it was an annexe of the Brighton College of Technology, but in 1999 planning permission was granted for its demolition and replacement with houses.	
Richmond Street Board School	—	Carlton Hill; 50.8264°N 0.1327°W	1873	—	This was the first Brighton school to offer meals to pupils. It was one part of the Richmond Street/Sussex Street schools complex which ran along Claremont Row between the two streets. The buildings were compulsorily purchased in 1959 and demolished as part of the Carlton Hill redevelopment scheme.	
Sussex Street Board School	—	Carlton Hill; 50.8257°N 0.1330°W	1874	—	Built to Thomas Simpson's design a year after the neighbouring Richmond Street school, it was treated as part of the same complex: the two parts were for girls and boys respectively, and playgrounds separated them. A nursery school was added, but the site of the school has disappeared under postwar housing development.	
Freshfield Place Board School		Queen's Park; 50.8228°N 0.1263°W	1880	—	The school continues in use as Queen's Park Primary School and has about 400 pupils between the ages of 3 and 11.	
Preston Road Board School		Preston Park; 50.8355°N 0.1423°W	1880	—	Simpson built this "excellent" school on a site between the London Road viaduct and the bottom of Preston Park. It continued in use as a junior school until 1937; it later served secondary-age pupils as the Preston Technical Institute and subsequently became the Preston Road Campus of City College Brighton & Hove, specialising in the teaching of plumbing. In October 2016 it was sold for residential conversion. The building's "flamboyant" architectural features include gables with pediments, steep roofs and prominent chimney-stacks.	
Finsbury Road Board School		Hanover; 50.8281°N 0.1269°W	1881	II	The school was bought by Brighton Polytechnic in 1956. Listed in 1999 in response to threatened demolition, it was converted in 2003 to flats called Hanover Lofts. The former junior school section rises to two storeys and is flanked by higher projecting cross-wings. The infants section has one cross-wing and is lower but wider, with an 11-window range. The Arts and Crafts-style building is of brown brick with red-brick and concrete dressings, a slate roof (topped with a cupola) and terracotta decoration.	
Circus Street School (demolished)		Carlton Hill; 50.8247°N 0.1348°W	1883	—	The Board took over an existing school on this street in 1870, but Thomas Simpson's yellow-brick building replaced it in 1883. It closed in 1926: the pupils transferred to Richmond Street and Sussex Street, and the building was sold to Brighton Polytechnic. The Circus Street Annexe, as it was later known, was refurbished in 2010. In the early 21st century major redevelopment was proposed for the Circus Street area; in 2005 the council stated that "the Annexe has some architectural and historic merit but its retention will not be a requirement of any redevelopment scheme", and a plan which involved demolition was unveiled in 2012. The building was demolished in summer 2017.	
Connaught Road School		Hove; 50.8295°N 0.1769°W	1884	II	Simpson's plans for this school were dated July 1882, but John T. Chappell built it in 1884. It was used as a primary school for exactly a century, after which it became an adult education centre. Representing an "elegant", "distinctive" and early use of the Queen Anne style, it is a yellow- and red-brick building with curved gables and terracotta-coloured render. Extensions were added in 1893 and 1903—designed by Simpson—and in 1900, to the design of Clayton & Black.	
Ditchling Road Board School		Round Hill; 50.8392°N 0.1343°W	1890	II	Like the Finsbury Road school, this brown-brick building has separate wings for infants and juniors, of one and two storeys respectively. Four prominent gable ends face Rugby Road, each with pediments and brick louvres. There is rich terracotta and brick decoration. The school is still in use as the Downs Junior School.	
Elm Grove School		Elm Grove; 50.8318°N 0.1232°W	1893	—	The road dates from 1852, and the densely populated residential area to which it gave its name developed between 1860 and 1880. Children transferred to the new school from an older school on Bentham Road. Now known as Elm Grove Primary School, it caters for more than 400 pupils between 4 and 11. It is in the "typical earlier Board School style" of Thomas Simpson.	
Stanford Road Board School		Prestonville; 50.8358°N 0.1475°W	1893	II	Now a primary school serving the Prestonville suburb, the complex four-part building "retains its original plan and detailed features" inside and has many distinctive features on the exterior: a three-storey clock tower, decorative mouldings and pediments, a gabled timber belfry, gables in various shapes, pilasters and balustrades. Brown and red brick, stone, tile and render are the main materials.	
St Luke's Board School		Queen's Park; 50.8271°N 0.1214°W	1903	II	"The most prominent building" in the Queen's Park area is the final school the Simpsons designed together. The "variety of materials and ornamental devices" in the Arts and Crafts-style composition include red and brown brickwork, terracotta, stone dressings, tiles, wood and lead; and aediculae, stair turrets, arched windows with moulded swags in their spandrels, large and small gables, bell-cots and the Brighton Borough coat of arms. The school remains in use.	

== Schoolrooms and Industrial schools ==
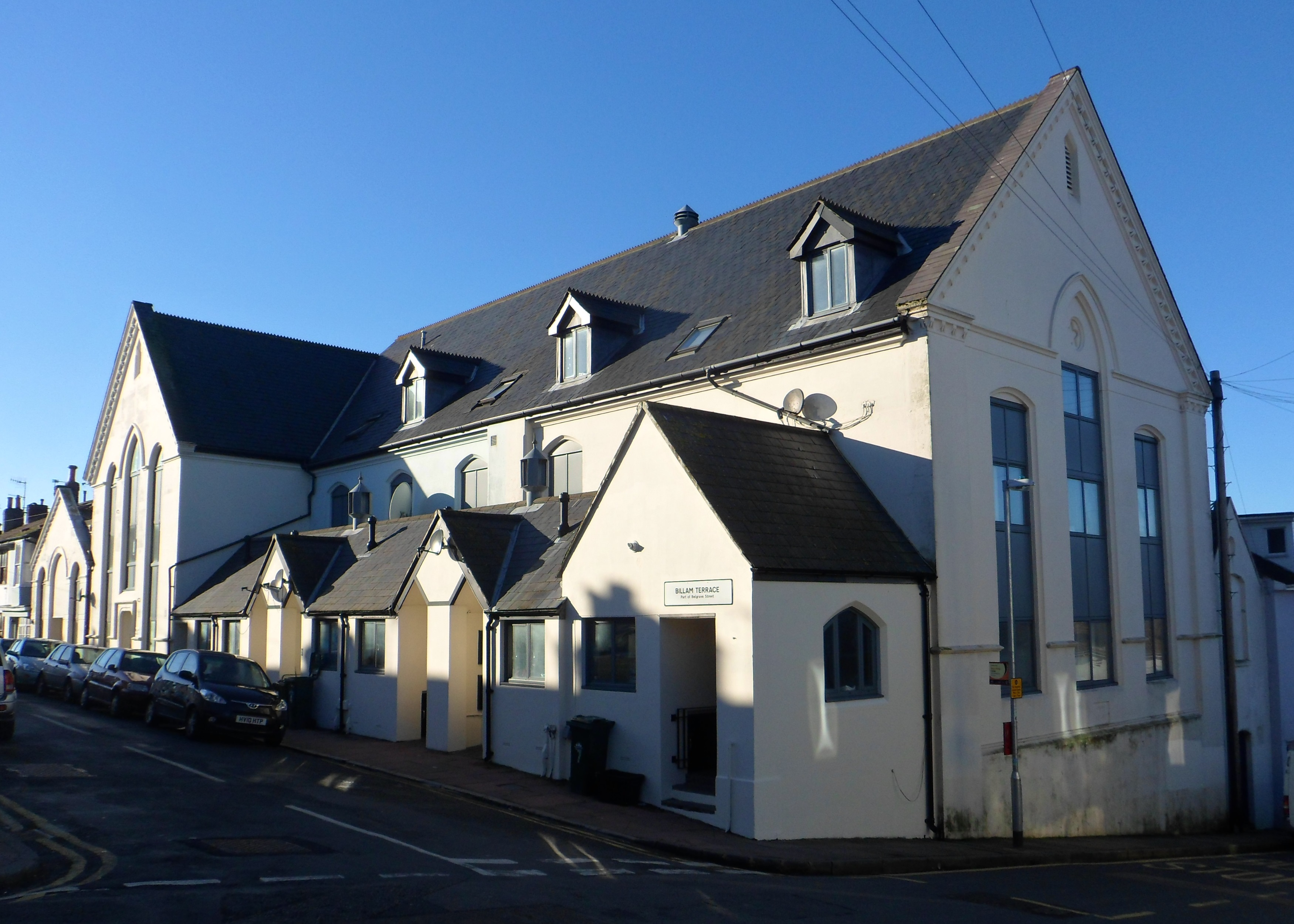
Belgrave Street Congregational Chapel's schoolroom was taken over by the Board in 1870.

When the Brighton School Board was founded in 1870, it took over two schoolrooms based in Nonconformist chapels in inner suburban areas. One was at the London Road Chapel (50.8303°N 0.1371°W) on Belmont Street, which dated from 1830 and which was used by the Countess of Huntingdon's Connexion until 1881, after which it adopted a Congregational character. Thomas Simpson had extended the building early in his career, in 1856–57. The chapel was demolished in 1976, 18 years after its closure. The other was at Belgrave Street Congregational Chapel (50.8289°N 0.1304°W) in Hanover—a building which still stands, albeit not in religious use. This was another of Thomas Simpson's buildings: he designed it in either 1859 or 1865 in a stuccoed Early English Gothic Revival style. It included a schoolroom from the beginning, and this was in continuous use until 1942—thereby outlasting the school board. The building became an annexe of Brighton Polytechnic, then was turned into flats in the late 1990s.

The Brighton and Preston School Board acquired a former workhouse in Chailey, East Sussex in 1875 and converted it into the Brighton and Preston Board Industrial School for Boys. It was registered on 9 June 1875. The 18th-century building is Grade II-listed and is now part of Chailey Heritage School. The new Brighton and Preston School Board Industrial School, at Purley Lodge in Patcham (50.8631°N 0.1511°W), received its industrial school certification on 12 October 1882 but closed in 1905.

At Mile Oak Road between Portslade and Mile Oak (50.8463°N 0.2281°W) was the Brighton Town and London County Council Industrial School for Boys, later known as Portslade Industrial School and then Mile Oak Junior Approved School for Boys. This was built and funded jointly by Brighton and Preston School Board and the London School Board. It received its industrial school certification on 3 May 1902 and was built at a cost of £30,000. The annual running costs, reported as £3,342 in 1904, were split equally between the two councils. The "handsome structure of red brick" had above its entrance a distinctive sculpture of a boy with an open book on his knees. Following a final name change to the Mile Oak Community Home in 1971, the institution closed on 31 August 1977 and the site was cleared for housing. Only the entrance lodges remain.

== See also ==
- Media related to Former board schools in Brighton and Hove at Wikimedia Commons
- List of Birmingham board schools
- List of schools in Brighton and Hove
