= Prestonville, Brighton =

Suburb of Brighton, East Sussex, England

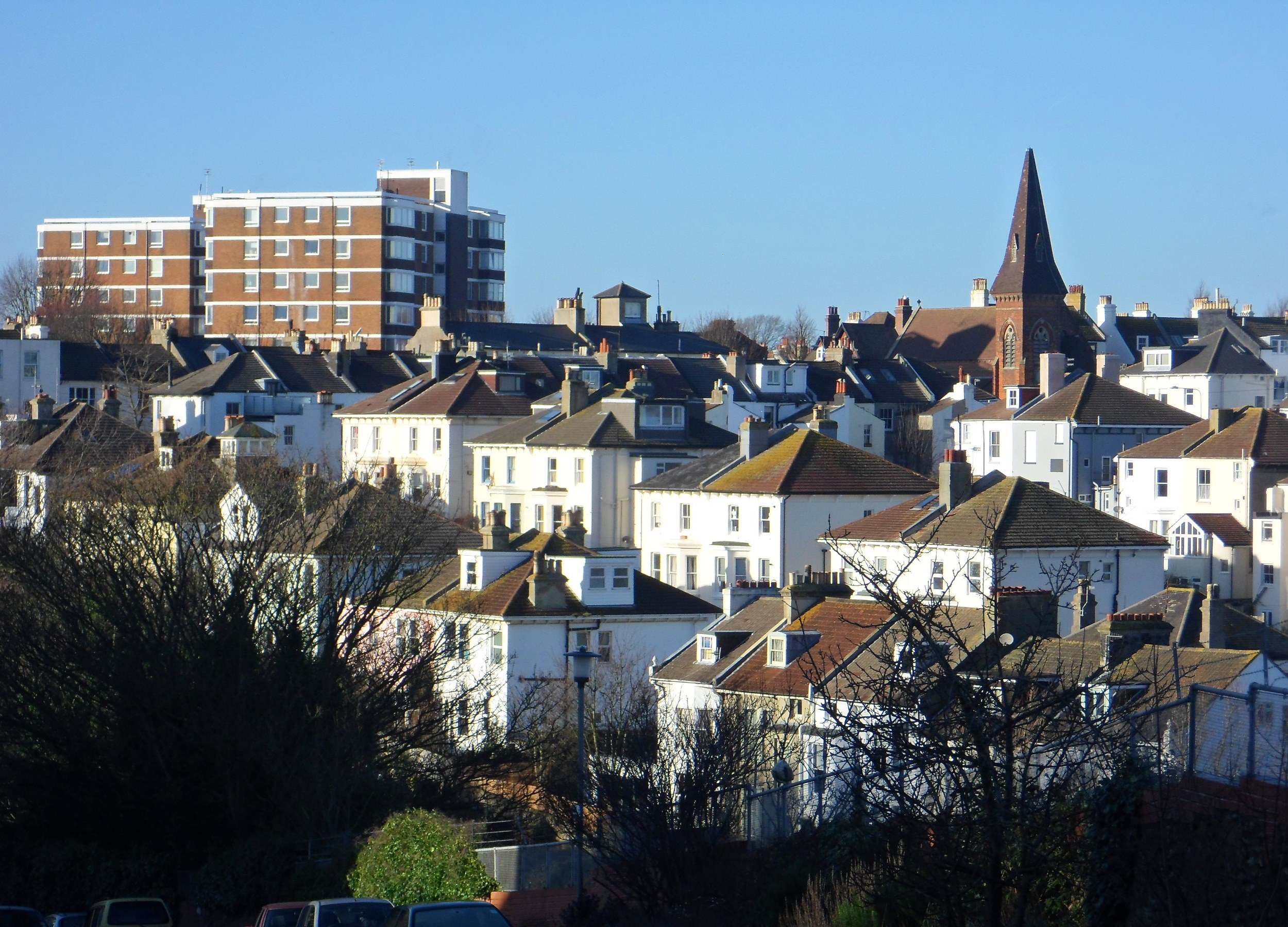
Buildings at the south end of Prestonville include late-19th-century villas, terraced houses and the red-brick St Luke's Church.

Prestonville is a largely residential area in the northwest of Brighton, part of the English city of Brighton and Hove. It covers a long, narrow and steeply sloping ridge of land between the Brighton Main Line and Dyke Road, two major transport corridors which run north-northwestwards from the centre of Brighton. Residential development started in the 1860s and spread northwards, further from central Brighton, over the next six decades. The area is characterised by middle-class and upper-middle-class housing in various styles, small-scale commercial development and long eastward views across the city. Two Anglican churches serve Prestonville—one at each end of the area—and there are several listed buildings.

Brighton and Hove City Council describe the area as a "pre-1914 residential inner suburb whose street pattern, architecture and character have been well preserved", giving a "strong sense of place". "High-quality" Victorian buildings can be found amongst the housing, and two residential streets consist of a homogeneous "railway suburb" built by the London, Brighton and South Coast Railway to rehouse people displaced from around Brighton station when the company extended its goods yard. While not successful in this aim, the estate left "a legacy of good-quality housing" which still survives.

== Location and topography ==
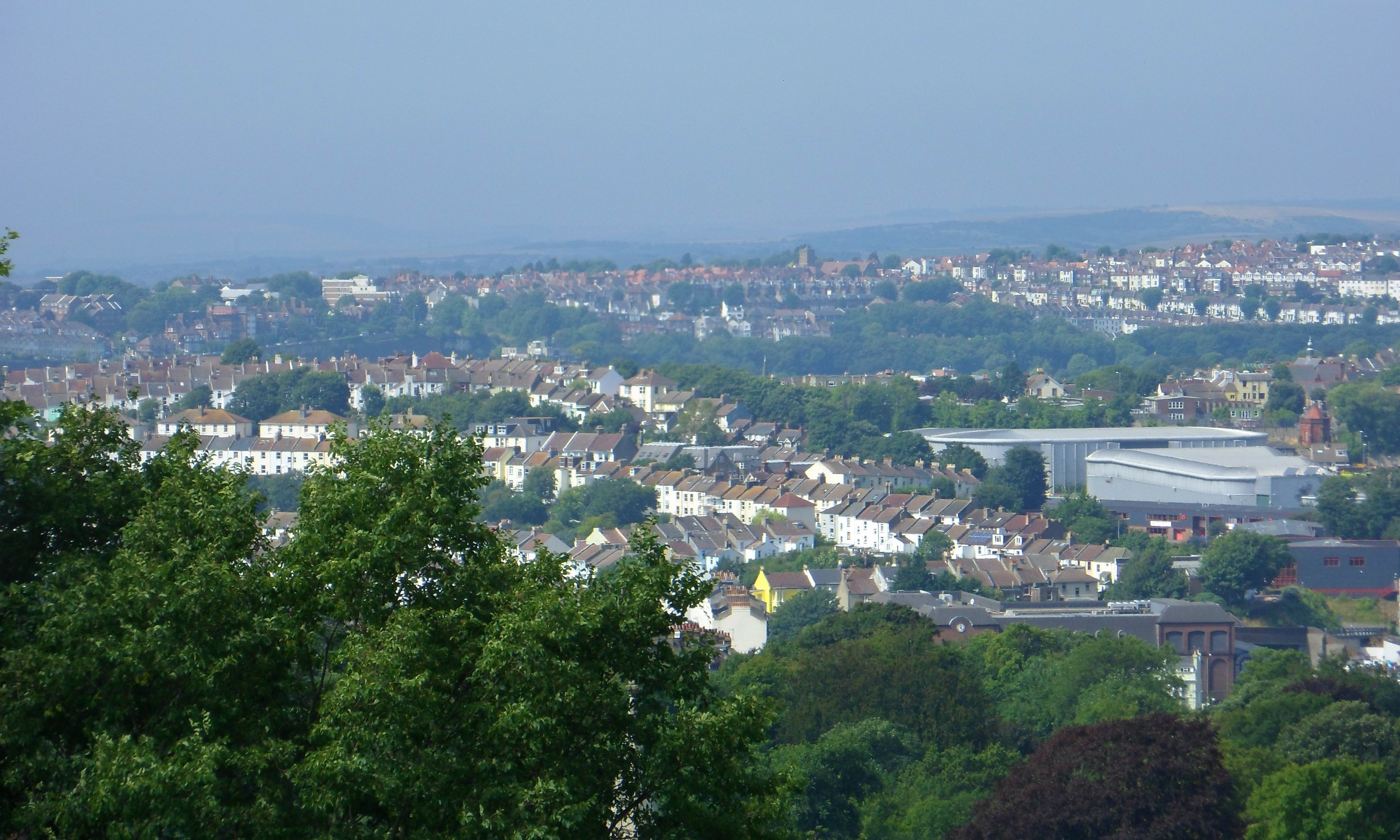
In this view from Tenantry Down, the suburb of Prestonville runs across the background below the skyline, and its position on the side of a high ridge is apparent.

Prestonville covers a sloping ridge of land on the western side of the valley through which London Road and the Brighton Main Line run. The land drops down steeply from Dyke Road, the ancient route to Devil's Dyke on the South Downs. Now one of the city's major roads, it formed the historic boundary between the parishes of Hove and Preston. Later, when Preston became part of Brighton, Dyke Road formed the border between the Boroughs of Hove and Brighton. The centre of Brighton is about 1.2 miles (2 km) to the southeast, and central Hove lies to the southwest.

Anticlockwise from the south, the boundaries of Prestonville are defined (Note: By Brighton and Hove City Council in their Urban Characterisation Study, published under the name Tivoli & Prestonville neighbourhood.) as Seven Dials, Chatham Place, Howard Place, the Brighton Main Line between Brighton and Preston Park stations, Highcroft Villas and Dyke Road. Old Shoreham Road, a major road at the southern end of Prestonville, formed the northern boundary of Brighton Borough, and therefore the boundary between Brighton and Preston parishes, until 1873.

Prestonville has good tree cover in the form of mature street-planted trees, but open space within the area is lacking; Dyke Road Park and Preston Park are nearby. Long views eastwards and southeastwards across the city can be obtained from many streets in the area, particularly in the northern section. When Prestonville was developed in the 19th century, although southern parts of the area were very close to Brighton railway station and its locomotive works, its attractiveness for residential development was not affected because the prevailing wind blew smoke and pollution in the opposite direction.

== History ==
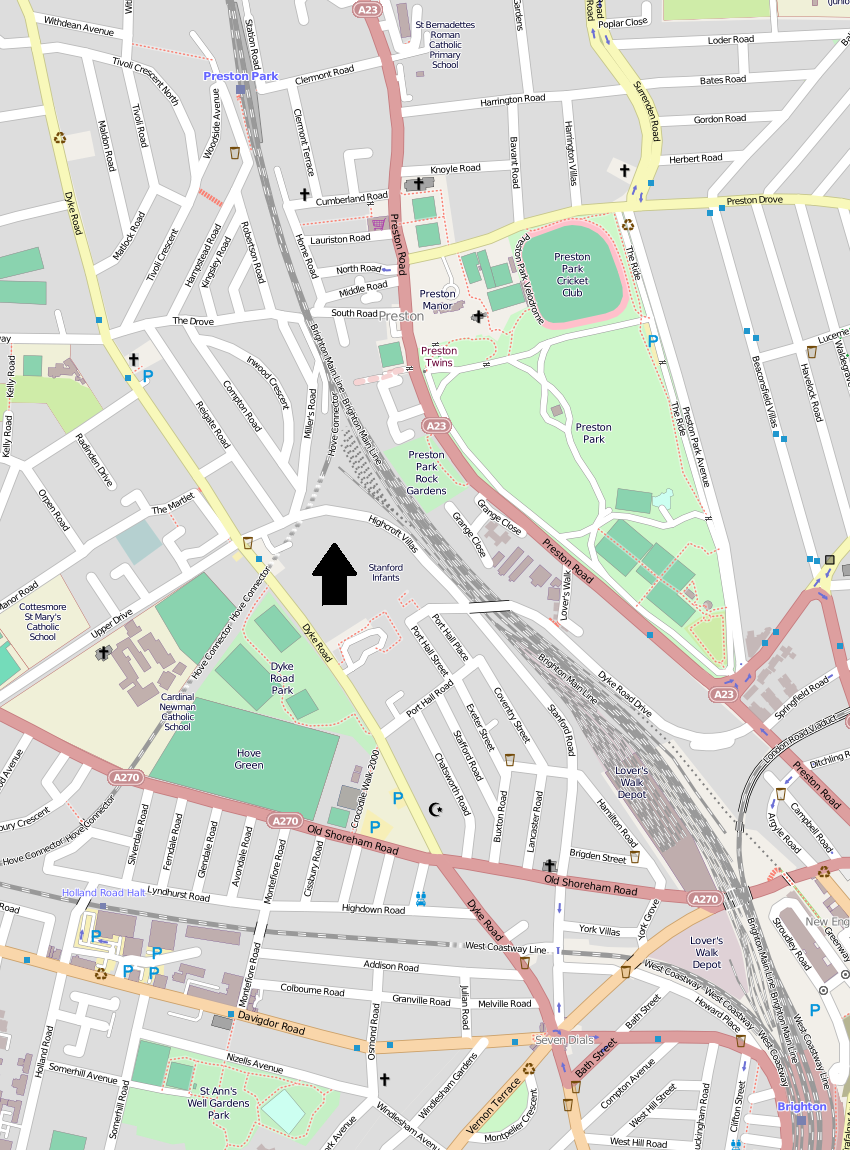
OpenStreetMap of the Prestonville area. The arrow points North.

The ancient parish of Preston, a 1,300-acre (530 ha) area of arable land cut through by the valley of the Wellesbourne, was the first parish north of both Hove and Brighton. Old Shoreham Road, now a major route through the southern part of Prestonville, formed the boundary. St Peter's Church (the old parish church) and Preston Manor were on the east side of the valley. The western boundary was formed by Dyke Road, which led to Devil's Dyke on the South Downs. Preston parish became part of the parliamentary borough of Brighton and Hove in 1868 and was added to the municipal borough of Brighton five years later as Brighton's urban development spread northwards, encouraged by its "rapid growth as Britain's premier seaside resort". Prestonville's development contributed to an increase in population in Preston parish from 756 at the time of the 1841 census to 2,470 30 years later.

The tithe map of Preston parish before it became urbanised (Note: The map cited dates from 1838.) shows that most of the land between Dyke Road and the future route of the railway line was owned by Thomas Stanford and farmed by his son Thomas junior. Thomas senior himself farmed a field in the southeast corner of present-day Prestonville, and another by the Old Shoreham Road–Dyke Road junction was owned by Sir Isaac Goldsmid, 1st Baronet. A post mill called Port Hall Mill, next to the house called Port Hall, existed between 1795 and 1887. Another mill, Preston Mill, occupied the present site of Old Mill Works in Highcroft Villas between 1797 and 1881. Before 1797 it stood on the land now occupied by Regency Square on Brighton seafront. Two paintings of 36 yoke of oxen transporting it up the hill to its new location can be found in Preston Manor. Later names for the mill included Trusler's, Black and Streeter's Mill. Waterhall Mill at Patcham contains some of the machinery salvaged when it was demolished.

The northward growth of housing into this area began in the 1840s after the opening of Brighton railway station. The West Hill and Seven Dials areas were built up with housing, then between 1848 and 1858 roads such as Chatham Place, Russell Crescent, Howard Terrace and the southern part of Prestonville Road were laid out. Old Shoreham Road had not been reached by this time, though. North of the road was an area of farmland on the west side of the Wellesbourne valley, cut off by the Brighton Main Line from Preston village, the church and the manor house. The land belonged to New England Farm, established in the 1810s south of Old Shoreham Road (therefore in the parish of Brighton), and an abattoir had been proposed to be sited there. A developer called Daniel Friend bought the land, however, and laid it out with middle-class housing from the 1860s. He bought about 6.5 acres (2.6 ha) of land from the London and Brighton Railway, who had in turn acquired it in about 1839 (just before the railway line was laid out) from William Stanford of Preston Manor. In the early days of the railways, it was common for the newly formed railway companies to buy more land than they needed and to sell the remainder for residential development.

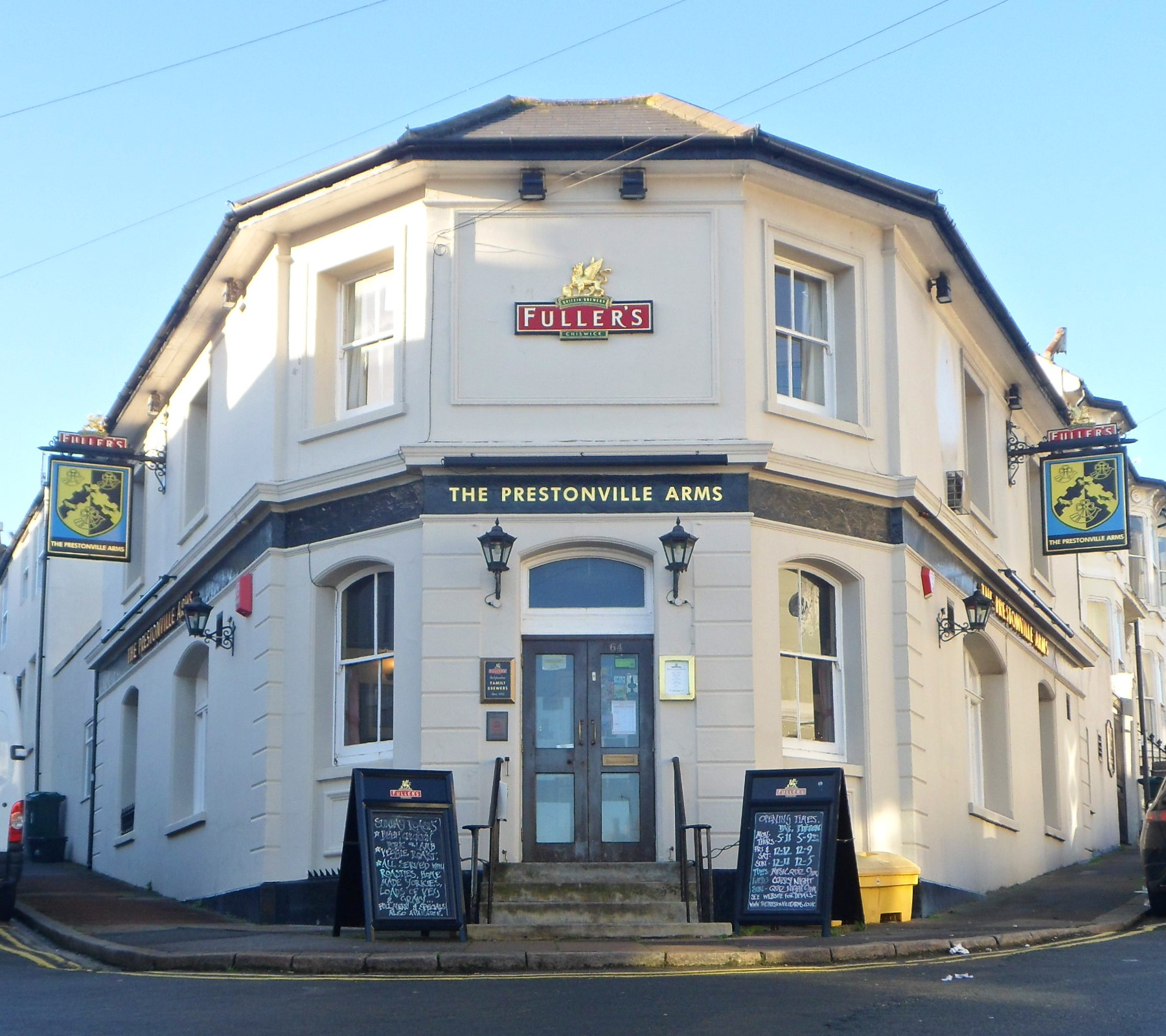
The Prestonville Arms pub is in the older southern part of Prestonville.

The earliest streets developed north of Old Shoreham Road were the northern section of Prestonville Road, Prestonville Terrace, (Note: This was renumbered as part of Old Shoreham Road in 1938.) Hamilton Road (on which stands the Prestonville Arms pub), Hamilton Terrace, Brigden Street and the lower section of Stanford Road, all of which date from between 1865 and 1869. York Grove, built on the site of the New England Farm buildings, predated these streets by about five years. (The main farmhouse, built before 1820 in a Classical style with a prominent Doric-columned porch, was retained and is numbered as 26 York Grove.) Ribbon development spread north along Dyke Road during the 1870s, reaching Highcroft Villas which was itself built up from 1880. The 1880s was a period of major development in Prestonville, as the land around an 18th-century house called Port Hall was developed with housing. Coventry Street, Exeter Street, Port Hall Street, Upper Hamilton Road and the northern part of Stanford Road date from this time. Four more roads—Buxton, Chatsworth, Lancaster and Stafford—were built during the 1890s. Further north, the roads bounded by Dyke Road, Highcroft Villas, The Drove and the railway line date from the last five years of the 19th century, and the area northwards towards Tivoli Crescent North was completed by the start of World War I. Millers Road, one of the roads from this era, was named after the former Preston Mill, as was the former Windmill Inn.

The 1871 census shows that many of the early residents of Prestonville were railway workers based at Brighton station or the nearby Brighton railway works; other occupations included schoolteachers, managers, a tax inspector, a retired admiral, a bookseller and a draper's assistant. Two houses on Hamilton Road were used as an orphans' home and a private school respectively. At this time, much of the housing was rented, and "a move from one street to the next could represent a climb in social status". In ascending order of social position at this time were Brigden Street, Prestonville Terrace, Hamilton Road and Stanford Road.

Many of the houses on Compton Road and Inwood Crescent were built by the London, Brighton and South Coast Railway (LBSCR) soon after 1900 to house families displaced from the streets around Brighton station. In 1898, the LBSCR received permission to compulsorily purchase 171 houses and demolish them to allow Brighton station goods yard to be expanded. Clearance of the site took place between 1901 and 1904. The company bought some houses privately as well, bringing the total number of displaced households to 225. The Act of Parliament (Note: The LBSCR Act 1898.) which permitted the compulsory purchasing obliged the LBSCR to rehouse the people elsewhere in Brighton, based on the terms of the Housing of the Working Classes Act 1890 upon which it was based. The company bought land from the trustees of the Stanford estate in 1901 and 1903 for £5,600 and erected 123 houses and flats of various styles. They were of good quality and were larger than the terraced houses they replaced, but as a rehousing scheme the development failed because very few of the displaced people actually moved there. The houses were still owned by the railways (latterly by British Railways) until 1965.

On 25 May 1943, during the Brighton Blitz, four houses on Compton Road were bombed and one resident died. Postwar flats occupy the site of numbers 20–26. Another bomb just missed Highcroft Villas, landing on the railway line below. The Prestonville area saw little change after the war, although some other houses were demolished in favour of blocks of flats. An example was the former Hove Villa, built in 1840 on Old Shoreham Road but in institutional use from 1899 (first as a psychiatric hospital, then as a private school). It was demolished in 1972 and twin blocks of flats called Prestonville Court were built in its place.

== Demographics and community ==
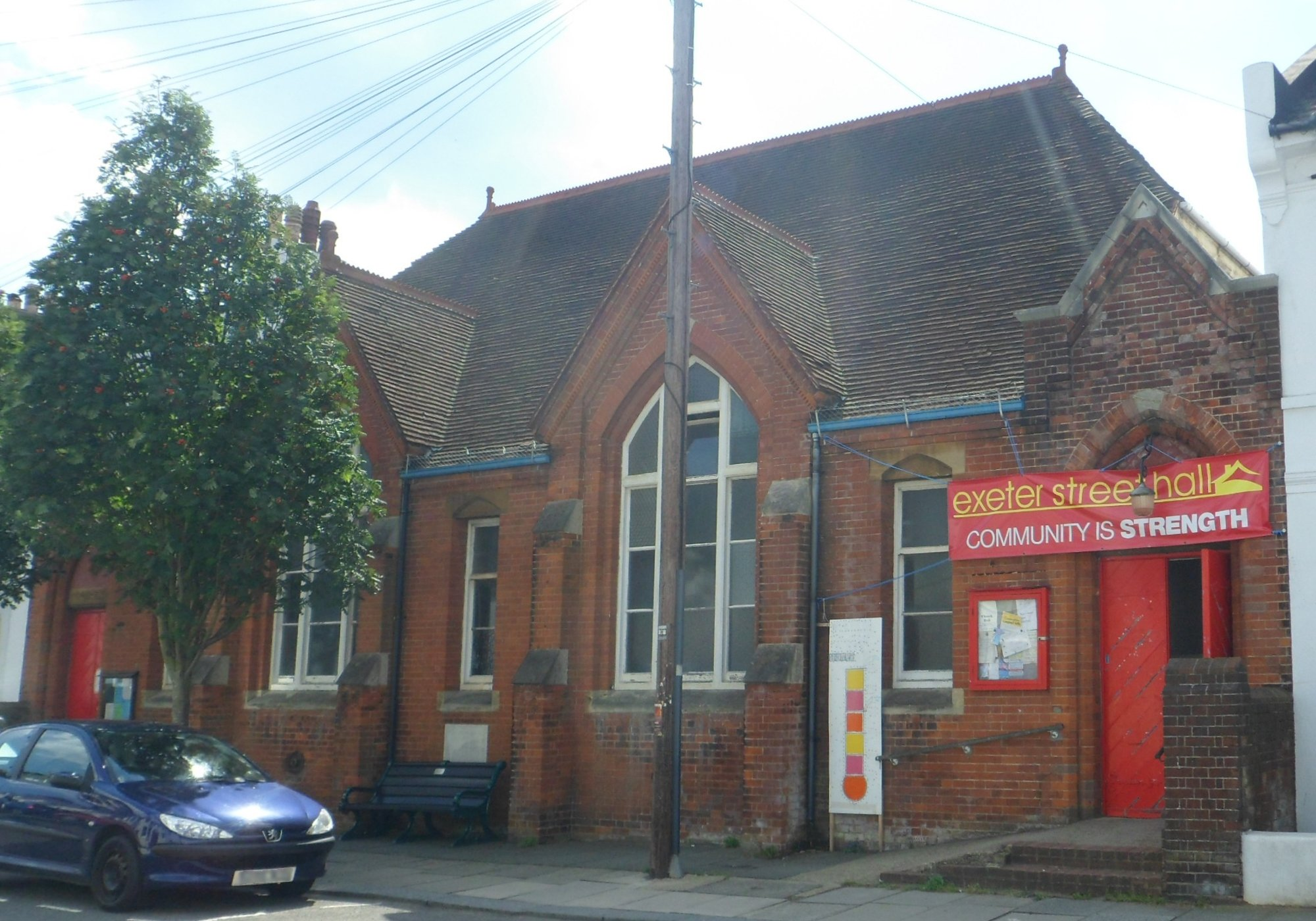
Exeter Street Hall, formerly the church hall of St Luke's, was bought in 2012 by Prestonville residents in order to secure it as a resource for the community.

At the time of the United Kingdom Census 2001, Prestonville's population was estimated at 5,616 and a housing density of 56 dwellings per hectare was calculated. Of the housing stock, 31% is terraced housing, 8% semi-detached, 8% detached and 53% flats of various types. Flats in converted houses are prevalent in the area. In terms of tenure, in 2001 66% of dwellings were owned and 34% were rented, mostly from private landlords. According to the council's demographic classification system, the highest proportions of households are defined as "suburban privately renting professionals" (24%), "affluent urban professional flats" (21%) and "young educated worker flats" (14%).

For the purposes of local governance, Prestonville is in Preston Park ward, one of the 23 local government wards in the city of Brighton and Hove. As of August 2024, Preston Park ward was represented by two Green Party councillors and one Labour Party councillor.

The Prestonville Community Association is a local community and action group. In 2012, when St Luke's Church put Exeter Street Hall up for sale, members of the community formed an industrial and provident society to "secure [it] as community resource for the residents of Prestonville" by buying, refurbishing and promoting it. The company offered to sell shares in the building to residents and other interested parties.

Prestonville is served by Stanford Junior School, but the nearest pre-school facilities are a mile away and there is no secondary school in the area: it lies within the catchment area of Dorothy Stringer School and Varndean School.

== Buildings ==
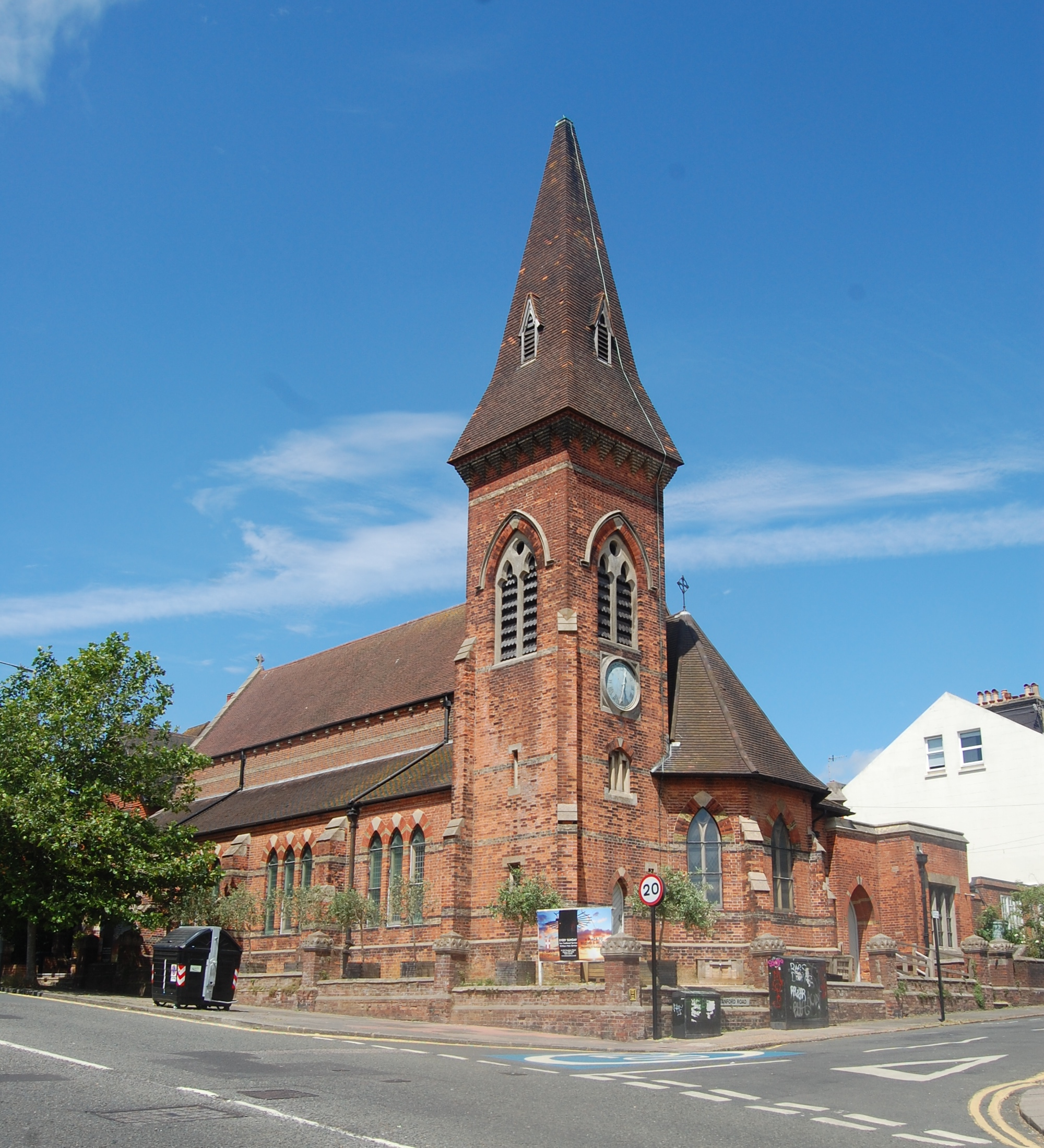
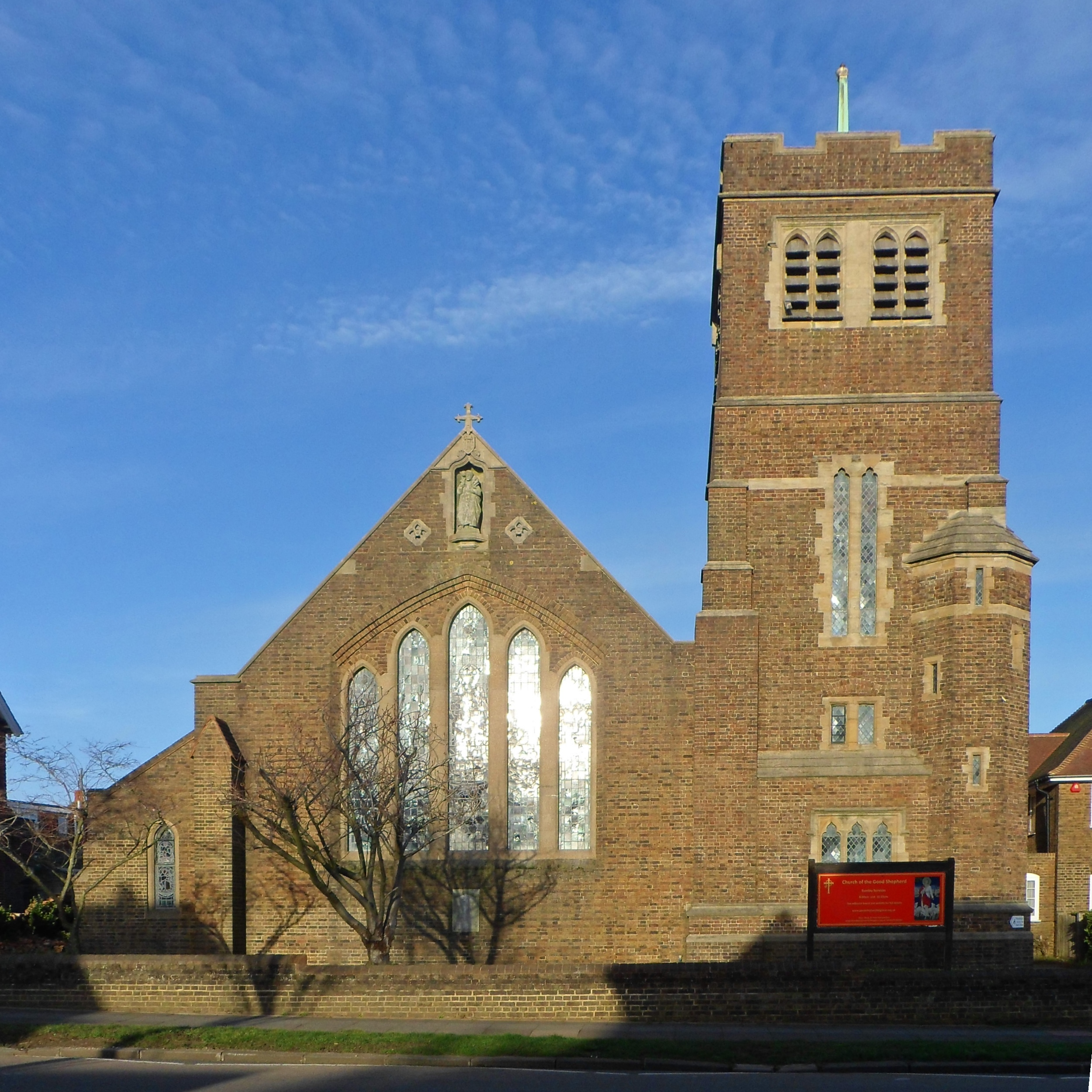
St Luke's Church (left) and the Church of the Good Shepherd serve Prestonville.

St Luke's Church (50.833559°N 0.147597°W) occupies a "landmark" position at the junction of Old Shoreham Road and Stanford Road in the south of Prestonville, near Seven Dials. This Anglican church was built in 1875 to the design of John Hill. Its Gothic Revival church hall on Exeter Street dates from 1884 and retains its original red-brick exterior. The Church of the Good Shepherd (50.841733°N 0.157902°W) is at the junction of Dyke Road and The Drove in the north of Prestonville. It was built between 1920 and 1922 and was designed by Edward Prioleau Warren. Both the church and the small brick walls surrounding it are Grade II-listed. It is a brown-brick building in a late and "simple" interpretation of the Gothic Revival style. The tower and an extra bay to the nave were added in 1925–27, and the church hall was opened by George Tryon, 1st Baron Tryon on 15 July 1936. The church was funded as a memorial to former Vicar of Preston Rev. Gerald Moor. The Al-Quds Mosque (50.834691°N 0.150736°W) was founded in the 1970s when a group of Muslims who were visiting the area donated money to fund an Islamic centre and mosque. The community bought a converted house which had been used as a nursery school.

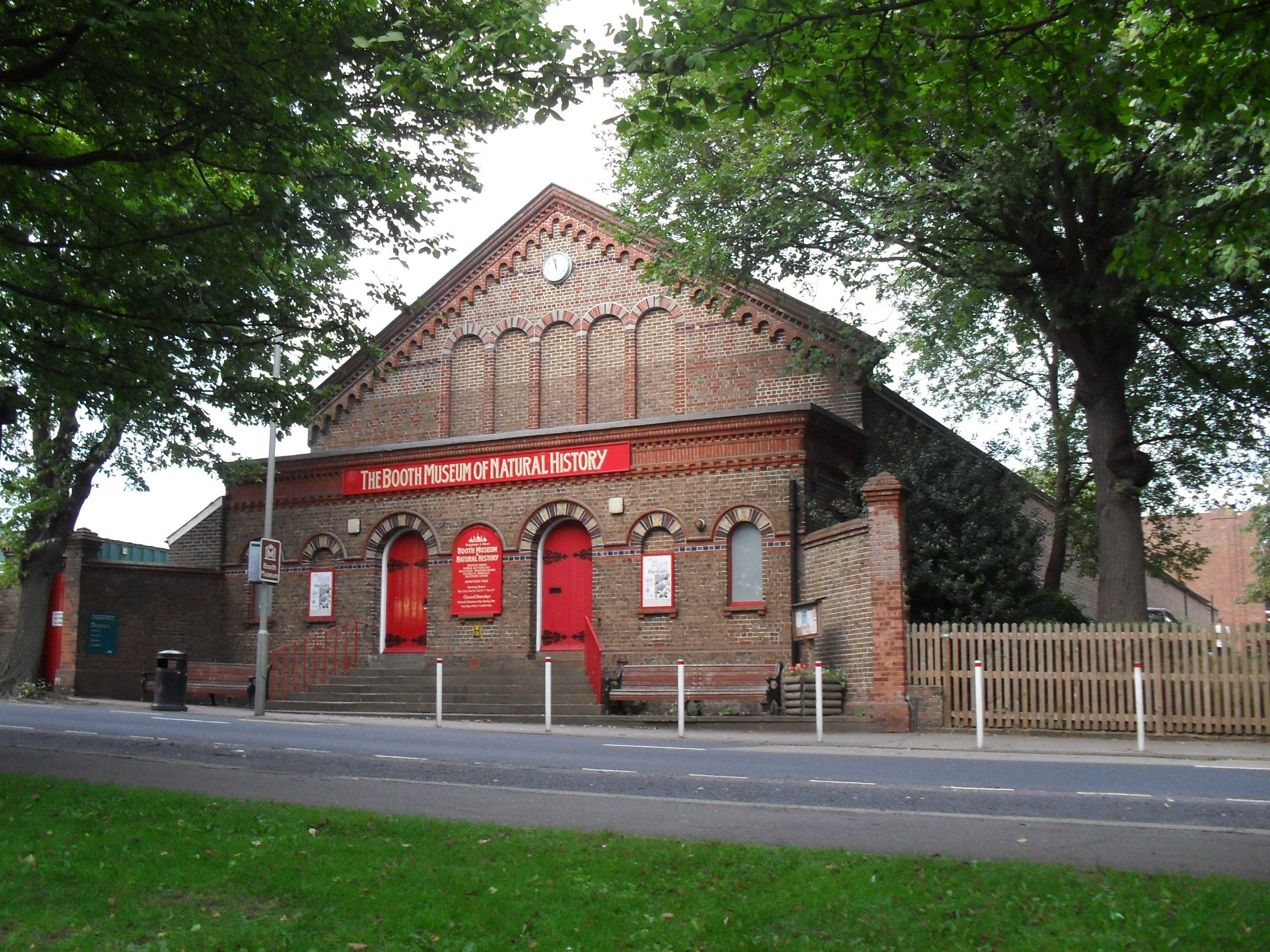
The Booth Museum of Natural History dates from 1874.

Two other Grade II-listed buildings are located further south on Dyke Road. The Booth Museum of Natural History was built in 1874 to house the extensive collection of British birds, insects and other specimens collected by naturalist Edward Booth. It originally stood in the grounds of his home, Bleak House, and became a museum in 1890. Many more collections have been added to the stock of over half a million specimens, and in 1998 the museum was designated as a "collection of national importance". Architecturally, the long, low, shed-like building has an Italianate/Romanesque Revival exterior with polychrome brickwork. Set into a full-width brick porch are two arched doorways with voussoirs. (Bleak House itself was demolished c. 1939; flats called Elm Court and Fairways occupy the site.) At the junction of Port Hall Road and Dyke Road is Port Hall, a double-fronted house dating from the early 19th century. Prominent four-centred arches surround the doorway and the windows, and above the first floor runs a parapet with battlements and a frieze. The name port hall is set into a panel on the parapet.

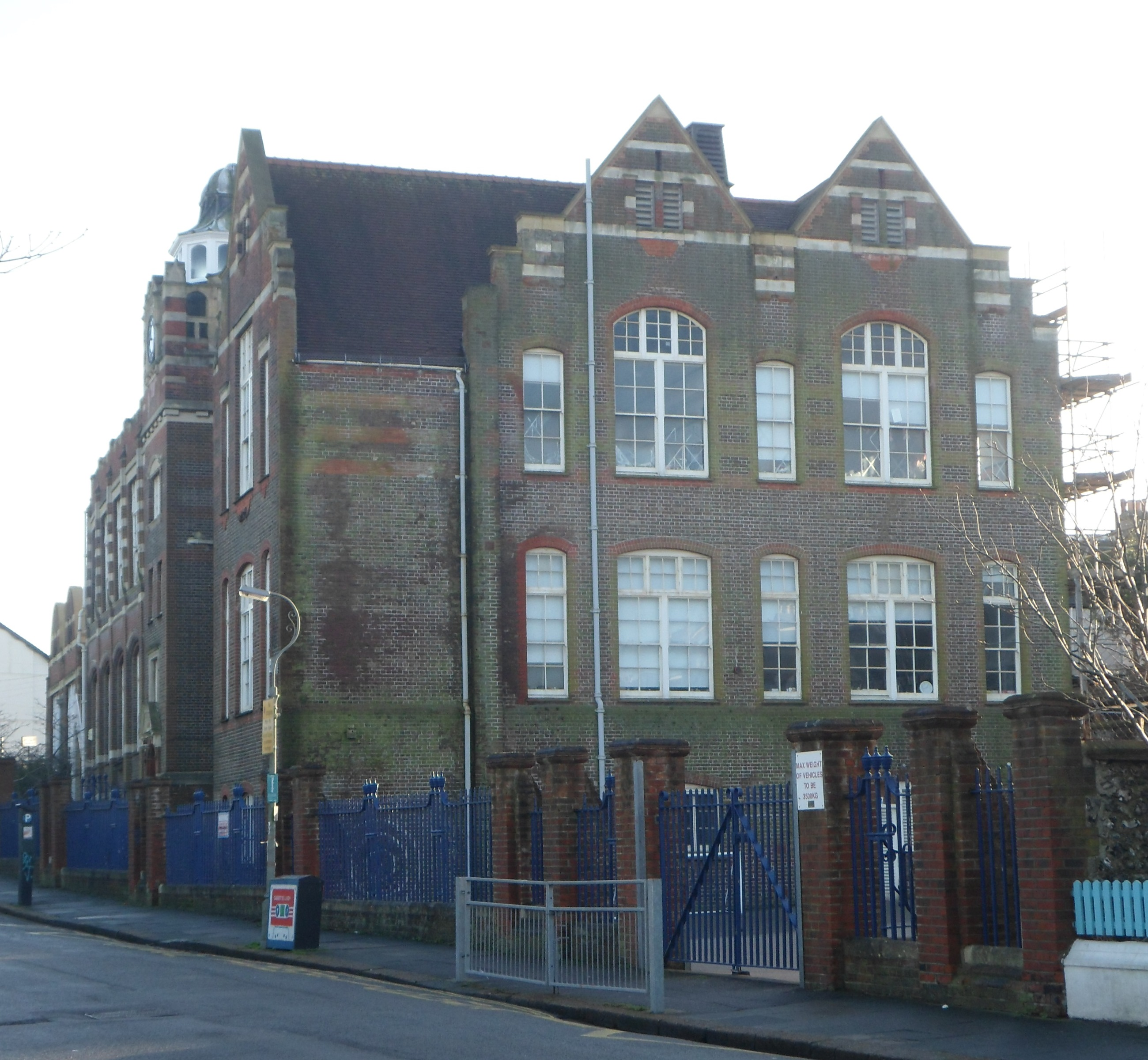
Stanford Road School is a former board school.

Prestonville has two educational buildings of architectural interest. The Grade II-listed Stanford Road School, a primary school which was built in 1893 as one of "a distinguished group of board schools" designed by Thomas Simpson and his son Gilbert Murray Simpson for the Brighton and Preston School Board. The exterior is lavish, featuring brown and red brick, stone, tile and render, elaborate arched windows, many gables, a clock tower and a wooden bell-cot; and the interior "retains its original plan and detailed features". At the corner of Old Shoreham Road and Dyke Road is the Brighton Hove & Sussex Sixth Form College (BHASVIC), which is on Brighton and Hove City Council's register of locally listed buildings. The "splendid" former grammar school was designed by London architect S.B. Russell in 1913, extended in 1934–35 by John Leopold Denman, and made DDA-compliant in 2005 with some "adroitly, boldly handled" access ramps designed by Nick Evans Architects. It is a Neo-Georgian/Queen Anne-style complex with extensive red brickwork and wings joined to a central section by a series of staircases lit by round windows), and occupies a prominent corner site. It retains its original iron gates with the emblems of Hove and Brighton Boroughs and East and West Sussex.

The Quebec Army Reserve Centre at 198 Dyke Road is home to the B (Royal Sussex) Company of the Princess of Wales's Royal Regiment. There is also an Army Cadet Force hut on the premises at which the Brighton detachment of the Army Cadet Force meets. The Quebec Army Reserve Centre was built during World War II as an army drill hall; after the war the Territorial Army moved out of their smaller accommodation in central Brighton and it became their headquarters.

== Transport ==
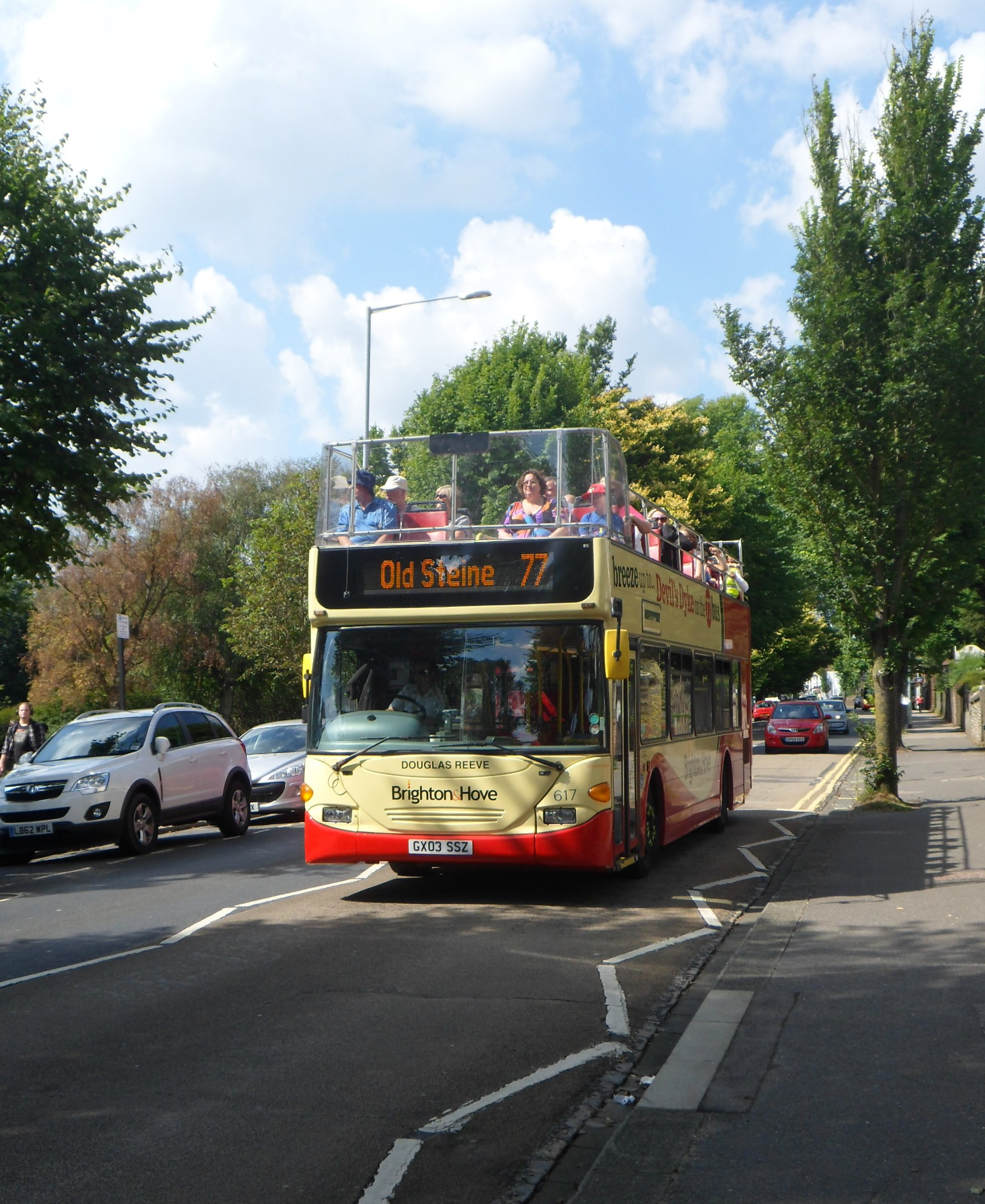
A Route 77 service operated by an open top bus travels southwards down Dyke Road in August 2013.

Prestonville has convenient access to rail services. Brighton railway station is near the southeast corner of the area. Its dramatically curving train shed can be seen from some of the nearby terraced streets. At the northeast corner of the area is Preston Park railway station, the first station outside Brighton on the main line to London. There is a rear entrance to the station at the junction of Woodside Avenue and Tivoli Crescent North. The railway line runs at a much lower level below the ridge and forms the eastern boundary of the Prestonville area.

Bus routes operated by the Brighton & Hove Bus Company operate along Dyke Road. Route 27 runs between Westdene and Saltdean via Brighton station, Old Steine and Rottingdean. Some services on routes 14 and 14C run along Dyke Road on their journeys between Hangleton and Peacehaven. The weekend-only route 77 service between Brighton Pier and Devil's Dyke runs approximately every 45 minutes along the whole length of Dyke Road. Bus journeys to the centre of Brighton take around 10 minutes.

Car ownership in Prestonville is lower than the city average, and the proportion of people who walk to work is 22%. Dyke Road is often congested at peak times, and the section of Old Shoreham Road running through the New England railway bridge is another pinch point. Links to the east across the railway line are poor: other than the bridge at the south end of the area, there is the Dyke Road Drive overbridge near the centre and a narrow tunnel towards the north.

When Brighton and Hove City Council introduced the first phase of the city's 20 mph zones in April 2013, the southern part of Prestonville as far north as Highcroft Villas was included and therefore became subject to this speed limit. The rest of Prestonville, except Dyke Road, is to be included in Phase 2.

== People associated with Prestonville ==
Inventor Magnus Volk lived at 128 Dyke Road towards the end of his life. Sculptor and artist Eric Gill was born at 32 Hamilton Road in 1882 and spent his childhood nearby at 53 Highcroft Villas. Theatre manager Charles B. Cochran was born at 15 Prestonville Road in 1872.

== Gallery ==
Examples of housing in Prestonville

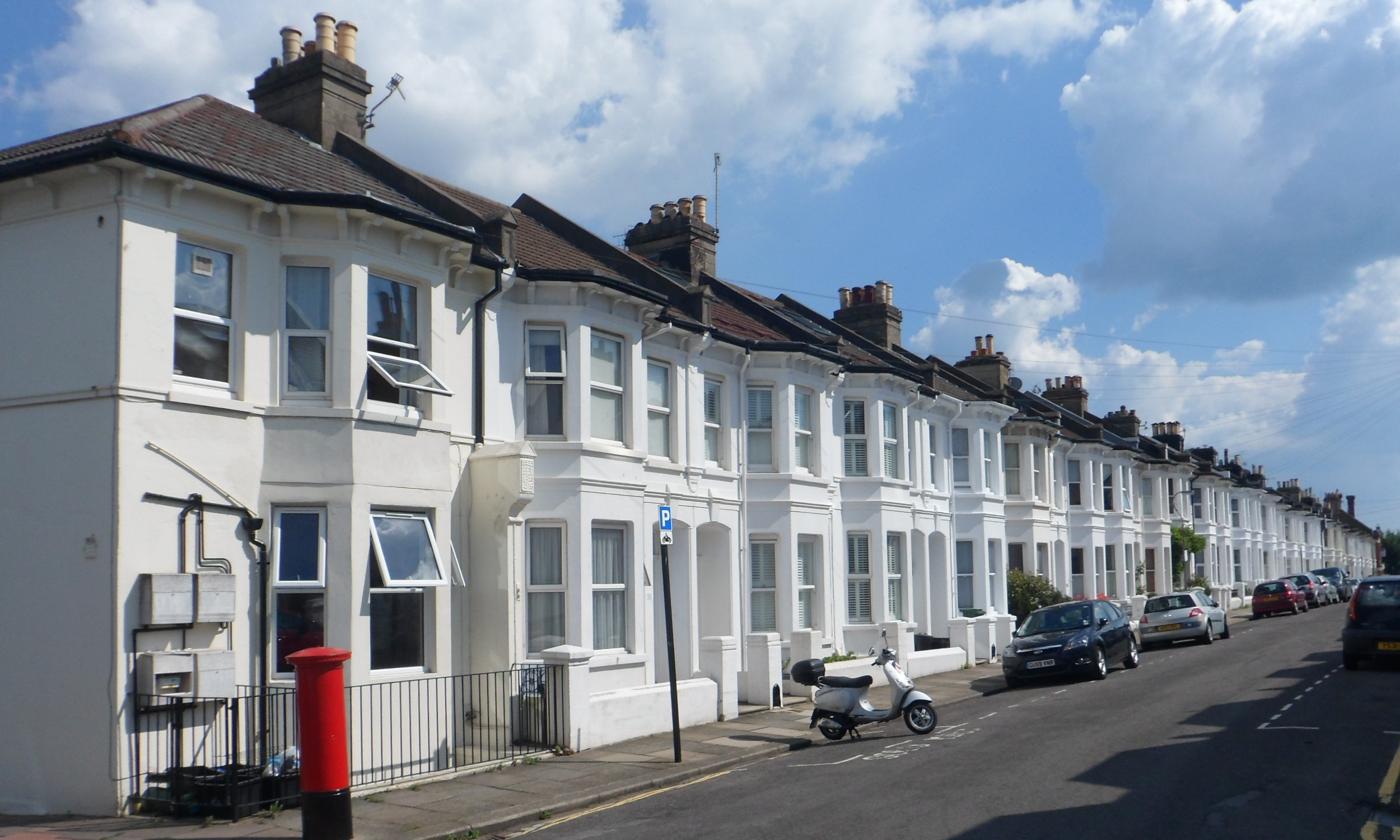
Terraced housing on Exeter Street

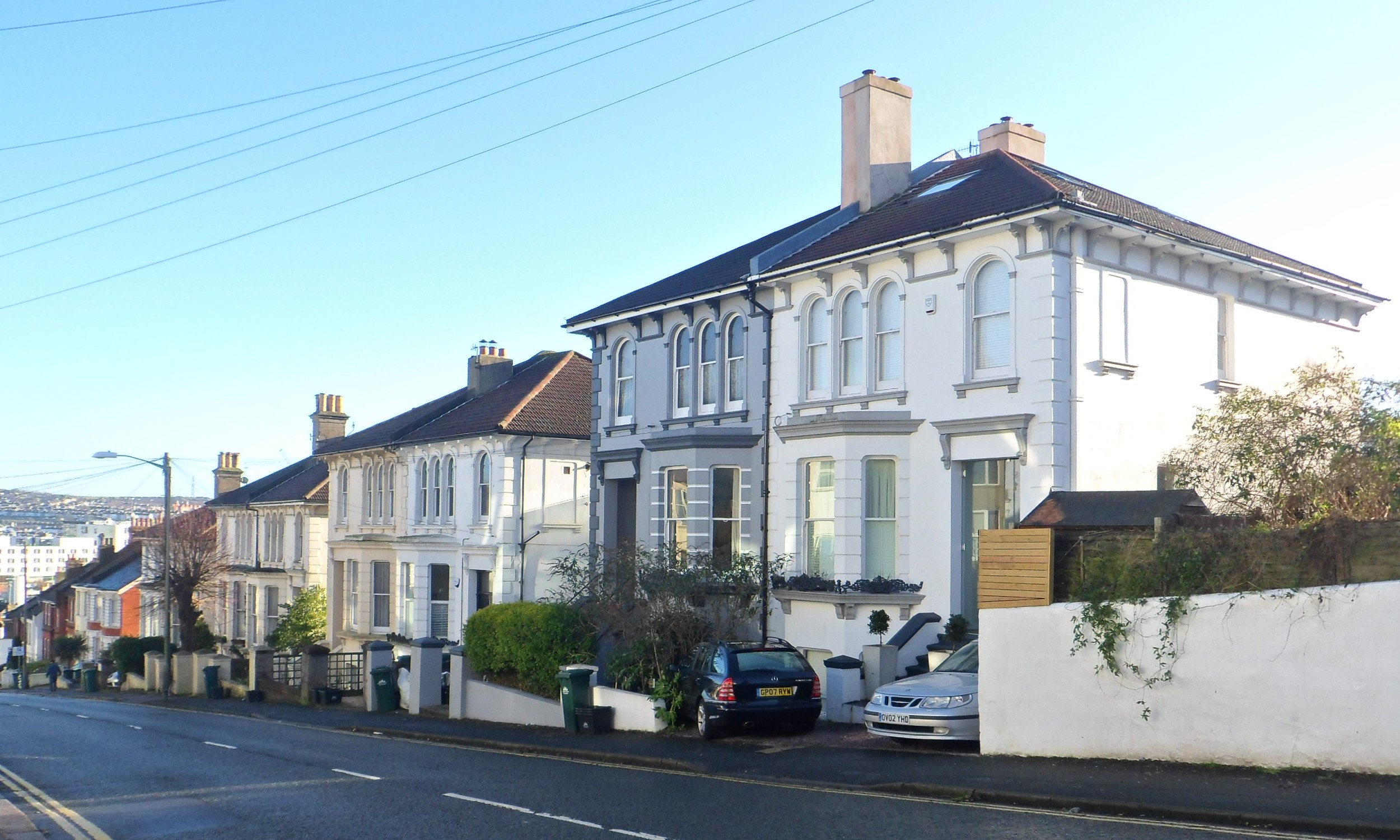
Villas on Old Shoreham Road (south side)

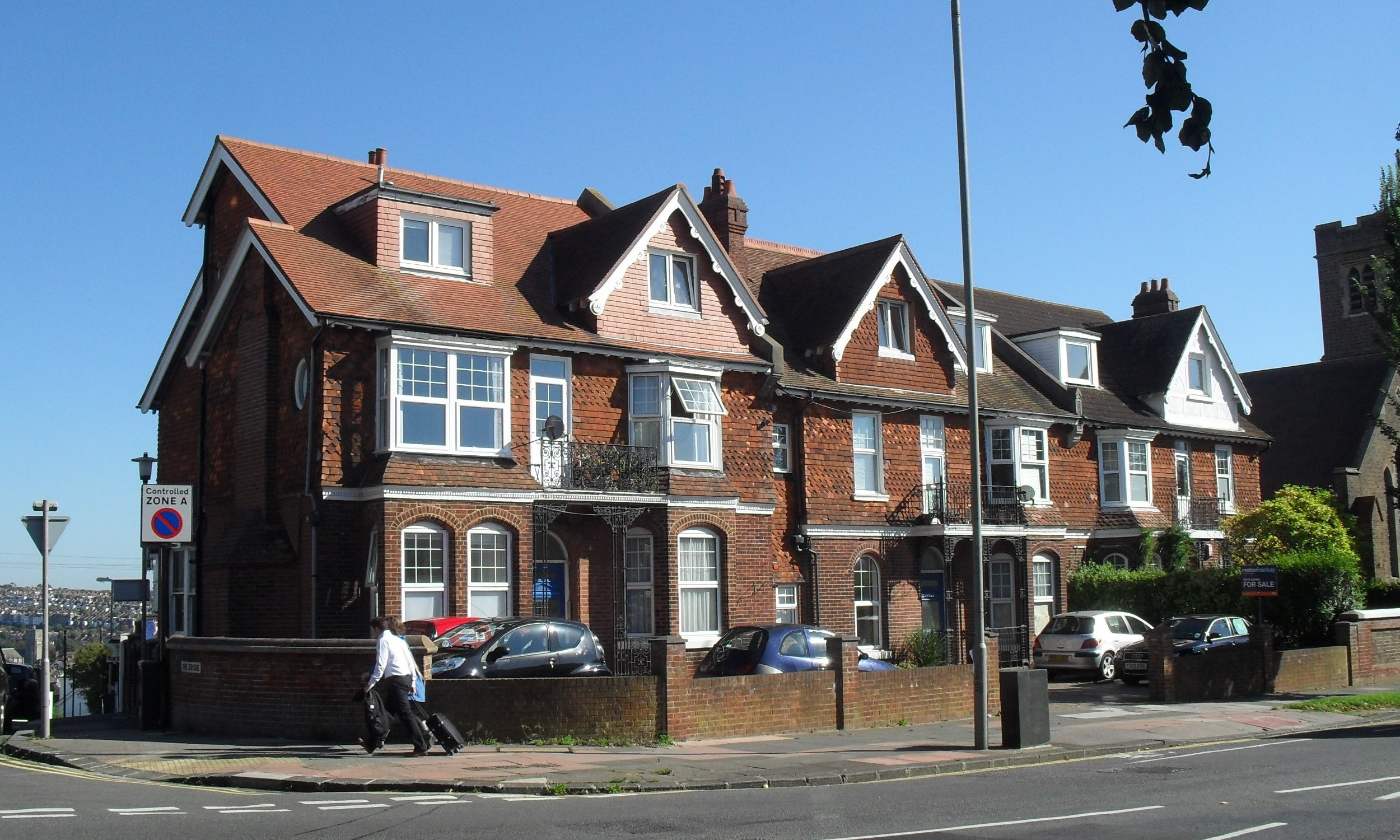
Edwardian houses at Dyke Road–The Drove junction

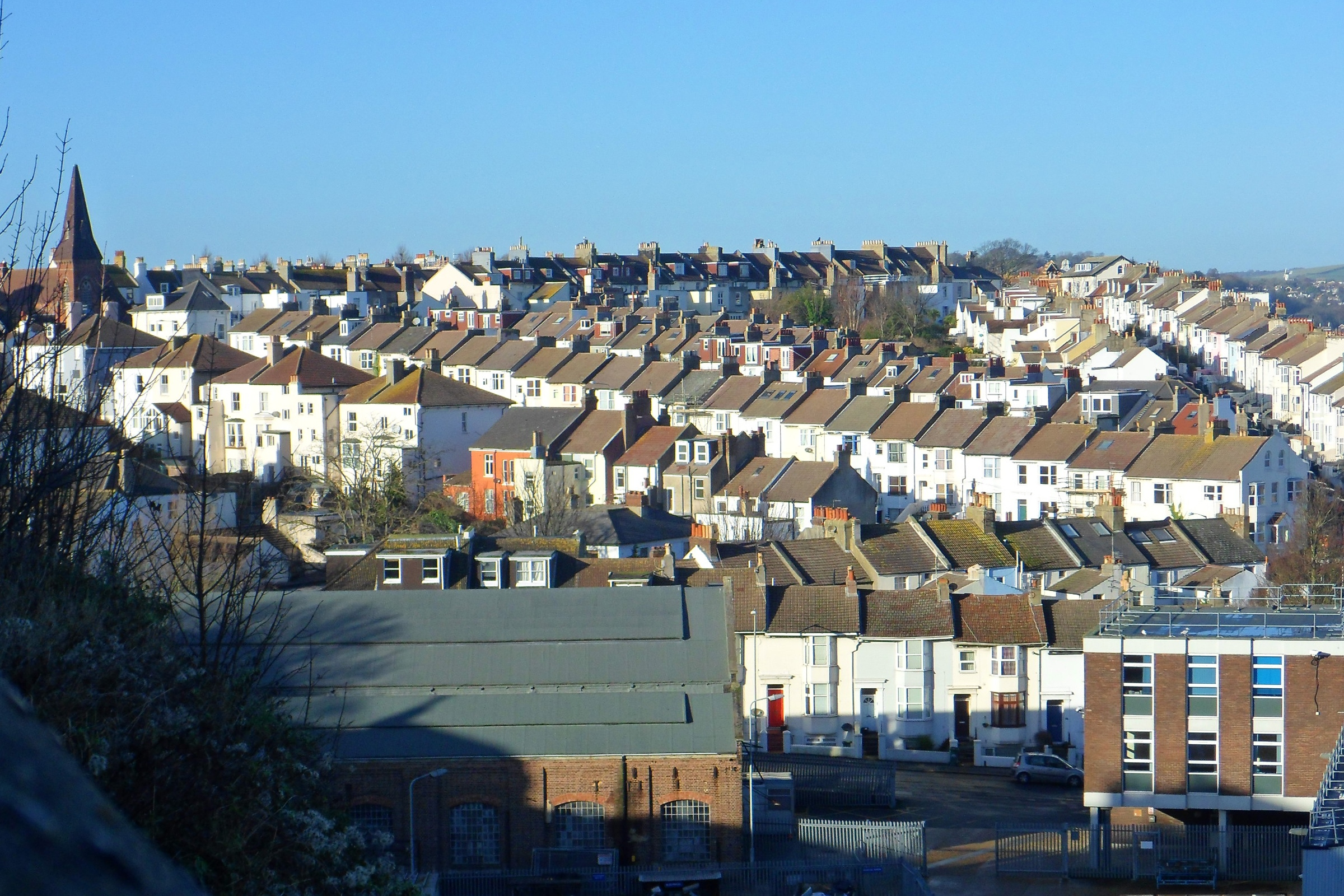
The southern part of Prestonville

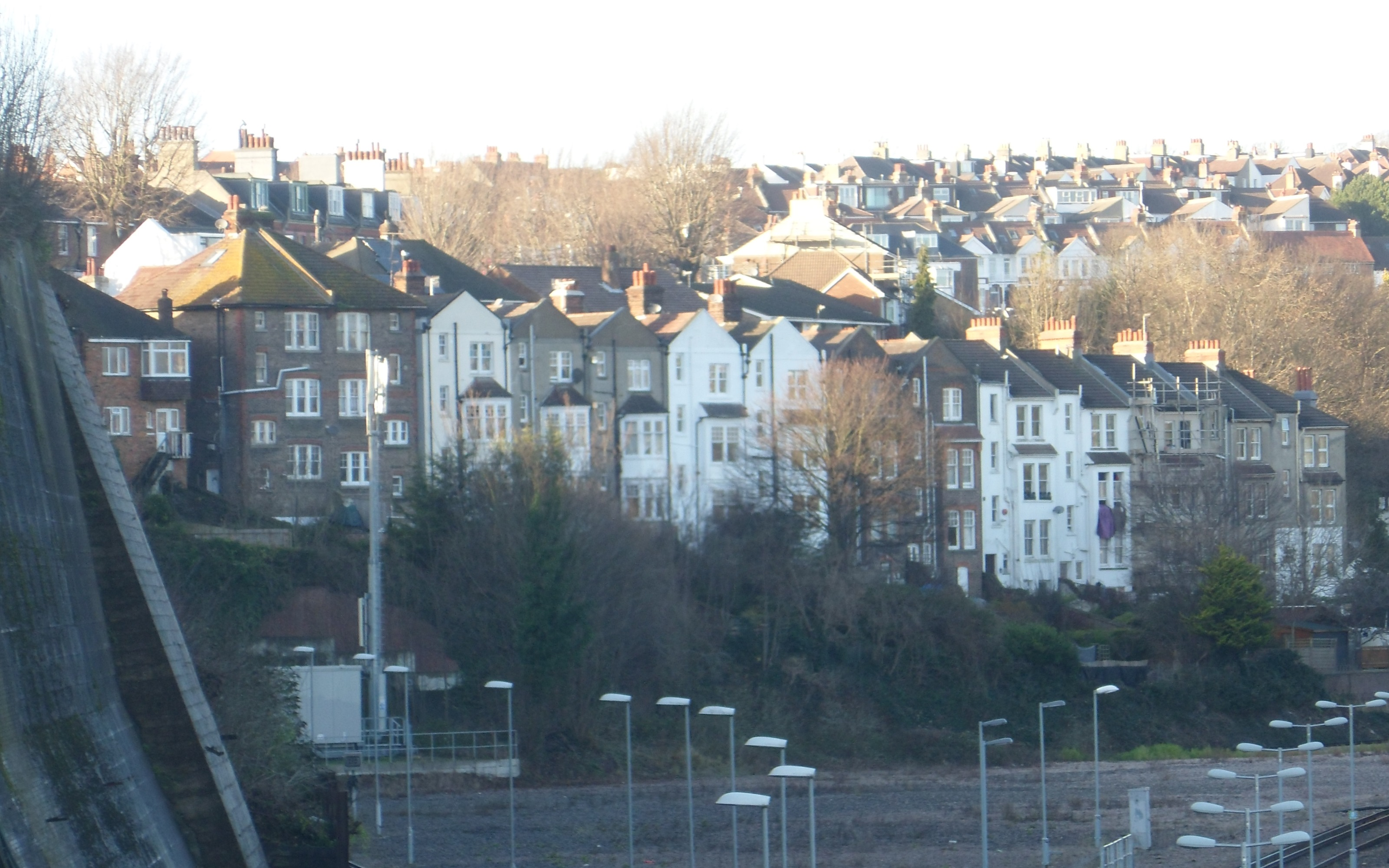
Millers Road, backing on to the railway

== See also ==
- List of places of worship in Brighton and Hove
- Media related to Prestonville, Brighton at Wikimedia Commons

== Bibliography ==
- Antram, Nicholas; Morrice, Richard (2008). Brighton and Hove. Pevsner Architectural Guides. London: Yale University Press. ISBN 978-0-300-12661-7.
- Antram, Nicholas; Pevsner, Nikolaus (2013). Sussex: East with Brighton and Hove. The Buildings of England. London: Yale University Press. ISBN 978-0-300-18473-0.
- Carder, Timothy (1990). The Encyclopaedia of Brighton. Lewes: East Sussex County Libraries. ISBN 0-861-47315-9.
- Collis, Rose (2010). The New Encyclopaedia of Brighton. (based on the original by Tim Carder) (1st ed.). Brighton: Brighton & Hove Libraries. ISBN 978-0-9564664-0-2.
- Farrant, Sue (1985). Changes in Brighton and Hove's Suburbs: Preston and Patcham 1841–1871. Hove: Dr S. Farrant. ISBN 0-9510225-0-4.
- Middleton, Judy (2002). The Encyclopaedia of Hove & Portslade. Brighton: Brighton & Hove Libraries.
- Preston Village Millennium Project (2004). Preston: Downland Village to Brighton Suburb. Brighton: Brighton Books Publishing. ISBN 1-901454-07-X.
- Roberts, David (2006). "A failed rehousing scheme in Brighton by the London Brighton and South Coast Railway". Sussex Archaeological Collections. 144. Lewes: Sussex Archaeological Society: 191–201. doi:10.5284/1086588.
- Rowland, David (1997). The Brighton Blitz. Seaford: S.B. Publications. ISBN 1-85770-124-0.
