= Thomas Simpson (architect, born 1825) =

British architect

- Born: 1825; Scotland
- Died: 1908 (aged 82–83)
- Occupation: Architect
- Practice: Thomas Simpson & Son
- Buildings: Dials Congregational Church, Brighton (demolished)
- Projects: Schools for Brighton and Preston School Board

Thomas Simpson (1825–1908) was a British architect associated with the seaside town of Brighton. As architect to the Brighton and Preston School Board and the equivalent institution in neighbouring Hove, he designed "a distinguished group of board schools" during the late 19th century, when the provision of mass education was greatly extended. Many of these schools survive and some have listed status. He also worked on five Nonconformist chapels for various Christian denominations, using a wide variety of materials and architectural styles. He was the father of Sir John William Simpson and Gilbert Murray Simpson, who both became architects.

== Biography ==
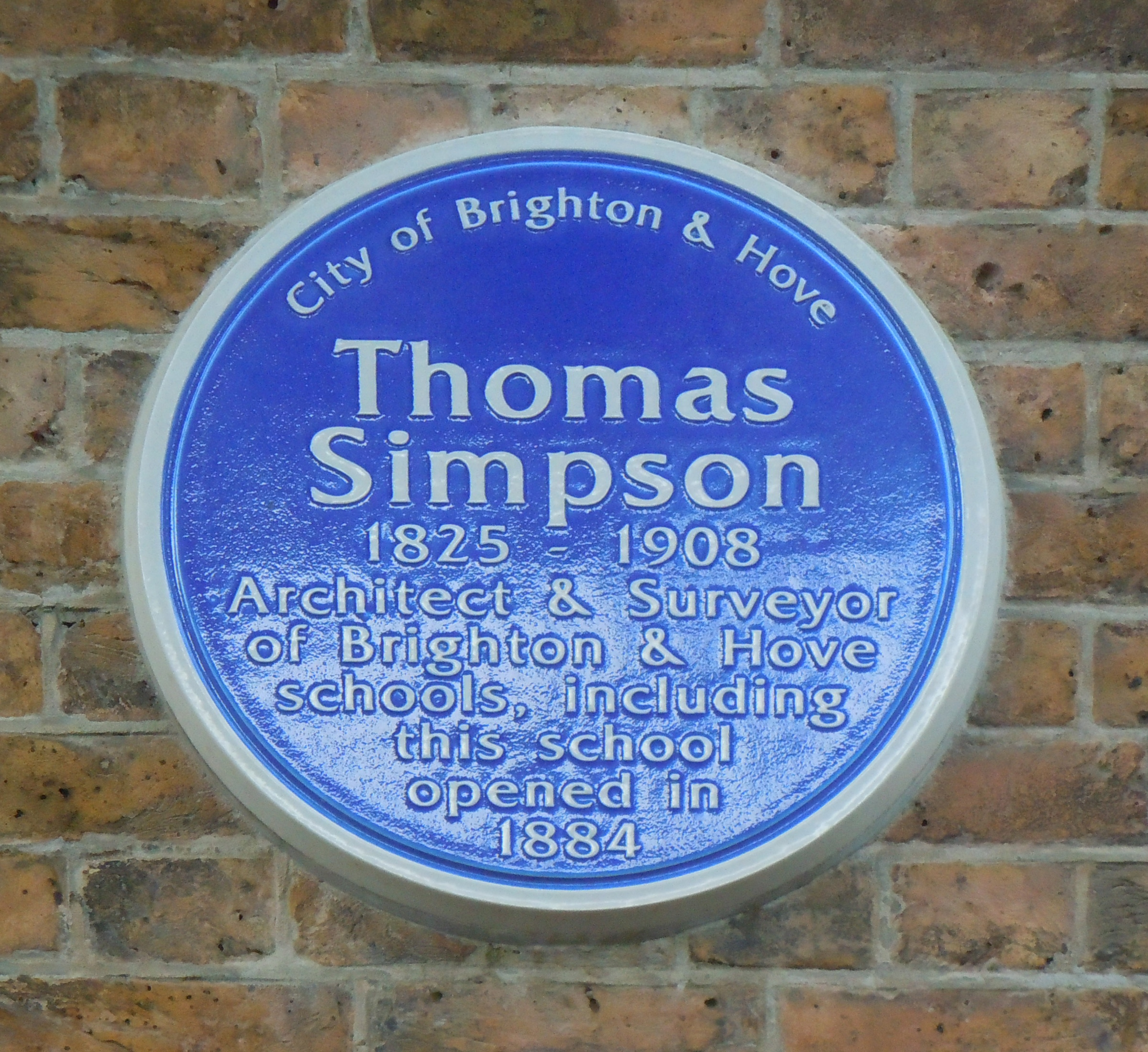
A blue plaque commemorating Simpson was erected in Hove in 2015.

Simpson was born in 1825 in Scotland, where he trained as an architect. After travelling in Germany, he later moved to Brighton and he started his professional career articled to James Charnock Simpson, his uncle. He married Clara Hart and had two sons: John William Simpson (born in 1858) and Gilbert Murray Simpson (1869). They both had long architectural careers: John, who designed public buildings and monuments across Britain, was articled to his father in 1875, as was Gilbert in 1886.

Early in his career, Simpson travelled around and studied in Germany—whose approach to mass education and the architecture of its buildings informed his later work on board schools—and later worked alongside Joseph Butler, an architect who specialised in churches. At the time Butler was working in Chichester and was employed as surveyor to Chichester Cathedral. Simpson then became William Butterfield's assistant at his architectural firm in London. After another period working for his uncle, he started his own architectural practice and by 1868 had his office at 16 Ship Street in The Lanes. He entered into a partnership with Henry Branch, and later took on Gilbert as a full partner after he had served his apprenticeship (the practice was known as Thomas Simpson & Son from 1890.)

As well as his completed works on schools and chapels, Simpson was involved with one unexecuted scheme in Brighton. During the period he was in partnership with Henry Branch, they submitted the winning entry for the competition to design a clock tower for an important road junction in central Brighton. Nothing came of their 1881 scheme, though, and the Jubilee Clock Tower was eventually built to the design of a different architect, John Johnson, in 1888. The Building News of 22 July 1881 published plans and a sketch of Simpson and Branch's proposal and gave a full description. Public toilets would have been placed beneath the main tower of the squat four-sided structure, which was to have been of Portland stone with some granite work. The clock stage of the tower would have been ironwork, and the upper section would have been copper-clad timber. The report also stated that Simpson's working address at the time was 63 High Street, Brighton.

In September 2014, conservation group The Brighton Society applied for planning permission to erect a commemorative blue plaque on the Connaught Road School in Hove, one of Simpson's buildings. Hove Civic Society and the Brighton and Hove Heritage Commission were also involved in funding the plaque. In April 2015 The Brighton Society announced the unveiling would take place later that month.

== Works ==
=== Schools ===
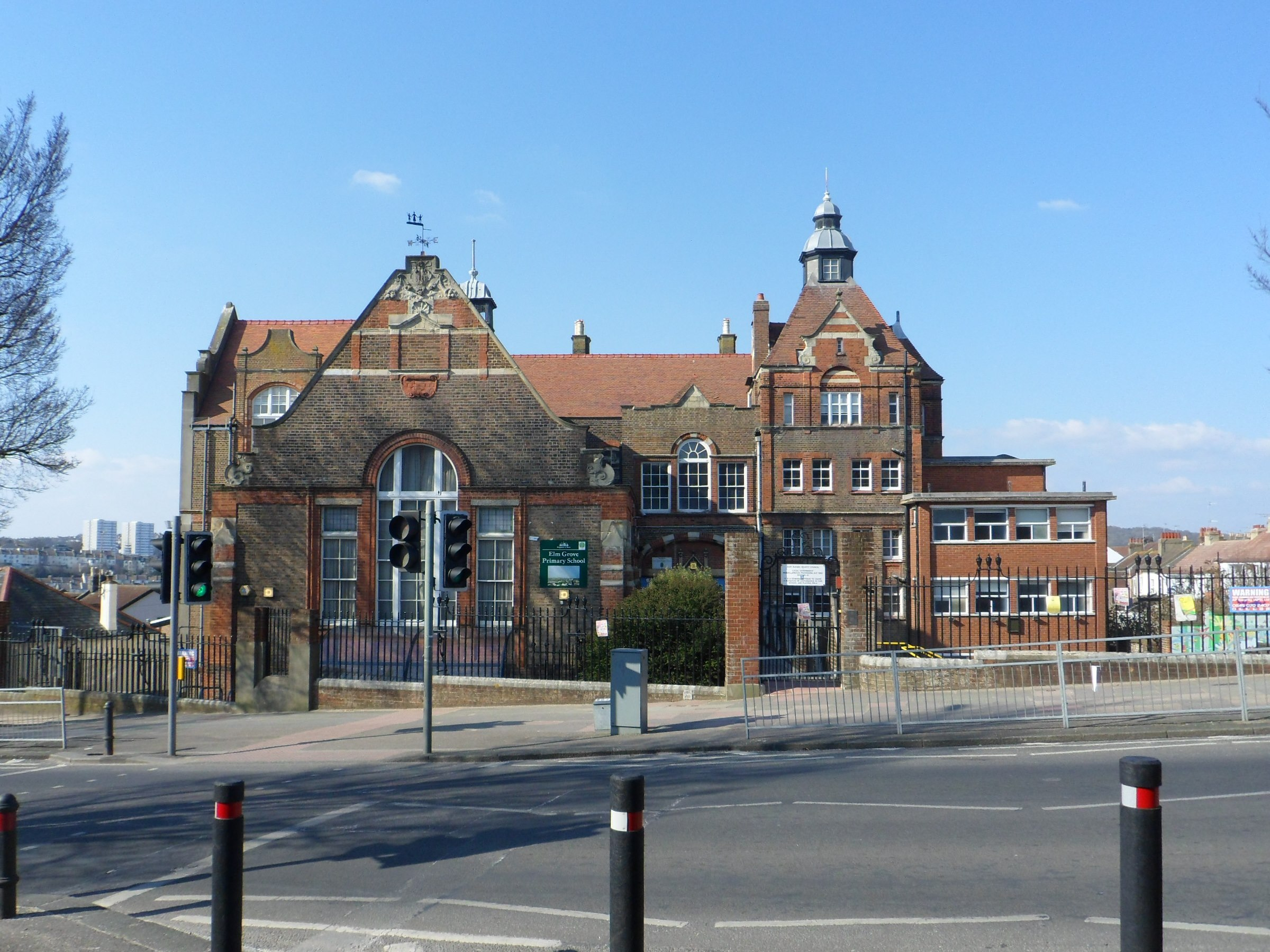
Elm Grove Board School at Elm Grove, Brighton (1893)

Thomas Simpson's main source of work for more than 30 years was the Brighton School Board (later the Brighton and Preston School Board) and its equivalent in neighbouring Hove. There was no nationally coordinated scheme of primary-level education until the Elementary Education Act 1870 was passed; this empowered local councils to form school boards with elected members and funded by rates. Brighton's population was growing rapidly at the time, and many new schools were needed. Simpson was appointed architect and surveyor to the Brighton School Board in 1871 and held the same positions with the Hove School Board from 1876. His remit in Brighton was extended from 1878 when the borough's Board merged with that of the neighbouring parish of Preston to form the Brighton and Preston School Board.

Simpson designed and built a series of "distinguished" board schools in a variety of styles between 1870 and 1903, some (from 1890) in partnership with his son Gilbert. His other son John William Simpson may have been involved in some designs as well. Several have Grade II listed status: Finsbury Road Board School (1881) in Hanover, Connaught Road School (1884) in Hove, Ditchling Road Board School (1890), Stanford Road School in Prestonville (1893) and St Luke's School in Queen's Park (1900–03). Also attributed to Simpson is the 1887 rebuild of the Central Infants School on Upper Gloucester Street in North Laine (opened as a National School in 1826 and now converted into flats). His other surviving buildings, not all still in use as schools, are at Fairlight Place near Lewes Road (1870), Freshfield Place in Queen's Park (1880), Preston Road near Preston Park (1880) and Elm Grove (1893). Several other examples of his buildings have been demolished, most recently at Circus Street in Carlton Hill (1883), demolished in 2017 as part of a major redevelopment scheme. Also designed by Simpson as part of the St Luke's School complex were a municipal swimming pool and a school caretaker's house, both of which are also Grade II-listed.

=== Religious buildings ===
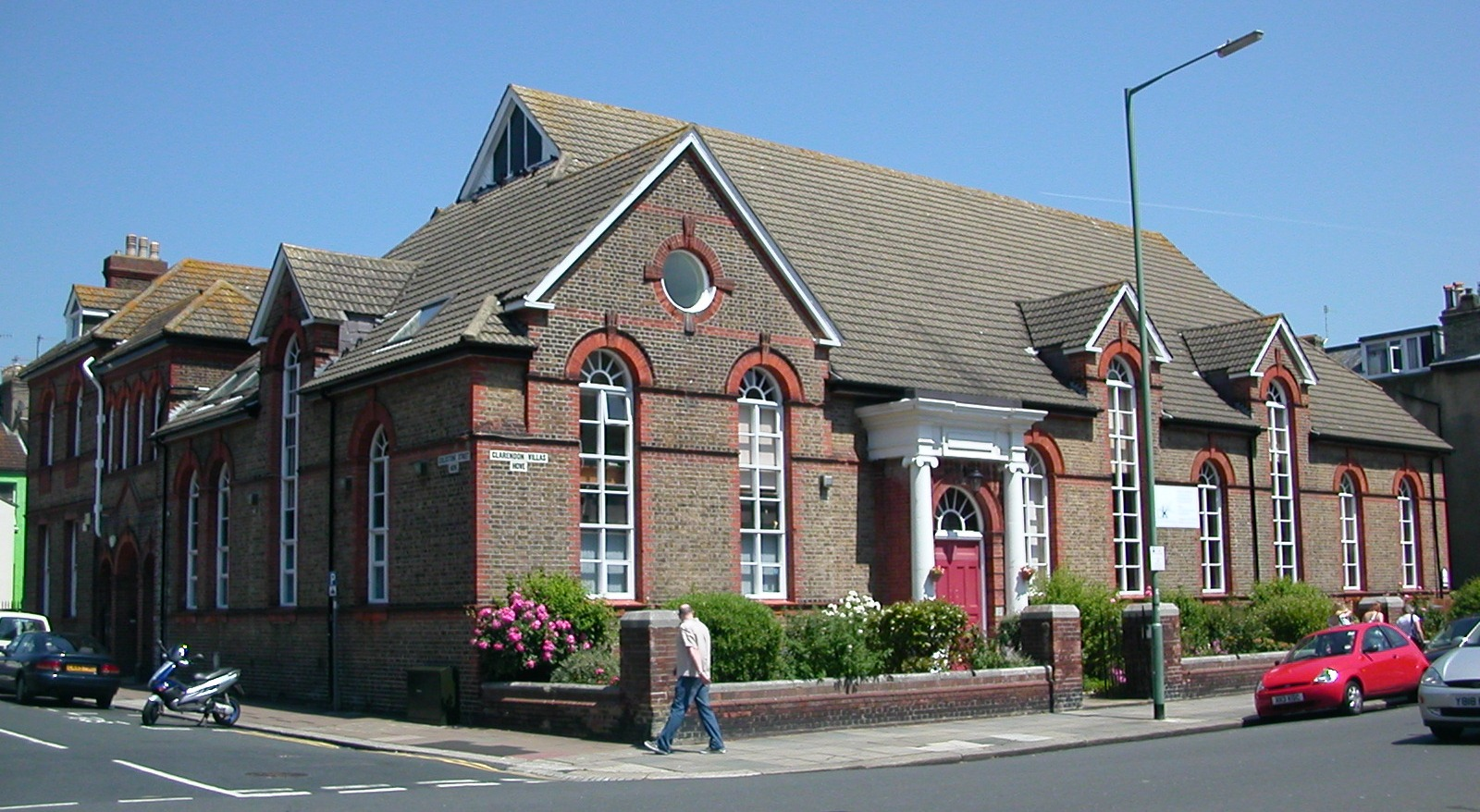
Clarendon Mission (1885)

Simpson's earliest recorded commission was his work to redesign and extend the Ann Street chapel of the Countess of Huntingdon's Connexion in 1857. Later known as London Road Congregational Church, this building survived until 1974 but was demolished during urban renewal in that inner part of Brighton. In 1861, he redesigned Salem Strict Baptist Chapel in Bond Street in the North Laine area of Brighton. This chapel for the Strict Baptist community dated from 1787. He rebuilt it in a style which combined Neoclassical and Italianate architecture and made use of stucco and flintwork. The building was also demolished in 1974, this time for commercial development. Four years later, he designed the Belgrave Street Chapel for Congregationalists. This was an Early English Gothic Revival-style building with a stuccoed façade, placed on a corner site in the Hanover district of Brighton. After its closure in 1942 it became part of Brighton Technical College.

His principal work for the Congregational church, and his largest ecclesiastical work, was the former Dials Congregational Church (demolished in 1972, but only redeveloped with sheltered housing in 1985). Its 150-foot (46 m) tower had a Rhenish helm and was an important landmark on its elevated site west of Brighton station. Inside, the church was laid out as an auditorium, with a vast u-shaped space. Simpson used the Romanesque Revival style for his design.

Simpson was also commissioned to design a mission hall in Hove in 1885. The Clarendon Mission on Clarendon Villas was founded by William Taylor, who became its first pastor, and his friend William Willett. The work cost £4,700, but the building burnt down shortly after it opened and had to be rebuilt at an additional cost of £2,500. The adjacent Sunday school was added by a different architect. In the late 20th century, the founder of the Newfrontiers church Terry Virgo was minister at the church, which by then was called Clarendon Church. The building is Renaissance Revival in style and has yellow and red brickwork with terracotta decoration.
