= Portslade Town Hall =

Municipal building in Portslade, East Sussex, England

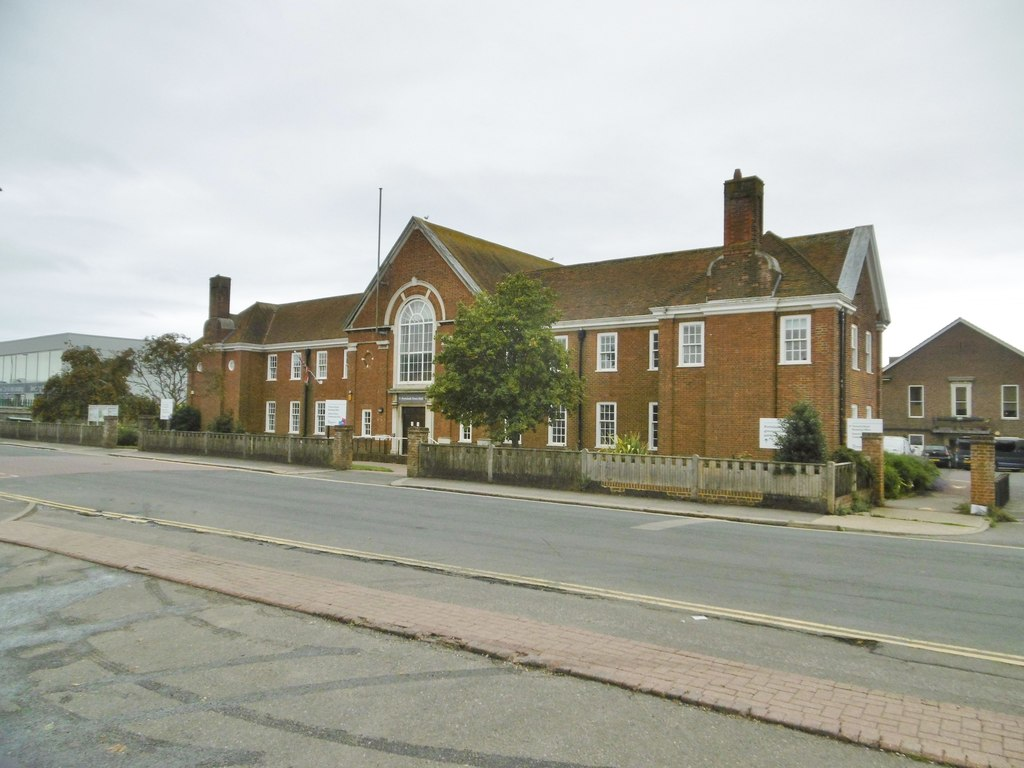
- Portslade Town Hall

- Shown in East Sussex
- 50.8364°N 0.2115°W
- Location: Victoria Road, Portslade

History
- Built: 1928

Site notes
- Architect: Gilbert Murray Simpson
- Architectural style: Neo-Georgian style

Portslade Town Hall, formerly the Ronuk Hall and Welfare Institute, is a municipal building in Victoria Road in Portslade, East Sussex, England. The structure, which was the meeting place of Portslade Urban District Council Council, is a locally-listed building.

== History ==
Following significant population growth, largely associated with the seaside tourism industry, the area became an urban district in 1898. The new council initially operated from offices in Station Road.

Meanwhile, Ronuk Limited, a polish manufacturing company founded by Horace Fowler, opened a new factory in Portslade in 1902. After high demand for the product led to expansion of the business, the directors decided to procure a social club for the workforce to be known as the Ronuk Hall and Welfare Institute. The foundation stone for the new social club was laid by Marion Elizabeth Chignell, whose father had been a director of the company, on 28 July 1927.

The social club was designed by Gilbert Murray Simpson in the Neo-Georgian style, built in red brick with stone dressings and completed in 1928. The design involved a symmetrical main frontage with thirteen bays facing onto Victoria Road, with the end bays projected forward as pavilions. The central section of three bays, which also slightly projected forward, featured a doorway flanked by Doric order pilasters supporting an entablature. There was a tall round headed window on the first floor and an open pediment above. The outer bays in the central section featured sash windows on the ground floor and blind oculi above. The sections on either side contained sash windows on both floors. Internally, the principal room was the main hall which featured balustraded galleries.

The building served as a British Restaurant during the Second World War. In the late 1950s the directors of Ronuk entered into negotiations to dispose of the company's assets and business; the social club was bought by Portslade Urban District Council, which was seeking larger offices. The Ronuk business was sold to Newton, Chambers & Co. After appropriate conversion work had been carried out, the building was re-opened by the chairman of the council, Robert Shields, as Portslade Town Hall on 2 September 1959.

The building continued to serve as the headquarters of the council through the 1960s and early 1970s but ceased to be the local seat of government when Porstlade was absorbed into Hove Borough Council in 1974. A theatre organ, which had originally been designed and manufactured by Compton & Co for the Queens Cinema in Cricklewood, was augmented with parts from two other organs and then installed in the main hall for concert use in 1987.

A programme of refurbishment works, which involved the creation of new offices for the local housing team and for the local neighbourhood policing team, as well as the development of a community hub for local people, was carried out in spring 2014. Following completion of the works, the building was re-opened by the Brighton and Hove mayor, Brian Fitch, on 11 June 2014.
