= John William Simpson =

British architect

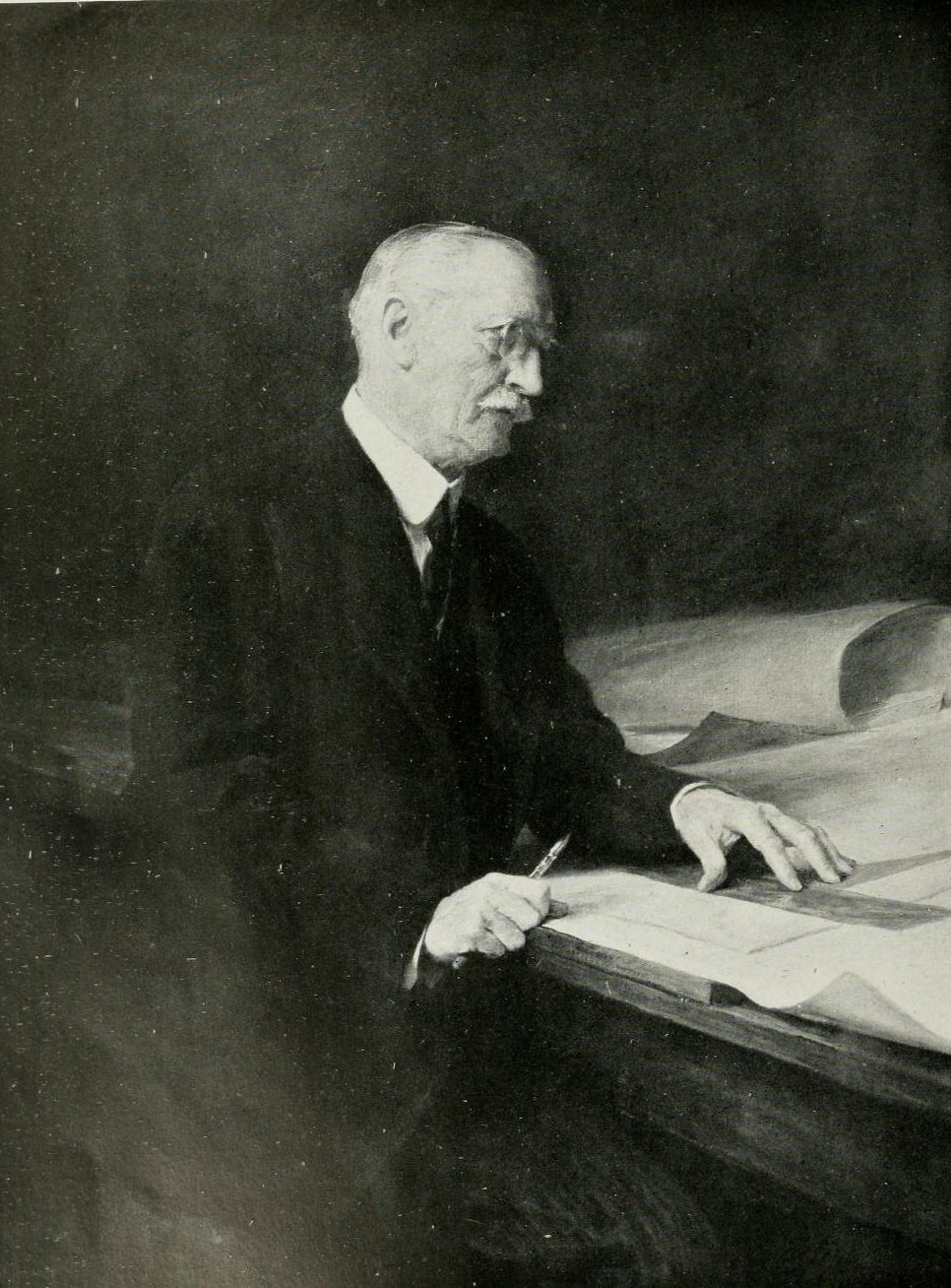
Portrait by Arthur Stockdale Cope

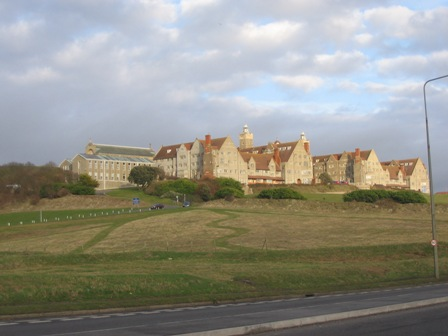
Roedean School by Simpson (1898)

Sir John William Simpson KBE FRIBA (9 August 1858 – 30 March 1933) was a British architect and President of the Royal Institute of British Architects from 1919 to 1921.

== Background and early life ==
Simpson was the eldest son of the Brighton architect Thomas Simpson and his wife Clara Hart. He was the brother of another architect, Gilbert Murray Simpson.

He was educated privately and articled to his father in 1875, but later attended the Royal Academy Schools.

== Career ==
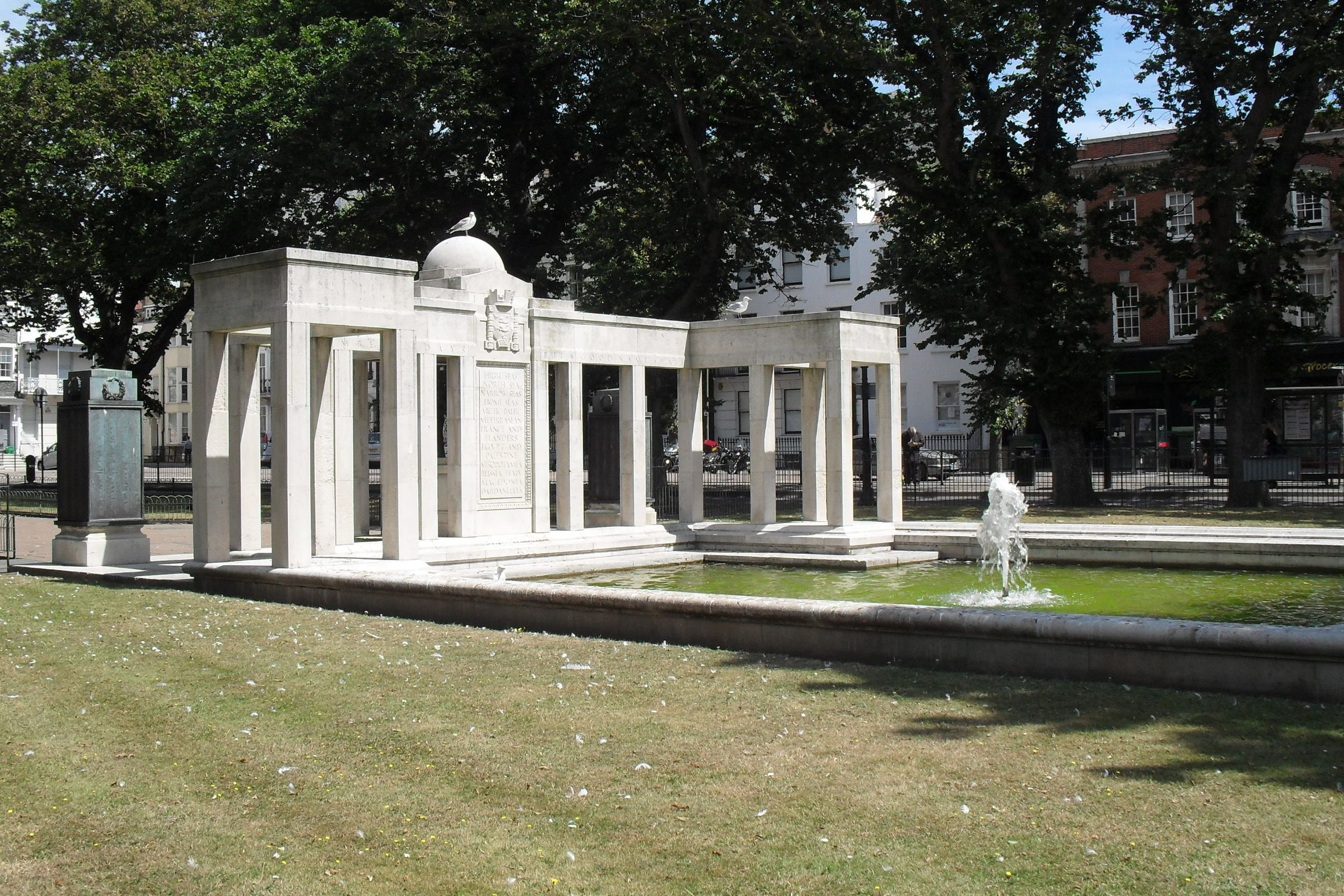
Sir John William Simpson designed the Brighton War Memorial.

Simpson became an Associate of the Royal Institute of British Architects in 1882. He was in partnership with M. P. Manning from 1881 to 1884 and subsequently with E. J. Milner Allen, specializing in public buildings.

He was an active member of the Royal Institute of British Architects, rising to be its President, and of a number of architectural associations in other countries. He also wrote books and articles on architecture.

In 1905, he was joined in his practice by the young Maxwell Ayrton, and they entered into a partnership in 1910.

He never married, and died at home in West Hill, Highgate, Middlesex, on 30 March 1933.

== Publications ==
- Introduction to Sir Lawrence Weaver's Architectural Copyright (1911)
- Essays and Memorials (1923)
- Paris Rosemary. For remembrance of bygone scenes and circumstances (1927)
- Some Account of the Old Hall of Lincoln's Inn (1928)
- The Architecture of the Renaissance in France by W. H. Ward (second edition, ed. J. W. Simpson, 1926)

Simpson wrote many professional papers on architecture and town planning. He edited the periodical The Book of Book-Plates between 1900 and 1903.

== Memberships and appointments ==
- Secretary-general of the London Town Planning Conference, 1910
- Member of Council of the British School at Rome
- Corresponding member of the Institut de France
- Member of the Sociedad Central de Arquitectos, Buenos Aires
- Member of the Centralvereinigung der Architekten, Vienna

== Honours ==
- Fellow of the Royal Institute of British Architects, 1900
- President of the Royal Institute of British Architects, 1919
- Gold medal of the Société des Artistes Français, 1922
- President of the Union Franco-Britannique des Architectes, 1922
- Knight Commander of the Order of the British Empire, 1924
- Chevalier of the Légion d'honneur

== Major works ==
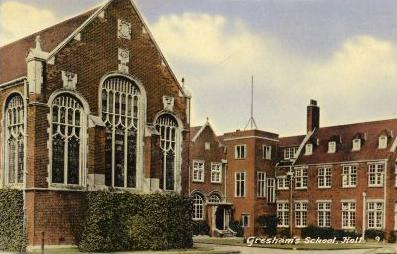
Big School at Gresham's by Simpson (1903)

- Wembley Stadium (with Maxwell Ayrton)
- Victoria Institute, Worcester (1896) (collaboration)
- Offices of the Crown Agents for the Colonies at 4 Millbank (1914–16)
- West Downs School, Winchester (1897–98)
- Roedean School (1898–99, 1906, 1908, 1911)
- New school buildings at Gresham's School (completed 1903)
- Restoration of the Old Hall of Lincoln's Inn, London
- Kelvingrove Art Gallery and Museum (with E.J. Milner Allen)
- New buildings for Lancing College
- New buildings for Haileybury College (now called Haileybury and Imperial Service College)
- Queen Victoria memorial at Bradford
- Royal Sussex Regiment memorial at Regency Square, Brighton
- Onslow Ford memorial in St John's Wood
- Cartwright Memorial Hall at Bradford
- Brighton War Memorial, Old Steine, Brighton
- Palace of Industry, Palace of Engineering and Stadium at British Empire Exhibition, Wembley, 1924 (with Maxwell Ayrton)
- Grafton Street Hospital, Liverpool (collaboration)
- National Hospital for the Paralysed and Epileptic, Queen Square, London (collaboration)
- Glasgow Art Galleries for the Corporation of Glasgow (collaboration)
