= Gilbert Murray Simpson =

British architect (1869–1954)

- Born: 1869; Brighton, East Sussex
- Died: 1954 (aged 84–85)
- Occupation: Architect
- Practice: Thomas Simpson & Son (from 1890)
- Buildings: Varndean School, Brighton
- Projects: Schools for Brighton and Preston School Board (from 1890)

Gilbert Murray Simpson friba (1869–1954) was a British architect from Brighton who did most of his work in the seaside resort. In 1890 Simpson joined his father Thomas, architect to the Brighton and Preston School Board and the Hove School Board, and helped to design some of the "distinguished group of board schools" for those institutions during the late 19th century. He took over the firm of Thomas Simpson & Son when his father died in 1908, and went on to design several other institutional buildings in Brighton. His elder brother Sir John William Simpson was also an architect.

== Biography ==
Simpson was born in Brighton in 1869 to the Scottish architect Thomas (1825–1908) and Clara Simpson (née Hart). He was 11 years younger than his "better-known" brother John. After his education at Bishop's Stortford College, he started his career in architecture in 1886 as an articled clerk to his father at his office at 16 Ship Street, Brighton. He progressed to the position of assistant, and became a partner in 1890 when the firm took the name Thomas Simpson & Son. From 1908, William Jackson Pywell (1884/5–1917) was articled to the firm. Simpson qualified as an Associate of the Royal Institute of British Architects (ariba) in 1893; his proposers were Thomas Lainson, Lacy Ridge and A. Cates.

Working alongside his father at first, he spent 47 years as architect and surveyor to the Brighton and Preston School Board and its successor the Brighton Education Committee, which was formed on 1 April 1903 as a result of the Education Act 1902 (which abolished school boards and brought all education provision under borough council control).

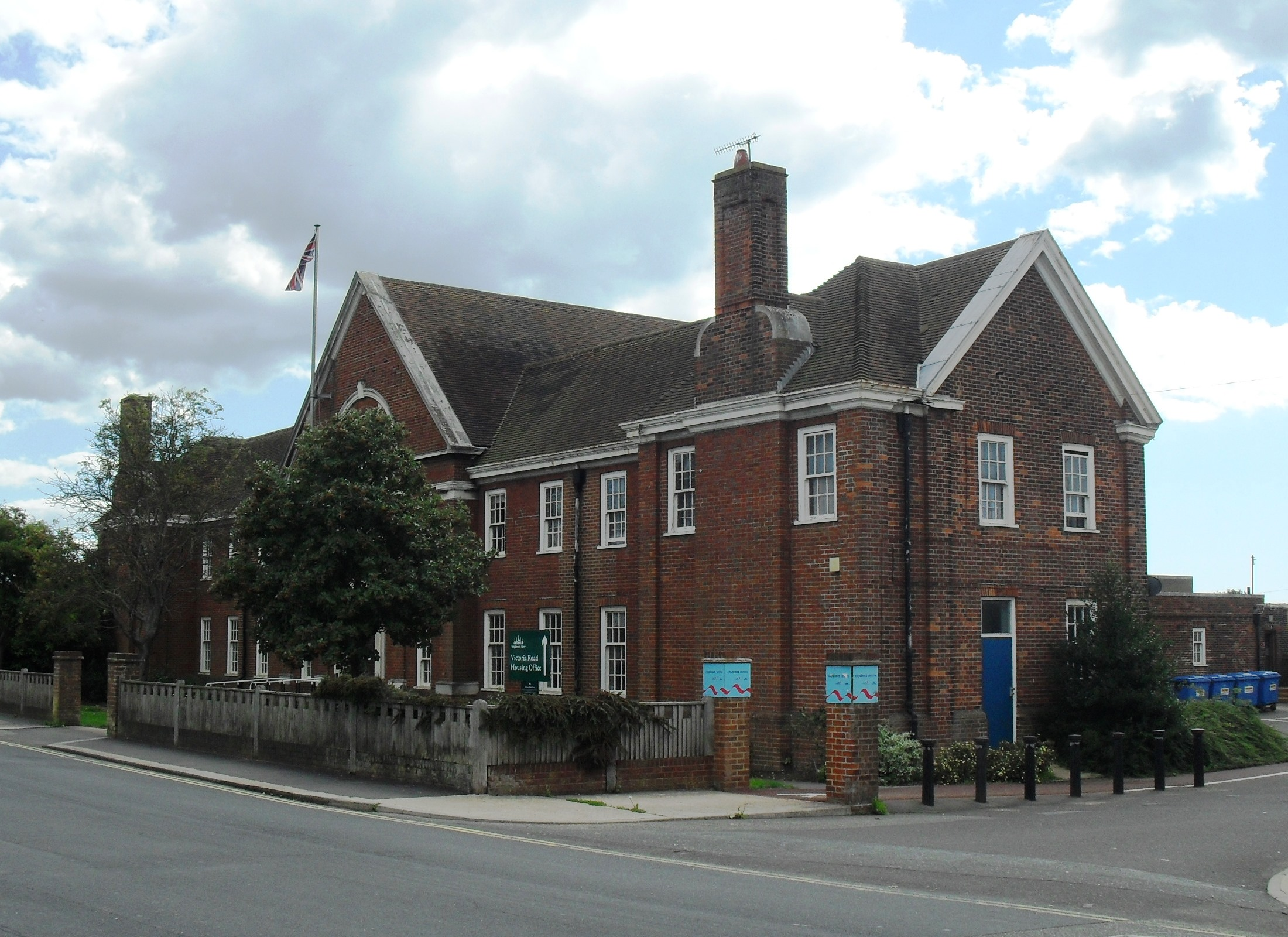
Portslade Town Hall (1928)

In 1924, Simpson was commissioned to design a new school building for a girls' school which occupied "overcrowded" buildings in York Place, Brighton. Varndean School for Girls, named after a nearby farm and situated in the Withdean area, opened in 1926. Soon afterwards he designed a boys' school on the same site. Varndean School for Boys was designed in the Neo-Georgian style around two quadrangles; Simpson started work in 1929, and the school opened in 1931. The schools have since merged and are known as Varndean School. Between these two commissions, he designed a building in nearby Portslade which later became the town hall. The Ronuk Hall and Welfare Institute on Victoria Road (1928) served two purposes: it was a social club and multi-purpose hall for workers at the nearby Ronuk wax polish factory, and it was a memorial to Robert Chignall, a director of the company. Simpson designed the brown-brick building in the Neo-Georgian style and gave it an "attractive" main hall with balustraded galleries. It became Portslade Town Hall in 1959. In 1931, he designed the Hertford Road School (now Hertford Infants School) in the Hollingdean suburb of Brighton. Upon its opening in April of that year it was described in local newspapers as "the last word in modern design". The school was needed because of overcrowding at the Ditchling Road Board School, on which Simpson had worked earlier in his career.

Simpson acted as executor to his brother when he died in March 1933. His own death came in 1954, nine years after retiring and a year after resigning from the RIBA.
