= Hanover, Brighton =

Area of Brighton, England

Coordinates: 50°49′45″N 0°07′41″W

Washington Street in Hanover. The houses are typical for the area.

Hanover Day 2007.

Hanover is an area within the city of Brighton and Hove in East Sussex, England. It is part of the electoral ward of Hanover & Elm Grove. The population of this ward at the 2011 census was 16,006.

The exact boundaries of the neighbourhood of Hanover are generally thought of as the area running up the hill to the east of the Level, towards Queen's Park Road, bounded on the north by Elm Grove and on the south by Sussex Street. The local government ward of Hanover & Elm Grove includes some of the streets to the north of Elm Grove, and the streets north of Down Terrace. Many streets in Hanover are characterised by brightly coloured houses.

Physically, Hanover is principally a very steep hill, lined with streets of tightly packed Victorian cottages. Its population includes many commuters (Brighton railway station is 15 minutes' walk away), academics, public servants and numerous students – due in part to the University of Brighton Halls of Residence by the site of the former Phoenix Brewery.

The Hanover Community Association represents the local community and runs a very active community centre on Southover Street and a Beer festival in September/October. The successful "Hanover Day" is now run by a separate "Hanover Day Association". Until 2006 Hanover Day took place each August but the 2007 day was on 8 July and there was no celebration in 2008 due to various problems.

The 2009 Hanover Day took place on 5 July 2009, in the area around Lincoln Street and Washington Street. The theme was "The Hanging Gardens of Hanover".

Hanover is home to an unusually large cat population and was featured in the BBC programme Cat Watch 2014: The 21st Century house cat, a three-part series that looked at how cats are adapting to a domestic life by the side of people. This led rise to the active community group Cats of Hanover.

Hanover has a number of schools located within its boundaries such as Elm Grove School and the now closed Finsbury Road Board School, which has been converted into the ‘Hanover Lofts.’
