= Brighton Blitz =

Bombing of Brighton in the Second World War

The Brighton Blitz was the bombing of Brighton by the Nazi German Luftwaffe during the Second World War. Brighton was attacked from the air on 56 recorded occasions between July 1940 and February 1944. Casualties in the area were 198 killed and 357 seriously injured, with 433 receiving minor injures.

To prepare the coastline against possible sea-borne invasion by German troops, the beaches were closed at 5.00 pm on 2 July 1940 and were mined and guarded with barbed wire. Both the Palace Pier and West Pier had sections of their decking removed to prevent their use as landing stages. The town was declared to be no longer a "safe area", and 30,000 people were evacuated.

== Bombing raids ==
=== 1940 ===
On the evening of 14 September 1940 a lone Dornier Do 17 bomber, which had become separated from its main group, dropped twenty 50 kg bombs across Edward Street and the Upper Rock Gardens area. Two bombs hit the Odeon cinema in Kemp Town killing four children and two adults along with a further 48 people killed in the surrounding area. This would prove to be the worst raid on Brighton for casualties inflicted during the war.

=== 1943 ===
At 12:25 p.m. on 25 May 1943 the town was attacked by 25 to 30 German Focke-Wulf Fw 190 aircraft. Twenty-two bombs of 500 kg were dropped and the streets were machine-gunned during the five-minute raid. Fatalities included ten men, twelve women and two children. An additional 58 people were seriously injured and a further 69 people were slightly injured. One of the central piers in the 20-metre-high (66 ft) London Road railway viaduct was demolished. There was severe damage to railway workshops and rolling stock. This was the worst raid for damage inflicted on the town during the war with 150 houses made uninhabitable, more than 500 people made homeless, and the Black Rock Gasworks being set on fire.

=== 1944 ===
In 1944 Brighton was hit by V-1 flying bombs. On 10 July two Sappers were killed whilst clearing mines on the beach - They were Sapper John Owen Morris from Llanddeiniolen and L/Cpl James Green Evans from Llanfairfechan, Bangor, both in Caernarvonshire, North Wales.
