= List of schools in Brighton and Hove =

This is a list of schools in Brighton and Hove, in the English county of East Sussex.

== State-funded schools ==
=== Primary schools ===
- Aldrington CE Primary School, Hove
- Balfour Primary School, Brighton
- Benfield Primary School, Portslade
- Bevendean Primary School, Bevendean
- Bilingual Primary School, Hove
- Brackenbury Primary School, Portslade
- Brunswick Primary School, Hove
- Carden Primary School, Brighton
- Carlton Hill Primary School, Brighton
- City Academy Whitehawk, Whitehawk
- Coldean Primary School, Coldean
- Coombe Road Primary School, Brighton
- Cottesmore St Mary's RC Primary School, Hove
- Downs Infant School, Brighton
- Downs Junior School, Brighton
- Elm Grove Primary School, Brighton
- Fairlight Primary School, Brighton
- Goldstone Primary School, Hove
- Hangleton Primary School, Hove
- Hertford Primary School, Brighton
- Hove Junior School, Hove
- Middle Street Primary School, Brighton
- Mile Oak Primary School, Portslade
- Moulsecoomb Primary School, Moulsecoomb
- Our Lady of Lourdes RC Primary School Rottingdean
- Patcham Infant School, Patcham
- Patcham Junior School, Patcham
- Peter Gladwin Primary School, Portslade
- Queen's Park Primary School, Brighton
- Rudyard Kipling Primary School & Nursery, Woodingdean
- St Andrew's CE Primary School, Hove
- St Bernadette's RC Primary School, Withdean
- St John The Baptist RC Primary School, Brighton
- St Joseph's RC Primary School, Hollingdean
- St Luke's Primary School, Brighton
- St Margaret's CE Primary School, Rottingdean
- St Mark's CE Primary School, Brighton
- St Martin's CE Primary School, Brighton
- St Mary Magdalen's RC Primary School Brighton
- St Mary's RC Primary School, Portslade
- St Nicholas' CE Primary School, Portslade
- St Paul's CE Primary School, Brighton
- St Peter's Community Primary School, Portslade
- Saltdean Primary School, Saltdean
- Stanford Infant School, Brighton
- Stanford Junior School, Brighton
- West Blatchington Primary and Nursery School, West Blatchington
- West Hove Infant School, Hove
- Westdene Primary School, Brighton
- Woodingdean Primary School, Woodingdean

=== Secondary schools ===
- Blatchington Mill School and Sixth Form College, West Blatchington
- Brighton Aldridge Community Academy, Brighton
- Cardinal Newman Catholic School, Hove
- Dorothy Stringer School, Brighton
- Hove Park School, Hove
- King's School, Hove
- Longhill High School, Rottingdean
- Patcham High School, Patcham
- Portslade Aldridge Community Academy, Portslade
- Varndean School, Brighton

=== Special and alternative schools ===
- Central Hub Brighton, Brighton
- Downs View Special School, Woodingdean
- Hill Park School, Portslade
- Homewood College, Brighton

=== Further education ===
- Brighton Hove & Sussex Sixth Form College (BHASVIC), Hove
- Varndean College, Brighton
- City College Brighton & Hove, Brighton

== Independent schools ==
=== Primary and preparatory schools ===
- Brighton and Hove Montessori School, Brighton
- Brighton College Nursery and Pre-Prep School, Brighton
- Brighton College Preparatory School, Brighton
- Lancing College Preparatory School, Hove
- The Montessori Place, Hove
- St Christopher's School, Hove
- Windlesham School, Brighton

=== Senior and all-through schools ===
- Bartholomews Tutorial College, Brighton
- Brighton College, Brighton
- Brighton Girls, Brighton, Brighton
- Brighton International School, Brighton
- Brighton Waldorf School, Brighton
- The Drive Prep School, Hove
- Kings Brighton, Brighton
- Oxford International College, Brighton
- Roedean School, Roedean

=== Special and alternative schools ===
- Brighton and Hove Clinic School, Hove
- Hamilton Lodge School for Deaf Children, Brighton
- The Lioncare School, Hove

=== Further education ===
- Hove College, Hove

== See also ==
- List of former board schools in Brighton and Hove
