= Grade II listed buildings in Brighton and Hove: W–Z =

As of February 2001, there were 1,124 listed buildings with Grade II status in the English city of Brighton and Hove. The total at 2009 was similar. The city, on the English Channel coast approximately 52 miles (84 km) south of London, was formed as a unitary authority in 1997 by the merger of the neighbouring towns of Brighton and Hove. Queen Elizabeth II granted city status in 2000.

In England, a building or structure is defined as "listed" when it is placed on a statutory register of buildings of "special architectural or historic interest" by the Secretary of State for Culture, Media and Sport, a Government department, in accordance with the Planning (Listed Buildings and Conservation Areas) Act 1990. English Heritage, a non-departmental public body, acts as an agency of this department to administer the process and advise the department on relevant issues. There are three grades of listing status. The Grade II designation is the lowest, and is used for "nationally important buildings of special interest". Grade II* is used for "particularly important buildings of more than special interest"; there are 69 such buildings in the city. There are also 24 Grade I listed buildings (defined as being of "exceptional interest" and greater than national importance, and the highest of the three grades) in Brighton and Hove.

This list summarises 75 Grade II-listed buildings and structures whose names begin with W. Numbered buildings with no individual name are listed by the name of the street they stand on. Some listings include contributory fixtures such as surrounding walls or railings in front of the building. These are summarised by notes alongside the building name.

== Listed buildings ==
Contributory fixtures
Note	Listing includes
^{[A]}	Attached railings
^{[B]}	Attached walls and piers
^{[C]}	Attached walls and railings
^{[D]}	Attached walls, railings and lavatories

Building name	Area	Image	Notes	Refs
Wall and gate piers at Hanover Crescent	Hanover; 50.8310°N 0.1312°W		.	
Wall and gate piers at Vicarage of All Saints Church	Hove; 50.8302°N 0.1667°W		.	
Wall and railings at Dorset Gardens	Kemptown; 50.8221°N 0.1335°W		.	
Wall at 1 King's Gardens	Hove; 50.8247°N 0.1701°W		.	
Wall at 7–19 Church Road	Hove; 50.8268°N 0.1628°W		.	
Wall at 21–33 Church Road	Hove; 50.8269°N 0.1638°W		.	
Wall at 87 St George's Road	Kemptown; 50.8184°N 0.1210°W		.	
Wall at Barford Court	Hove; 50.8260°N 0.1830°W		.	
Wall at Brighton and Hove High School for Girls	Montpelier; 50.8279°N 0.1511°W		.	
Wall at Clifton Gardens	Montpelier; 50.8264°N 0.1480°W		.	
Wall at Down House	Rottingdean; 50.8075°N 0.0592°W		.	
Wall at Hillside	Rottingdean; 50.8069°N 0.0608°W		.	
Wall at Percy and Wagner Almshouses	Elm Grove; 50.8318°N 0.1298°W		.	
Wall at south side of Adelaide Crescent gardens	Hove; 50.8241°N 0.1646°W		.	
Wall at Southdown House	Patcham; 50.8639°N 0.1514°W		.	
Wall at St Aubyn's School	Rottingdean; 50.8041°N 0.0577°W		.	
Wall at St Nicolas' Churchyard	Portslade; 50.8430°N 0.2187°W		.	
Wall at stables of Stanmer House	Stanmer; 50.8693°N 0.1034°W		.	
Wall at The Timbers	Rottingdean; 50.8068°N 0.0594°W		.	
Walls and buildings at Kipling Gardens	Rottingdean; 50.8074°N 0.0589°W		.	
Walls and gate piers at Ocean Hotel	Saltdean; 50.8024°N 0.0355°W		.	
Walls and lychgate at St Margaret's Church	Rottingdean; 50.8065°N 0.0572°W		.	
Walls and piers at Norfolk Hotel	Brighton; 50.8226°N 0.1555°W		.	
Walls and railings at St Luke's School and Swimming Baths	Queen's Park; 50.8271°N 0.1208°W		.	
Walls at Brighton Forum	Round Hill; 50.8330°N 0.1342°W		.	
Walls at Church of the Good Shepherd	Prestonville; 50.8415°N 0.1582°W		.	
Walls at former Attree Villa	Queen's Park; 50.8274°N 0.1243°W		.	
Walls at Home Farmhouse	Stanmer; 50.8708°N 0.1026°W		.	
Walls at Ian Fraser House	Ovingdean; 50.8084°N 0.0706°W		.	
Walls at Manor Lodge	Portslade; 50.8420°N 0.2175°W		.	
Walls at Patcham Court Farmhouse	Patcham; 50.8671°N 0.1512°W		.	
Walls at Preston Manor	Preston Village; 50.8422°N 0.1504°W		.	
Walls at St Mary's Convent	Portslade; 50.8431°N 0.2178°W		.	
Walls at St Mary's Hall School	Kemptown; 50.8187°N 0.1155°W		.	
Walls between All Saints Churchyard and Village Barn	Patcham; 50.8666°N 0.1511°W		.	
Walls, gates, piers and railings at Brighton and Preston Cemetery	Bear Road; 50.8342°N 0.1201°W		.	
Water catcher at Stanmer Park	Stanmer; 50.8722°N 0.1066°W		.	
Waterhall Mill (More images)	Westdene; 50.8628°N 0.1664°W		This windmill was erected in 1885—the last windmill built in Sussex. It was operational until 1924, and was converted into a house in 1963; during World War II, it had been used as a lookout post. The three-storey circular structure is brick-built with a cement coating, and the upper stage is partly tiled.	
1 Waterloo Place	Brighton; 50.8286°N 0.1342°W		.	
2 Waterloo Place	Brighton; 50.8286°N 0.1341°W		.	
4–6 Waterloo Street^{[A]}	Brunswick Town; 50.8237°N 0.1573°W		.	
7–15 Waterloo Street^{[A]}	Brunswick Town; 50.8238°N 0.1572°W		.	
16–21 Waterloo Street^{[A]}	Brunswick Town; 50.8244°N 0.1570°W		.	
22–28 Waterloo Street^{[A]}	Brunswick Town; 50.8248°N 0.1569°W		.	
29–33 Waterloo Street^{[A]}	Brunswick Town; 50.8250°N 0.1568°W		.	
45–47 Waterloo Street^{[A]}	Brunswick Town; 50.8246°N 0.1566°W		.	
48–64 Waterloo Street^{[A]}	Brunswick Town; 50.8237°N 0.1569°W		.	
Waterloo Street Arch	Brunswick Town; 50.8234°N 0.1570°W		.	
Wavertree House (More images)	Brunswick Town; 50.8277°N 0.1582°W		.	
Wellhouse at Preston Manor	Preston Village; 50.8427°N 0.1493°W		.	
Wellhouse at Stanmer Church	Stanmer; 50.8705°N 0.1019°W		.	
Wellhouse between Stanmer House and stables	Stanmer; 50.8693°N 0.1027°W		.	
Wellington Court^{[A]}	Brunswick Town; 50.8234°N 0.1574°W		.	
77 West Street^{[A]} (More images)	Brighton; 50.8213°N 0.1442°W		.	
Western Bandstand^{[D]} (More images)	Brighton; 50.8221°N 0.1549°W		.	
20 Western Road	Hove; 50.8253°N 0.1573°W		.	
68–72 Western Road	Hove; 50.8263°N 0.1628°W		.	
73–76 Western Road	Hove; 50.8265°N 0.1641°W		.	
82 Western Road (More images)	Hove; 50.8264°N 0.1615°W		.	
86 and 87 Western Road	Hove; 50.8262°N 0.1609°W		.	
103 Western Road	Hove; 50.8249°N 0.1534°W		.	
105 Western Road	Hove; 50.8248°N 0.1536°W		.	
108 Western Road	Hove; 50.8249°N 0.1540°W		.	
5 Western Street	Brighton; 50.8234°N 0.1561°W		.	
31 Western Street	Brighton; 50.8233°N 0.1558°W		.	
4–7a Western Terrace	Brighton; 50.8243°N 0.1526°W		.	
8a Western Terrace	Brighton; 50.8241°N 0.1522°W		.	
Whipping Post House	Rottingdean; 50.8058°N 0.0581°W		.	
White Knights^{[B]}	Hove; 50.8253°N 0.1729°W		.	
44 Wilbury Road	Hove; 50.8306°N 0.1654°W		.	
Wick Inn (More images)	Hove; 50.8261°N 0.1617°W		.	
Woodvale Cemetery Chapels and Crematorium (More images)	Bear Road; 50.8348°N 0.1147°W		.	
Wootton House	Patcham; 50.8635°N 0.1505°W		.	
1–12 Wykeham Terrace^{[C]} (More images)	West Hill; 50.8245°N 0.1446°W		.	
7–19 Wyndham Street	Kemptown; 50.8193°N 0.1284°W		.	

== See also ==
- Buildings and architecture of Brighton and Hove
- Grade I listed buildings in Brighton and Hove
- Grade II* listed buildings in Brighton and Hove
- List of conservation areas in Brighton and Hove
