= Patcham Place =

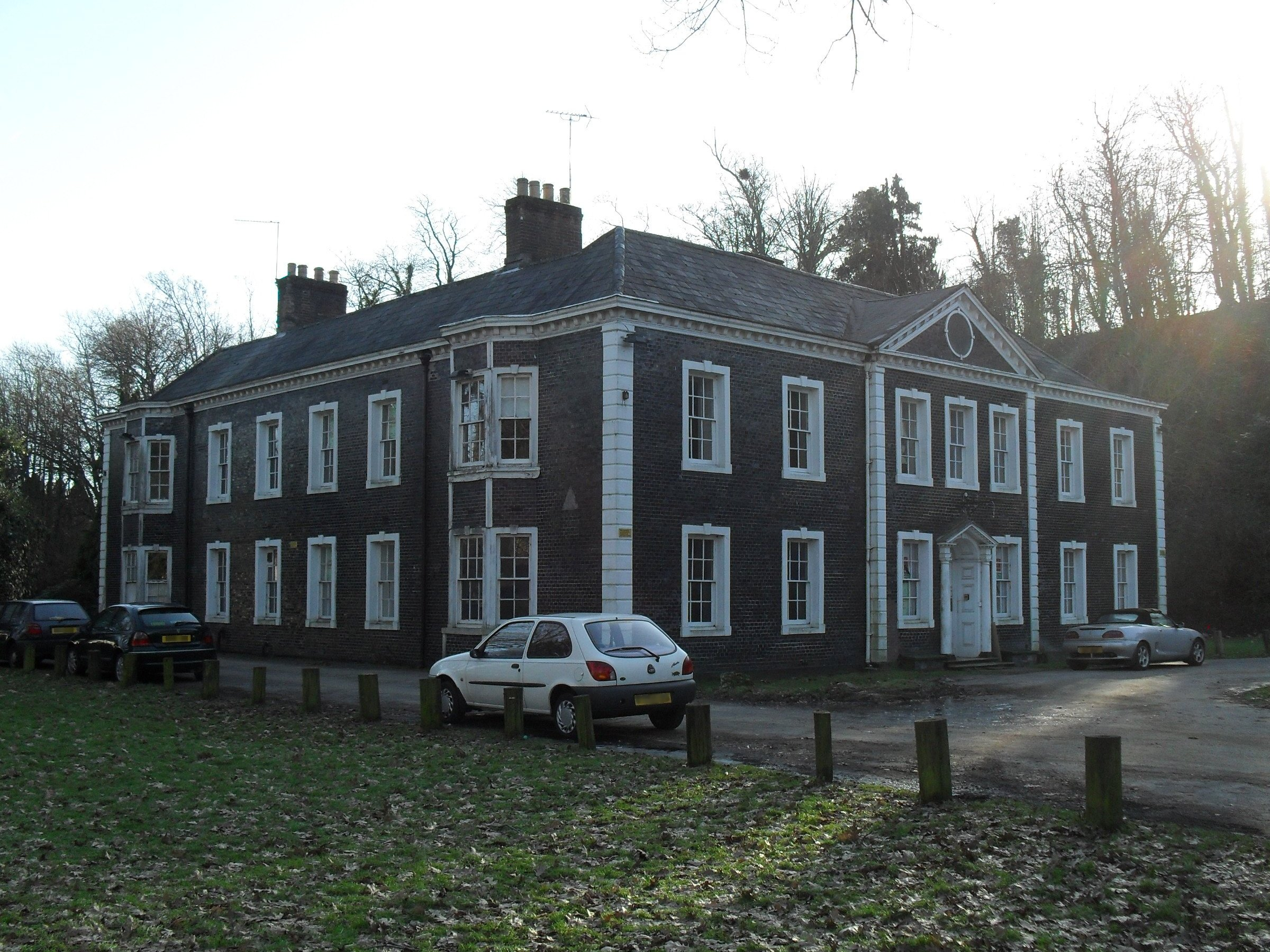
- Patcham Place from the northeast

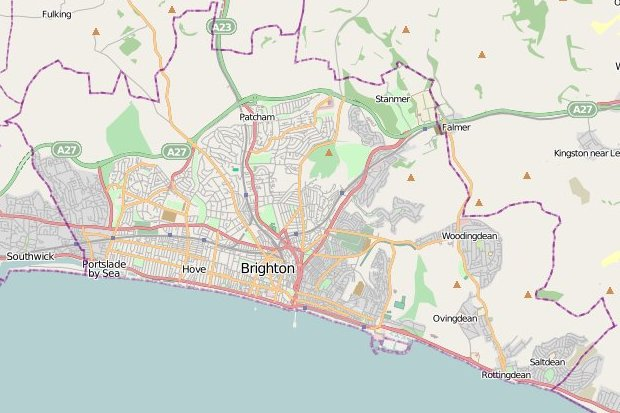
- Location of Patcham Place within Brighton and Hove
- 50.8649°N 0.1532°W
- Location: London Road, Patcham, Brighton and Hove BN1 8YD, England

History
- Built: 1558
- Built for: William West, 1st Baron De La Warr
- Rebuilt: 1764

Site notes
- Architectural style: Classical
- Restored by: John Payne

Listed Building – Grade II*
- Official name: Patcham Place
- Designated: 13 October 1952
- Reference no.: 1381686

Patcham Place is a mansion in the ancient village of Patcham, now part of the English city of Brighton and Hove. Built in 1558 as part of the Patcham Place estate, it was owned for many years by Anthony Stapley, one of the signatories of King Charles I's death warrant. It was extended and almost completely rebuilt in 1764, with traces of the older buildings remaining behind the Classical façade with its expanses of black glazed mathematical tiles—a feature typical of Brighton buildings of the era. Contemporary uses have included a youth hostel, but the house is currently used as a commercial premises. English Heritage has listed it at Grade II* for its architectural and historical importance.

== History ==
The parish of Patcham, covering 4,325 acres (1,750 ha) of chalk downland north of Brighton, has Saxon origins, and the remains of farmsteads and intermittent settlements can still be discerned. The territory includes several north–south valleys with intermittent streams (winterbournes). The Wellesbourne, "Brighton's lost river", rises near the centre of the village and flows through the present city centre to the English Channel. It was culverted and built over in the late 18th century as Brighton began to develop as a fashionable resort.

At the time of the Domesday survey in 1086, William de Warenne, 1st Earl of Surrey—who owned large areas of land in present-day Sussex—held the manor of Patcham. The predecessor of the present All Saints Church existed, and there was a small village around it. These lay east of the old road to London. In the Middle Ages, another estate developed within the parish. A house, Patcham Place, was built in an isolated position west of the road in 1558 for its first owner, William West, 1st Baron De La Warr; but the estate soon passed to Richard Shelley, son of Sir John Shelley of Michelgrove and a member of the family which later became the first Shelley Baronetcy. Richard Shelley is believed to have lived in Patcham from 1546; he was an important figure in Brighton's early history, because in 1579 he and three other local noblemen were appointed by the Privy Council to form a commission to record and regulate the "ancient customs" of the villagers and to mediate between the fishermen and the farmers, who often had conflicting needs. The commissioners produced a book, The Book of All The Auncient [Ancient] Customs heretofore used amonge the fishermen of the Toune of Brighthelmston, whose orders were enshrined in law.

Later in the 16th century, the estate passed to Richard Shelley's sons, one of whom sold it to Anthony Stapley in about 1620. The sale included Patcham Place, and Stapley made it his home for the next 35 years. During this time, he was the Governor of Chichester (the county town of West Sussex) for three years, became one of the 59 signatories of King Charles I's death warrant at his trial in 1649, and subsequently became a member of the English Council of State.

Patcham Place stayed in the Stapley family until 1700, after which it passed through several owners (including George Nevill, 1st Earl of Abergavenny). During this time it was also used as the venue for local law enforcement, where the parish constable could take people suspected of crimes to be charged in the presence of a Justice of the Peace. Stanmer House in nearby Stanmer was also used for this purpose. In 1764, Major John Payne (or Paine) bought the house, and immediately set about extending and rebuilding it, eliminating all traces of the 16th-century structure. (The house has sometimes been incorrectly described as newly built in 1764, such was the extent of the revamp.) Payne and his descendants lived in the house for many years, but in 1926, as suburban residential development began to reach the old village of Patcham, Brighton Corporation (predecessor of the present Brighton and Hove City Council) bought the house and its grounds for £6,000 (£317,000 in 2025). Two years later, Patcham was one of several parishes to be absorbed into the Borough of Brighton. In 1937 or 1939, the Corporation leased Patcham Place to the Youth Hostels Association; it was used as the Brighton area's youth hostel from then until 2007, when the lease ran out. Brighton and Hove City Council owned it thereafter. In January 2012, the council announced they were selling the lease to a company which would turn the building into a business and community centre. It was subsequently sold off to Brighton-born businessmen Mark Ratcliffe, Chris Gargan and Peter McDonnell for £1.3 million on 22 February 2013. Following restoration, the property is now used as commercial premises and is the head office of KSD Support Services Ltd, a building services and facilities management company.

Patcham Place was listed at Grade II* on 13 October 1952. Such buildings are defined as being "particularly important ... [and] of more than special interest". In February 2001, it was one of 70 Grade II*-listed buildings and structures, and 1,218 listed buildings of all grades, in the city of Brighton and Hove.

== Architecture ==
Patcham Place's present appearance is entirely 18th-century. Its style is Classical, suggested by features such as its three-bay pediment and Tuscan-columned entrance porch. The northwest and northeast walls are hung with the glazed black mathematical tiles which were a signature feature of residential buildings in Brighton between about 1760 and 1820. Elsewhere, stucco is used, except for some flint and brickwork at the rear. The roof is laid with slates and tiles.

The entrance is on the northwest face, which has seven bays. The centre three are set forward slightly and are topped by a pediment with an inset oculus and a cornice with dentil elements. The panelled wood door is 18th-century, and sits below an arched fanlight. The windows on this face are sashes topped with stuccoed architraves. On the other walls, the windows are irregularly spaced; some original sashes survive, and there are also two canted bay windows.

The interior has several large fireplaces and an ornate chimney-breast decorated with carved egg-and-dart motifs and flanked by pilasters. A plastered archway leads from the hall to the staircase, which has an elaborate stair-rail. Many of the internal doors and windows are topped with architraves.

== See also ==
- Grade II* listed buildings in Brighton and Hove
- Media related to Patcham Place at Wikimedia Commons

== Bibliography ==
- Antram, Nicholas; Morrice, Richard (2008). Brighton and Hove. Pevsner Architectural Guides. London: Yale University Press. ISBN 978-0-300-12661-7.
- Berry, Sue (2005). Georgian Brighton. Chichester: Phillimore & Co. ISBN 1-86077-342-7.
- Brighton Polytechnic. School of Architecture and Interior Design (1987). A Guide to the Buildings of Brighton. Macclesfield: McMillan Martin. ISBN 1-869865-03-0.
- Carder, Timothy (1990). The Encyclopaedia of Brighton. Lewes: East Sussex County Libraries. ISBN 0-86147-315-9.
- Dale, Antony (1989). Brighton Churches. London: Routledge. ISBN 0-415-00863-8.
- Nairn, Ian; Pevsner, Nikolaus (1965). The Buildings of England: Sussex. Harmondsworth: Penguin Books. ISBN 0-14-071028-0.
