= Wellesbourne, Brighton =

Lost river in Brighton, England

Coordinates: 50°49′11″N 0°8′12″W

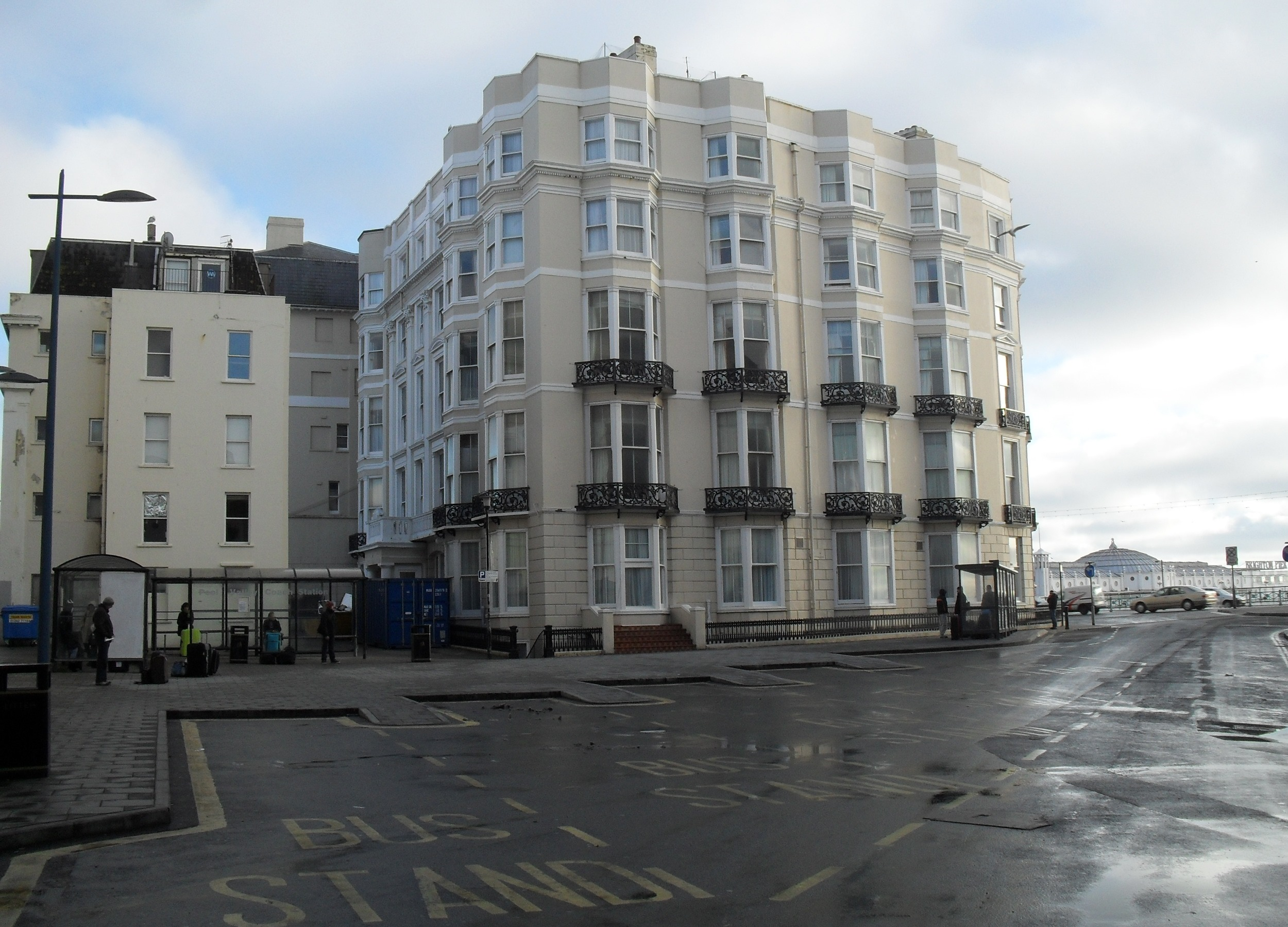
The Wellesbourne flowed into the English Channel at Pool Valley (pictured in 2010). It was culverted at this point in 1793.

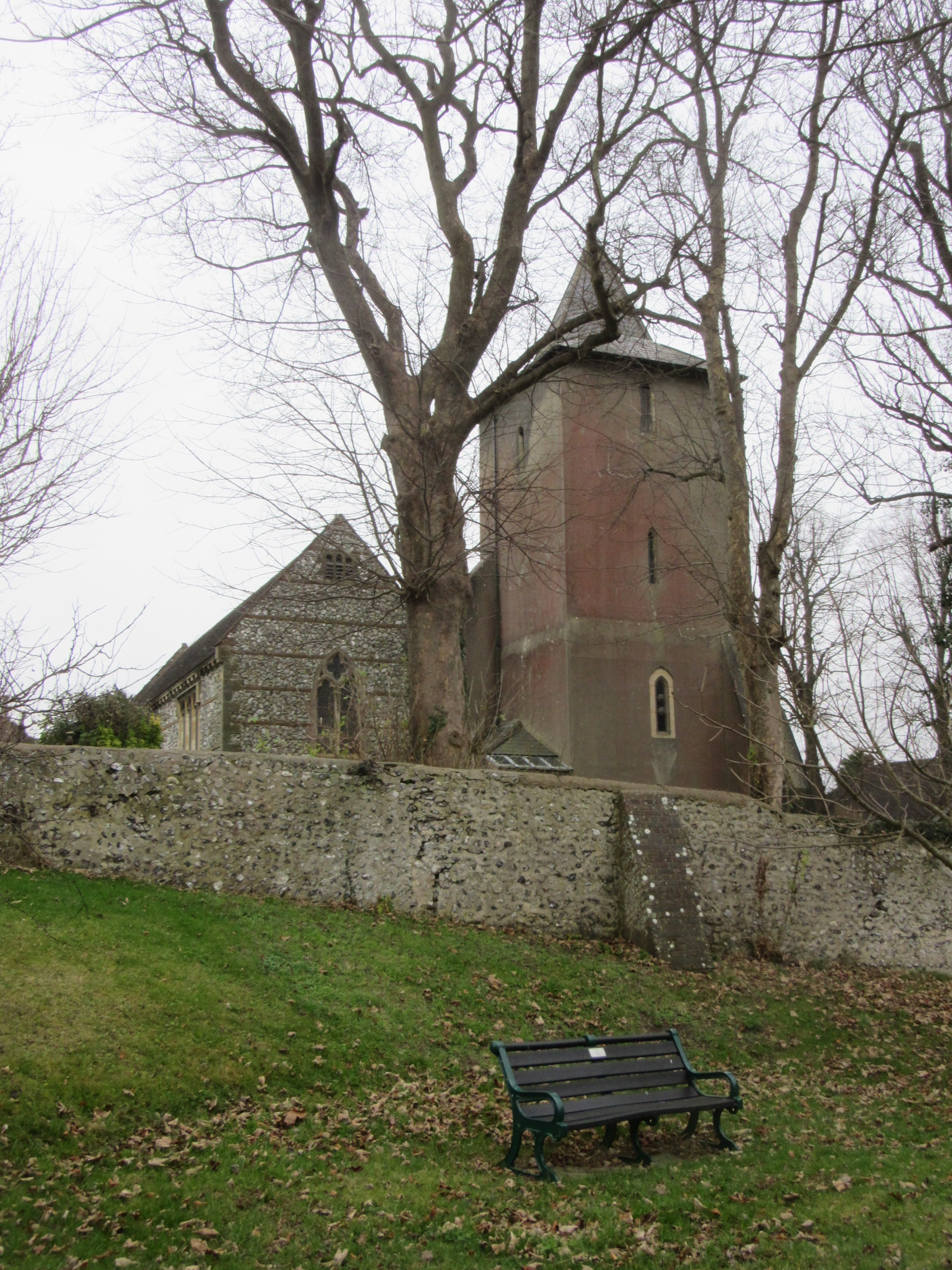
A pond at this location outside All Saints Church, Patcham was the main source of the Wellesbourne.

The Wellesbourne (also spelt Wellsbourne, and occasionally Whalesbone) is a lost river which originally flowed into the English Channel in Brighton, part of the English seaside city of Brighton and Hove. It flowed southwards from Patcham, a village on the edge of the city, down the steep-sided valley along which the A23 London Road and the railway line to London now run. It was always an intermittent stream (a winterbourne) which flowed mostly in the winter and after periods of significant rainfall, and after a waterworks was built in 1889 it permanently stopped flowing.

== Description ==
Brighton's old town lies on the Sussex coastal plain, but immediately behind this is the southern face of the South Downs, of thick and permeable chalk, overlaid on clay. The slopes of the Downs have several steep-sided valleys (combes); the two longest and most important run, respectively, southwestwards for about 4 miles (6.4 km) from Falmer and due south for the same distance from Patcham. They meet near The Level and St Peter's Church, where they join and continue southwards to Old Steine across "a considerable area of level ground", very low-lying and measuring about 400 yards (370 m) wide and 1,100 yards (1,000 m) from north to south. The land was never built up, instead being used for public events and entertainment, and now forms Valley Gardens—a large area of lawns, gardens and public open space. Both valleys have long been dry, and the combe from Falmer is now followed by the Lewes Road, a major route, while the A23 London Road was built along the combe from Patcham.

== History ==
In the Neolithic era, both the Wellesbourne valley and the smaller ones further inland had streams running along them, fed by chalk springs on the Downs. The Wellesbourne was "one of the largest" and deepest. Its main source was a pond (now vanished) outside All Saints Church, the ancient parish church of Patcham village. Water ran from it downhill into the valley, where it met other flows of water from higher up on the Downs as far north as Pyecombe. Another pond at Ladies Mile Road, further south in Patcham, also fed it, and it continued southwards until it reached the English Channel at a location known by the late 15th century as The Poole, and later as Pool Valley. An ancient trackway, later developed into a Roman road, is known to have followed the valley, running alongside the Wellesbourne as far as its mouth. Another Roman road ran west–east along the present Old Shoreham Road and Elm Grove, two major roads in Brighton, and would have formed a junction with the north–south route and then bridged the Wellesbourne. A mill was recorded at Preston, a village along the valley, in the Domesday survey of 1086: it may have been a watermill powered by the Wellesbourne.

The earliest part of the village of Brighton (originally named Bristelmestune) developed in the Saxon era on a small area of high ground, The Knab, on the west bank of the Wellesbourne close to its mouth. The ancient parish was divided by the Wellesbourne and extended on to its east bank. The land around the river was marshy and prone to flooding, and was left undeveloped for many years. Only when Brighton became a fashionable seaside resort in the late 18th century did this change: the southern part of Valley Gardens (present-day Old Steine) became the most popular area for promenading and socialising, and to improve the conditions the Prince of Wales and George Spencer, 4th Duke of Marlborough paid for the Wellesbourne to be culverted. Pool Valley was then paved over as well: originally it was a swampy depression and "the lowest ground in modern Brighton". Drainage was improved further in 1827–28 when the Wellesbourne was culverted all the way from Preston Circus, some way to the north. There had been significant flooding in those years, and the Wellesbourne also flooded its valley in 1795, 1806, 1811, 1852 ("when for many hours there was a perfect river from Patcham to the northern part of Brighton" following a December rainstorm) and 1876. The latter year, when London Road was flooded for 3 miles (4.8 km), was the last time the river flowed above ground, though. In 1889 the river stopped flowing completely when a new waterworks was built near Patcham Tunnel, taking all of its water. After prolonged heavy rain the water table can rise to the surface in places along the London Road valley, though, "giving the appearance of an invisible stream". For example, heavy rain in 1960 and 2000, which caused flooding along London Road and Mill Road in Patcham and in surrounding houses, gave the impression of the Wellesbourne flowing again.

In 1901, when trams were introduced on the streets of Brighton, the council bought a former brewery at Preston Circus and demolished it, intending to build a tram depot there. The culvert constructed for the Wellesbourne in 1827–28 was underneath it, and only when the site was cleared was it realised that the ground could not support the weight of 30 trams and a new building. The depot had to be built on Lewes Road instead.

== Name ==
Mark Antony Lower stated in 1864 that the name simply meant "the stream flowing from a well". The Wellesbourne is presumed to have given its name to the Hundred of Whalesbone, also known as the Hundred of Wellsbourne [sic], an administrative division within the Rape of Lewes which existed by the 13th century and in which Brighton and its surrounding parishes were situated.

The fact that Brighton was originally split in half by the stream has been cited as a reason for the town's name. Historian Antony Dale noted that unnamed antiquaries had suggested an Old English word "brist" or "briz", meaning "divided", could have contributed the first part of the historic name Bristelmestune.

== Bibliography ==
- Carder, Timothy (1990). The Encyclopaedia of Brighton. Lewes: East Sussex County Libraries. ISBN 0-861-47315-9.
- Dale, Antony (1950). The History and Architecture of Brighton. Brighton: Bredin & Heginbothom Ltd.
- Fines, Ken (2002). A History of Brighton & Hove. Chichester: Phillimore & Co. ISBN 1-86077-231-5.
- Gilbert, Edmund M. (1975) [1954]. Brighton: Old Ocean's Bauble. Hassocks: Flare Books. ISBN 0-901759-39-2.
- Lower, Mark Antony (1864). "The Rivers of Sussex: Part II". Sussex Archaeological Collections. 16. doi:10.5284/1085282.
- Toy, David (2016). Brighton's Buses and Trams. London: Capital Transport Publishing. ISBN 978-1-85414-390-7.
