= All Saints Church, Patcham =

Church in East Sussex, England

All Saints, Patcham
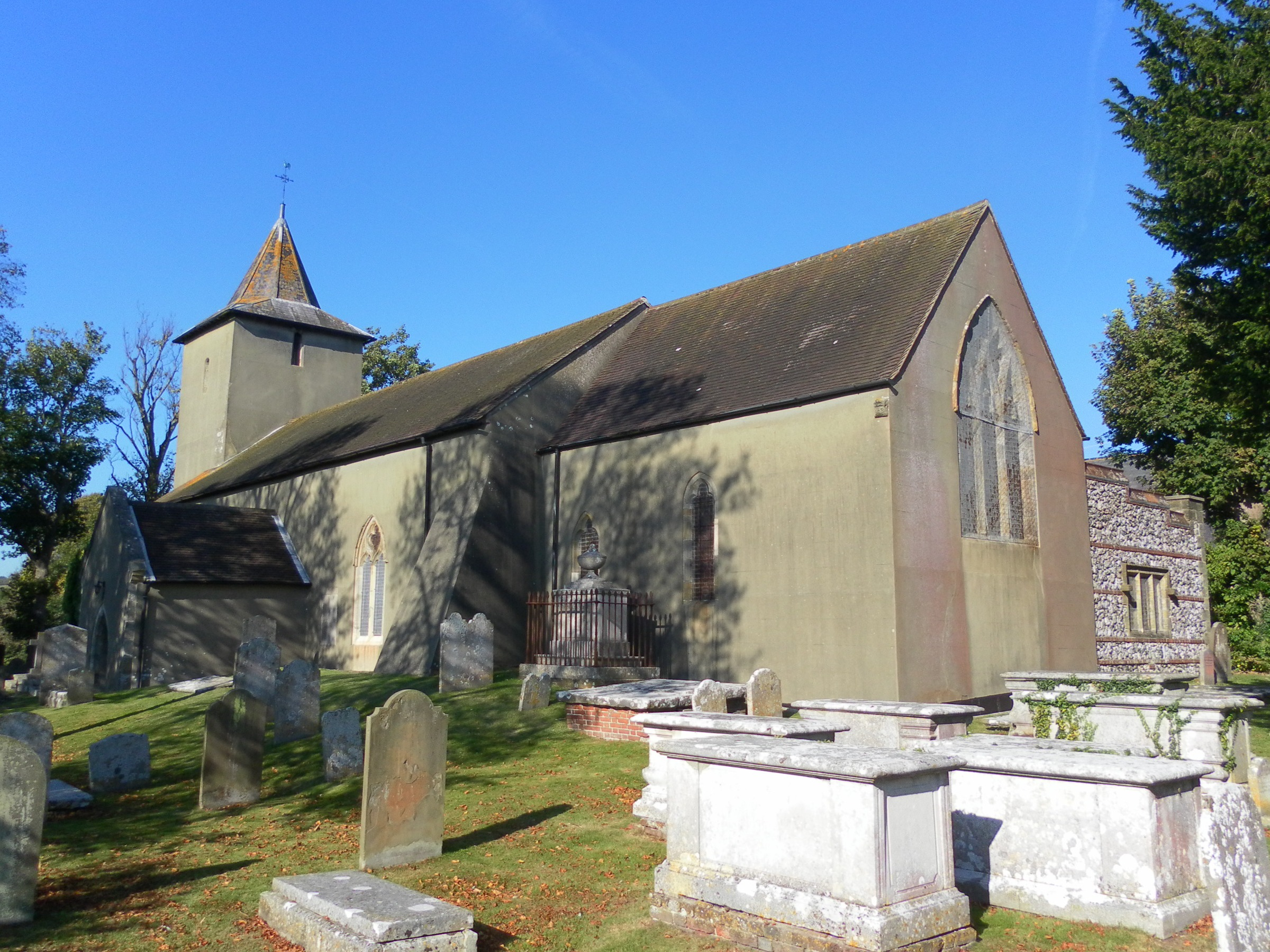
- The church from the southeast
- All Saints, Patcham
- 50°51′59.77″N 0°9′2.54″W
- Denomination: Church of England
- Churchmanship: Open Evangelical
- Website: www.allsaintspatcham.org.uk

History
- Dedication: All Saints

Administration
- Province: Canterbury
- Diocese: Chichester
- Archdeaconry: Chichester
- Deanery: Brighton
- Parish: Patcham, All Saints

All Saints Church is the Anglican parish church of Patcham, an ancient Sussex village which is now part of the English city of Brighton and Hove. A place of worship has existed on the hilltop site for about 1,000 years, but the present building has Norman internal features and a 13th-century exterior. Several rounds of restoration in the Victorian era included some structural additions. A wide range of monuments and wall paintings survive inside, including one commemorating Richard Shelley—owner of nearby Patcham Place and one of the most important noblemen in the early history of Brighton. The church, which is Grade II* listed, continues to serve as the Anglican place of worship for residents of Patcham, which 20th-century residential development has transformed from a vast rural parish into a large outer suburb of Brighton.

Patcham's first church served a large rural area north of the fishing village of Brighthelmston—the ancient predecessor of Brighton. A nucleated settlement developed around this building, which was reconstructed during the Norman era. A wide-ranging series of alterations were carried out by Victorian church restorers to improve the building's structural condition and provide more space to cater for the growing population. As Patcham developed into a suburb in the 20th century, more churches opened in the area and were administered from All Saints Church. The building's plain exterior contrasts with its well-preserved and, in parts, ancient interior whose features include wall paintings and stone memorials. The churchyard has a set of Grade II-listed tombs.

== History ==
The Anglo-Saxon Chronicle records that the area now covered by the county of Sussex was reached by Saxon forces in 477. Within a few years, they controlled land along the English Channel coast as far as Pevensey. By the 10th century, the Kingdom of the South Saxons was fully established; its boundaries match those of the present county. The area was divided into smaller administrative areas called hundreds. Patcham and its neighbouring village of Preston were part of Preston Hundred, one of four hundreds covering present-day Brighton and Hove. The lowest administrative level was the parish, based around a church. The parish of Patcham was recorded (under the name Piceham) at the time of the Domesday survey in 1086, by which time a church existed at the centre of a small village on a spur of land near the top of the South Downs. The parish, which covered 4,325 acres (1,750 ha), was unusually large, and its 11th-century population of about 1,750 was one of the largest for any Sussex parish. William de Warenne, 1st Earl of Surrey, who held most of the land in the local hundreds, owned the manor. The area around the church gradually became the centre of population within the parish, and a village developed on the hillside leading up to the church, east of the modern London Road.

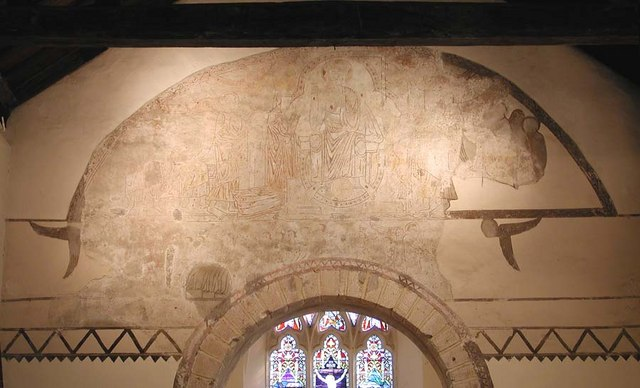
The mural above the chancel arch is 13th-century.

The Saxon church was rebuilt in the 12th and 13th centuries, and the only feature which may survive from that era is a blocked doorway. It was reset in the north aisle when that was built in 1898. The doorway has been described as "Norman or possibly earlier", "pre-[Norman] Conquest" and "could be Saxon" by various sources. The Victoria County History of Sussex goes further by stating it was originally in the north wall of the nave, but identifies it as 12th-century. The chancel arch, a "plain" structure, was inserted between the chancel and the nave in the 12th century, and the nave is of the same period. The 12th-century chancel was added to in the following 200 years; its Decorated Gothic windows are 14th-century. Similar windows were inserted in the nave at the same time.

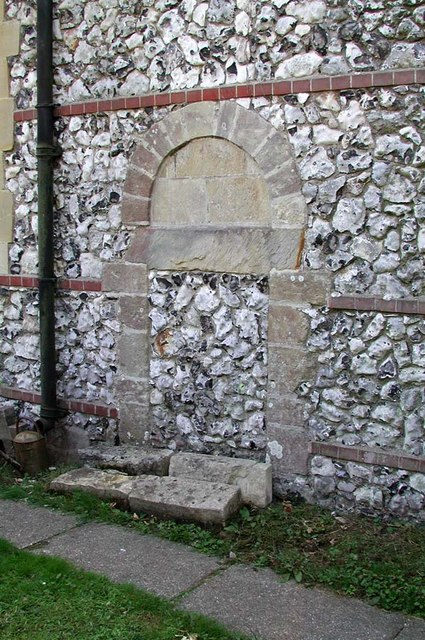
A blocked doorway of Saxon or Norman origin has been reset in the north aisle.

In the 13th century, a narrow tower was built at the west end, with thin lancet windows characteristic of the era. Its broach spire dates from the mid-19th century. The tower was given substantial diagonal buttresses with sandstone quoins. Also at this time, the exterior underwent complete restoration with some rebuilding work. The only other changes made before the 19th century was the addition of a porch at the south end and some buttresses on the south wall of the nave, both in the 16th or 17th century.

Having stood for more than 600 years with little alteration, the church was completely changed by four reconstructions and restorations in a 74-year period in the 19th century. The last of these, in 1898, was the most substantial: it added a north aisle, much larger and taller than the rest of the building, and a vestry. In the early 19th century, the building had been in better structural condition than many in Sussex—a survey in 1825 by Sir Stephen Glynn of the Ecclesiological Society noted that it was "decently fitted up"—but rebuilding ancient churches was fashionable in the Victorian era, and the condition of a surviving medieval corbel suggests that the exterior walls were in poor condition. The three earlier periods of restoration were 1824–25, 1856 and 1880–83. During the third of these, a 13th-century wall painting of Christ in Judgement was discovered above the chancel arch, hidden under 30 layers of whitewash and the remains of two later paintings; it may be one of the oldest such murals in England, but it was repainted after its rediscovery. In 1898, at the same time as the north-side extension, the outside walls of the west, east and south sides were coated with grey cement, probably to improve their structural condition; although this has been described as "unsightly" and "kill[ing] the exterior stone dead", one historian has argued that because many medieval churches were rendered in this way, rather than having uncovered flint walls, it gives the impression of what a typical church of that era may look like.

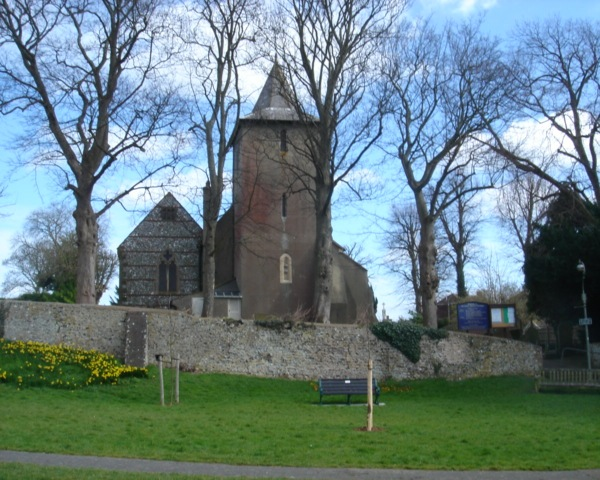
The north aisle (left of the tower), "quite out of proportion", was added in 1898.

Patcham's proximity to the ever-growing resort of Brighton—it is 2 miles (3.2 km) north of the Palace Pier on the English Channel coast—encouraged suburban growth from the mid-19th century. From a low point of 286 in 1801, the population of the village steadily rose and had nearly quadrupled by the time of the United Kingdom Census 1901. Brighton Corporation (the forerunners of the present city council) built an estate of council housing in Moulsecoomb (then still part of Patcham parish) in the early 1920s, and on 1 April 1928 all but 152 acres (62 ha) of the 4,325-acre (1,750 ha) parish were annexed by Brighton to become part of the urban area, known at the time as Greater Brighton. Four large housing estates were built, and the population reached 5,241 in 1930 and continued to rise thereafter. The opening of the north aisle improved capacity at a time when new houses were already surrounding the ancient village centre; but as development spread to more distant parts of the parish, two more churches were opened—both initially as chapels of ease to All Saints Church: a temporary building erected on the Braybon Avenue estate in south Patcham became the Church of Christ the King, which was replaced by a permanent brick-built church in 1958; and in the same year, architect John Wells-Thorpe designed and built the Church of the Ascension in Westdene, a newly developed suburb west of the London Road. The original temporary church at Braybon Avenue became a church hall for Christ the King's congregation, and All Saints Church gained its own hall in 1937 when Mackie Hall was built on Mackie Avenue. It was closed in 1995.

Another round of restoration took place in 1989. The interior was redesigned, and a reredos was made out of old choir stalls which had been removed.

== Memorials ==
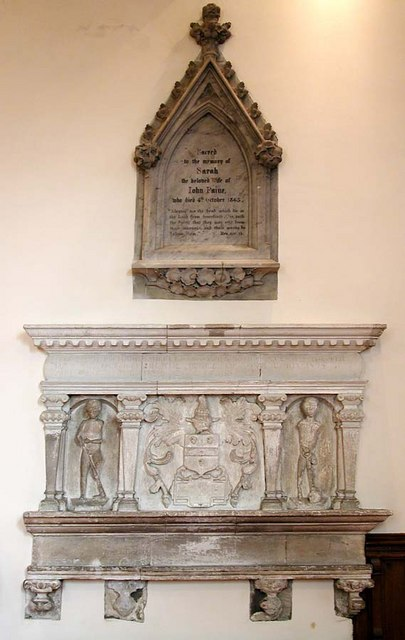
The Paine family of Patcham Place are commemorated by stone memorials.

The church contains several memorials, of which the oldest is a wall tablet commemorating Richard Shelley, one of the earliest owners of Patcham Place, who died in 1594. Patcham Place has its origins in a 16th-century manor house in an isolated position west of the London Road. Its first owner, William West, 1st Baron De La Warr, passed it to Richard Shelley—son of Sir John Shelley of Michelgrove and a member of the family which later became the first Shelley Baronetcy. Shelley lived in Patcham from 1546, and was an important figure in Brighton's early history: in 1579, he and three other local noblemen were appointed by the Privy Council to form a commission to record and regulate the "ancient customs" of the villagers and to mediate between the fishermen and the farmers, who often had conflicting needs. The commissioners produced a book, The Book of All The Auncient [Ancient] Customs heretofore used amonge the fishermen of the Toune of Brighthelmston, whose orders were enshrined in law. The memorial, of which only parts remain intact, is flanked by pilasters, the Shelley coat of arms and a naked grave-digger on each side.

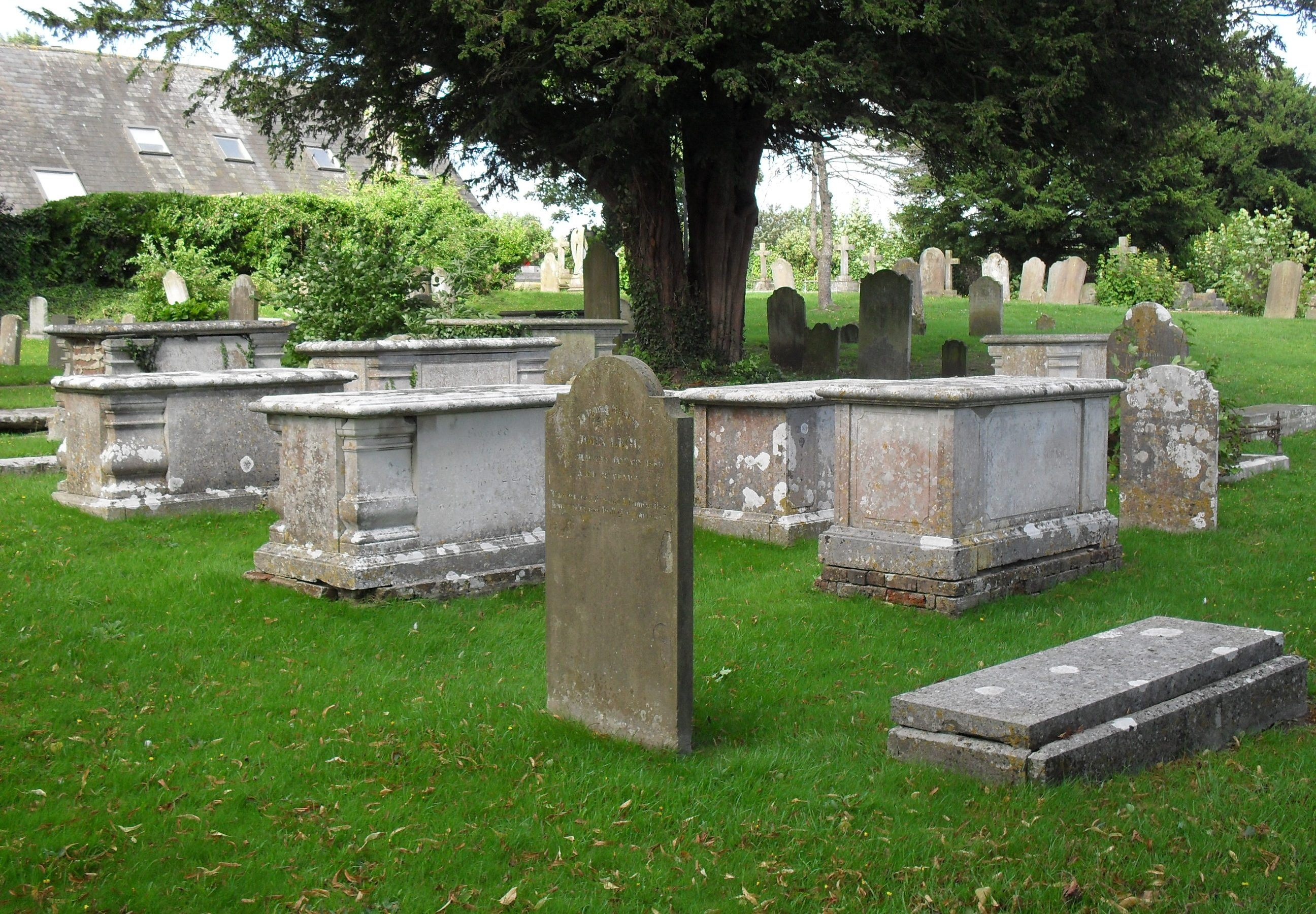
There are many old chest-tombs in the churchyard.

Elsewhere in the church, three generations of the Paine family are commemorated by tablets in the chancel; John Paine of the second generation rebuilt Patcham Place in 1764. He was the uncle by marriage of Thomas Read Kemp, who developed Brighton's high-class Kemp Town estate in the 19th century. The Roe family and its descendants of Withdean are also represented. William Roe and his son William Thomas Roe were closely involved with the former Board of Customs (now Her Majesty's Customs and Excise); William Roe was its chairman for 14 years. William Thomas Roe also served on The Board of Admiralty. His son, his daughter's husband and their son also have their own memorials. The manor of Withdean Cayliffe, one of the manors within the parish of Patcham, passed through the family after William Roe acquired it in 1794.

Outside, there are seven nearly identical chest-tombs, all of which are several centuries old and appear to belong to members of the Scrase family. Together with two unrelated tombs nearby, which are 18th- or early 19th-century, they were listed at Grade II by English Heritage on 26 August 1999. On the north side of the churchyard, which is traditionally used for burials of criminals and those who committed suicide, a memorial survives to "a smuggler, unfortunately shot".

The churchyard contains 16 Commonwealth war graves, comprising two British Army soldiers of World War I buried in the south part, and eight Royal Air Force personnel, five soldiers and a WREN of World War II who are all buried in the churchyard extension.

== Architecture and fittings ==
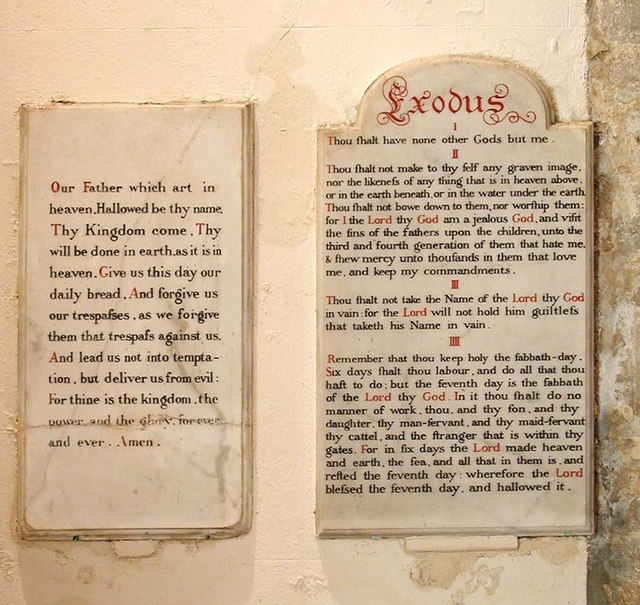
The church has Decalogue tablets on the west wall.

The plan of All Saints Church comprises a west tower with heavy buttresses and a broach spire, a three-bay nave with a tall aisle on the north side (described by one historian as "quite out of proportion to the rest of the building, particularly in height"), and a porch on the south wall, a chancel and a vestry. Although the north aisle of 1898 was flint-built with courses of red brick, the rest of the church's exterior was clad in cement at the same time. Before this, the outside walls had been entirely flint with stone dressings and sandstone quoins. Both sides of the nave are buttressed, as is the southwest corner of the tower. These buttresses may have been added in the 16th century. The roof of the tower, below the squat 19th-century spire, is of slate; the rest of the church has a tiled roof. The porch has a gabled roof above a 14th-century archway. The tower contains three bells. One is dated 1639, and another is known to have been repaired in 1724. The chancel roof is panelled, while the nave roof has vertical queen-post supports with ancient tie-beams.

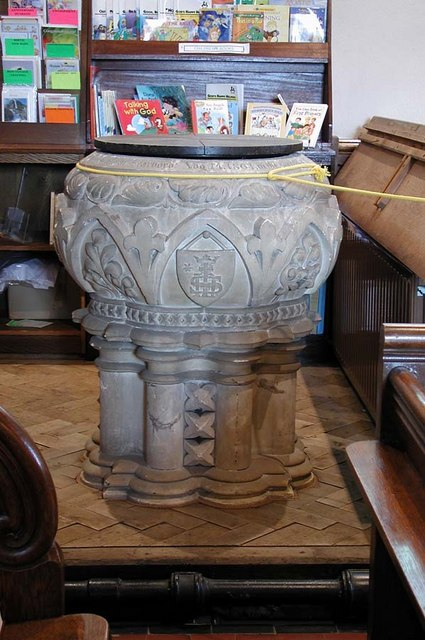
The font dates from 1864.

The nave and chancel are separated by an ancient chancel arch which has recesses for a reredos on each side. These may be contemporary with the 12th-century structure. Above the chancel arch are the remains of a 13th-century wall painting showing Christ in Judgement. It has been dated to c. 1230, and depicts the ascension to Heaven of the dead and the weighing of their souls by Jesus Christ, who is flanked by the Virgin Mary and John the Baptist. The fresco was in fragmentary condition when it was discovered in the 1880s, and has been redrawn. Other paintings may have existed elsewhere on the walls, but none are visible now.

There are lancet windows in the north and south walls and on the tower, some with stone tracery (including the east window in the main body of the church). The chancel and nave windows are 14th-century and in the Decorated Gothic style common at the time, while the tower windows and bell-openings are smaller and in the Early English style popular in the 13th century, when the tower was built. The largest window, which sits under a hoodmould, is in the east end of the chancel; it is a three-light lancet with prominent tracery in the curvilinear/reticulated style. The window dates from the 14th century, which may make it the same age as a small window next to the porch, which has twin lights with foliated heads set below a quatrefoil in an ogive arch. Both windows also have scrollwork drip-moulds. Most other windows are plain trefoil-headed single lancets.

The blocked doorway in the modern north aisle is the oldest surviving part of the church. Its lintel is 10 inches (25 cm) thick and sits below 11 voussoirs, each about 8 inches (20 cm) across. Below the lintel, the former opening is 6.8 feet (2.1 m) high and 2.75 feet (0.84 m) wide; gradual settling into the ground has masked its original 7.5-foot (2.3 m) height. The jambs are made up of five stones of equal height, but the uppermost is wider because it served as an impost. Inside the church, the jambs and arch are visible, but there is no lintel.

The wall of the chancel retains a trefoil-arched piscina added during the 14th-century restoration work. The font—a "rather florid circular" example—dates from 1864, and the church possesses Eucharistic objects dating from the 16th and 17th centuries, such as a chalice of 1568 and a paten dating from 1666. The west wall has a wide range of old carved prayer and commandment boards, which are a common feature of Sussex churches. Ancient examples of graffiti, consisting of etched crosses and dates, also survives inside; such "curious carvings" are also common in Sussex.

== Current status ==
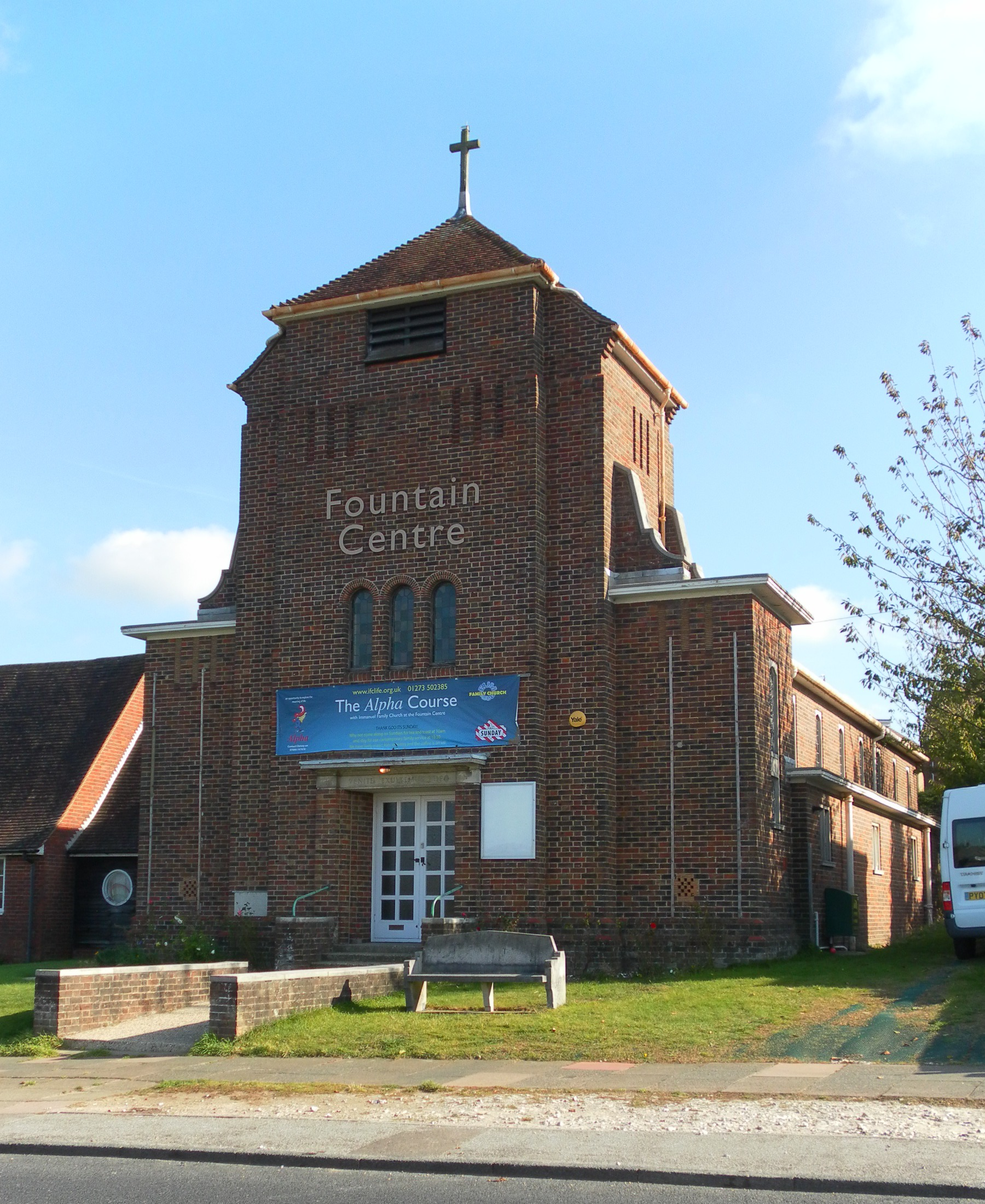
The former Church of Christ the King was declared redundant in 2006, and part of its parish was ceded to All Saints' Church.

All Saints' Church was listed at Grade II* on 13 October 1952. Worship at All Saints is in the Open Evangelical style. There is a Sunday school and regular youth group.

All Saints is the church in the Benefice of Patcham All Saints, which also incorporates the Church of the Ascension in Westdene, a postwar suburb west of Patcham. This is a modern building of brick and glass, designed in 1958 by architect John Wells-Thorpe. The ecclesiastical parish of All Saints covers the north of Brighton and its rural hinterland, incorporating Withdean, Westdene, Patcham, Hollingbury, part of Preston (as far south as Preston Park railway station), and the scattered residential buildings north of the A27 Brighton Bypass and south of Pyecombe.

Following a review by the Diocese of Chichester in 2005, parts of the west side of the parish were transferred to the Church of the Good Shepherd on Dyke Road in Brighton, and at the south end another section was ceded to St John the Evangelist's Church in Preston Village. At the same time the decision was taken to close the Church of Christ the King (which had been the parish church of South Patcham) and divide its parish between All Saints and St John the Evangelist's churches. All Saints' Church therefore received the congregation from the northern part of the Church of Christ the King's parish. The diocese declared the Church of Christ the King redundant from 1 December 2006, but from 20 July 2007 it was in use again as a place of worship. In that year, two displaced congregations whose churches had been demolished joined to form a new church community, which bought the building and renamed it the Fountain Centre. The Elim Balfour Road Church in Preston Village, a Pentecostal church, was demolished in 2007, and the Immanuel Community Church had been using the former St Augustine's Church building near Preston Park since the destruction by fire of their church in Hanover, Brighton in 2003.

== See also ==
- Grade II* listed buildings in Brighton and Hove
- List of places of worship in Brighton and Hove
