= Westdene =

Coordinates: 50.859305°N 0.161507°W

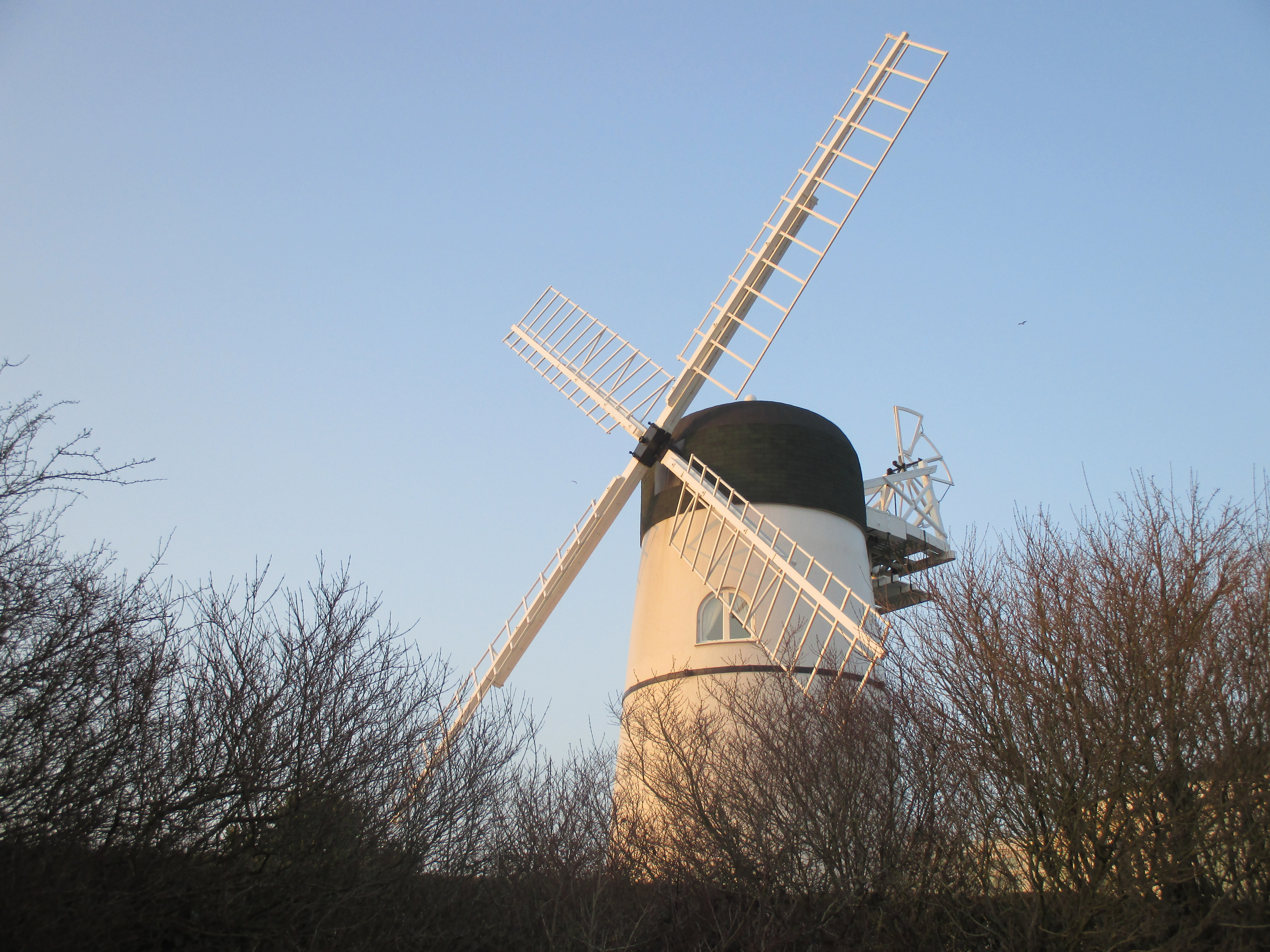
- Waterhall Mill

- Location within East Sussex
- Unitary authority: Brighton and Hove
- Ceremonial county: East Sussex
- Region: South East
- Country: England
- Sovereign state: United Kingdom
- Post town: Brighton
- Postcode district: BN1
- Dialling code: 01273
- Police: Sussex
- Fire: East Sussex
- Ambulance: South East Coast
- UK Parliament: Brighton Pavilion

Westdene is an area of the city of Brighton and Hove, East Sussex. It is a northern suburb of the city, west of Patcham, the A23 (London Road) and the London to Brighton railway line, north of Withdean and northeast of West Blatchington. It is on the Brighton side of the historic parish boundary between Brighton and Hove and is served by Preston Park railway station. It is known for its greenery and woodland and is very close to the South Downs, from which it is separated by the Brighton Bypass, and was built on the slopes of two hills.

== History ==
The first part of the suburb to be developed was part of Valley Drive, on which around 30 houses were built in the "Tudorbethan" style between 1932 and 1934. In 1938, local building firm Braybon Ltd signed a contract with Brighton Corporation to develop 168 acres (68 ha) of land nearby as an extension of the Withdean estate, with low-density housing of various types. Braybon had bought the land a year earlier. The Second World War intervened and, although the similarly-styled Tudorbethan bungalows of Barn Rise were completed by London builders G.T. Crouch Ltd, most of the subsequent building work took place in the 1950s & 60s.

Small greens and open spaces were provided, as were some shopping facilities. The central green was the site of a short-lived bowling green, and an 18th-century barn that was part of a farm survived on the site until the mid-1960s.

Westdene F.C. were established in 1983. Later called Withdean F.C. and then Withdean 2000 F.C., they had success in the Sussex County Football League and the Combined Counties Football League, winning the latter in the 2002–03 season, before going out of existence in 2004.

== Notable buildings and areas ==
The area has a church and a primary school. The Church of the Ascension is part of the parish of All Saints Church, Patcham, and was opened in February 1958; John Wells-Thorpe built the brick and glass structure. The school dates from 1961 and the library was opened in March 1964.

=== Waterhall Mill ===
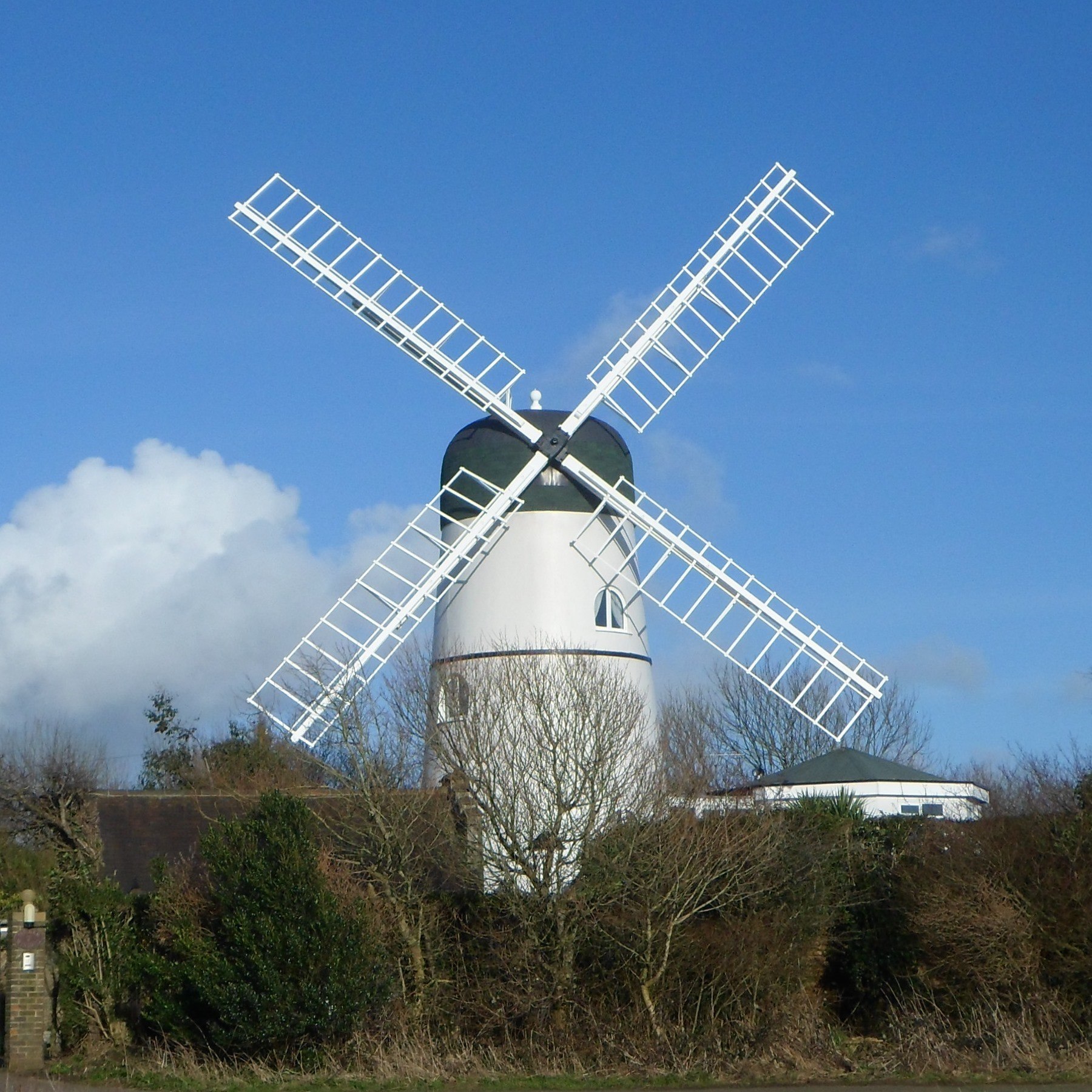
Waterhall (Patcham) Mill, off Mill Road, Waterhall

Waterhall Mill, also known as Westdene Mill or Patcham Windmill, is a disused tower mill. It is on the slopes of Coney Hill just north of Westdene. It was built in 1885 by James Holloway of Shoreham, and is believed to be the last brick windmill built in Sussex. Two of the staircases are said to have originated in St Paul's Cathedral. In World War II it was used by the Home Guard as a lookout post. Waterhall Mill was awarded Grade II listed status by English Heritage on 13 October 1952. It was converted into a domestic house in 1964.

=== Waterhall ===
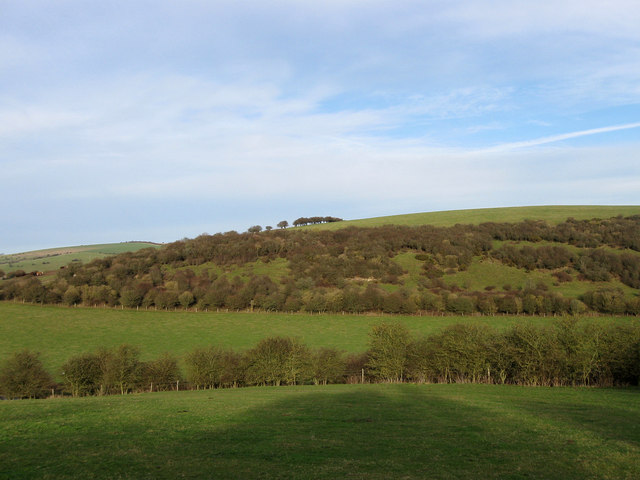
Varncombe Hill

Waterhall (TQ 284 087), an area of football and rugby pitches. It is sandwiched between Saddlescombe Road and the A23 which runs north to London. The Brighton rugby club is situated at the west end.

=== The old Waterhall Golf Course ===
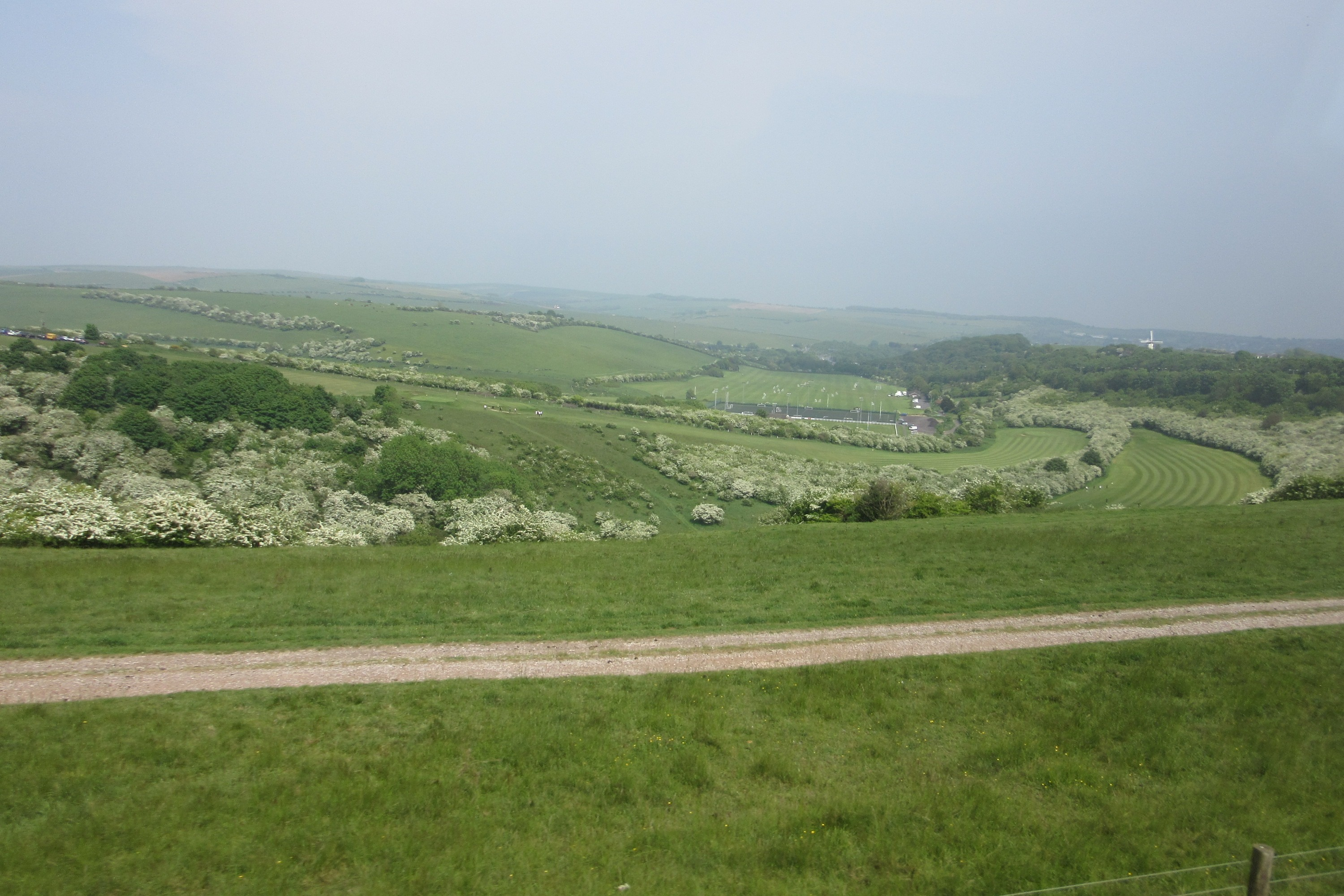
Waterhall from Devil's Dyke Road, Brighton (when still a Golf Course))

To the north of the club is the old Waterhall Golf Course, which was given over to rewilding in 2021. Since the Golf Course has been closed and rewilding has started summer downland flowers are already returning and harebell, scabious, cowslip, rockrose, betony, Sussex rampion and horseshoe vetch have all been seen in the area. There are large old anthills and chalkhill, small and adonis blue and brown argus butterflies. There is still a reasonable population of adders. By the bridlepath just downhill of the old clubhouse there are the damaged remains of a Bronze Age round barrow (TQ 283 087) which has long acted as a marker on the old parish boundaries and at the corner of the Saddlescombe Road and the turn-off to the golf clubhouse there is a sarsen stone (TQ 278 090) marking this point in the medieval boundary between Patcham and West Blatchington parishes.

=== Varncombe Hill ===
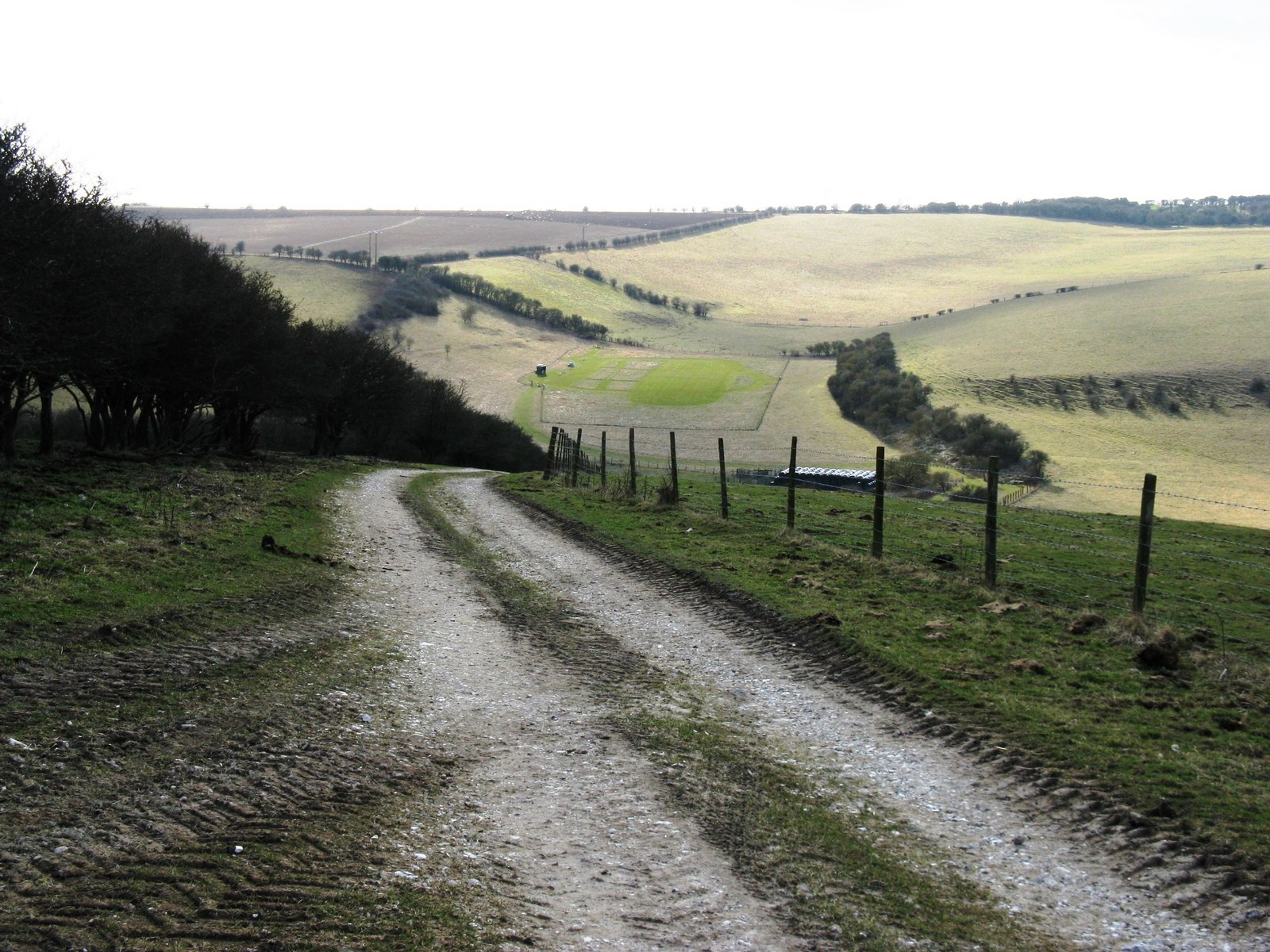
Bridleway down Varncombe Hill

At the north end of the old Golf Course is Varncombe Hill which borders the Newtimber parish. The south-west facing slope(TQ 280 099) is a bosky place with lovely old pasture glades. Rockrose is one of the commonest flowers here, with some of its associated fungi. The west facing slopes of Varncombe Hill (TQ 279 105) were sold by Brighton Council with the rest of Saddlescombe Farm to the National Trust, but the Trust did not dedicate them as Access Land, though some have argued that they should have done.

=== Sweet Hill ===
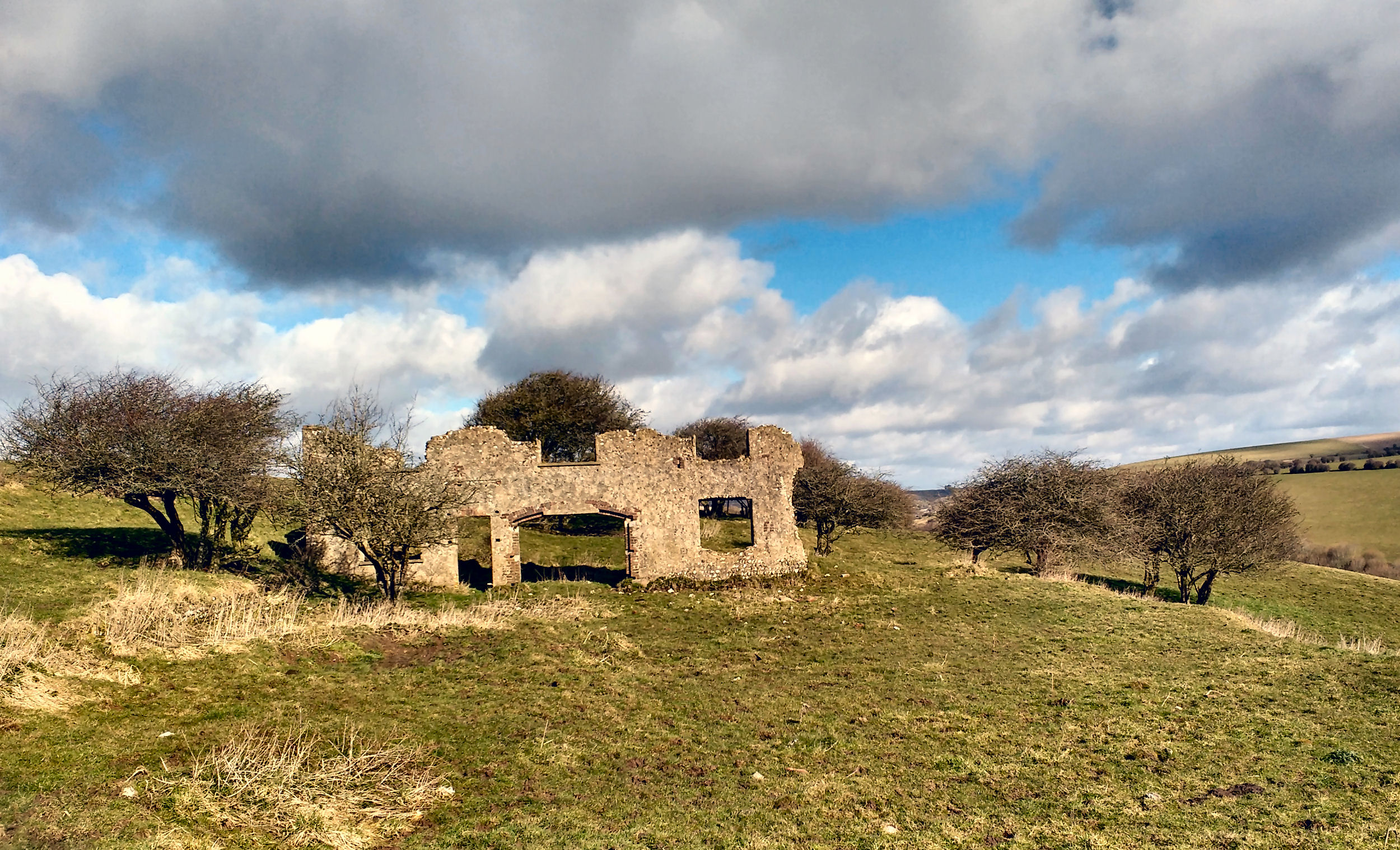
Sweet Hill, near Patcham, Brighton, The old farm house

The tracks rising to the east of Waterhall take you to Sweet Hill. The Hill has a flowery bank on its western slope (TQ 286 091), a bushy lynchet and an old dewpond site on its brow. The track joins a branch of the Mid Sussex Sussex Border Path and continues northwest to the Newtimber parish leaving Pangdean Bottom and the Pyecombe parish to the north east.

=== Pangdean Bottom ===
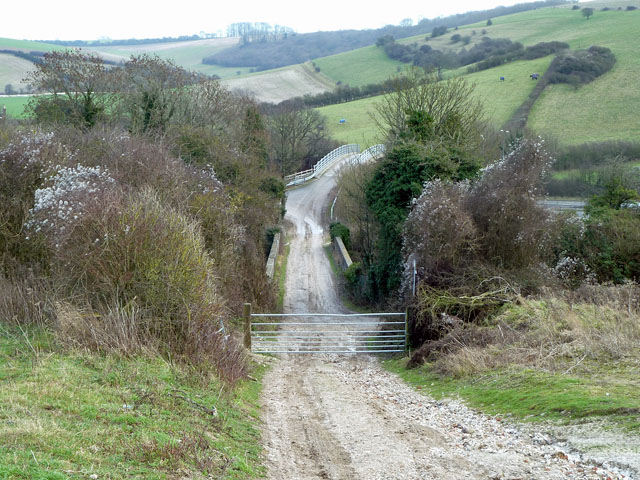
Rail and road bridges, Pangdean

Pangdean Bottom is the west of the A23 and is rented by a tenant farmer from Brighton and Hove City Council, who have owned it since 1924. It includes ancient chalk grassland slopes where there are still chalkland flowers and butterflies and many believe it should have been designated Access land status. In late summer, the valley's north side has one of the largest populations of autumn ladies-tresses orchid has been recorded, together with a large population of the white variety of the self heal violet. The scrub at the head of the valley is old and diverse, with wayfaring tree, old man's beard, honeysuckle, hazel, and gorse.

In July 2021 the Sussex-based 'Landscapes of Freedom' group, together with Nick Hayes and Guy Shrubsole of the 'Right to Roam' network, organised a mass trespass in protest against the lack of public access to this valley and its management for game bird shooting, which has badly affected its chalk grassland wildlife. Over three hundred people walked from Waterhall, Brighton, to Pangdean Bottom in protest. The public are actively discouraged from walking in the area and scrub has been allowed to grow on the pristine downland, whilst other parts have been ploughed out.

== Bibliography ==
- Carder, Timothy (1990). The Encyclopaedia of Brighton. Lewes: East Sussex County Libraries. ISBN 0-86147-315-9.
