= Patcham High School =

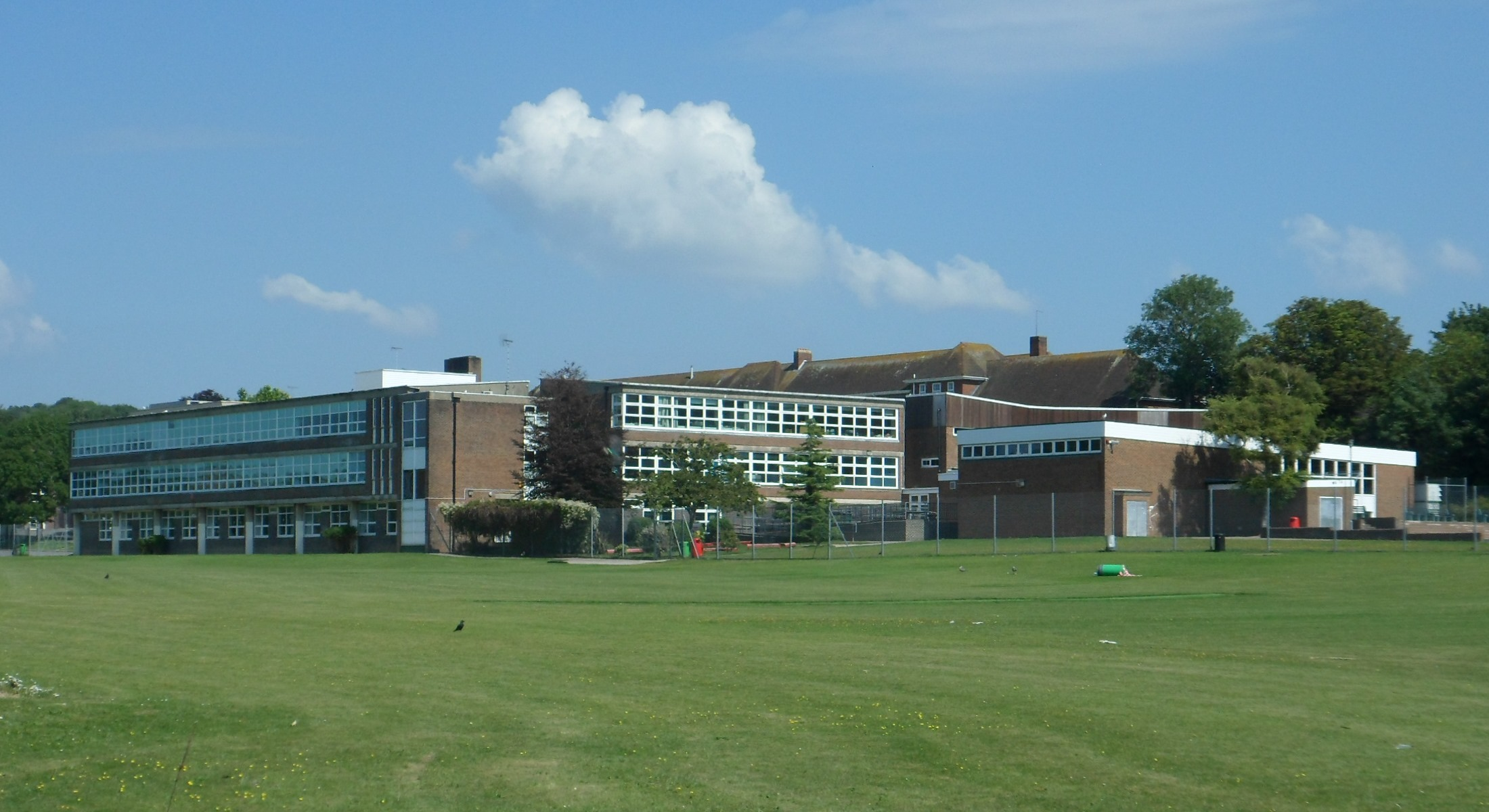

Location
- Ladies Mile Road; Brighton, East Sussex, BN1 8PB; England; 50°51′44″N 0°08′38″W

Information
- Type: Community school
- Motto: One Team, One Dream
- Established: 1990
- Local authority: Brighton and Hove
- Department for Education URN: 114608 Tables
- Ofsted: Reports
- Headteacher: John McKee.
- Gender: Coeducational
- Age: 11 to 16
- Enrolment: 1050
- Website: http://www.patchamhigh.brighton-hove.sch.uk/

Patcham High School is one of nine secondary schools in Brighton, located in the village of Patcham. It has around 1,000 pupils. The head teacher is John McKee.

The school was founded on 7 July 1990, when Margaret Hardy school for girls and Patcham Fawcett school for boys were combined. The school is on Ladies Mile Road in Patcham.

Margaret Hardy and Patcham Fawcett were the last two single sex schools in Brighton, and Patcham High School now serves the north of Brighton, situated next to the South Downs. The logo is that of the Chattri, an Indian War Memorial that can be seen from Patcham.

In 2014, Patcham High School won The Argus school of the year award.

Patcham High School has undergone marked improvement in teaching standards latterly. After being assigned ‘inadequate’ in its 2006 Ofsted inspection, it achieved ‘satisfactory’ status in 2007 and 2010. In its 2013 and 2017 inspections the school was awarded a ‘good’ rating by Ofsted. The school also received a 'good' rating following its 2023 inspection.

Construction of an AstroTurf pitch on the school grounds commenced in March 2021 and was completed in June 2021.
