= Patcham =

Area of Brighton and Hove, England

Coordinates: 50.864°N 0.15°W

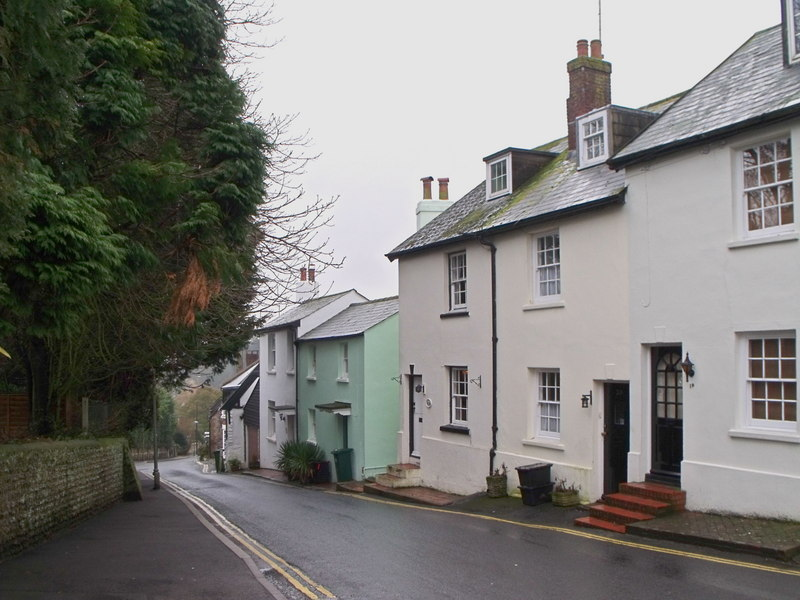

- Location within East Sussex
- Population: 14,277 (2011.Ward)
- Unitary authority: Brighton & Hove
- Ceremonial county: East Sussex
- Region: South East
- Country: England
- Sovereign state: United Kingdom
- Post town: BRIGHTON
- Postcode district: BN1
- Dialling code: 01273
- Police: Sussex
- Fire: East Sussex
- Ambulance: South East Coast
- UK Parliament: Brighton Pavilion

Patcham (/ˈpætʃəm/) is a suburb in the city of Brighton and Hove, in the ceremonial county of East Sussex, England. It is about 3 miles (5 km) north of the city centre. It is bounded by the A27 (Brighton bypass) to the north, Hollingbury to the east and southeast, Withdean to the south and the Brighton Main Line to the west. The A23 passes through the area.

== History ==
Patcham was originally a separate village that developed around the partly 12th- and 13th-century All Saints' Church. The parish of Patcham extended to 32 square miles (83 km^{2}) and encompassed large parts of what are now adjacent suburbs, such as Withdean, Westdene, Hollingbury and Tongdean. It extended eastwards into modern-day Moulsecoomb, westwards beyond Dyke Road into Hove, and northwards across the sparsely populated South Downs towards the parishes of Pyecombe and Ditchling. The centre of the original village, based around the church (on Church Hill) and the Old London Road – now bypassed by the modern A23 – is a conservation area, and several buildings are listed.

=== Modern Patcham ===
Sir Herbert Carden, a prominent Brighton solicitor who was mayor for three years from 1916 and served on the council from 1895 until 1941, was responsible for the boundary changes on 1 April 1928 which brought Patcham within the "Greater Brighton" area. To commemorate this, two large stone pillars, known as the "Pylons", were erected on the A23 just north of the village of Patcham, marking the new boundary line. The land around the village was mostly undeveloped at this time, but many houses were later built. Many of the estates built around the old village date from the 1930s. The Ladies Mile Estate, built around the former drove road from the village to Stanmer Park, is an example; it is separated from Hollingbury to the southeast by Carden Avenue, named after Sir Herbert.

The roads around the Mackie Avenue estate (all with Scottish names) were named by the Scottish builder George Ferguson who developed the estate. He also planted the Scots pines on the Ladies Mile Open Space.

In 1921 the civil parish had a population of 1768. On 1 April 1928 the parish was abolished and merged with "Brighton" and "Hove".

== Notable buildings and areas ==
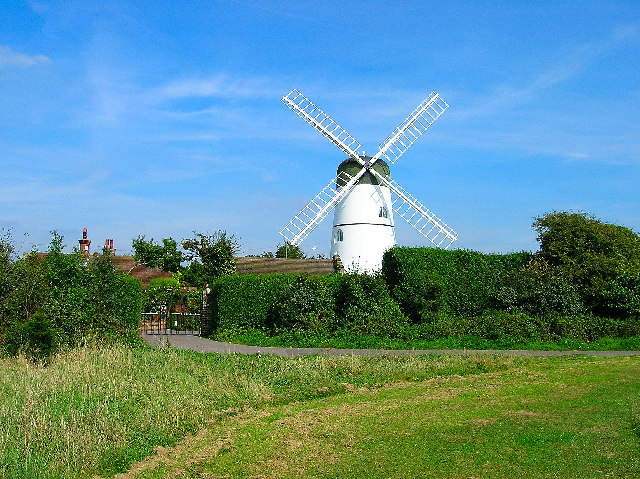
Waterhall Mill

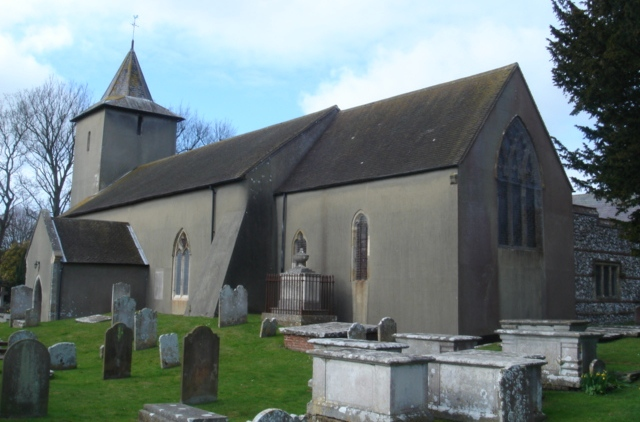

Patcham Mill is a converted windmill on high ground west of the old village (but within the former Patcham parish). Also known as Waterhall Mill and locally as Westdene Mill, it was built in 1885 and was used for 40 years. A second mill, now demolished, stood on a site near Overhill Drive and is commemorated by the street name Old Mill Close. Patcham mill on Sussex Mills website

Patcham Place (Photo) was the city's Youth Hostel until September 2007. It is in the old village centre opposite the former post office, in a large area of open parkland. Below it the Brighton Main Line runs through the 492-yard (450 m) Patcham Tunnel. The house dates from 1558 and was originally the seat of the Shelley family. It later belonged to the Stapley family – Anthony Stapley played a leading part in the Civil War, being Governor of Chichester and a Regicide.

All Saints' Church, Patcham In September 2014, the Patcham Post Office relocated from its site in Old London Road to Salmons Newsagents, further along the Old London Road.

All Saints Church (website) is one of the city of Brighton and Hove's oldest churches, and is still a lively community of people. A church was recorded on this site in the Domesday Book. The churchyard includes an interesting gravestone marked with a pirate skull and crossbones motif. Close to the church stand an ancient dovecot and a converted tithe barn.

=== Ladies Mile local nature reserve ===
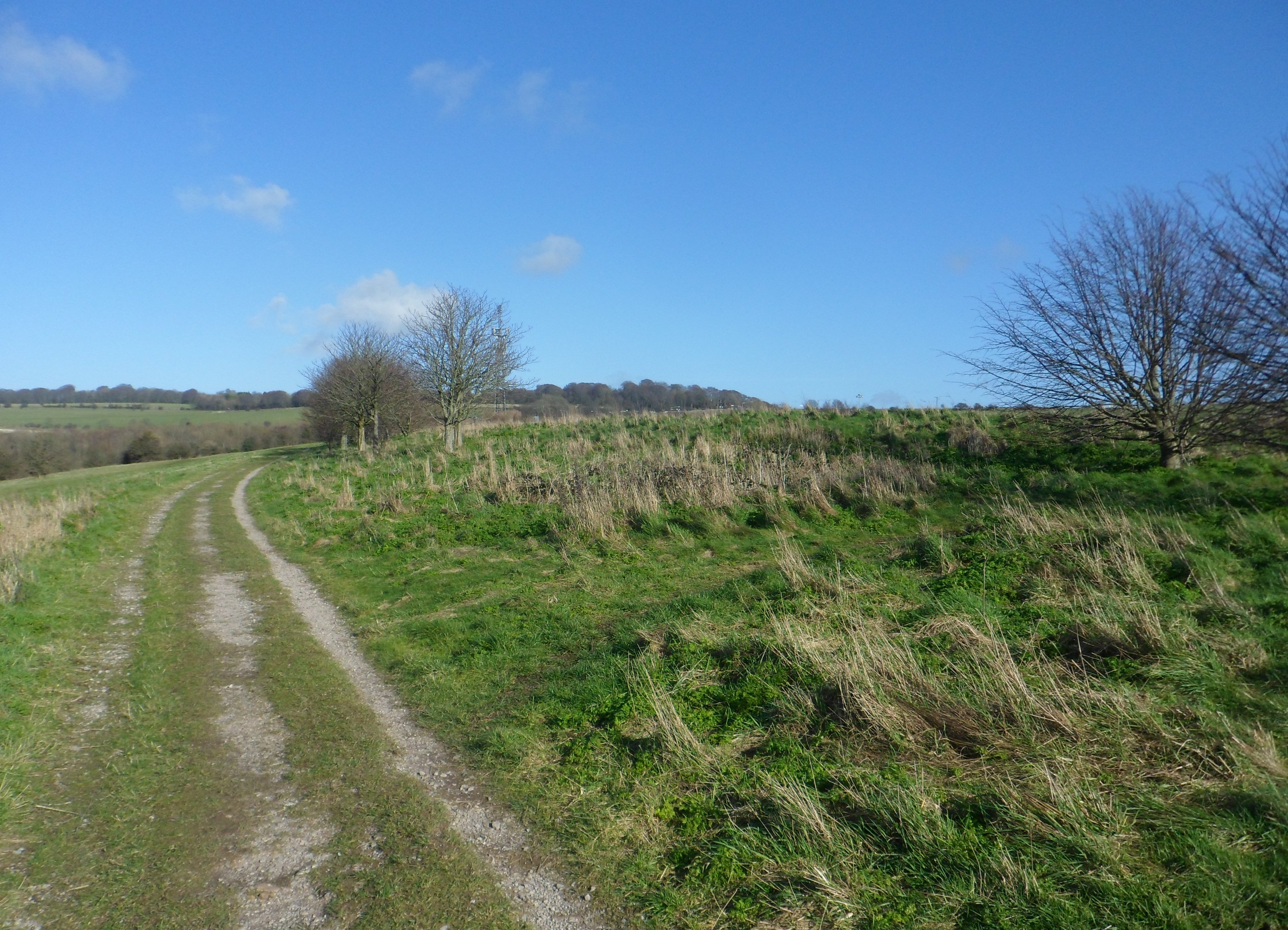
Southwestward view along Ladies Mile, Patcham

To the south of the A27 and on the western edge of Patcham is Ladies Mile Down (TQ 318 093). The area is a remarkable survival of plateau chalk grassland on Downland where almost all such flattish sites have been destroyed by modern farming and has been designated as Local nature reserve. The ancient turf has preserved lots of odd linear banks which are surviving fragments of an Iron Age and Romano-British lynchetted field system. The banks once stretched across the line of the A27 bypass, beyond which one or two more fragments also survive. At the eastern end of the Down is a Bronze Age burial mound recognisable by a low, grassy tump.The area is rich summer flowers. Harebell, Sussex rampion flower, rockrose and yellow rattle are enjoyed by locals here and at midsummer there are still good numbers of glowworms. Later in the summer months the violet-blue of devil’s-bit scabious and the powder-blue lesser scabious radiate.

=== Patcham downland ===
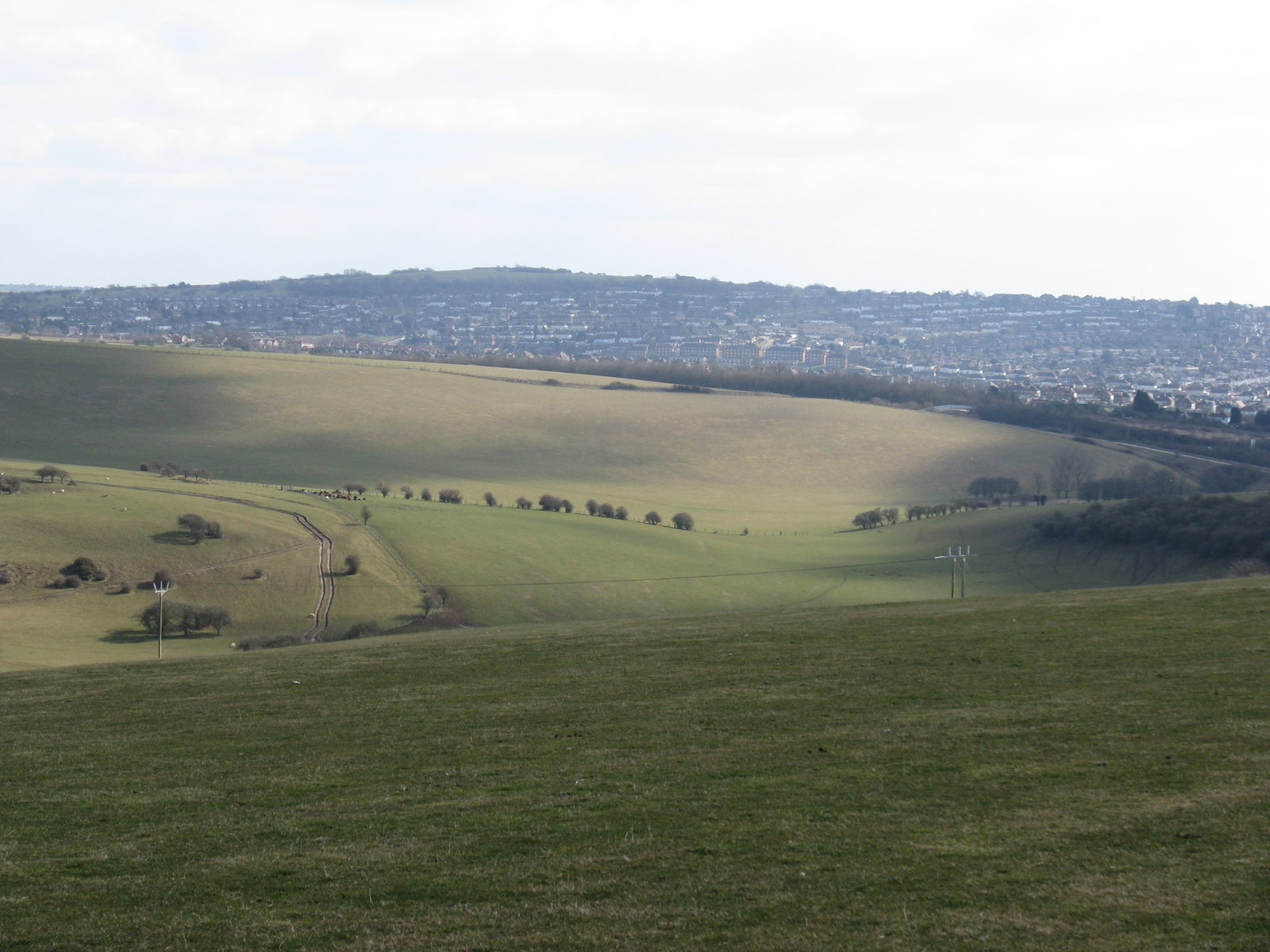
Ewe Bottom from the Sussex Border Path - geograph.org.uk - 1748020

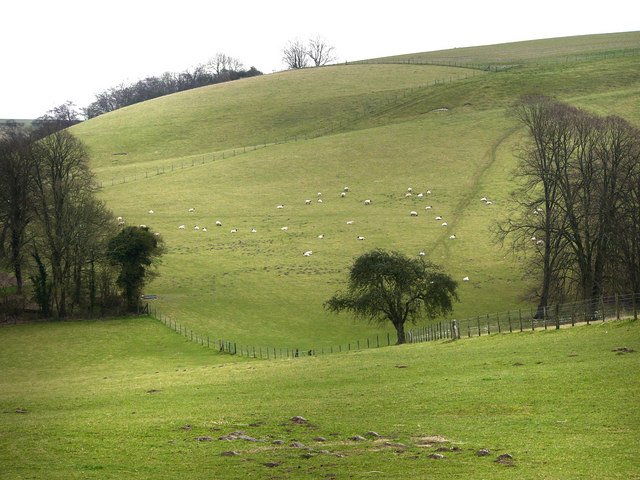
Sheep on Tegdown Hill

The downland to the north of Patcham leads up to Ditchling Beacon and the western end of the Clayton to Offham Escarpment. Tegdown Hill is the next hill to the west of the downland Ditchling Road. A remarkable ‘ring barrow’ survives (TQ 313 101) on its brow, together with the slight mounds of two other bowl barrows. Tegdown ring barrow has been described as “probably the best of this type in the county”. It consists of a circular bank with a ditch and a flattish interior. It lies just south of a big dried up dew pond. From Tegdown you can see the three Iron Age camps of Hollingbury Castle, Ditchling Beacon and the Devil’s Dyke. To the north of the city boundary is the long Ditchling parish.

The Mid Sussex track of the Sussex Border Path starts at the A27 roundabout and the eastern track takes you up Ewebottom Hiil leaving Scare Hill to its west, passing the Chattri to the east and on to Holt Hill and the Pyecombe parish. The western track takes you to Waterhall across the A23.

Those walking from Patcham towards Standean farm descend the hill into Ewe Bottom and have the pleasure of the intact, old Tegdown pastures to their right, where the meadows can be full of chalk downland flowers. Opposite the slope is the mouth of Deep Bottom (TQ 303 105), the southerly slope of which is a colourful old pasture site with abundant rockrose and which rises up to the Chattri. In autumn there are boletes and several old meadow waxcaps and a fairy club fungus.

== Amenities ==
=== Patcham Community Centre ===
The Patcham Community Centre is run by the Patcham Community Association, which was formed in 1945. There were originally 15 groups involved, including the Patcham Communist Party, and for the first 24 years they existed without their own centre, holding meetings in the school halls in the area.

At the same time Alderman Kippin (known as 'Mr Patcham') arranged for a combined community centre and youth club, each with its own suite of rooms but sharing a kitchen, to be included in the basement of a new wing of the Margaret Hardy school.

After the 1989 merger of Fawcett and Margaret Hardy into Patcham High brought the boys and girls together on Warmdene Road, more space was needed. In 2003 a PFI project overhauled the school buildings and a new Community Building erected just outside the High school grounds to incorporate both the community centre and the community library.

The new centre is now a hub of activity for local people, with over 40 different organisations using it, in addition to hosting many family celebrations.

=== Schools in Patcham ===
Patcham High School has its roots in a school opened on 3 September 1928, as the Brighton Intermediate School, in the premises formerly occupied by the girls' secondary school (later Varndean School for Girls) in York Place. Additional rooms were used at 99 Trafalgar Street until January 1931 when the old premises of the boys' secondary school became available. All years bar the first year were then transferred to these premises.

In September 1931 separate departments for boys and girls were established, and were known as the Intermediate School for Girls (later the Margaret Hardy High School for Girls,) and Intermediate School for Boys respectively. From October 1945 the boys' school was re-named the Patcham Fawcett County Secondary School for Boys. In July 1965 the Patcham County Secondary School in Warmdene Road was closed; the boys were transferred to the Patcham Fawcett County Secondary School which then became known as the Patcham Fawcett School and the girls to the Margaret Hardy County Secondary School. New premises for the school were opened in September 1965 at Ladies Mile Road, Patcham. In 1989 it amalgamated with the Margaret Hardy High School for Girls and became Patcham High School.

At the time of relocation, while Patcham Fawcett was housed in new premises at the top of Ladies Mile Road, Margaret Hardy was housed in classrooms previously used by Patcham High School. Patcham First School, at the time housed in the southern part of what is now the Patcham Junior School building, relocated to brand new buildings in Highview Avenue North, permitting expansion of the junior school (briefly Patcham Middle School in the 1970s).

The Windmill View estate at the top of Ladies Mile Road is built on the site of the old Patcham Fawcett School.

Patcham House School, located on Old London Road, was a school for pupils aged 11–16 with complex needs. It opened in the 1860s as a National School, a church-funded initiative to provide education to the poor. The original flint building still stands today, and is included on the council's Local List of Heritage Assets. The school came under council control in 1919, and was renamed Patcham County School. Eventually the County School, having outgrown the buildings and been forced to split classes between this building, Patcham Place and Mackie Hall, relocated to its current location on the corner of Ladies Mile Road and Warmdene Road, leaving the site to be adopted by Patcham House during the 1960s.

It closed in July 2018 as part of a reorganisation of Special Educational Needs provision in Brighton and Hove.

=== Transport ===
Brighton & Hove runs routes 5, 5A and N5 (from Hangleton via the city centre) which do a circular tour of the eastern side of Patcham. Route 5A goes through the centre of the old village, while Route 5 deviates onto Carden Avenue, and the N5 goes along the 5b route after serving Patcham. Both of the 5 and 5A routes have a 20-minute daytime frequency. The N5 is hourly between 1:00 am and 4:00 am (Thursday to Saturday).

Compass Travel run the hourly Route 52: this starts in the village centre and passes through the Ladies Mile Estate en route to Hollingbury Asda, the City Centre and the Knoll Estate in Hove.

Some other services stop on the A23 outside the Black Lion pub near the Youth Hostel:

- Countryliner Coaches buses have gone into administration, so the outlook for their routes is uncertain: they ran route 40/40X (Brighton county hospital to Cuckfield, Mondays to Sunday) route 33 (to Haywards Heath via Hassocks Monday to Friday)
- Metrobus routes 270 (to East Grinstead Daily), 271 (to Haywards Heath and Crawley via Burgess Hill Daily), 273 (to Crawley, Mondays to Saturdays)
- Stagecoach South (Mondays to Saturdays), Sussex Coaches (Sundays) route 17 to Horsham

After the Second World War, Patcham was served by Brighton Hove & District Transport with bus routes 5 and 5b running jointly every 7 or 8 minutes from Brighton via the London Road to Carden Avenue, Winfield Avenue, The Ladies Mile (Ladies Mile Clock Tower) and Mackie Avenue. Route 15 operated every 20 minutes from Brighton via the London Road to Carden Avenue, Winfield Avenue, The Ladies Mile (Clock Tower) and Barrhill Avenue to Braeside Avenue(The Deeside). Route 15b operated every 20 minutes from Brighton via London Road to Patcham Water Fountain, Patcham Old Village, Ladies Mile Road to Portfield Avenue .
