= Waterhall Mill, Patcham =

19th Century Tower Mill

Westdene Windmill
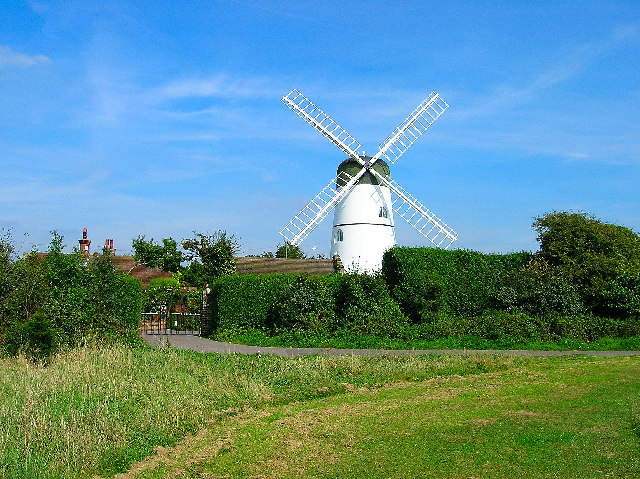
- The mill in 2005
- Interactive map of Westdene Windmill

Origin
- Mill name: Westdene Mill
- Mill location: TQ 292 086
- Coordinates: 50°51′43″N 0°09′58″W
- Operator: Private
- Year built: 1885

Information
- Purpose: Corn mill
- Type: Tower mill
- Storeys: Four storeys
- No. of sails: Four sails
- Type of sails: Spring Patent sails
- Windshaft: cast iron
- Winding: Fantail
- Fantail blades: Five blades

Waterhall Mill, also known as Westdene Windmill, is a grade II listed tower mill at Westdene, Sussex, England which has been converted to residential use.

== History ==
Waterhall Mill was built in 1885 by James Holloway, the Shoreham millwright. It was the last windmill built in Sussex, and was working until 1924. In World War II it was used by the Home Guard as a lookout post. The mill was converted into a house in 1963, retaining the machinery, with the exterior being restored. New sweeps (Sussex dialect for sails) were erected in 1972. The cap was partly rebuilt and new sweeps erected following a lightning strike in December 1990.

== Description ==
Waterhall Mill is a four-storey brick tower mill with a domed cap winded by a five-bladed fantail. It had four Spring Patent sails carried on a cast iron Windshaft. The iron Brake Wheel is fitted with Holloway's screw brake. The mill drove three pairs of underdrift millstones.

The tower is 19 feet (5.79 m) in diameter at the base and 13 feet (3.96 m) in diameter at the curb, having an overall height of 40 feet (12.19 m) to the curb.

== Millers ==
- Joseph Harris 1885 - 1903
- Bull - 1924
