= Withdean =

Former village in East Sussex, England

Coordinates: 50°51′02″N 00°09′07″W

- Population: 14,452 (2011.Ward)
- Unitary authority: Brighton and Hove
- Ceremonial county: East Sussex
- Region: South East
- Country: England
- Sovereign state: United Kingdom
- Post town: BRIGHTON
- Postcode district: BN1
- Dialling code: 01273
- Police: Sussex
- Fire: East Sussex
- Ambulance: South East Coast
- UK Parliament: Brighton, Pavilion

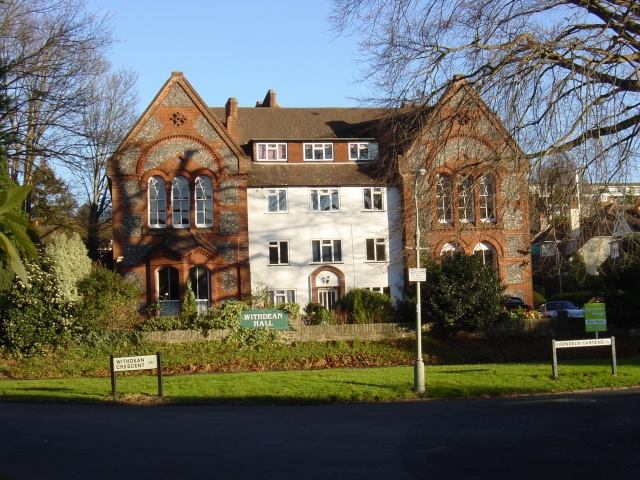
Withdean Hall

Withdean is a former village, now part of Brighton and Hove, East Sussex.

== Overview ==
The first known record of the area dates from around the 12th century, when it was referred to as Wictedene. The area was historically farm land but has been developed, mainly in the 1920s and 1930s, with a mix of detached and semi-detached houses and mid-rise flats.

The Withdean manor was originally the property of the great Cluniac Priory of St. Pancras at Lewes, until 1537. This was then given to Anne of Cleves in 1541 by Henry VIII. The manor was demolished in 1936.

This is where Withdean Stadium is located, which was the temporary home of Brighton and Hove Albion F.C. between 1999 and 2011. The stadium site was formerly Brighton Zoo built in 1920.

Withdean Woods, next to the stadium, is a wooded hillside nature reserve approximately 2.47 acres (1 ha) in size. This is the home of several woodland birds including the great spotted woodpecker, tawny owl and goldcrest.

Withdean Park is also located in this area, and is home to the national collection of lilacs with over 320 varieties. Collections of berberis, cotoneaster and viburnum can also be found here.

Withdean is referenced in the chapter "The Wiseman of Withdean" of the fantasy novel The Brightonomicon.
