= Grade II listed buildings in Brighton and Hove: C–D =

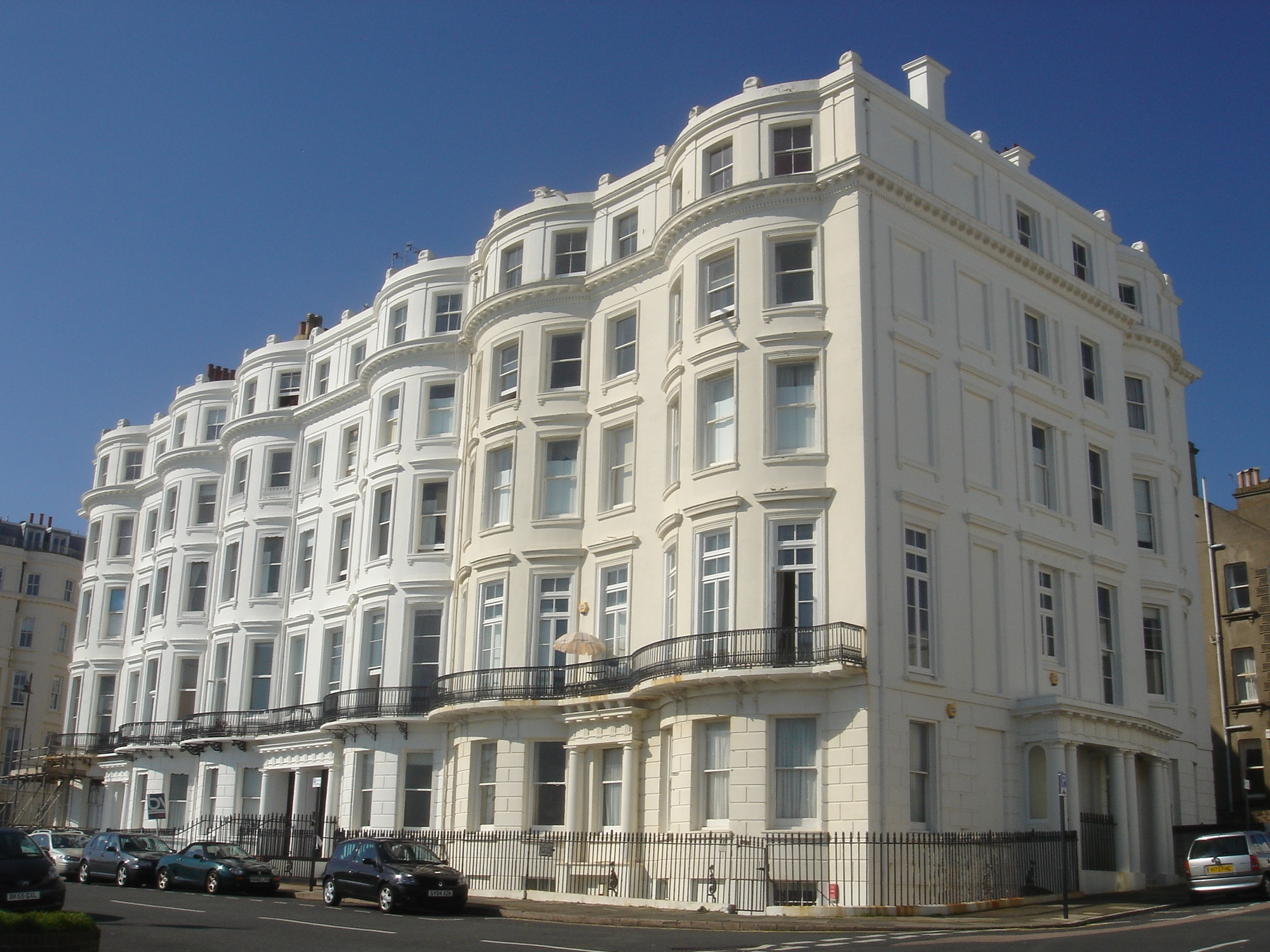
Clarendon Terrace—an outlying part of the Kemp Town development—was built between 1855 and 1859, about 30 years after the main crescents and squares.

As of February 2001, there were 1,124 listed buildings with Grade II status in the English city of Brighton and Hove. The total at 2009 was similar. The city, on the English Channel coast approximately 52 miles (84 km) south of London, was formed as a unitary authority in 1997 by the merger of the neighbouring towns of Brighton and Hove. Queen Elizabeth II granted city status in 2000.

In England, a building or structure is defined as "listed" when it is placed on a statutory register of buildings of "special architectural or historic interest" by the Secretary of State for Culture, Media and Sport, a Government department, in accordance with the Planning (Listed Buildings and Conservation Areas) Act 1990. English Heritage, a non-departmental public body, acts as an agency of this department to administer the process and advise the department on relevant issues. There are three grades of listing status. The Grade II designation is the lowest, and is used for "nationally important buildings of special interest". Grade II* is used for "particularly important buildings of more than special interest"; there are 69 such buildings in the city. There are also 24 Grade I listed buildings (defined as being of "exceptional interest" and greater than national importance, and the highest of the three grades) in Brighton and Hove.

This list summarises 118 Grade II-listed buildings and structures whose names begin with C or D. Numbered buildings with no individual name are listed by the name of the street they stand on. Some listings include contributory fixtures such as surrounding walls or railings in front of the building. These are summarised by notes alongside the building name.

== Listed buildings ==
Contributory fixtures
Note	Listing includes
^{[A]}	Attached railings
^{[B]}	Attached walls
^{[C]}	Attached walls and piers
^{[D]}	Attached walls and railings
^{[E]}	Attached walls, piers and railings
^{[F]}	Iron sign and chain

Building name	Area	Image	Notes	Refs
8–19 Camelford Street	Kemptown; 50.8203°N 0.1330°W		These "entirely unselfconscious 18th-century cottages" are mostly of painted brick, although three are stuccoed. Each has a single-window range; the windows are bays. Most houses have a dormer window in the attic space above the top floor.	
22 Camelford Street	Kemptown; 50.8205°N 0.1328°W		Like its neighbours, this was built in the late 18th century. It is of brick with sash windows topped with brick lintels. There is also a casement-style dormer window above a dentil-pattern cornice of brick.	
33–35 Camelford Street	Kemptown; 50.8199°N 0.1329°W		Originally lodging houses, these are some of the earliest surviving buildings east of Old Steine. Numbers 33 and 35 are stuccoed; the middle house has flint walls with some stucco. Number 35 has an arched entrance set below an architrave, while the other two houses have doors set next to each other under flat canopies. Each house has dormer windows in the attic.	
36 Camelford Street	Kemptown; 50.8198°N 0.1330°W		Formerly Eastern Lodge, this early-19th-century cottage, of three storeys and with a tiled gambrel roof, was radical social reformer George Holyoake's home for more than 25 years. The arched entrance has an architrave and carved keystone. The original sashes in the bay windows have been replaced.	
27 and 28 Cannon Place^{[A]}	Brighton; 50.8227°N 0.1478°W		Between the Grand and Metropole Hotels, and overshadowed by the Churchill Square development, this early-19th-century street "has the character of a service road". Original survivors include this four-storey bay-windowed pair of houses, with an iron balcony, pilastered entrance porch and double cornice.	
30 Cannon Place^{[A]}	Brighton; 50.8226°N 0.1478°W		Facing St Margaret's Place (to which it presents a three-window range) as well as Cannon Place, this early 1820s four-storey house is topped by a parapet and has a rusticated ground floor. The windows on the Cannon Place façade are segmental bays. The entrance is in a flat-hooded porch with a fanlight. There are also Ionic pilasters on the outer sides of the main façade.	
31 and 32 Cannon Place	Brighton; 50.8224°N 0.1479°W		These houses incorporate part of the former Royal Newburgh Assembly Rooms, a high-class social venue built by Amon Henry Wilds in 1833 for a local entrepreneur, Charles Wright, who wanted to attract high society to this part of Brighton. The main façade is to St Margaret's Place; there are bay windows, two cornices and a wide portico with antae and columns with elaborate capitals. A room at number 31 was used as a Jehovah's Witnesses Kingdom Hall between 1936 and 1938.	
1 and 1a Castle Square^{[A]}	Brighton; 50.8213°N 0.1380°W		This bow-fronted building faces Old Steine and is clad with mathematical tiles which have now been painted over. The Gothic Revival shopfront is a later addition; the building dates from about 1825 and was probably executed by Amon Wilds and Charles Busby. There is a first-floor balcony, a mansard roof behind a parapet and a series of sash windows.	
2 and 3 Castle Square	Brighton; 50.8213°N 0.1381°W		This is a symmetrical bow-fronted three-storey pair of houses of the early 19th century, now used as shops and offices. The three-window range consists of one bow window to each house and a smaller rectangular window in the recess between the bows. There is a parapet in front of the tiled roof.	
4 Castle Square^{[A]}	Brighton; 50.8214°N 0.1382°W		Castle Square has long since lost its character as a significant public space because of regular alteration since its 18th-century origins. The run of early-19th-century buildings on the south side, dominated by this five-storey structure (incorporating dormer and attic space), are the oldest survivors, but have been altered and commercialised. Attributed to the Wilds and Busby partnership, the building has two-storey Tuscan pilasters, tall sash windows, a narrow balcony and a cornice below the attic storey.	
5 Castle Square	Brighton; 50.8214°N 0.1382°W		Described as "stout and short", this three-storey house with a projecting ground-floor shopfront may be older than its neighbours—possibly late-18th-century. The stuccoed façade has two-storey pilasters topped with a simple pediment and entablature. Between them is a first-floor bay window with a small dome of metal.	
6 Castle Square	Brighton; 50.8214°N 0.1383°W		The prominent, tall mansard roof accentuates the extreme narrowness of this single-bay cottage, which is contemporary with number 4. The stuccoed building has a single bay window range above the ground-floor shopfront; the cornice above is met by two slim, full-length pilasters with panelled decoration.	
33 and 34 Castle Street	Brighton; 50.8236°N 0.1490°W		These paired houses are old survivors on this back street off Western Road: they date from about 1830. Their main feature of interest is the set of three Ionic pilasters which rise through the upper two storeys and terminate in a blocking course below an entablature which hides the tiled roof.	
Cavendish	Rottingdean; 50.8058°N 0.0588°W		This house was clad in stucco in the 19th century, hiding its earlier origins. The tiled roof has a chimney at each end of its main range; it then turns to span a west-facing range. The façade has four windows (one in the west-facing wing) on each of two storeys, all with sashes.	
1 and 2 Cavendish Place^{[A]}	Brighton; 50.8225°N 0.1528°W		Planned from 1825 as another sea-facing square next to the earlier Bedford Square, this development failed to thrive. The sea end of the western side is formed by this former hotel (now flats) with an 11-window range; five face into Cavendish Place, while six face the sea. The entrance porch has pilasters, hood-moulded windows and a panelled door with renewed glass. Corinthian-style pilasters rise through two storeys, and the sea-facing side has a first-floor balcony of cast iron.	
3 Cavendish Place^{[A]}	Brighton; 50.8227°N 0.1528°W		This mid-terrace house rises to five storeys and dates from the early to mid-19th century, making it contemporary with the rest of Cavendish Place. There are five windows per storey: two in a flat-fronted bay to the left (south), and three in a canted bay which runs the full height of the house. Rustication and iron window-guards are in place at ground-floor level. An iron balcony sits above this. Some windows have pediments, cornices or keystones.	
4 Cavendish Place^{[A]}	Brighton; 50.8228°N 0.1527°W		Smaller than its neighbour, rising to four storeys with three windows each, this house has an elaborate entrance consisting of a panelled door with a fanlight above, pilasters flanking the door, corbels on top of these and next to the fanlight, and a cornice. Except the top storey, all floors have a left-oriented canted bay window.	
5–7 Cavendish Place^{[A]}	Brighton; 50.8229°N 0.1527°W		Numbers 5 and 6 used to be a hotel, but they are now in residential use again. All three houses are of four storeys. Numbers 5 and 6 have large bay windows at ground- and first-floor level; the first-floor window at number 6 is set to the right. Corinthian-style pilasters with large decorative capitals span the middle two storeys; above these there is an entablature and a cornice.	
10–13 Cavendish Place^{[A]}	Brighton; 50.8228°N 0.1523°W		Poet Horace Smith lived at number 12, as indicated by a blue plaque. The terrace dates from the late 1820s and rises to four storeys. All houses are stuccoed and rusticated to the ground floor. Bay windows predominate, and the first- and second-floor windows are flanked by Corinthian pilasters in common with some of the houses opposite. An iron balcony runs across the four houses at first-floor level.	
14 Cavendish Place	Brighton; 50.8227°N 0.1524°W		Only the northern part of the east side of Cavendish Place survives; the side of the 1960s Bedford Hotel takes up space previously occupied by several houses. This end-of-terrace house dates from about 1829 and rises to four storeys. A parapet hides the roof. Many features are similar to those of other houses in Cavendish Place: ground-floor rustication, canted bay windows, an iron balcony and two-storey pilasters of the Corinthian order.	
Challoners and Little Challoners	Rottingdean; 50.8082°N 0.0582°W		Only the cellars of the original 15th-century manor house, given to the Challoner family in 1456, remain. Most of the present building, with its smugglers' tunnels leading to the beach, dates from the late 16th century, but the façade is two centuries newer. The flint and brick building has a roof of Horsham stone. The adjacent Little Challoners dates from 1804.	
Chapel at Brighton and Preston Cemetery	Race Hill; 50.8338°N 0.1158°W		The 30-acre (12 ha) cemetery is part of a 100-acre (40 ha) complex of burial grounds between Race Hill, Lewes Road and Bevendean. The mortuary chapel was built of knapped flint in about 1900, and has a square tower with small lancet windows and an octagonal spire. Red-brick courses and quoins contrast with the pale flint. The entrance, in the base of the tower, has a pointed arch. The two-bay nave has an ogee-arched three-light lancet window in the east wall.	
Chapel at Brighton Extramural Cemetery	Race Hill; 50.8370°N 0.1204°W		Amon Henry Wilds's only Gothic building was the Anglican chapel at this 13-acre (5.3 ha) former private burial ground. The knapped flint building, of the early 19th century, has a wooden turret-style spire, original stained glass, a timber-framed roof with wooden bosses, curved tracery in some of the lancet windows, and a tall stone porte-cochère attached to the west end.	
Chapel at Ian Fraser House (St Dunstan's)	Ovingdean; 50.8080°N 0.0690°W		Ian Fraser House is the home of the St Dunstan's charity for blind members of the British Armed Forces. A chapel was added at the front of the building in 1935–38 by the Burnet Tait & Lorne design partnership. It is a Modernist building (especially the interior) of brick and stone, and has a chancel lit from above, a nave and two porches.	
Chapel at Jewish Cemetery	Round Hill; 50.8389°N 0.1326°W		Thomas Read Kemp donated land off the Ditchling Road to Brighton's Jewish community in 1826. They established a cemetery there, and commissioned Thomas Lainson to build an octagonal brick chapel in 1893. It has a tiled roof, a pedimented entrance and corbelled brick piers at each corner, and is reminiscent of the Queen Anne style. The chapel and cemetery are now closed and derelict.	
9–12 Charles Street	Brighton; 50.8205°N 0.1351°W		These are some of the oldest cottages on the East Cliff, running eastwards from Old Steine and the Royal Pavilion along the coast towards Rottingdean. Their bow windows—unusually tall and narrow—are also some of the earliest in the area. Dating from very early in the 19th century, the three-storey terraced houses each have a dormer window in their gambrel roofs. Painted stucco and brickwork predominates, but mathematical tiles are visible around the windows of number 11. The doorcases consist of a Tuscan porch with a modillion and cornice supported on decorative corbels. The windows are sashes.	
20–23 Charles Street^{[A]}	Brighton; 50.8206°N 0.1353°W		This terrace of four houses, built in the early 19th century, are faced with mathematical tiles which have been painted over. They each rise to three storeys with a dormer window at the top, and have a single canted bay window on each floor. The porches are similar to those at numbers 9–12 Charles Street, although they lack the modillion below the cornice. Number 23 has been subject to several alterations, including the insertion of a much wider bay window on the ground floor.	
7 Charlotte Street^{[A]}	Kemptown; 50.8192°N 0.1278°W		This mid-terrace house of the early 19th century rises to four storeys, of which the uppermost is an attic. An entablature and parapet separate this part from the rest of the building. The exterior is stuccoed. The doorcase has Tuscan pilasters. Each storey has a bay window and a smaller flat window, and a cast-iron balcony runs across at first-floor level.	
16 and 17 Charlotte Street^{[A]}	Kemptown; 50.8193°N 0.1281°W		This symmetrical pair of terraced houses were built early in the 19th century. Their entrance porches area aligned as a pair and are flanked by Tuscan pilasters supporting a flat entablature. Each house has four storeys, with rustication to the ground floor, cast-iron balconies supported on brackets above this, a three-window range in which the centre window on the two upper storeys is blind, and broad bays extending all the way up the façade. The centre windows on the first and second floors are topped by shallow pediments.	
18–24 Charlotte Street^{[A]}	Kemptown; 50.8192°N 0.1281°W		These are a run of seven terraced houses of the same date as their neighbours at numbers 16 and 17. Stucco is the main building material, but there are some painted mathematical tiles to numbers 23 and 24. The doorways are elevated above street level and have semicircular arches with fanlights. Each house has a two-window range with three-part windows set into full-height, full-width bays. Variations include blind windows above the doors at numbers 18 to 22, and sashes at numbers 23 and 24. All houses also have balconies at first-floor level.	
Chattri	Patcham; 50.8841°N 0.1470°W		This war memorial commemorates Indian soldiers who fought for the British Empire in World War I. Erected on the remote downland site of the ghat on which their bodies were cremated, it was designed by Indian architect E.C. Henriques with guidance from Samuel Swinton Jacob. Work took place in 1920–21 and the Prince of Wales unveiled the structure on 1 February 1921. The stone, granite and white Sicilian marble pavilion is topped with a dome carried on eight columns.	
1–6 Chesham Place^{[A]}	Kemp Town; 50.8168°N 0.1157°W		The southwestern part of this street dates from about 1855, well after the Regency period, but that era's architectural style was carried on—making the terrace harmonise with the surrounding buildings of Kemp Town. Many alterations have been made, but the original plan of each house was four storeys, a full-height bay front, Tuscan-style doorcase, three flat-headed windows to each floor and an entablature and cornice.	
7–11 Chesham Place^{[E]}	Kemp Town; 50.8172°N 0.1156°W		The other part of the western side of Chesham Place, also built in the 1850s, maintains the early-19th-century Regency-style traditions of the rest of the Kemp Town estate, which surrounds it. The houses are stuccoed and have three storeys and an attic floor. Each floor has canted bay windows. The side walls have full-height quoins.	
12–21 Chesham Place^{[E]}	Kemp Town; 50.8170°N 0.1152°W		The ten houses in this terrace, now all converted to flats, share the same overall design. Each has three storeys and attic space, a three-window range formed by a canted bay rising from ground level to the roofline, and an elaborate arrangement on the centre window of the second floor: Tuscan-style pilasters and entablatures form an aedicule-like recess in which the window sits. The entablature in turn supports a cornice which separates the attic from the main elevation. The attic windows are round-arched. The entrances are also set in a Tuscan-columned aedicule.	
23–29 Chichester Place^{[A]}	Kemp Town; 50.8176°N 0.1147°W		Thomas Cubitt built these four houses in about 1845 on land given to him by Thomas Read Kemp in lieu of payment for the work he undertook on the Kemp Town estate. They are treated as two pairs and have different designs, although the cornice is continuous across the whole terrace. Numbers 23 and 25 have three storeys with three windows each and a large segmental bay front. Their doors are set in Tuscan-pilastered porches. There are cast iron balconies to the first floor. Numbers 27 and 29 have a two-window range.	
4, 4a and 5 Church Hill	Patcham; 50.8649°N 0.1519°W		Dating back to the 16th century, but with 19th-century flint walls with some red brickwork, these small terraced cottages open straight on to the road. The three houses share a five-window range and have two storeys each. Number 4's entrance is in a side porch with a hipped roof. The houses are timber-framed and have queen post roofs.	
10 Church Hill	Patcham; 50.8654°N 0.1515°W		This 18th-century house was extended in the late 20th century, but is timber-framed with flint walls and some red brickwork to the quoins and dressings. There is a hipped slate roof with two original chimneys.	
13–21 Church Hill	Patcham; 50.8664°N 0.1516°W		The cottages on Church Hill, including this terrace, were proposed for demolition in the 1960s, but a local preservation society saved and restored them. These buildings are early-19th-century and have a single-window range with stuccoed walls and slate roofs. Some original sash windows survive.	
22 and 22a Church Hill	Patcham; 50.8662°N 0.1515°W		These are physically separate from the adjacent terrace at 13–21 Church Hill, but are contemporary with those houses and have been listed because of their group value (the way in which their appearance "contributes to the interest" of nearby buildings). They are slate-roofed stuccoed cottages with two storeys and entrances with straight hood moulds.	
23 and 24 Church Hill	Patcham; 50.8660°N 0.1515°W		The main materials of these terraced cottages are flint and brick, but one end is timber-framed and studded. Most windows are sashes. A two-storey bay has been added to the south side of number 24, also in flint and brick and with an arched entrance.	
28 and 29 Church Hill	Patcham; 50.8659°N 0.1516°W		Four old timber-framed flint-faced cottages have been converted into two to form this listed building. The flintwork was added in the 18th century. Both houses have a two-window range; the upper windows are dormers.	
33–36 Church Hill	Patcham; 50.8656°N 0.1517°W		These four early-19th-century two-storey terraced cottages have been altered but retain their original brick-dressed flint walls. All doors and windows are arched with segmental heads, except the first-floor windows which are straight-headed. The roof has several large chimneys.	
Church of the Annunciation	Hanover; 50.8294°N 0.1296°W		This is the parish church of the Hanover neighbourhood, whose densely packed streets of terraced housing climb the surrounding hillside. It was briefly administered from St Paul's Church upon its completion in 1864 by local architect William Dancy. Edmund Scott extended the building in the 1880s. The Early English-style church has lancet windows, flint and brick walls, wooden columned aisles and a spire-topped tower, added in 1892.	
Church of the Annunciation: Vicarage	Hanover; 50.8296°N 0.1294°W		The vicarage was added next to the church in a complementary style in 1897, in memory of the second vicar of the parish. The flint building, with thin brick dressings and a string-course, has dormer windows in its tiled roof. The three-window range consists of two small pointed-arched windows flanking larger, slightly recessed windows with a tiled spandrel and a gable.	
Church of the Good Shepherd	Prestonville; 50.8417°N 0.1580°W		Edward Prioleau Warren's simplified Gothic Revival brown-brick church was built on Dyke Road on the Brighton/Hove border in the 1920s to serve the northern part of Prestonville. It was erected in the memory of a former Vicar of Preston, and was originally in that parish. Work took place in 1921–22 and 1927. Most windows are lancets, and there is a battlemented tower.	
Church of the Sacred Heart	Hove; 50.8298°N 0.1709°W		In the 1870s, the priest of St Mary Magdalen's Church in Brighton endowed a mission church for Hove, which had no Roman Catholic place of worship. Architect John Crawley's Early English design, in limestone with internal brickwork, was executed in 1880–81. Extensions in 1887 and 1914–15 completed the building. Eric Gill, a convert, was received into the Church here.	
94–108 Church Road	Hove; 50.8276°N 0.1715°W		This terrace of shops with pale gault-brick flats and offices above are "an integral and important part" of this late-19th-century area's character. The shopfront at 102–104, in the form of a wooden surround and pediment with carvings, is original. A parapet hides a single mansard roof spanning the whole terrace. The endmost bays have four storeys; the others have three.	
105–119 Church Road	Hove; 50.8280°N 0.1718°W		This terrace, on the north side of Church Road, is similar to numbers 94–108 opposite. Also built in the 1870s of yellow gault brick with stone dressings (including quoins with vermiculated rustication—a random pattern of curved lines) and a mansard roof, the pattern of taller tower-style end bays is again followed. The shopfronts are all modern replacements.	
2 Church Street	North Laine; 50.8241°N 0.1393°W		This building also faces New Road, and the listing includes number 24 New Road. Like many buildings in Brighton before the advent of Regency architecture, this house (dating from 1807) has tarred cobblestone walls with some painted brickwork. Sloping land gives it both four- and three-storey elevations, each of which has a three-window range. The Church Street entrance is elaborate: Doric columns with a mutule leads to an arched doorway with a fanlight. There is another arched entrance next to it. A canted shopfront was added on the New Road façade in the 19th century. Many windows are sashes.	
3a, 3b and 3c Church Street	North Laine; 50.8241°N 0.1396°W		These houses now have shop units at ground-floor level. They are no later than mid-19th century, and are in the pre-Regency vernacular style of painted cobblestones with painted brick dressings. The building has five windows to both storeys. All doorways and ground-floor windows are flat-arched. A slate roof sits behind a parapet.	
5 Church Street	North Laine; 50.8242°N 0.1398°W		This listing incorporates numbers 18a, 19 and 20 Bond Street, which adjoin as part of a terrace. The buildings rise to three or four storeys and have hipped roofs with tiles. The walls, of brick and stucco, are hidden under paintwork. The single-window range to Church Street has an original (early-19th-century) sash window on the first floor. The ground floor has shop units, one of which (at number 18a) was placed beneath an original carriage arch which retains a keystone with vermiculated rustication.	
6–8 Church Street	North Laine; 50.8243°N 0.1402°W		This two-storey terrace of shops with painted-brick flats above was built no later than the early 19th century. Each has a single window at first-floor level and a dormer in the tiled mansard roof. Number 7's original 19th-century shopfront, with a cornice and pilasters, remains in part. Numbers 6 and 7 have sash windows.	
Clarence House^{[A]}	Brighton; 50.8228°N 0.1408°W		North Street, which developed in the mid-18th century, became a major commercial area with inns and hotels on both sides. This is the only original hotel to survive; it is now used as offices and shops (the Neo-Georgian shopfront dates from the 1990s). Opened in 1785 as the New Inn, it was considered "the best inn in Brighton" by the 1800s. It finally closed in the 1970s. The simple four-storey eight-window exterior of painted mathematical tiles has a Tuscan porch with a balcony on top.	
Clarendon Lodge^{[C]}	Kemptown; 50.8199°N 0.1244°W		This early- or mid-19th-century house between St George's and Eastern Roads presents a two-window range (one of which is blank) to Clarendon Place and a five-window main façade. The straight-headed entrance, offset to the left in the main frontage, has a Tuscan porch with cornice and entablature. This is flanked by canted bay windows which also have Tuscan-style pilasters. There are some original sash windows.	
Clarendon Mansions	Brighton; 50.8196°N 0.1389°W		East Street was an important commercial area throughout the 19th century, and this building was erected as a hotel in 1869 next to the popular Brill's Baths—Brighton's first communal bathing establishment. The four-storey structure curves round to face the sea on Grand Junction Road: its façade has a 14-window range. The main entrance is balustraded and pilastered, and there are subsidiary entrances at intervals. The tiled mansard roof has dormer windows with gables. The building is now in residential use.	
1–6 Clarendon Terrace^{[E]}	Kemptown; 50.8165°N 0.1152°W		Recent research indicates that this four-storey, three- and four-windowed terrace was built in the late 1850s, rather than the early 1850s as sometimes described. George Cheeseman junior may have designed them. Classical features include Doric columns, triglyphs with metopes, aediculae (with modern windows inserted) and dentil cornices. The houses, now converted into flats, are stuccoed with ground-floor rustication.	
1 and 2 Clifton Hill^{[C]}	Montpelier; 50.8287°N 0.1493°W		This semi-detached "Italian-style villa" dates from about 1850 and is slate-roofed and stucco-clad. At the sides are two recessed entrance wings, a storey taller than the rest of the house and thereby forming towers. These, and the main part of the building, have quoins. The 19th-century studded doors are set beneath straight-headed porches. The main fa?çade has five windows, the middle of which is blocked and shared by the two houses. A cornice with brackets, canted bay windows to the ground floor, and cast-iron balconies and railings also characterise the building.	
7 Clifton Hill^{[C]}	Montpelier; 50.8289°N 0.1484°W		Clifton Hill's development was slow and inconsistent. This house (originally Clifton Villa) is similar to numbers 1 and 2 (other than lacking the tower-style entrance wings), but dates from 1845. The slate roof is hipped. It has façades to Clifton Hill, with a three-window range, and Clifton Road (with a single window to each of two storeys). The corner has chamfered quoins. The entrance door is arched and has a pediment above, supported on pilasters. Some windows are canted bays topped with canopies; all have sashes.	
10 and 11 Clifton Hill^{[B]}	Montpelier; 50.8281°N 0.1481°W		This three-storey semi-detached villa of 1847 has a tall tent-canopied balcony across the whole façade. The houses share a two-window range and have canted bay windows at first-floor level. The hipped roof has a single chimney-stack. At ground floor level, the stucco walls are rusticated.	
24 and 25 Clifton Hill	Montpelier; 50.8278°N 0.1480°W		Built in the 1840s, these stucco-walled, partly rusticated houses have two storeys, two windows and a mansard roof with dormers and side chimneys. The doorway has an original panelled door and is surrounded by an entablature and pilasters. Most windows are bays with 19th-century sashes, but one is blind.	
Clifton Hill Coach House	Montpelier; 50.8274°N 0.1469°W		Although it stands on Clifton Hill, this 1852 coach house was part of 5 Powis Villas. It is elaborate, with Coade stone dressings, stucco, brick-dressed flint, a slate roof and some pilasters: part of the structure could be seen from the house. In the 1930s it became a garage and workshop, then the adjacent Royal Alexandra Hospital used it for storage. English Heritage describes it as a "substantially intact and rare survival" with "polite architectural and sculptural features".	
1–4 Clifton Road^{[C]}	Montpelier; 50.8284°N 0.1482°W		This short terrace of three-storey stucco-fronted houses are mid-1840s according to recent research. Each has a single window to each storey; roofs vary between tiled and slate-covered. Features common to all four include a straight-headed recessed door under a similarly flat-headed porch, bay windows on the two lower floors, with a covered cast-iron verandah at first-floor level (except at number 2, which has lost its canopy), and flat rectangular sash windows at second-floor level.	
7 and 8 Clifton Road^{[D]}	Montpelier; 50.8287°N 0.1478°W		These semi-detached houses are contemporary with the terrace at 1–4 Clifton Road. The top (third) storey is recessed behind a large cornice. Entrances are at the outer sides, and are flanked by large Doric pilasters which rise to the cornice then continue above it on the top floor. The doorways themselves are straight-headed and set under a small pediment. Both houses have two-storey bay windows with canopied cast-iron verandahs at first-floor level.	
9 and 10 Clifton Road^{[B]}	Montpelier; 50.8288°N 0.1476°W		Part of a longer terrace, these houses share some architectural elements but have some differences in detail, especially around the entrances. Both have three storeys and share a hipped roof with eaves. The porch at number 9 (called Eagle Villa in 1850) is recessed and topped by a pediment with a carved eagle. Number 10's entrance is in a full-height bay, giving the house a two-window range unlike its neighbour. The ground and first floors have bay windows with cast-iron open balconies.	
26 Clifton Road	Montpelier; 50.8288°N 0.1482°W		This villa's original attribution to Wilds and Busby in the 1820s is now thought to be 20 years too early. The two-bay, four-window façade of stucco sits beneath a slate roof. A one-storey recessed fifth bay on the south side has a pilastered entrance set into a modern porch, and the north side also has a recessed bay. On the main elevation, the ground-floor windows are canopied, and those above are set between Ionic pilasters. The cornice above this is supported on brackets.	
1–23 Clifton Terrace and 18 Vine Place^{[B]}	Montpelier; 50.8265°N 0.1475°W		This wide sweep of terraced villa-style houses overlook a private garden which was the site of a windmill until 1837. The 23 houses, and number 18 Vine Place (next to 23 Clifton Terrace), were finished in 1851. The three centre houses rise to three storeys, forming an elevated centrepiece. Most houses share porches and blank windows with their neighbour; numbers 1, 14, 22 and 23 have two visible façades and single porches. The doorways are mostly straight-headed, while the porches have segmental arches. Bay windows, mostly set beneath canopies, predominate on the ground floor. Dormer windows are set into the roofs.	
25 Clifton Terrace^{[B]}	Montpelier; 50.8268°N 0.1481°W		Built later than the rest of the terrace, in about 1870, this two-storey painted brick and stucco house is double-fronted to the south and west. The arched entrance is reminiscent of the four-centred "Tudor" style. Below the roof runs a moulded cornice and parapet.	
27–31 Clifton Terrace^{[C]}	Montpelier; 50.8265°N 0.1485°W		Diagonally opposite the main part of the terrace, and contemporary with it, these five houses have three storeys and segmental-arched doorways. Numbers 28–29 and 30–31 share three-window ranges with a central blocked opening below an architrave and pediment. Some original staircases survive inside.	
32–34 Clifton Terrace^{[D]}	Montpelier; 50.8264°N 0.1486°W		This is a short terrace of mixed height, and the houses vary in width and number of windows. Numbers 32 and 33 share a segmental entrance arch with adjacent doorways. The façades have full-height canted bay windows.	
Cliveden Lodge	Withdean; 50.8491°N 0.1527°W		This was the lodge house to a now demolished mid-19th-century villa east of the main London Road; three other such lodges survive. Built in 1885, according to a plaque on its west gable, the two-storey brick and stucco building has some decorative weatherboarding and a steep roof with gables on three sides. The simple flat-headed entrance is on the south side; the gable above it is jettied. There are two elaborate brick chimneys with cornices.	
Clock Tower, North Road^{[A]}	Brighton; 50.8237°N 0.1436°W		This central Brighton landmark, erected in 1888 to commemorate Queen Victoria's Golden Jubilee, has survived numerous calls for its demolition for reasons including its danger to traffic and its lack of architectural merit. Opinion on the latter has long been polarised: negative comments include "a giant salt-cellar" and "worthless", more approving commentators have called it "supremely confident" and "extremely charming and delightful", and even ambivalent historians have strong views ("charmingly ugly"). Designed by John Johnson in a style mixing Classical, Baroque and High Victorian Gothic, it has pink granite, Portland stone, intricate scrollwork, a turreted cornice, a copper dome and an idiosyncratic time ball by local inventor Magnus Volk.	
Clock Tower, Preston Park	Preston Village; 50.8405°N 0.1448°W		Preston Park was laid out in 1883–84 on 67 acres (27 ha) of Stanford family land, and was the first (and largest) public park in Brighton. The Brighton Borough Surveyor Francis May was commissioned to design a clock tower, which was ready in 1892. The three-stage design is square–octagonal–square–octagonal in plan, mixes the Classical and the Gothic styles and a wide range of materials (stone, timber, brick and terracotta), and has been called "pompous". Local firm F. Patching and Sons built it, and a local councillor funded it.	
Clock Tower, Queen's Park	Queen's Park; 50.8245°N 0.1242°W		The newest of Brighton's three listed clock towers was added to Queen's Park in 1915. Originally called Brighton Park, the land had been a private pleasure garden between 1823 and 1892, when it was given to Brighton Corporation and redesigned for public use. A London architect, Llewellyn Williams, won the design commission; he produced a three-stage tower in rusticated Portland stone and brick, topped by a copper dome. It stands overlooking the park's lake on elevated ground (the park is in a natural valley).	
Coach House at Ovingdean Rectory	Ovingdean; 50.8159°N 0.0768°W		The adjacent rectory, completed in 1807, is Grade II*-listed. Its cobblestone-clad, brick-dressed coach house was finished in the same year. The doorways and windows are arched, and the roof is tiled and partly gabled.	
6 and 7 College Place^{[A]}	Kemptown; 50.8194°N 0.1223°W		This pair of terraced houses are separated by a wide arched carriage entrance. The early- or mid-19th-century Gothic Revival structure has a three-bay gabled façade whose centre bay contains the Tudor-arched entrance. Number 7's door is in the same style.	
Collingwood and Robertson tombs at Brighton Extramural Cemetery	Race Hill; 50.8370°N 0.1208°W		John Collingwood (1796–1861) is interred in a large Gothic Revival stone and marble tomb, resembling a dovecote or tabernacle. W. Burnett designed the square-plinthed Portland stone tomb, which has granite columns with gables and Gothic-carved spandrels. Next to it is Rev. F.W. Robertson's tomb: an Egyptian-style pylon with bronze motifs, erected in 1853. Robertson was a famous preacher at Holy Trinity Church until his death at 37. An adjacent Greek Revival tomb, commemorating an unknown burial, is included in the listing.	
Connaught Centre	Hove; 50.8295°N 0.1769°W		Designed by Thomas Simpson in 1884 as a Board School and extended with workshops by Clayton & Black in 1903, this building survived as a school until 1984, after which it became an adult education centre. Representing an "elegant", "distinctive" and early use of the Queen Anne style, it is a yellow- and red-brick building with curved gables and terracotta-coloured render.	
Corn Exchange (entrance wing)	Brighton; 50.8238°N 0.1387°W		Robert Atkinson added this wing to the Corn Exchange/Dome complex in 1934. Its grey-brick exterior is in a simplified version of William Porden's Islamic-influenced work in the early 1800s. The four-bay façade has sculptures by James Woodford.	
County Court House (former)^{[E]}	North Laine; 50.8240°N 0.1381°W		Charles Sorby designed this two-storey building in 1868 in a Tudor/Gothic derivative of the Italianate style which hitherto had been popular for courthouses. It opened in July 1869 and was used until 1967, when the council acquired it and used it for storage. It was restored as a museum lecture room in 2002. The building is of brick and Bath stone; its hipped roof is tiled.	
Courtenay Beach	Hove; 50.8247°N 0.1742°W		Courtenay Terrace—an 1840s seafront development—is now a mixture of flats and original houses, and its buildings are individually named and listed. This part has a mansard roof and rises to three storeys with pedimented dormers in the roof above. The rear (south) façade faces a garden and the beach.	
Courtenay Lodge^{[B]}	Hove; 50.8246°N 0.1741°W		This two-storey building was a hotel for a time, and was remodelled in 1899 to make a link to the adjacent Courtenayside. Features include an ogee corner dome, sash and casement windows, a continuous first-floor balustrade and a curved dormer.	
Courtenay Towers^{[B]}	Hove; 50.8247°N 0.1738°W		Originally part of a separate villa in 1875, this three- to four-storey building has been altered several times and is now part of Courtenay Terrace. The fourth storey is formed by a crenellated tower with decorative quoining, cornice and frieze. Most windows are sashes. The surrounding walls, in a "slightly Art Deco style", may date from a round of alterations in 1933.	
Courtenayside^{[B]}	Hove; 50.8247°N 0.1739°W		Along with Courtenay Towers, this building also formed part of the villa (Hove Lea) which was incorporated into the terrace in the early 20th century. Its single façade has two bays and three storeys. Full-height Ionic pilasters frame the first-floor windows; the lower storey is rusticated. A balustrade tops the parapet.	
1 and 2 Crescent Place^{[A]}	Kemptown; 50.8183°N 0.1236°W		Only the eastern side of this narrow north–south street behind the East Cliff has buildings. Numbers 1 and 2 have been attributed to Amon Wilds and Charles Busby and date from the early part of their partnership: possibly as early as the 1810s. They have distinctive verandahs at first-floor level, bay windows there and on the ground floor and a cornice below the roofline. Number 1 also has a triangular bay window on the second floor.	
11 and 12 Crescent Place^{[A]}	Kemptown; 50.8189°N 0.1234°W		These houses are slightly later than the pair at the other end of the street, and their architect is unknown. Nevertheless, they follow the three-storey, bay-windowed and balconied pattern of the latter. The balconies, at first-floor level, are not covered and are reached by French windows. The cornice below the roofline continues round number 12 and is visible on the side (north) façade.	
Cricketers^{[F]}	The Lanes; 50.8213°N 0.1414°W		The oldest pub in central Brighton has its origins in 1545, under the name Laste and Fishcart; it served the village fishermen. It was renamed in 1790 by its new landlord, a cricket fan, and the present appearance is mostly 19th-century (the interior is mostly "an exaggerated ... lavish display of Victoriana" from 1886). The first-floor bar is now "The Greene Room" and contains Graham Greene memorabilia; the author spent much time there and mentioned it in Brighton Rock. The exterior has cobbled flintwork.	
2–36 Cromwell Road^{[D]}	Hove; 50.8331°N 0.1653°W		Part of the "Willett estate" of Gault clay-brick houses erected by William Willett in the late 19th century, this set of houses includes villas and twin terraces. They form "a fine group", with their "homogeneity and good proportions", and are part of a conservation area. The buildings date from the early 1880s and have extensive mouldings, canted bay windows and hipped roofs.	
14 and 15 Crown Street	Brighton; 50.8250°N 0.1484°W		This pair of terraced houses have modern roofs, but they were built in the early 19th century. Each has two floors with a single-window range. The stuccoed exteriors have straight-headed entrances with patterned architraves and fanlights. The bay windows are sashes.	
19 Crown Street	Brighton; 50.8250°N 0.1481°W		Also dating from the early 19th century, this mid-terrace house has two storeys with a single window on each. The entrance sits between pilasters and below a patterned canopy supported on brackets. The windows are bays.	
23 Crown Street	Brighton; 50.8248°N 0.1482°W		Unlike the other listed houses in this street, which are stuccoed, this cottage is built of brick (now painted over) and mathematical tiles to the spandrels of the bay windows. The roof has been renewed. The entrance has a patterned architrave above.	
Curzon Hotel (former)^{[A]}	Brighton; 50.8231°N 0.1523°W		The sea-facing centrepiece of Cavendish Place should have been a Charles Busby-designed mansion for the Count and Countess of St Antonio, who owned the land at the time (the mid-1820s). The scheme foundered, and this building took its place in 1829. Built as Cavendish Mansions—a pair of semi-detached houses—it later became a hotel, but is now flats. An astylar Classical stuccoed building with six bays and four storeys, it has round- and flat-arched windows, a cornice and parapet.	
Dale Cottage	Rottingdean; 50.8063°N 0.0594°W		Now united as a single dwelling, this 19th-century building has a two-storey main part and two wings to the rear linked by a single-storey structure. The main building has a three-window range with a Doric-columned porch and original panelled door; the window above it is an original hood-moulded sash. The rear wings are partly flint-built; one has some stained glass.	
10 and 11 Devonshire Place^{[A]}	Kemptown; 50.8211°N 0.1314°W		Amon Wilds and Charles Busby are believed to have designed these houses during their long partnership. The buildings date from the 1820s and have tiled roofs and three-storey stuccoed façades and prominent bay windows. The entrances are set in arched doorcases; that at number 10 also has a bracketed porch. Both houses have balconies of differing design at first-floor level. Most windows are sashes.	
16–18 Devonshire Place^{[A]}	Kemptown; 50.8215°N 0.1313°W		These three houses are contemporary with number 36 and were probably also designed by the Wilds–Busby partnership. Number 16 has a full-height bay window to the first and second floors, flanked by Ionic-style fluted pilasters—the same motif as at number 36. It lacks a balcony, unlike number 17—which also has a left-oriented full-height bay window. The ground-floor stucco of numbers 16 and 17 has a rusticated pattern.	
36 Devonshire Place^{[A]}	Kemptown; 50.8215°N 0.1309°W		Amon Wilds and Charles Busby were probably responsible for this mid-1820s house, which is distinguished by fluted pilasters of the Ionic order flanking the right-oriented full-height bay window. Running between the bases of the pilasters is a curved cast-iron balcony. The entrance, to the left, is straight-headed and sits below a small cornice; the two flat-arched windows above have similar cornices supported on brackets.	
37 and 37a Devonshire Place^{[A]}	Kemptown; 50.8214°N 0.1310°W		Originally part of the Brighton Regency Synagogue, which occupied numbers 37 to 39 inclusive, this is now a separate building and is accordingly listed separately. The building dates from about 1825 in its original form; it was rebuilt in 1837 by David Mocatta in connection with the founding of the synagogue, and was comprehensively restored during its conversion into flats in the late 20th century. The three-storey building has a stuccoed façade with some rustication. Each storey has three windows, all of which are sashes.	
40, 41 and 41b Devonshire Place^{[A]}	Kemptown; 50.8212°N 0.1311°W		Attributed to Wilds and Busby and dated to the mid-1820s, these houses have large bay windows, doorcases with Tuscan pilasters and capitals in the form of a Star of David, and two-storey pilasters beside the windows. Each is of three storeys with a two-window range.	
42 and 43 Devonshire Place^{[A]}	Kemptown; 50.8211°N 0.1311°W		Very wide bay windows characterise these three-bay terraced houses of the early 19th century. The ground floor is rusticated and separated from the two storeys above by a cornice. A bracketed cast-iron balcony spans the first floor.	
3 Ditchling Road	Round Hill; 50.8298°N 0.1348°W		Originally called Laburnum Cottage, this small cottage dates from the mid-1810s and has stylistic similarities to early Amon Wilds buildings—in particular the louvres on the second-floor windows. The three-storey house is stuccoed and has bay windows and a verandah.	
5–13 Ditchling Road^{[A]}	Round Hill; 50.8299°N 0.1348°W		Once called Adelphi Terrace, these five houses are a single composition united under a pedimented gable. The three-storey houses have a cast-iron balcony (partly covered) at first-floor level and prominent bay windows.	
Doctor Brighton's Inn	Brighton; 50.8201°N 0.1401°W		This seafront building has 18th-century origins: it was a hotel (The Star and Garter) for many years, and its present name-originally a 19th-century nickname-subsequently became official as it became an inn. Many of Brighton's famous visitors have stayed in the three-storey building, and it was the site of a confrontation between fishermen and the town's more recent residents in 1827 when a capstan outside had to be removed for the construction of Grand Junction Road. The entrance is in a Tuscan-columned porch with a carved date-stone reading "1750". There is a four-window range with some sashes.	
Dolphin Cottage	Brighton; 50.8201°N 0.1395°W		Called "an unusual early survivor in this part of town", this tiny building is reached down a narrow twitten between East Street and King's Road. It was originally two cottages, possibly part of a now demolished terrace of fishermen's houses. Parts of the building are 18th-century, but there has been alteration in the 19th and 20th centuries. The walls have cobblestones and brickwork.	
1 Dorset Gardens^{[A]}	Carlton Hill; 50.8223°N 0.1332°W		This double-fronted corner house may have been built (in 1801–04) around the core of an 18th-century building. The three-storey building has a cobble-fronted and stuccoed façade, a pilaster-flanked entrance, straight-headed windows (one of which, at second-floor level, is blank) and dormers in the roof.	
7 Dorset Gardens^{[A]}	Carlton Hill; 50.8220°N 0.1333°W		This was built in about 1790, and still has its original frontage—unlike most of its contemporary neighbours. The façade consists of flint cobblestones with some brickwork to the quoins. The roof, behind a brick parapet, has a single dormer window. The three storeys have two windows each; most are original sashes and all have brick surrounds.	
12–18 Dorset Gardens^{[A]}	Carlton Hill; 50.8217°N 0.1335°W		The façades of these seven 1790s houses are stuccoed, except for number 15 which (like nearby number 7) has kept its 18th-century flint cobblestones. Number 17 additionally has quoins of painted brick. Number 16 is wider than its neighbours: it has a two-window range rather than a single window to each of its three storeys. The doorways have pilasters, some in the Tuscan style with bracketed porches. Two houses have canted bay windows next to their entrances; that at number 16 is topped by a balcony.	
Dovecot at Hangleton Manor Inn	Hangleton; 50.8477°N 0.2050°W		Viscountess Wolseley, writing in 1925, said that "if only to see this ancient pigeon-cote, Hangleton [Manor] would repay a visit". The 17th-century structure, which is allegedly haunted by ghost birds, fell into dereliction but was restored in the 1980s. It has flints laid in courses, cementwork and a clay roof. The potence, a swinging ladder, has been restored.	
Dovecot at Patcham Court Farmhouse	Patcham; 50.8671°N 0.1515°W		This 17th-century flint-walled structure on the ancient Patcham Court Farm is the city's only Scheduled Ancient Monument. It has a 550-bird capacity, retains its original potence (pivoted ladder) and is circular in shape with buttresses and a cone-shaped roof of tiles. The city council have called it "an unusual survival [which] adds considerable interest and character to the area".	
Downs Junior School	Round Hill; 50.8392°N 0.1345°W		Thomas Simpson designed this board school in 1890, with a two-storey section for junior pupils and a single-storey range for infants. The building has much decorative brickwork, terracotta and tiles, and is mostly of brown brick. Many original features survive.	
Drinking fountain at Old London Road	Patcham; 50.8595°N 0.1519°W		This was erected in 1897 as a memorial (as indicated by the inscription in memoriam on the frieze, although no name is given). The granite structure has a central fountain and basin, troughs to the sides for the use of dogs and horses, and a pediment at the top.	
Drinking fountain at Queen's Park	Queen's Park; 50.8252°N 0.1250°W		Francis May added this "curiously medieval" feature during his landscaping of the park in 1892–93 ready for its opening to the public. The terracotta, granite, sandstone and red-brick structure is square with four dome-topped octagonal towers at the corners and a larger central dome, all slightly reminiscent of onion domes. Architectural historians have seen elements of the Tudor and Renaissance styles in the structure.	
Druids Head Inn	The Lanes; 50.8218°N 0.1402°W		More than 100 pubs opened in Brighton in the two years after the Beerhouse Act 1830 was passed; this brick and flint building on Brighton Place (originally a house, and built in the late 18th century) is one of only two survivors, along with Regency Tavern. The flint façade would have been common at the time but is now rare in The Lanes. The tiled roof has dormer windows. A 16th-century house may have occupied the site.	
Duke of York's Picture House	Round Hill; 50.8339°N 0.1384°W		The Clayton & Black firm designed this cinema, which opened in 1910, at a cost of £3,000. It is England's oldest working cinema and was one of the first in the world. Restoration in 1994 returned the building to its original condition. The roof is adorned with a giant pair of high-kicking female legs, taken from a cinema in Oxford.	
12 and 13 Duke Street	The Lanes; 50.8242°N 0.1451°W		These early-19th-century houses are distinguished from their contemporary neighbours by the use of red mathematical tiles. Each has a single narrow bow window rising through the upper two storeys. Shopfronts were inserted in the late 19th century. The buildings share a central chimney-stack.	
37a Duke Street	The Lanes; 50.8230°N 0.1426°W		This "remarkable" house, hidden from the street and perpendicular to it, is the oldest building on Duke Street, and has a very rare wooden façade. The blocks of wood were laid and painted to look like stone. The two-storey house, built in the 1780s, has two storeys and a dormer window in the tiled roof. The arched entrance is set to the left in a bay which is linked to the house by a curved parapet.	
Durrants, Flints and The Cot	Ovingdean; 50.8181°N 0.0756°W		These late-18th-century buildings were part of a farm complex and have been altered several times. They have flint and stucco façades, tiled roofs, dormer windows and several chimneys built of different materials. Most windows are segmental-headed.	
11 Dyke Road	Brighton; 50.8242°N 0.1451°W		This "freely inventive" and distinctive building opposite Wykeham Terrace was built as a school for poor girls on behalf of Dr Swan Downer, a merchant, who left money to found new schools and to clothe destitute adults. The foundation stone was laid in 1867, and George Somers Leigh Clarke's brown brick and stone building was used for education until the late 1930s. Since the 1960s it has housed nightclubs under many different names, and in 2014 it became the Rialto Theatre. The French/Flemish Gothic Revival building has a steep roof, a prominent oriel window, an ogee-headed entrance with an ornately carved tympanum, gargoyles, a crow-stepped gable and intricate tracery.	
128 and 130 Dyke Road	Seven Dials; 50.8319°N 0.1480°W		The use of the Regency style for this semi-detached villa is unusual for such a late date (early 1860s). Inventor Magnus Volk lived at number 128 for the last 23 years of his life; a blue plaque commemorates this. His former house has three windows to each floor, a porch with Corinthian-style pilasters and an arch, and an extra hipped-roofed wing at the rear. Number 130 has flat-arched entrance but is otherwise similar.	
The Dyke Tavern (former)	Prestonville; 50.8386°N 0.1550°W			

== See also ==
- Buildings and architecture of Brighton and Hove
- Grade I listed buildings in Brighton and Hove
- Grade II* listed buildings in Brighton and Hove
- List of conservation areas in Brighton and Hove
