= Church of the Good Shepherd, Brighton =

Church in Brighton and Hove, England

Church of the Good Shepherd
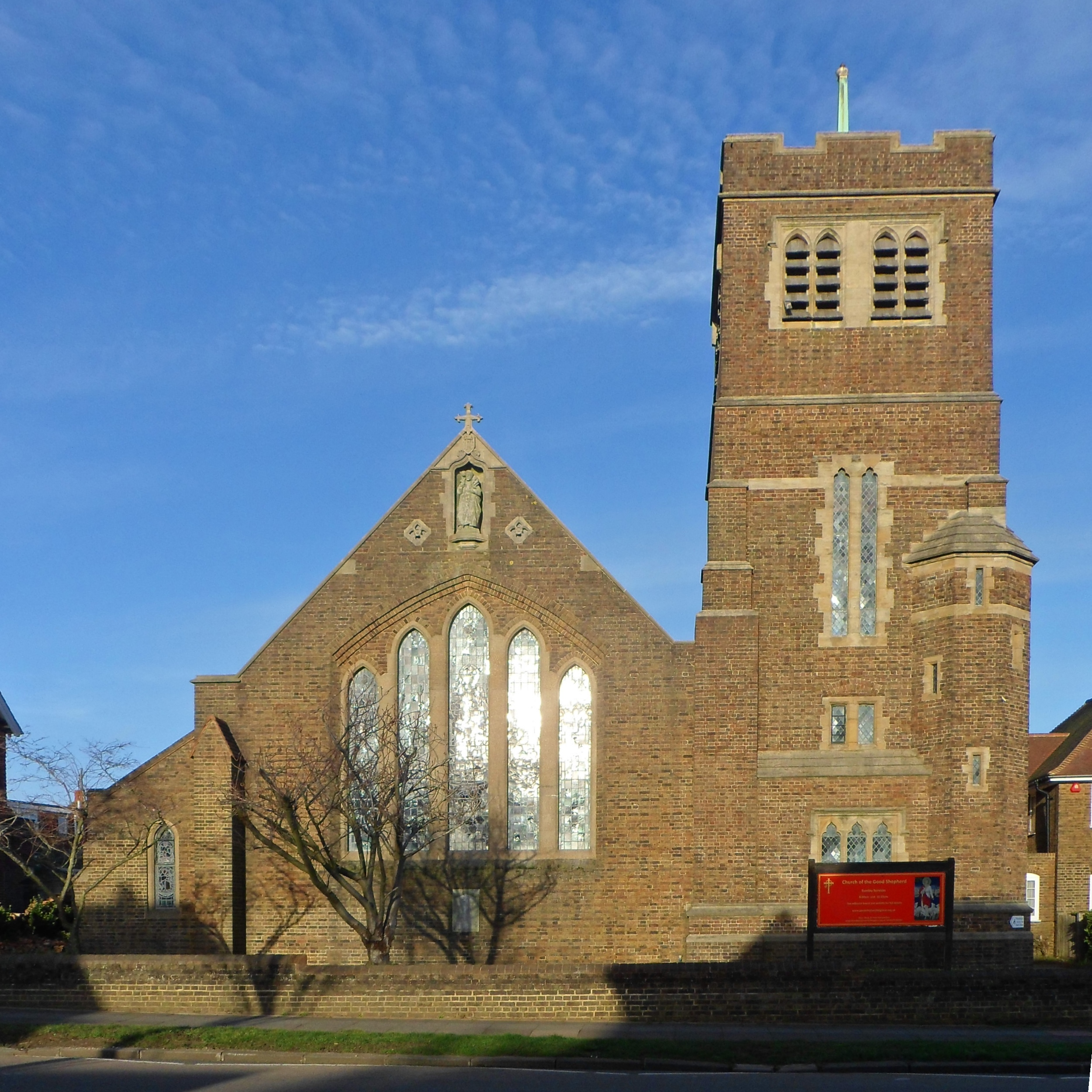
- Church of the Good Shepherd
- 50.8417°N 0.1580°W
- OS grid reference: TQ 29797 06308
- Location: 272 Dyke Road, Brighton, Brighton and Hove BN1 2AE
- Country: England
- Denomination: Anglican
- Churchmanship: High church
- Website: www.goodshepherdbrighton.org.uk

History
- Status: Parish church
- Founded: 1920
- Dedication: Good Shepherd
- Dedicated: 23 June 1927
- Consecrated: 31 May 1922

Architecture
- Functional status: Active
- Heritage designation: Grade II listed
- Designated: 26 August 1999
- Architect: Edward Prioleau Warren
- Style: Gothic Revival
- Groundbreaking: 2 July 1921
- Completed: 1927

Administration
- Province: Canterbury
- Diocese: Chichester
- Archdeaconry: Chichester
- Deanery: Rural Deanery of Brighton
- Parish: The Good Shepherd, Preston, Brighton

Clergy
- Priest: Mthr Alice Smith

The Church of the Good Shepherd is an Anglican church on Dyke Road on the border of Brighton and Hove, constituent parts of the English city of Brighton and Hove. Although just inside Brighton, most of the parish is within the boundaries of Hove, and the official name of the parish reflects the fact that it was originally part of the large ecclesiastical parish of Preston—a village north of Brighton. The building, designed by Edward Prioleau Warren in a simple Gothic style in the 1920s, has been given Grade II listed status in view of its architectural importance.

== History ==
Preston, a village approximately 1.5 miles (2.4 km) north of the centre of Brighton, had its own ecclesiastical parish until 1531. In that year, the parish was united with that of Hove, which was then a similar-sized village to the southwest, to form the joint benefice of Hove-cum-Preston. In 1879 the parishes were separated again. By this time, residential development along Dyke Road—historically one of the main routes into Brighton from the north, and turnpiked since 1777—was nearly complete. The boundary between Brighton and Hove was aligned along the west side of the road in 1873, but this did not affect the parish of Preston.

Prebendary Gerald Henry Moor became vicar of the newly separate parish in 1905. Known for his cricketing skills earlier in his life, he held the position for 11 years until his death on 31 May 1916. His widow, Alice, decided to fund the construction of a church in his memory in part of the parish where there were no nearby Anglican places of worship. A temporary iron church was built on the east side of Dyke Road soon afterwards, and in December 1919 a committee was formed to inspect the plans submitted by architect Edward Warren. Alice Moor laid the foundation stone in 1920, and building work started on 2 July 1921; local firm Packham, Sons and Palmer were employed to execute Warren's design. The Bishop of Chichester, Winfrid Oldfield Burrows, consecrated the building on 31 May 1922.

The church became parished on 13 October 1922. The new parish was formed from the section of Preston parish west of the Brighton Main Line, previously within the jurisdiction of St John the Evangelist's Church, and part of the parish of St Luke's Church on Old Shoreham Road. The population of the area was about 4,000. The east end of the church (the rear of the building) was extended in 1927. The same building firm was used again, and they added a chancel, vestry, Lady chapel and one extra bay on the nave. A square tower was also added at the front (west end), and the church was dedicated in its new form on 23 June 1927. A new church hall was built in 1936 to replace the former iron church, which had latterly been used as a church hall.

== Architecture ==
Edward Warren's design for the Church of the Good Shepherd was simple Gothic. The exterior was built in mixed, mostly brown, brick with some concrete and stone facings. There is a mixture of lancet and wide dormer windows. The interior, consisting of a five-bay nave and chancel under a tiled roof, is wide and low beneath a wagon ceiling. There is a Lady chapel at the southeast corner, another chapel on the northeast side containing a memorial to casualties of the First World War, a vestry, porch and the tower, which contains bells and is topped by a battlemented parapet and a flèche. The west end, next to the tower, has a series of five lancet windows in a recessed pointed arch; above these is a statue depicting the Good Shepherd. The Lady chapel has stained glass, and the church's interior fittings include a reredos.

== The church today ==
The Church of the Good Shepherd was listed at Grade II by English Heritage on 26 August 1999. It is one of 1,124 Grade II-listed buildings and structures, and 1,218 listed buildings of all grades, in the city of Brighton and Hove.

There are three services every Sunday, including Evensong, and either two or three prayer services or Eucharistic services on other days of the week. Taizé-style services take place several times a year.

The extent of the parish is the same as when it was defined in 1922. Its boundaries are the railway line between Preston Park station and Dyke Road Drive; Highcroft Villas; Dyke Road; Old Shoreham Road; Hove Park; Goldstone Crescent; Woodland Drive; Tredcroft Road; and Tivoli Crescent North.

== See also ==
- Grade II listed buildings in Brighton and Hove: C–D
- List of places of worship in Brighton and Hove

== Bibliography ==
- Carder, Timothy (1990). The Encyclopaedia of Brighton. Lewes: East Sussex County Libraries. ISBN 0-86147-315-9.
- Dale, Antony (1989). Brighton Churches. London: Routledge. ISBN 0-415-00863-8.
- Elleray, D. Robert (2004). Sussex Places of Worship. Worthing: Optimus Books. ISBN 0-9533132-7-1.
- Nairn, Ian; Pevsner, Nikolaus (1965). The Buildings of England: Sussex. Harmondsworth: Penguin Books. ISBN 0-14-071028-0.
