= Headley Court =

British rehabilitation centre

Defence Medical Rehabilitation Centre Headley Court
- Near Epsom, Surrey in England
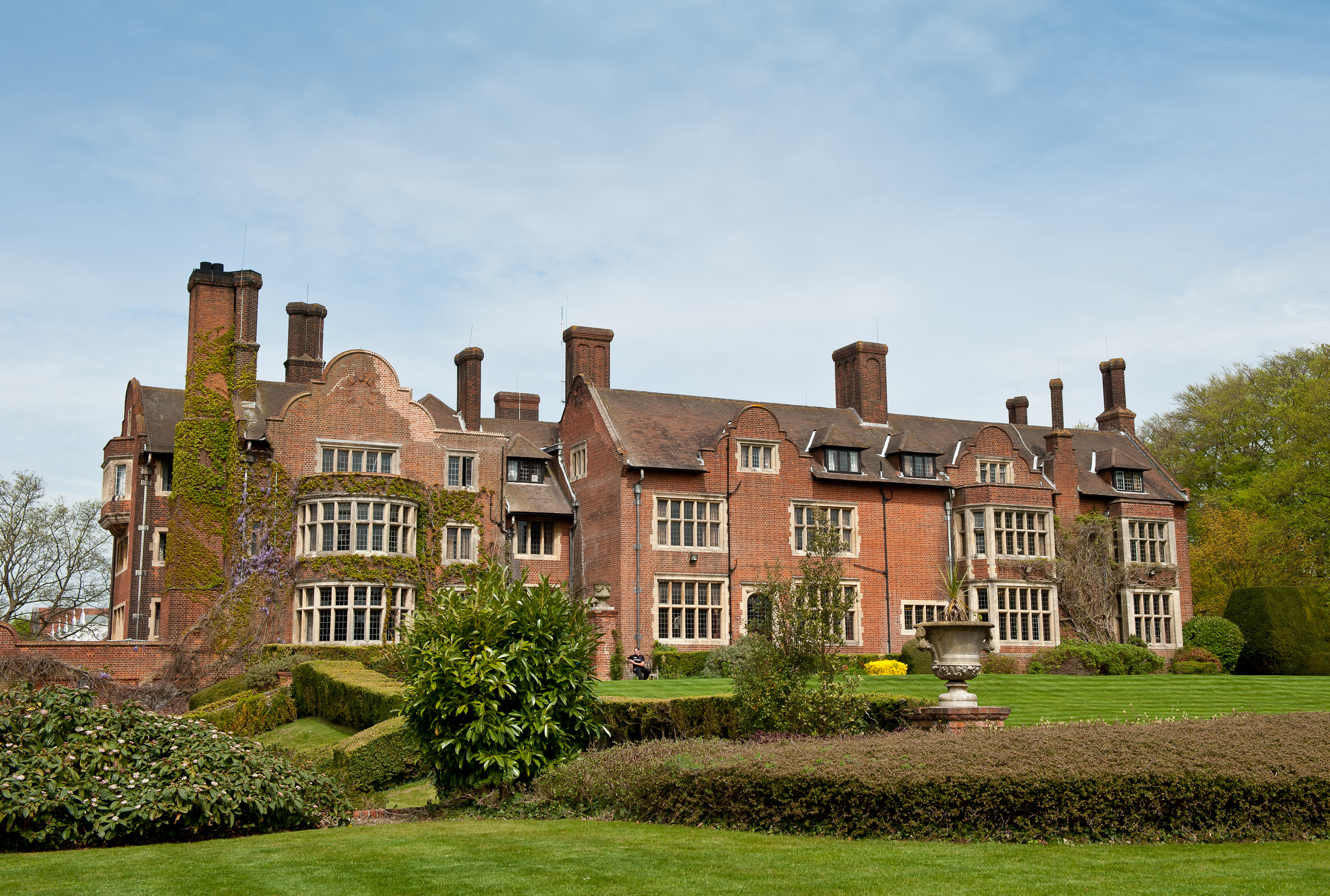
- DMRC Headley Court

- Per Mutua (Latin for 'By Mutual')

Site information
- Type: Military medical rehabilitation centre
- Owner: Ministry of Defence
- Controlled by: Royal Air Force (1946–1985); Defence Medical Services (1985–2018)
- Condition: Closed

Location
- Location within Surrey
- Coordinates: 51°17′13.3″N 000°17′06.3″W
- Area: 30 hectares

Site history
- Built: 1899
- In use: 1946 – September 2018

Listed Building – Grade II
- Official name: Headley Court and attached former stables
- Designated: 18 July 2001
- Reference no.: 1389265

Defence Medical Rehabilitation Centre Headley Court (abbreviated to DMRC Headley Court, and more commonly known as Headley Court), formerly RAF Headley Court, was an 85-acre (34 ha) United Kingdom Ministry of Defence facility in Headley, near Epsom, Surrey, England. The site was sold by the MoD in 2018, upon purchase of Stanford Hall, and its conversion to the Defence and National Rehabilitation Centre.

It was used as a rehabilitation centre for injured members of the British Armed Forces between 1985 and 2018.

== History and overview ==
Headley Court was an Elizabethan farm house bought by the Cunliffe family, from Tyrrell's Wood, Leatherhead. They later sold this farm house and built in 1899 the imposing mansion at the centre of Headley Court to the north, namely under Lord Cunliffe, who was Chairman of the Bank of England. Its architect was Edward Warren. During World War II, it was used as the Headquarters for the VII Corps and then for the Canadian Corps. During the war, nearby Headley Heath was used as a training ground for engineers building airstrips and trench systems then demolishing them again.

It was purchased after that war with money from the Royal Air Force Pilots and Crews Fund, a public collection as a tribute to the deeds, including the Battle of Britain efforts of the RAF. Since the war and until 2019, it was used as a Royal Air Force and Joint Services medical rehabilitation centre. which aimed to return all those service personnel injured or seriously ill to full fitness.

In November 2005, the Prince of Wales and the Duchess of Cornwall visited the centre. They met Major David Bradley of the Princess of Wales's Royal Regiment who had been given a five per cent chance of survival, after coming under fire from a Rocket Propelled Grenade launcher (RPG) in Basra, southern Iraq in 2004. Other notable patients in 2006/2007 include Sgt Mark Sutcliffe, The Royal Anglian Regiment, Sgt Stuart Pearson, 3 PARA and many others.

In July 2014, the Minister of Defence, Philip Hammond, announced that the services provided by Headley Court would be transferred to a new centre to be developed at Stanford Hall. The opening of the new Defence and National Rehabilitation Centre by the Duke of Cambridge took place in June 2018. The centre at Headley Court ceased operations in September 2018 and the site was bought by Angle Property in May 2019. The plan was to redevelop the site including substantial new housing replacing many of the existing ancillary buildings.

In April 2020, during the COVID-19 pandemic, the site was offered to the National Health Service and on 4 May 2020 it was re-opened as the NHS Seacole Centre (in tribute to Mary Seacole and the BAME contribution to the NHS), aimed at treatment of non-critical COVID-19 patients and rehabilitation of COVID-19 patients.

In 2024, work started to demolish all the more recent buildings, retaining the listed Mansion House, which will be the centre of a Retirement Community owned and operated by Audley.

== Facilities ==
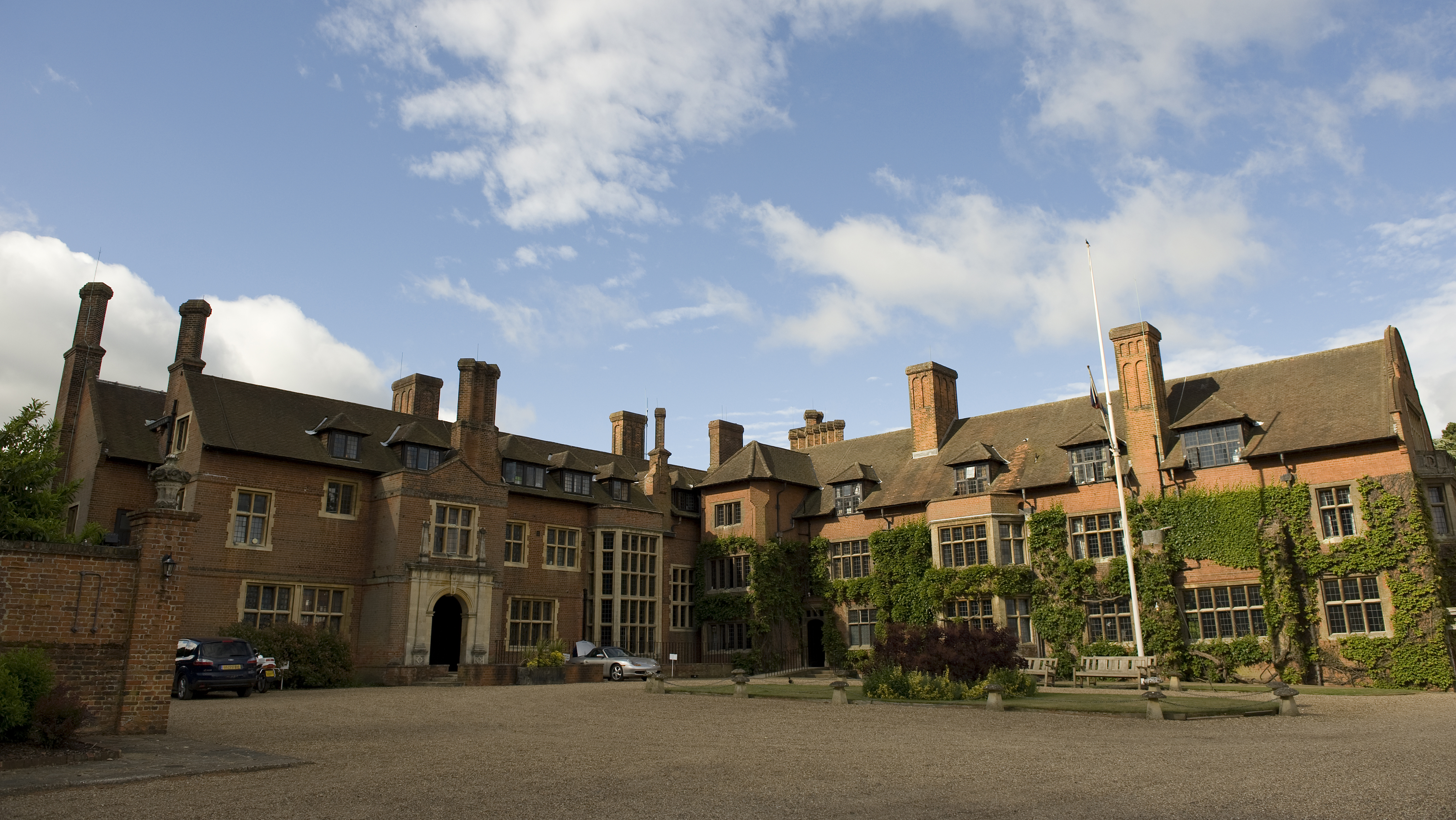
Headley Court

Rehabilitation staff averaged around 200 per year from all three services' medical and nursing branches, the longest established here being Princess Mary's Royal Air Force Nursing Service. These comprised specialist medical officers, nurses, remedial instructors, physiotherapists, occupational therapists, speech and language therapists, a cognitive therapist, social workers, engineers, and administration support staff. Not only did the centre deal with patients with new physical disabilities but it also dealt with patients with post-traumatic stress disorder.

The rehabilitation areas of the unit consisted of hydrotherapy pools, gymnasiums, and workshops for prosthetics. The high, wooded countryside setting and grounds of the unit were welcomed by staff and those recovering; Headley Heath and the North Downs Way share the escarpment and there is a high concentration of woodland wildlife. The 28 bed Peter Long Ward had single showers and nursing staff on call 24 hours a day, internet access and a kitchen area with washing and drying facilities for clothing. A further large ward opened in September 2010 of 30 beds, rest areas and equipment. Headley Court was in need of further facilities, particularly a full size swimming pool, as patients had to share a leisure centre in Leatherhead. The charity Help for Heroes was set up in late 2007, with a first objective of raising money to build these facilities.
