= Eastgate Hotel =

Hotel in Oxford, England

Mercure Eastgate Hotel
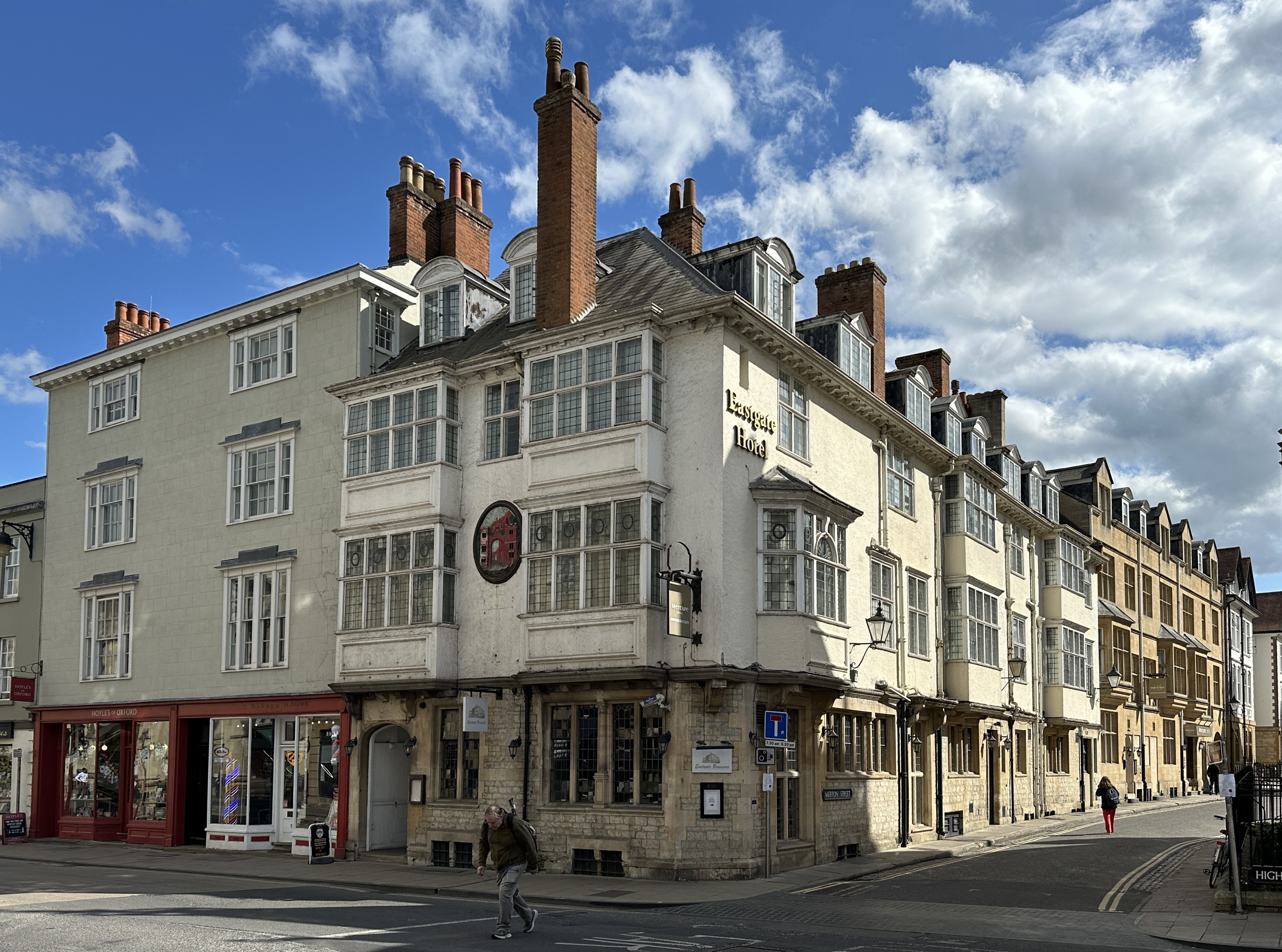
- The Eastgate Hotel from the High Street in Oxford
- Interactive map of the Mercure Eastgate Hotel area

General information
- Location: 73 High Street; Oxford, England; OX1 4BE
- Coordinates: 51.75224°N 1.24940°W
- Opening: 1900
- Owner: Mercure

Technical details
- Floor count: 3

Design and construction
- Architect: E.P. Warren

Other information
- Number of rooms: 81
- Parking: 9

Website
- mercure.com

The Mercure Eastgate Hotel (aka The Eastgate locally) is a hotel located in the historic university city of Oxford, England. It is located on the south side of Oxford's High Street near to the Ruskin School of Drawing and Fine Art and the Examination Schools of Oxford University.

== History ==
The site was previously occupied by an inn called the Crosse Sword. The hotel is a converted 17th-century coaching inn located at the corner of Merton Street on the site of the town wall's former east gate. The building was converted by Edward Prioleau Warren in 1899–1900, and the stuccoed style of the building echoes other 18th-century buildings in Oxford.

== Local legend ==
Ross Andrews links reports of the sound of men in armour and sightings of English Civil War era Royalist soldiers passing through walls to the hotel's location on the site of the old east gate, and speculates about a surprise attack by Parliamentarian forces.

== Literature ==
The Eastgate is mentioned in connection with C.S. Lewis in A Severe Mercy, by Sheldon Vanauken.

The Eastgate was mentioned by John Betjeman (1906–1984) in his poetry:

Then, with a loosely knotted shantung tie

And hair well soaked in Delhez' Genêt d'Or
Strolled to the Eastgate. Oxford marmalade
And a thin volume of Lowes Dickinson
