= 11 Dyke Road, Brighton =

1867 building in Brighton, England

11 Dyke Road
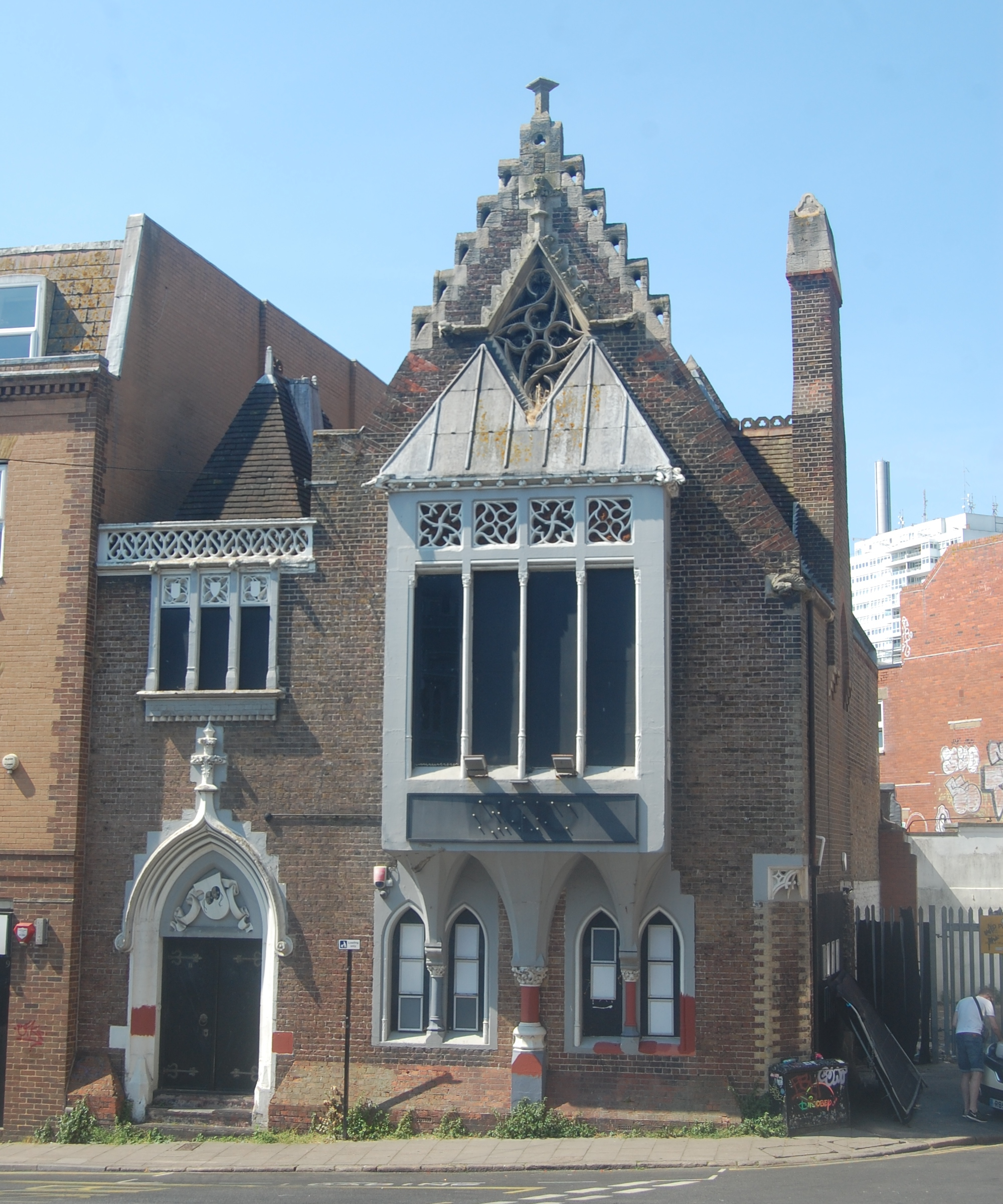
- The building from the northeast, photographed in 2023 when undergoing conversion from the Rialto Theatre to the Alphabet music venue

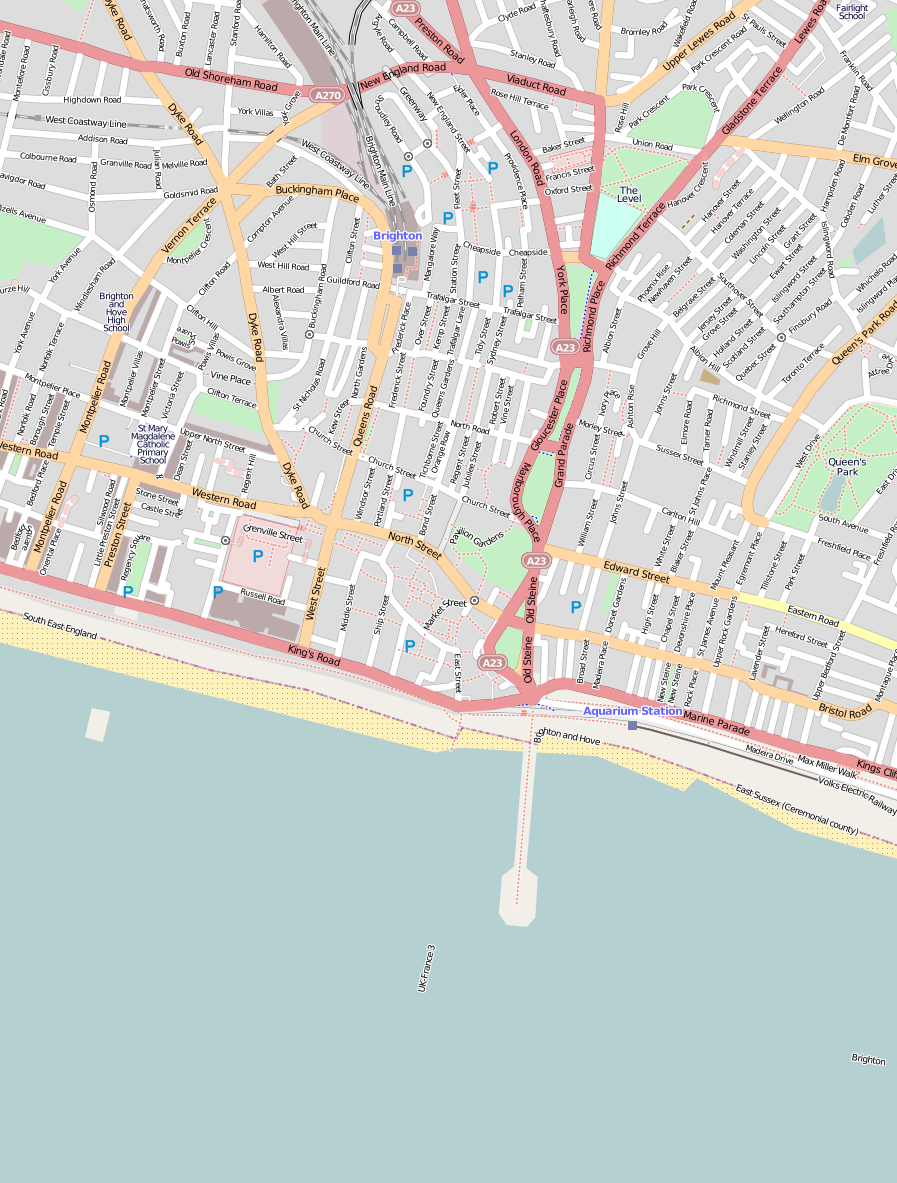
- Location within central Brighton
- 50.8242°N 0.1451°W
- Location: 11 Dyke Road, Brighton, Brighton and Hove, East Sussex BN1 3FE, United Kingdom

History
- Founded: 1816 or 1819
- Built: 1867
- Built for: Dr. Swan Downer

Site notes
- Architect: George Somers Leigh Clarke
- Architectural style: French/Flemish Gothic Revival

Listed Building – Grade II
- Official name: 11 Dyke Road
- Designated: 5 July 1973
- Reference no.: 1380450

The building at 11 Dyke Road in Brighton, part of the English city of Brighton and Hove, was in its most recent guise (2014–2023) the Rialto Theatre and as of January 2024 was being converted into a live music venue, but it originally housed the Swan Downer School for poor girls, for whom it was designed and built in 1867 by prolific architect George Somers Leigh Clarke. The highly ornate brick structure, in a "freely inventive" European Gothic style, has also served as a chapel and an office since it was vacated by the school, whose pupils were recognisable around Brighton in their blue and white uniform. English Heritage has listed the building at Grade II for its architectural and historical importance.

== History ==
Brighton's rapid growth from small fishing village to high-class seaside resort was set in motion in the late 18th century by factors such as royal patronage, the popularity (especially among the upper classes) of local doctor Richard Russell's "seawater cure" and better transport links. The population rose from about 2,000 in 1751, at the start of this growth period, to 65,569 in 1851, by which time it was the 15th largest town in England and Wales. By 1871, another 25,000 people had moved to the town.

The speed of development caused problems: many people lived in poverty, and access to schools was inadequate. Poor people from across the mostly rural county of Sussex moved to Brighton, by far its largest town, in search of employment; but service jobs were not secure and were mostly seasonal. Poor urban planning and the lack of piped water and sewage disposal made living conditions dangerous. Education for poor people was also substandard: until the Elementary Education Act 1870 was passed, there was no centralised provision of schooling for children below secondary level. Churches, private individuals and charitable institutions provided what they could.

One such person was Dr Swan Downer, a rich trader from London, who founded the Swan Downer School for poor girls in 1816 or 1819 at 12 Gardner Street in the North Laine area. In his will, he left £7,100 (£538,100 as of 2025) for the continuation of his work, and another £5,000 (£378,900 as of 2025) to provide a clothing fund for poor adults. Part of this endowment was used to build a Swan Downer school on land at the bottom of the road leading from central Brighton to Devil's Dyke on the South Downs. (Its address was originally given as 91 North Street, but the building faced Dyke Road and was later redesignated 13 Dyke Road and later still 11 Dyke Road.)

Rev. Henry Michell Wagner, the Vicar of Brighton for much of the 19th century, laid the school's first stone in June 1867. He spent much of his time and money helping Brighton's poor people, commissioning and paying for six churches where sittings were free (not subject to "pew rents"—an expensive 19th-century tradition in the Church of England) and getting involved in the provision of schools, houses and other institutions. The architect commissioned was George Somers Leigh Clarke; he was not local, but both he and his son (also George) designed several buildings in Brighton, and another relative was the Clerk of the Vestry in Brighton for about 60 years. Somers Clarke senior's other works in Brighton were the School for the Blind (1861–1865)—built in a Venetian Gothic style and considered "one of the most interesting Victorian buildings in Brighton", but demolished in 1958—and the new façade, tower and timber-framed roof of the former Holy Trinity Church.

The school catered for working-class girls for more than 70 years, until about 1939. They were provided with a uniform of blue frocks with white cuffs and collars. Changes to the provision of elementary education, brought about by the Education Act 1902 and the local education authority's opening of many new schools in the first decades of the 20th century, reduced the school's importance, and by 1939 it had become a chapel under the name Refuge Church. This use was brief; soon after World War II, the building was converted for commercial use, and several companies used it as offices. Since 1969, when it became "Sloopy's Nitespot and Discotheque", the building has been used as a nightclub. By 1990 it was operating as "Fozzie's Club", owned by Brighton & Hove Albion F.C. player Steve Foster; it later became "The Sanctuary", "The Shrine", "Club New York" and "The Church" before being renamed "New Hero"—the name it bore until its closure in 2011. In January 2012, the owners of a nightclub in Worthing announced that they wanted to convert the building into the "House of the Lost"—a two-storey maze with a horror theme; planning permission for this was granted in April 2012. By 2014 the building was vacant again, and in October 2014 it was acquired by local lettings agent Roger Kay. He announced plans to turn the building into a theatre. A planning application for internal alterations appropriate to its new use, such as the formation of a mezzanine floor and the installation of a stage and box office, was submitted and rejected in November 2014. It opened as the Rialto Theatre on 4 December 2014 and closed in 2023. Work then began in the spring of that year to convert it into a music venue called Alphabet.

The former school was listed at Grade II by English Heritage on 5 July 1973. This status is given to "nationally important buildings of special interest". As of February 2001, it was one of 1,124 Grade II-listed buildings and structures, and 1,218 listed buildings of all grades, in the city of Brighton and Hove.

== Architecture ==
The distinctive style of 11 Dyke Road has been described as French, Flemish or German Gothic Revival. Somers Clarke's "freely inventive" interpretation of that design was executed in brown brick with some red brickwork and stone dressings (now painted white). The steeply pitched roof is mostly tiled.

The building has two storeys and two bays facing east towards Dyke Road. The southern (entrance) bay is narrower, shorter and has a very steep hipped roof; a drawing in the architects' journal Building News in 1873 showed a tall flèche on top of this roof. The door is set into an ogee-headed white-painted arch; the tympanum formed by the space between the arch and the door is decorated with carved scrolls and a shield. Around the door, columns terminate in intricate foliated capitals. A first-floor window with three lights has similar decoration above. In front of the roof is a cornice and parapet with some decorative scrollwork. The main bay has two pairs of lancet windows on the ground floor and a large, four-light oriel window above. This projects from the surrounding brickwork and also has tall, extremely narrow windows on each side. Above each pane is a panel with tracery described as "highly original" and "of great inventiveness". The cornice above this has gargoyles at the corners, and the roof has a prominent crow-stepped gable.

== See also ==
- Grade II listed buildings in Brighton and Hove: C–D
