= George Somers Leigh Clarke =

English architect

George Somers Clarke (1822–1882) was an English architect. He became a RIBA Associate in March 1845 and a Fellow in June 1859. He sat on RIBA Council. In 1868 he had offices at 20 Cockspur Street, London. He was a pupil of Sir Charles Barry and worked for him on designs for the Palace of Westminster in 1849.

Through working with Barry, he became sufficiently well respected to be invited to submit designs for buildings such as the Foreign Office, Law Courts and National Gallery, London. His competition design for the Midland Grand Hotel, St Pancras, London, whilst not the winning scheme, was considered highly enough to receive a premium from the judges. His buildings were regularly illustrated in the architectural press in the 1860s. He was the uncle of Somers Clarke (1841–1926) who was also an architect.

He travelled extensively in Europe. He married Louisa Harker Williamson in Croydon, Surrey, in March 1867. He was for many years resident at Chislehurst, Kent at a time when it was becoming a suburban district and he designed a number of houses there. He died at Walpole, Manor Park, Chislehurst, Kent on 4 July 1882, and is buried in the churchyard of St Nicholas' Church, Chislehurst.

== Works ==
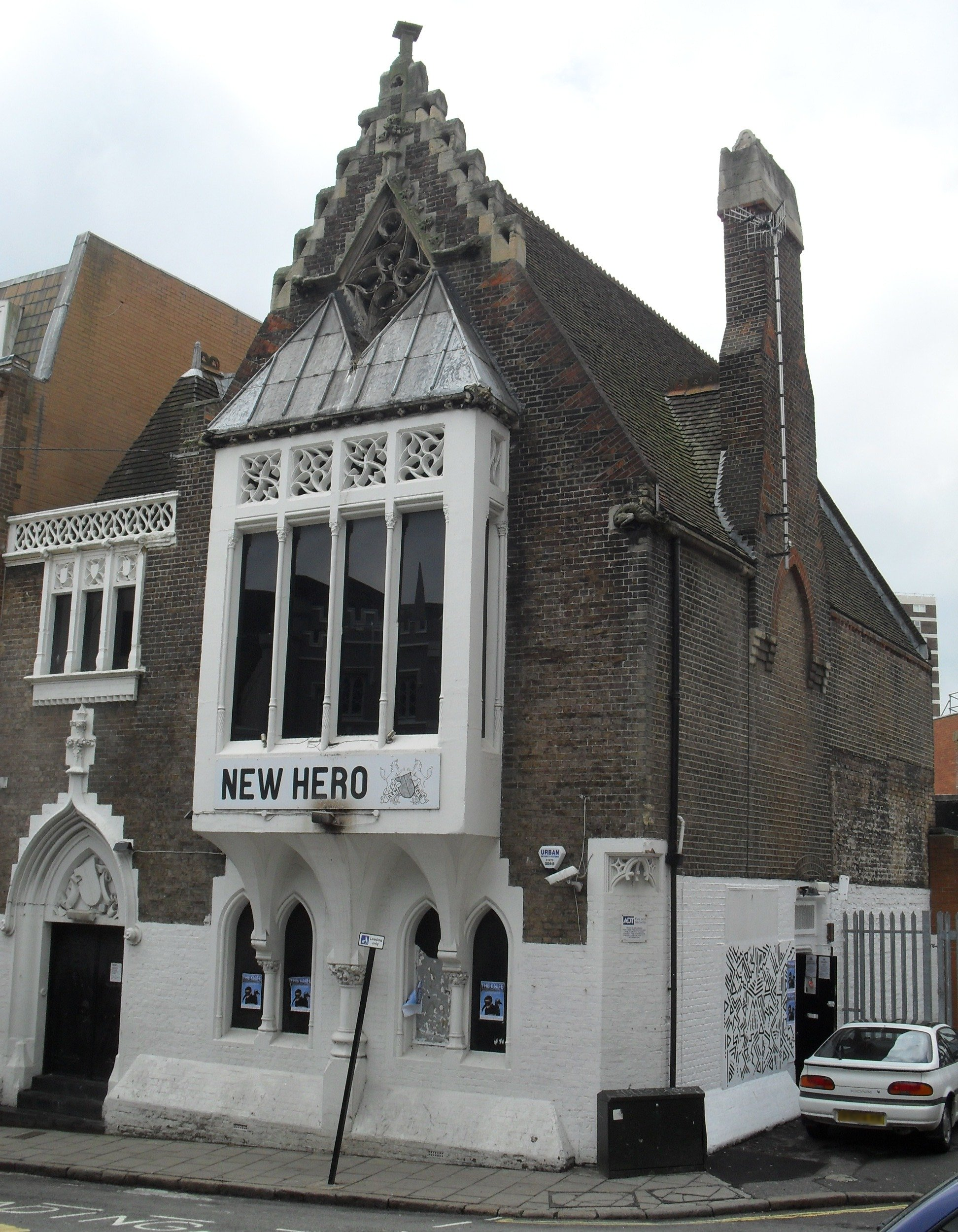
The former Swan Downer School (now a nightclub) at 11 Dyke Road, Brighton.

- Forest Hill Park (house and stables), Windsor.
- Rectory, Maresfield, East Sussex.
- Additions to Pinehurst, Box Hill, Surrey.
- Heathwood, Chislehurst, Kent.
- Millfields, Chislehurst, Kent.
- Farmhouse at Kensworth, Bedfordshire.
- Parrock Lodge, Gravesend, Kent.
- New Chancel, Trinity Church, Marylebone, London.
- Warehouses, Wood Street, London.
- Warehouses, Cripplegate, London.
- Warehouse, New Basinghall Street, London.
- Brett's Warehouse, High Holborn, London.
- Alterations to Haymarket Theatre, Haymarket, London.
- 1852 Restoration of St Peter's Church, Dunstable.
- 1852 Works to Church of St John the Baptist, Eldersfield, Worcestershire.
- 1860 London Printing and Publishing Company, St John's Street, London.
- 1860 Cowley Manor, Cowley, Gloucestershire.
- 1861 Brighton Blind Asylum, Eastern Road, Brighton (demolished 1958).
- 1862 The Hammam (Turkish baths), 76 Jermyn Street, London (destroyed in the blitz, 17 April 1941).
- 1862 Merchant Seamen's Orphan Asylum and chapel, Snaresbrook, Essex.
- c. 1865 Mountains, Noble Tree Road, Hildenborough, Kent.
- 1866 General Credit & Discount Company's Office, 7 Lothbury, London.
- 1866 Sackville (formerly Foxbush) (house and stables), Hildenborough, Kent.
- 1866 Auction Mart, Tokenhouse yard, London (demolished).
- 1867–69 Swan Downer School, 11 Dyke Road, Brighton.
- c. 1870 Additions to Mount Felix House, Walton on Thames (demolished 1967).
- 1872 Restoration of All Saint's Church, West Bromwich.
- 1872–75 St Martin's Church, Round Hill, Brighton.
- 1873 Milton Hall, Gravesend, Kent (demolished 1930).
- c. 1873 Restoration of St Mary's Church, Hatley Road, Potton, Bedfordshire.
- 1874 Harley, Manor Park, Chislehurst, Kent.
- 1874 The Manor House, Manor Park, Chislehurst.
- 1874 Pelham, Manor Park, Chislehurst, Kent.
- 1874 Walpole, Manor Park, Chislehurst (own home).
- 1874 Walsingham, Manor Park, Chislehurst, Kent.
- 1874–84 Wyfold Court, Rotherfield Peppard, Oxfordshire.
- 1876 Manor House, Broadway, Sidmouth, Devon.
- 1877 Rectory, 2 St Paul's Cray Road, Chislehurst, Kent.
- 1878 Kemnal Wood, Chislehurst, Kent (demolished 1972).
- 1878 Works to St Michael's Church, Houghton Regis, Bedfordshire.
- 1878 Grange House, St Paul's Cray Road, Chislehurst.
- 1878 Cleveland, St Paul's Cray Road, Chislehurst.
- 1878 Warren House, St Paul's Cray Road, Chislehurst.
- 1878 Crayfield, St Paul's Cray Road, Chislehurst.
- 1878 Selwood House, Kemnal Road, Chislehurst, Kent.
- 1879 Alterations, Church of St Nicholas, Islip, Oxfordshire.
- 1881 Coffee Tavern, 43–45 High Street, Chislehurst, Kent.
- 1882 The Warren, Croydon Road, Hayes, Kent.
