= Edward Prioleau Warren =

British architect (1856–1937)

Edward Prioleau Warren (30 October 1856 – 23 November 1937) was a British architect and archaeologist.

== Life ==
He was born at Cotham, Bristol, the fifth child of Algernon William Warren, JP. Sir Thomas Herbert Warren was his elder brother. He was educated at Clifton College in Bristol, and subsequently articled to G.F. Bodley, whose biography he later wrote. He shared an office at 5 Staple Inn, London, (but not a practice) with his fellow Bodley pupil A.H. Skipworth. He provided illustrations for the Transactions of the Guild and School of Handicraft in 1890. He joined the Art Workers Guild in 1892 and was Master in 1913. He practised extensively in Oxford, no doubt helped by the fact that his brother was President of Magdalen College. Basil Bramston Hooper, later an architect in New Zealand, was in his office, c.1901–04. In 1901, he was added to the list of architects authorised to work on the Grosvenor Estate in London, but he never did so. In 1914, he gave evidence on behalf of the Commissioners of Works into a proposed Preservation Order on 75 Dean Street, Soho, London. During the First World War he was seconded to the Serbian Army, and designed the War Cemetery at Basra. In 1916, he was said to have had considerable experience of hospital construction. At the beginning of his career, he built and altered a number of churches, but he is known principally for domestic buildings in an understated revival of English late 17th century styles: his main works were lodgings for Oxford colleges and minor country houses.

Warren married Margaret Cecil Louisa Morrell, sister of Philip Morrell on 6 October 1894, and one of their sons, Brigadier-General Christopher Prioleau Warren, became a noted bibliophile and received the Military Cross in the First World War and MBE and Legion of Merit for the second World War. Another son, Peter Warren, succeeded to his father's practice as an architect. Warren himself was a friend and adviser to the American novelist, Henry James, who lived at Lamb House, Rye, Sussex; their correspondence is now in the Huntington Library in San Marino, California.

Warren lived the last thirty years of his life at Breach House, Halfpenny Lane, Cholsey, built in 1906, which he designed for himself. He died on 23 November 1937.

== List of works ==
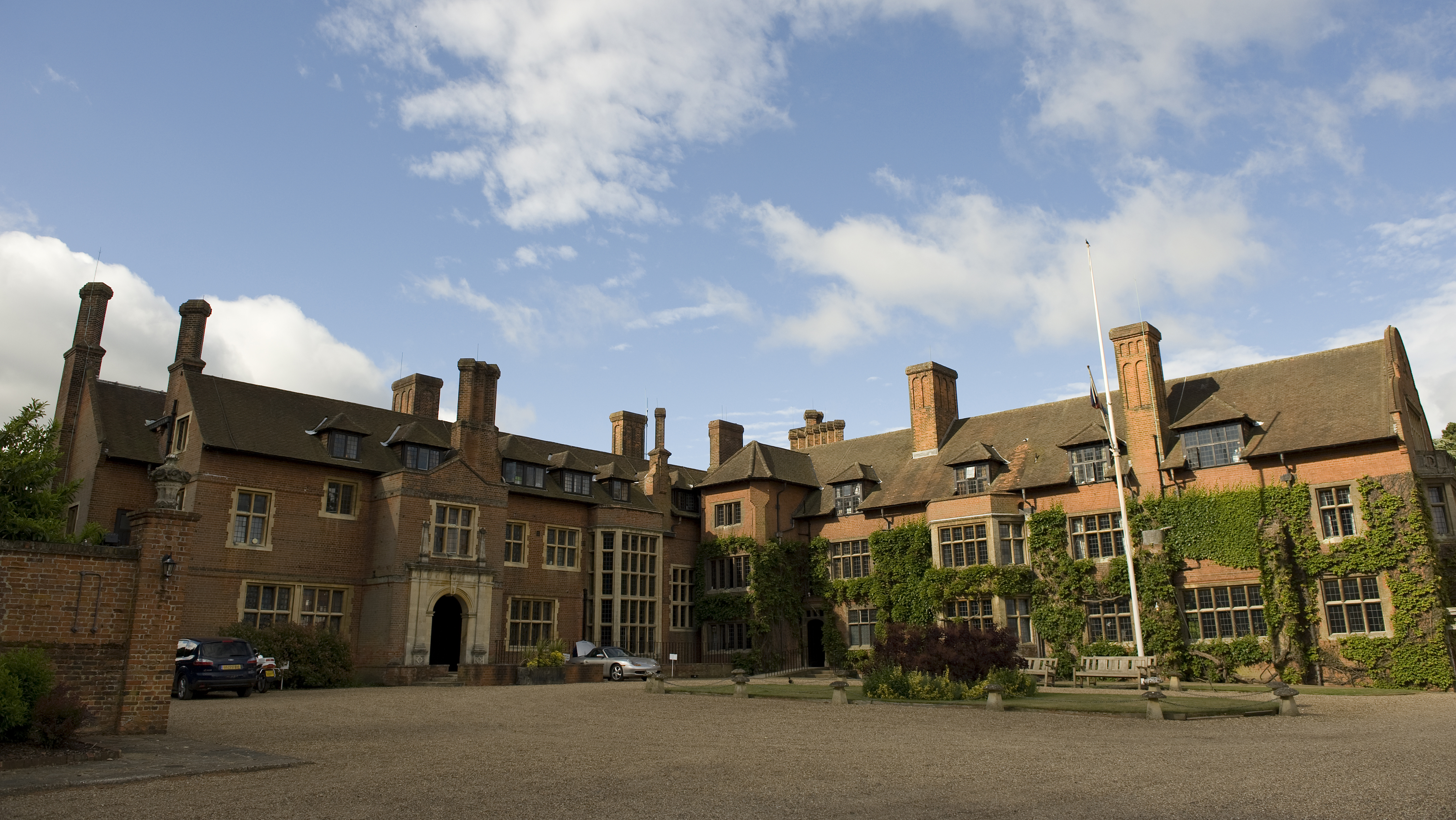
Headley Court, Headley

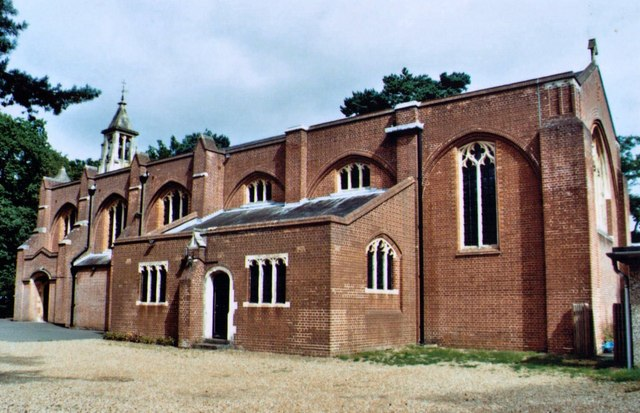
St. Michael and All Angels Church, Bassett, Southampton

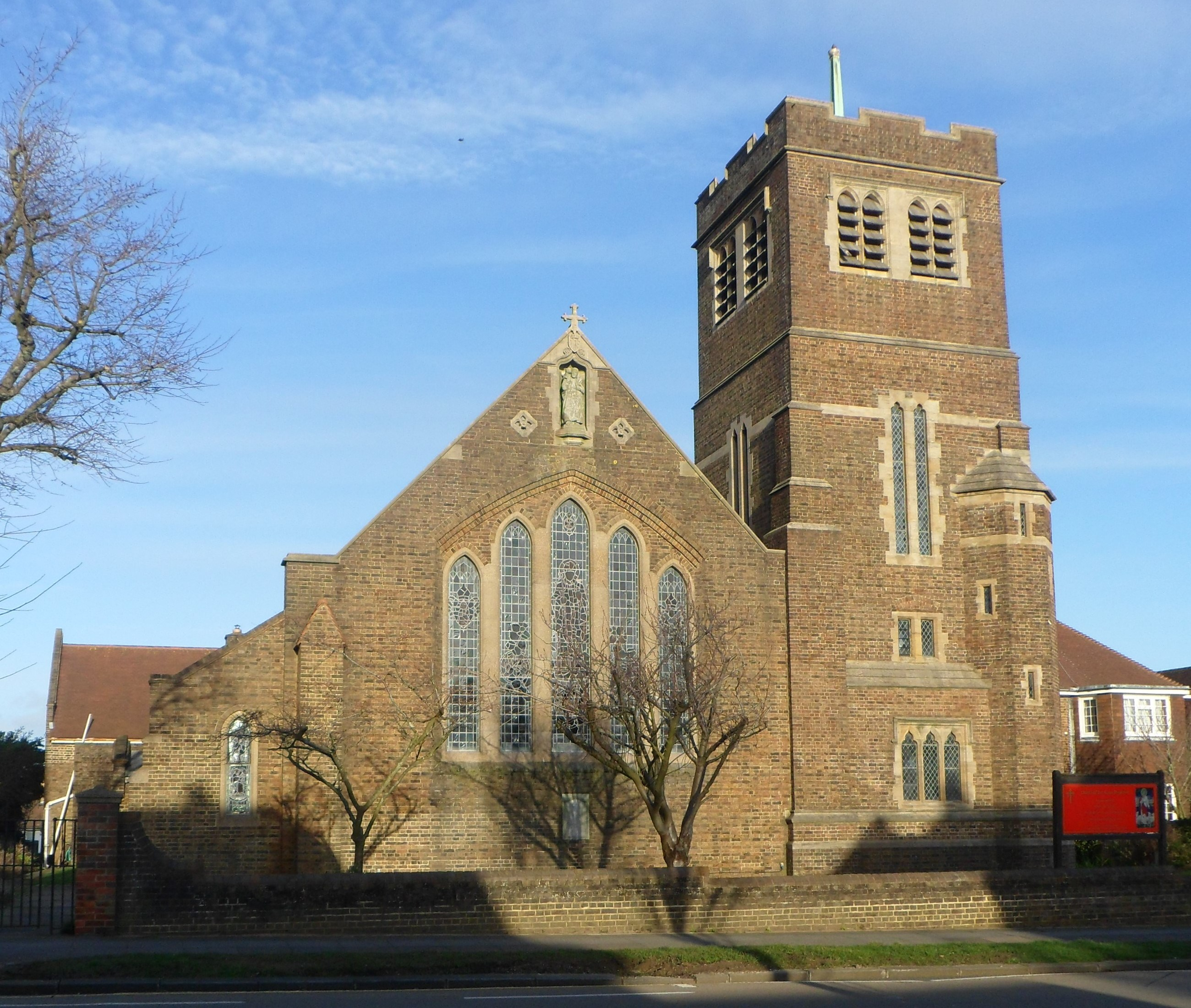
Church of the Good Shepherd, Brighton

- Barkerend in Bradford (West Yorks): St Clement's Church, 1892–94 (listed grade II*)
- Bishopstoke (Hants): St. Mary's Church, n.d.
- Blackwood (Monmouthshire): Maesruddud (now Maes Manor), new house, 1900–07
- Brighton (Sussex): Church of the Good Shepherd, Dyke Road: new church, 1920–22; vicarage, 1923; extension to church, 1927; all for Alice Mary Moor
- Bryanston (Dorset): St Martin's Church, 1895–98, for Lord Portman
- Cambridge: Gonville and Caius College, Cambridge, alterations to west range of Gonville Court, 1912
- Cambridge: Trinity College, works, n.d.
- Caversham (Oxon): St. John the Evangelist Church, n.d.
- Chantmarle (Dorset), works in the garden, 1919
- Chelsea (Middx): Shelley House, Chelsea Embankment, 1912
- Cholsey (Oxon): Breach House, new house, for himself, c.1905
- Clifton (Glos): Clifton College, works, n.d.
- Epping: (Essex): War Memorial, 1921 (listed grade II)
- Falfield (Glos): Heneage Court, restoration and extension of house and new garden for Russell Thomas, 1913
- Fulham (London): St John's Church, Walham Green, alterations, 1893
- Great Milton (Oxon), Manor House, alterations and extensions and new gatepiers, 1908
- Headley Court (Surrey), new house, 1898 (listed grade II)
- Kensington (London): 1 Campden Hill, new house, 1915
- Kensington (London): 5 Palace Green, new house, 1905
- Kensington (London): Estcort House, Kensington Palace Gardens, 1904
- Littleton Pannell (Wiltshire): A Becketts, extension of house, 1904
- Lowestoft (Suffolk): St. Peter's Church, chancel extension, 1920s
- Melplash Court (Dorset), rebuilding of west wing, 1922 and perhaps extensions in the 1930s
- Netherbury (Dorset): Slape Manor, alterations including decorative plasterwork, 1931
- Newark (Nottinghamshire): Church, font cover, 1891
- Newlyn (Cornwall): Fishermen's Institute, c1911
- Newlyn: War Memorial, 1920 (listed grade II)
- Oxford: Balliol College, north-west range in Garden Quad, 1906
- Oxford: Balliol College, range north of Basevi buildings, 1912–15
- Oxford: Eastgate Hotel, High Street, c1899-01
- Oxford: High Street, college lodgings and shops for Magdalen College, 1901
- Oxford: Merton College, works, n.d.
- Oxford: Radcliffe Infirmary, outpatients' block, 1911–13; William Dunn School of Pathology, 1925–27
- Oxford: St Cross Church, restoration, including new clerestory windows, 1893
- Oxford: St John's College, extension of New Building, North Quad, 1901
- Oxford: Victoria Fountain, Magdalen Bridge, 1899
- Penkhull (Staffordshire): St Thomas's Church, addition of aisles, 1892
- Rugby (Warks): Rugby School, works, n.d.
- Southampton (Hampshire): St. Michael and All Angels Church, Bassett Avenue, 1897–1910
- Spetchley Park (Worcs): new nursery wing and general improvements, 1907
- St John's Wood (London): Hanover Lodge, High St., block of mansion flats, 1903–04
- Steep (Hants): Bedales School, works, 1899-1907
- Wandsworth (London): Magdalen Park Estate, layout and design of houses for Magdalen College, Oxford, c.1901–20
- Wanstead (London): St. Columba's Church, n.d.
- West Lavington (Wilts): Manor House, alterations, 1905
- Westminster (London): Westminster School, works, n.d.
- Woking (Surrey): Gorse Hill, Hook Heath Road, new house (now Indosuez Bank Training Centre), 1910
- Wymondham Abbey (Norfolk), triptych behind high altar, c.1904 (relocated from elsewhere, 1991)

== Sources ==
- Architectural Journal, vol. 85, 2 Dec 1937, p. 861 (obituary)
- The Builder, vol. 153, 26 Nov 1937, p. 965 (obituary)
- RIBA Journal, vol. 45, 1937, pp. 203–04 (obituary)
- A.S. Gray, Edwardian architecture: a biographical dictionary, 1988
