= 155–158 North Street, Brighton =

Grade II listed historic building in Brighton, England

155–158 North Street
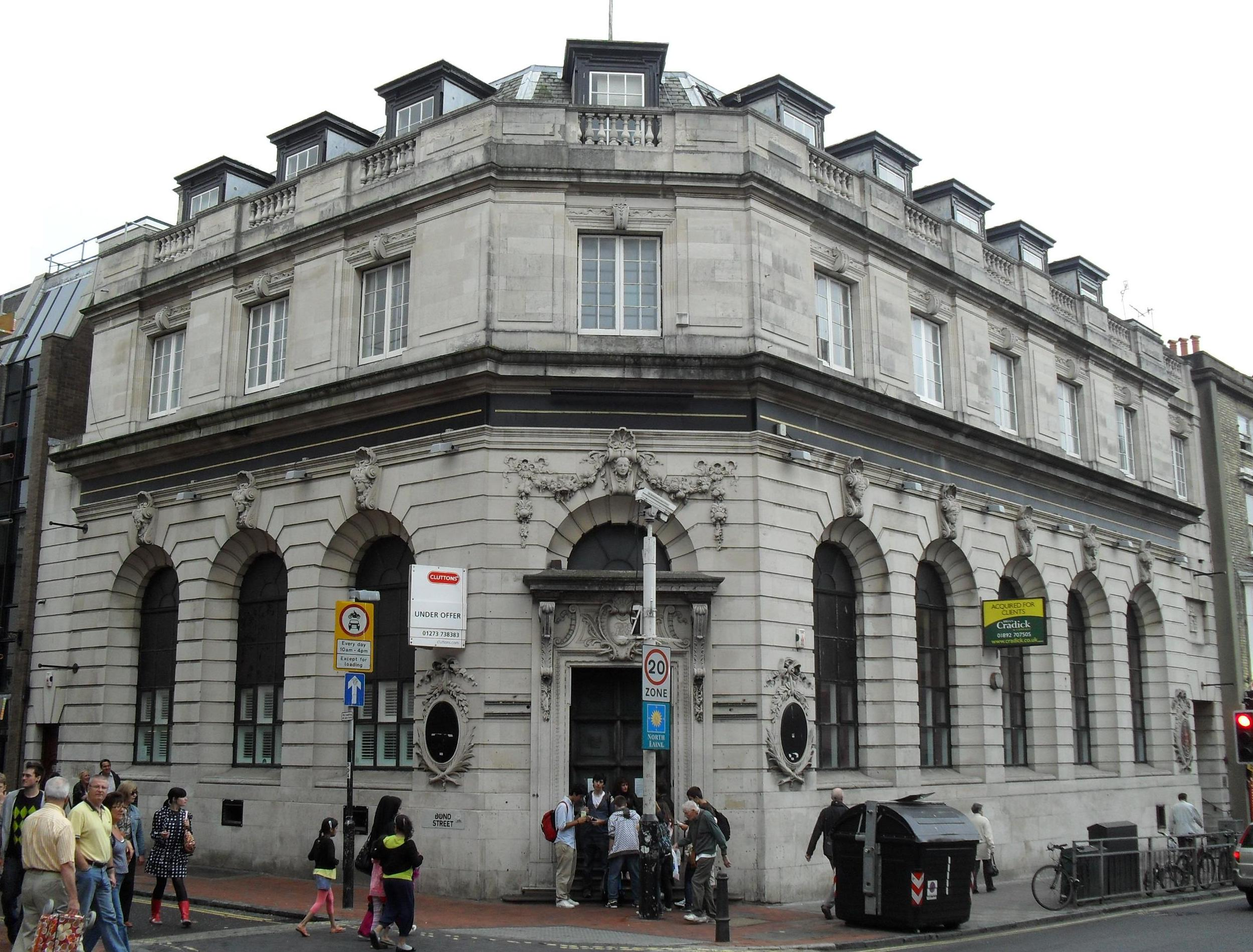
- The building from the west-southwest in 2010, before its refurbishment

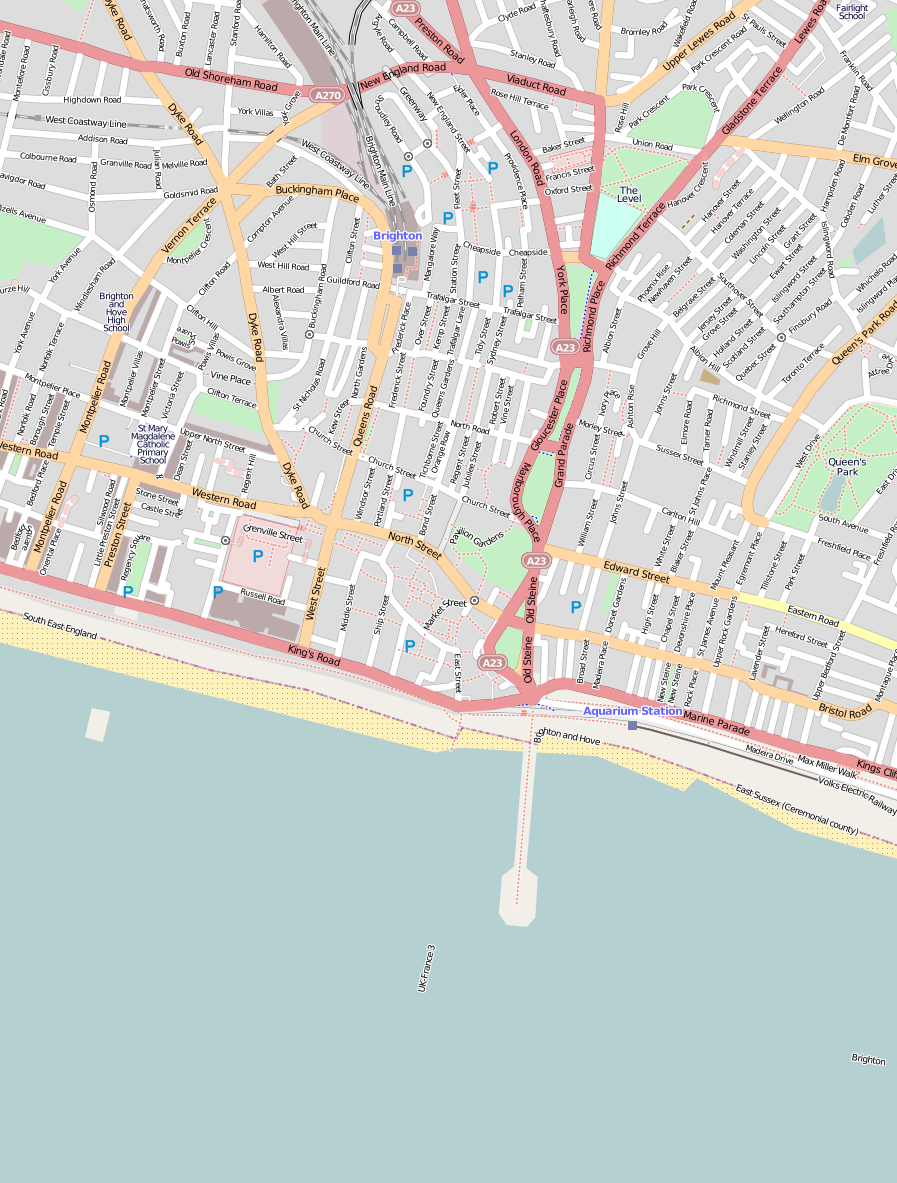
- Location within central Brighton
- 50.8230°N 0.1403°W
- Location: 155–158 North Street, Brighton, Brighton and Hove BN1 1EA, United Kingdom

History
- Built: 1921–23
- Built for: National Provincial Bank

Site notes
- Architect(s): F.C.R Palmer and Clayton & Black (executant architects)
- Architectural style: Louis XVI Neoclassical
- Restored: 2010
- Restored by: J D Wetherspoon plc

Listed Building – Grade II
- Official name: National Westminster Bank, 155–158 North Street
- Designated: 23 June 1994
- Reference no.: 1380621

The building at 155–158 North Street in Brighton, part of the English coastal city of Brighton and Hove, was built between 1921 and 1923 as a branch of National Provincial Bank. The King Louis-style bank was built on the site of several shops (with offices above). The properties were acquired by the National Provincial Bank during 1916–20. The Brighton Gazette had occupied 155a North Street since 1910, when its long-time home at number 150 was converted into the Cinema de Luxe. Published by William James Towner, the paper’s full title was the Brighton Gazette, Hove Post and Sussex Telegraph (It later became part of National Westminster Bank's network of branches following the merger of National Provincial and Westminster Bank). In 2011 it became J D Wetherspoon's second pub in central Brighton. One of many buildings by the prolific local architecture firm of Clayton & Black, whose work in various styles can be found across the city, it forms an important component of the range of banks, offices and commercial buildings on North Street—a significant commercial thoroughfare since the 18th century. In particular, the "good attention to detail" shown throughout the building's Louis XVI-style façade has been praised. English Heritage has listed it at Grade II for its architectural and historical importance.

== History ==
Brighton (originally Brighthelmston) originated as a fishing village bounded by four streets named after the points of the compass. The land to the north, west and east was agricultural. North Street lay on the main route towards London, and it thrived as the town grew in the 18th century: by 1800 it was the centre of commerce, lined with inns, shops and offices. Many buildings on the north side were removed between 1874 and 1879 when the road was widened, and offices and banks were attracted to the area. Large early 20th-century buildings included offices for the Prudential Association and the Royal Assurance Society and a branch of Midland Bank, and the north side of the street was soon "dominated" by such companies.

National Provincial Bank, a major retail bank founded in 1833, sought to open a branch in Brighton, and in 1921 they commissioned the Clayton & Black firm to work with their in-house architect F.C.R. Palmer to design a building on North Street at the corner of Bond Street. The site faced the Midland Bank branch of 1902. Clayton & Black had nearly 50 years of experience in Brighton and neighbouring Hove, designing an eclectic range of buildings to serve a variety of functions. Among other commissions, they were responsible for the Royal Assurance Society offices at 163 North Street.

The building was completed in 1923, and it was in use by National Provincial until the bank merged with the Westminster Bank in 1968 to form the National Westminster Bank. The branch was rebranded with that identity. From the 1990s, in response to changes in Government policy over alcohol licensing, many bank branches were sold for conversion into pubs and bars. There was already a National Westminster Bank branch a short distance away, at the corner of North Street and Pavilion Buildings, and 155–158 North Street was turned into a bar. By the early 21st century it operated under the name Saqqara. A sports bar and nightclub called The Gentleman's Turf then occupied the building, and it was later acquired by the J D Wetherspoon chain, which was granted permission by the city council in July 2010 to convert it into a pub. The Post & Telegraph opened on 21 December 2010. It is a short distance from the group's Bright Helm pub, and as of 2026 is one of four Wetherspoon outlets in the city of Brighton and Hove.

== Heritage ==
Under the name National Westminster Bank, 155–158 North Street was listed at Grade II by English Heritage on 23 June 1994. This status is given to "nationally important buildings of special interest". As of February 2001, it was one of 1,124 Grade II-listed buildings and structures, and 1,218 listed buildings of all grades, in the city of Brighton and Hove.

The building is within the North Laine Conservation Area, one of 34 conservation areas in the city of Brighton and Hove. This was designated by Brighton Council in 1977 and covers 41.37 acres (16.74 ha).

== Architecture ==
The stone-built structure is in the Louis XVI style, a derivative of Neoclassical architecture. Elements of the Edwardian Baroque style, which Clayton & Black used in their 1904 commission at 163 North Street, have also been identified. The building has been said to stand "glowering ... across the entrance to Bond Street" at T.B. Whinney's Edwardian/Italianate Midland Bank branch of 1902. The two-storey building has six windows facing North Street, a chamfered corner entrance bay and three windows to each floor facing Bond Street. There are dormer windows set into the slate-tiled mansard roof. There are three entrances: two subsidiary doorways in the outermost bays, and an elaborate arrangement in the corner bay consisting of straight-headed double doors decorated with zodiac-themed reliefs, set in an architrave with a cornice supported on corbels, below which is an escutcheon with a bas-relief coat of arms. Above the cornice and its entablature is a lavishly decorated Diocletian window surrounded by carved swags with a female face forming the centrepiece on top of the keystone. The whole of the ground floor is rusticated, including the concave, heavily recessed window surrounds in which tall round-arched windows are set. These windows have intricately carved keystones. A wide entablature forms separates the ground and first floors; above it, the windows are straight-headed and set below architraves with decorative keystones. Between each window is a slightly projecting panel. At the top of the building, a parapet runs around the whole building in front of the roof; it has balustraded sections in front of each dormer window. The dormers have distinctive architraves.

== See also ==
- Grade II listed buildings in Brighton and Hove: N–O
- Media related to 155–158 North Street, Brighton at Wikimedia Commons

== Notes ==
=== Bibliography ===
- Antram, Nicholas; Morrice, Richard (2008). Brighton and Hove. Pevsner Architectural Guides. London: Yale University Press. ISBN 978-0-300-12661-7.
- Brighton Polytechnic. School of Architecture and Interior Design (1987). A Guide to the Buildings of Brighton. Macclesfield: McMillan Martin. ISBN 1-869865-03-0.
- Collis, Rose (2010). The New Encyclopaedia of Brighton. (based on the original by Tim Carder) (1st ed.). Brighton: Brighton & Hove Libraries. ISBN 978-0-9564664-0-2.
