= 163 North Street, Brighton =

Building in Brighton, England

163 North Street
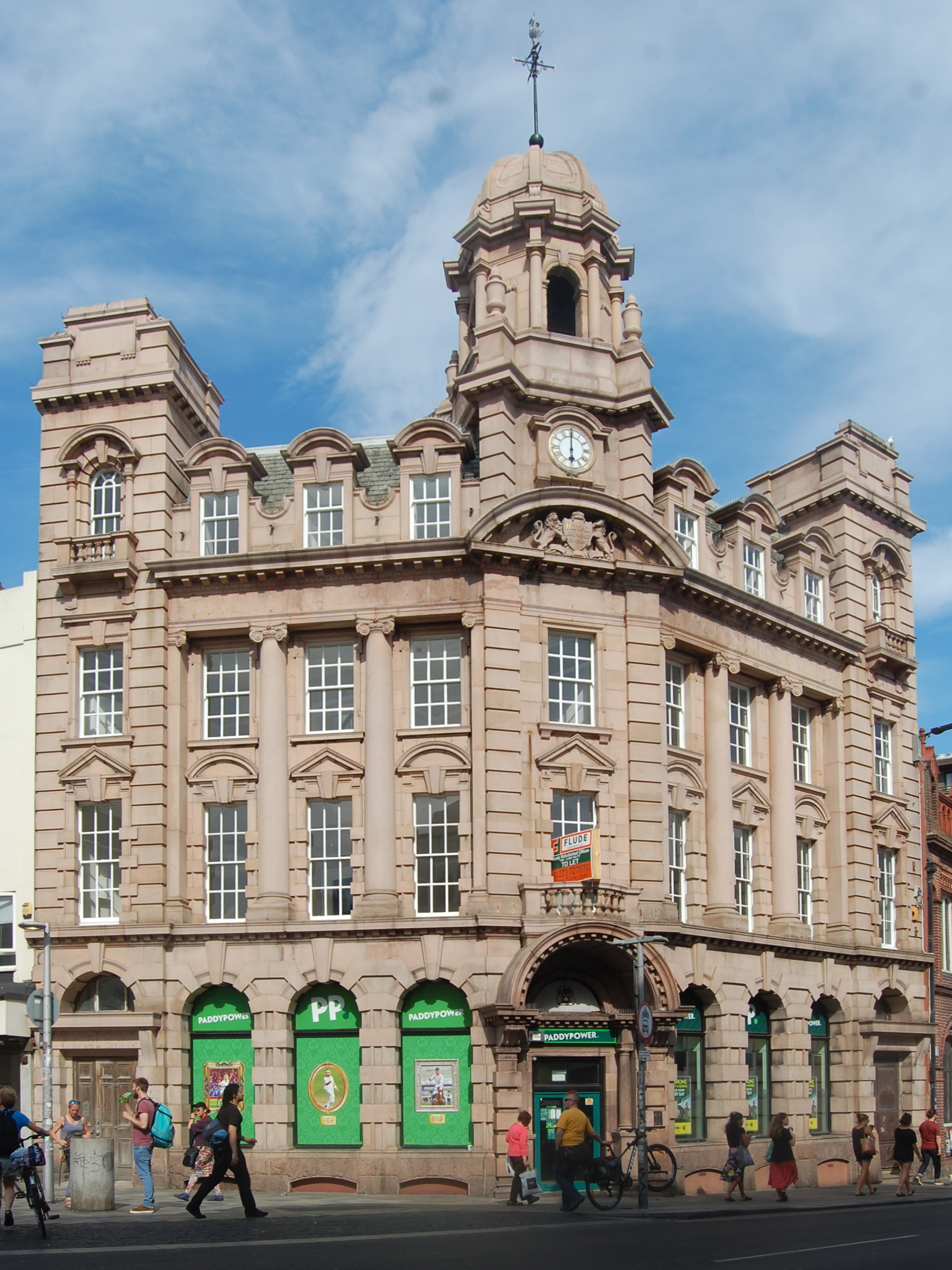
- The building from the west-southwest

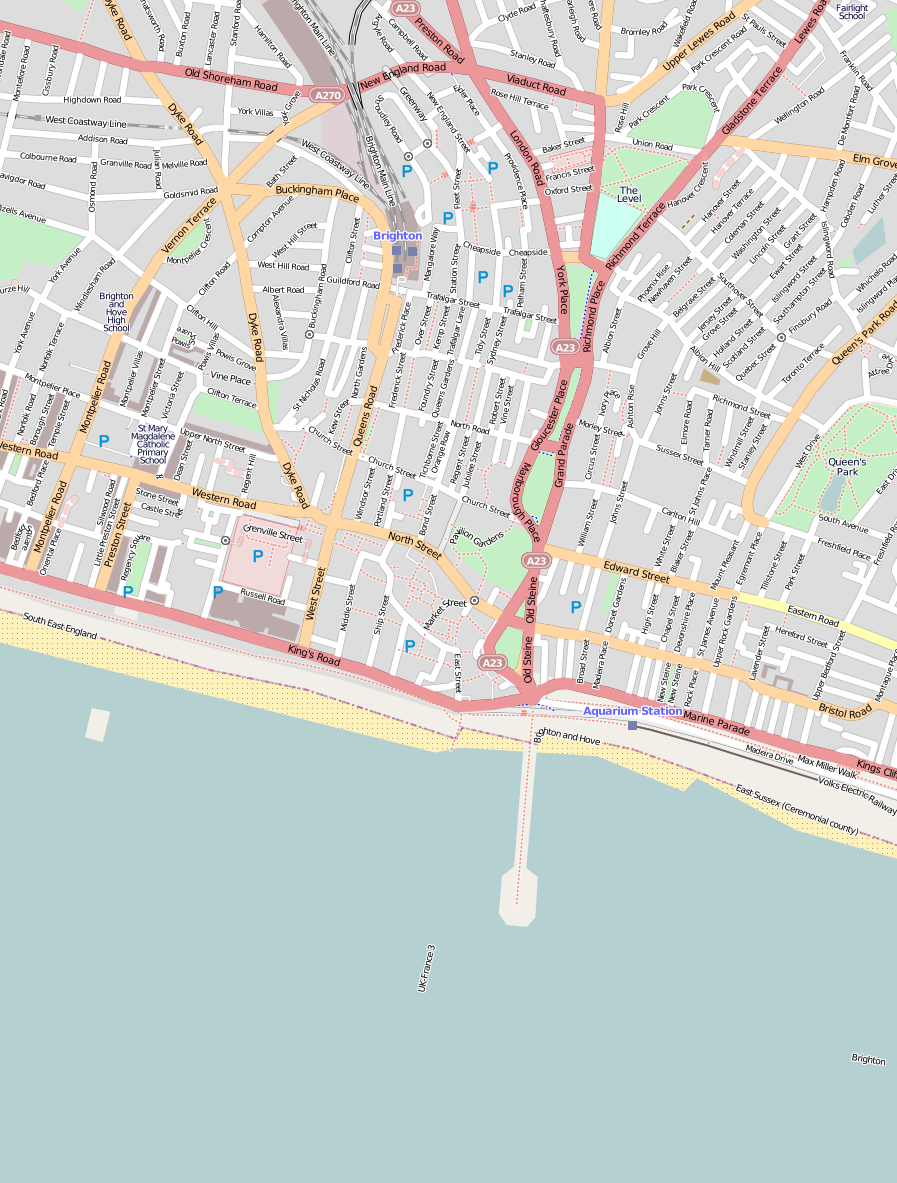
- Location within central Brighton
- 50.8227°N 0.1395°W
- Location: 163 North Street, Brighton, Brighton and Hove BN1 1EA, United Kingdom

History
- Built: 1904
- Built for: Royal Assurance Society

Site notes
- Architect: Clayton & Black
- Architectural style: Edwardian Baroque

Listed Building – Grade II
- Official name: No. 163 North Street
- Designated: 26 August 1999
- Reference no.: 1380622

The building at 163 North Street in Brighton, part of the English coastal city of Brighton and Hove, was erected in 1904 for an insurance company and has since been used as a branch by several banks and building societies. It now houses a bookmaker's shop. The distinctive pink granite Edwardian Baroque-style office, embellished with towers, decorative carvings and a landmark cupola, has been called "the most impressive building" on Brighton's main commercial thoroughfare. One of many works by prolific local architecture firm Clayton & Black, it has been described as their chef d'œuvre. English Heritage has listed it at Grade II for its architectural and historical importance.

== History ==
North Street formed the northern boundary of the ancient fishing village of Brighthelmston, from which the town of Brighton developed. It was part of the main route out of Brighton towards London, so was well placed to develop quickly once the town started to grow in the 18th century. By about 1800 it was considered the main commercial area of Brighton. The first of several road widening schemes was completed in 1879: it cleared most buildings from the north side of the street and encouraged the development of large banks and offices.

The architecture firm Clayton & Black had been based in Brighton since the 1870s, originally at North Street. By the early 20th century they had designed a wide range of buildings in the town and in neighbouring Hove, where they also carried out surveying work. Their portfolio included churches, schools, residential buildings, a convalescent home and a furniture depository, completed in 1904. By this time they were working mostly on commercial buildings, and in 1904 the Royal Assurance Society commissioned them to design a new office on a site next to the Chapel Royal at the junction of North Street and New Road—a prominent corner site. Other banks and financial institutions followed, and the north side of North Street has been "dominated" by them ever since.

From 21 April 1936, the building was shared with a branch of Martins Bank. A weather vane decorated with a liver bird—part of the bank's logo—was added to the roof. The branch closed on 5 March 1957 when a new one was opened elsewhere on North Street. By 1987, the building was occupied by a branch of the Leeds Permanent Building Society. On 1 August 1995, this company merged with the Halifax Building Society and the "Leeds Permanent" brand disappeared; thereafter the branch operated under the Halifax brand. By 2013 the building housed a branch of Metrobet, a bookmaker with several branches in London and southeast England, but in 2020 it was a branch of the Paddy Power bookmaker chain.

== Heritage ==
163 North Street was listed at Grade II by English Heritage on 26 August 1999. This status is given to "nationally important buildings of special interest". As of February 2001, it was one of 1,124 Grade II-listed buildings and structures, and 1,218 listed buildings of all grades, in the city of Brighton and Hove.

The building is within the Valley Gardens Conservation Area, one of 34 conservation areas in the city of Brighton and Hove. This was designated by Brighton Council in 1973 and covers 92.84 acres (37.57 ha).

== Architecture ==
163 North Street has been widely praised for its design. Descriptions include "the chef d'œuvre of Clayton & Black, an ebullient essay in Edwardian Baroque", "an example of Edwardian Baroque at its best: a confident composition" and "the most impressive" of North Street's many banks and offices. The building has a roof of green slate tiles, and the walls are faced entirely in "delicate" pink granite. It occupies the whole New Road/North Street corner, presenting wide façades to both: the nine-window range is arranged as a 4–1–4 composition with the middle set forming an entrance bay at the corner, which is chamfered. This entrance bay has a straight-headed door set in a deep Tuscan-columned porch with a protruding arched pediment and brackets. The building rises to three storeys with an attic storey above (lit by dormer windows); the outermost bays rise one storey higher in the form of small towers, and the entrance bay is five storeys high and topped with an open-sided cupola and weather vane. This tower also has a clock face. The four-storey outer bays have their own entrances set in small porches with arched fanlights. The ground-floor windows are recessed, arched and set in surrounds with deep rustication and large keystones. A cornice between the ground and first floors supports Ionic columns in antis which rise through two storeys. The three bays which form towers are heavily rusticated—the outermost right to the top, and the chamfered entrance bay just at first- and second-floor levels, as far as a flattened semicircular pediment with the Royal Assurance Company's arms and an inscription. Above this is the clock face, then the slightly recessed cupola. Many of the windows have cornices or pediments of different styles.

== See also ==
- Grade II listed buildings in Brighton and Hove: N–O
- Media related to 163 North Street, Brighton at Wikimedia Commons

== Bibliography ==
- Antram, Nicholas; Morrice, Richard (2008). Brighton and Hove. Pevsner Architectural Guides. London: Yale University Press. ISBN 978-0-300-12661-7.
- Brighton Polytechnic. School of Architecture and Interior Design (1987). A Guide to the Buildings of Brighton. Macclesfield: McMillan Martin. ISBN 1-869865-03-0.
- Collis, Rose (2010). The New Encyclopaedia of Brighton. (based on the original by Tim Carder) (1st ed.). Brighton: Brighton & Hove Libraries. ISBN 978-0-9564664-0-2.
- Dale, Antony; Gray, James S. (1976). Brighton Old and New. East Ardsley: EP Publishing. ISBN 0-7158-1188-6.
- Middleton, Judy (2002). The Encyclopaedia of Hove & Portslade. Brighton: Brighton & Hove Libraries.
