= Clayton & Black =

Architects in Brighton, England

Practice information
- Key architects: Charles E. Clayton, Ernest Black, Charles L. Clayton, Kenneth R. Black
- Partners: George Holford (to 1883); John R.F. Daviel (from 1950s)
- Founded: 1876
- Dissolved: c. 1974
- Location: Brighton, United Kingdom
- Coordinates: 50.8214292, -0.1412418

Significant works and honors
- Buildings: Duke of York's Picture House, Brighton; First Church of Christ, Scientist, Brighton; French Convalescent Home, Brighton; Gwydyr Mansions, Hove; Hove Fire Station; King and Queen pub, Brighton; Royal Assurance Society offices, Brighton
- Projects: Extensions to Brighton College, Brighton Friends Meeting House, Royal Albion Hotel; Remodelling of Theatre Royal, Brighton

Clayton & Black were a firm of architects and surveyors from Brighton, part of the English city of Brighton and Hove. In a career spanning the Victorian, Edwardian and interwar eras, they were responsible for designing and constructing an eclectic range of buildings in the growing town of Brighton and its neighbour Hove. Their work encompassed new residential, commercial, industrial and civic buildings, shopping arcades, churches, schools, cinemas and pubs, and alterations to hotels and other buildings. Later reconstituted as Clayton, Black & Daviel, the company designed some churches in the postwar period.

Charles E. Clayton and Ernest Black, their sons Charles L. Clayton and Kenneth Black, and other architects articled to the firm, worked in a range of styles. The "architectural pantomime" of their Tudor Revival King and Queen pub and the elaborate Classical façade of the First Church of Christ, Scientist contrast with their plain Neo-Georgian Barclays Bank branch and the Gothic Revival St Thomas the Apostle's Church. Elsewhere in Brighton and Hove, they designed buildings in the Flemish Renaissance, Arts and Crafts, Art Deco and François Premier Revival styles. Many Clayton & Black buildings have been awarded listed status by English Heritage in view of their architectural importance—including their pink Baroque-style office for the Royal Assurance Society, described as their chef d'œuvre.

== Company history ==
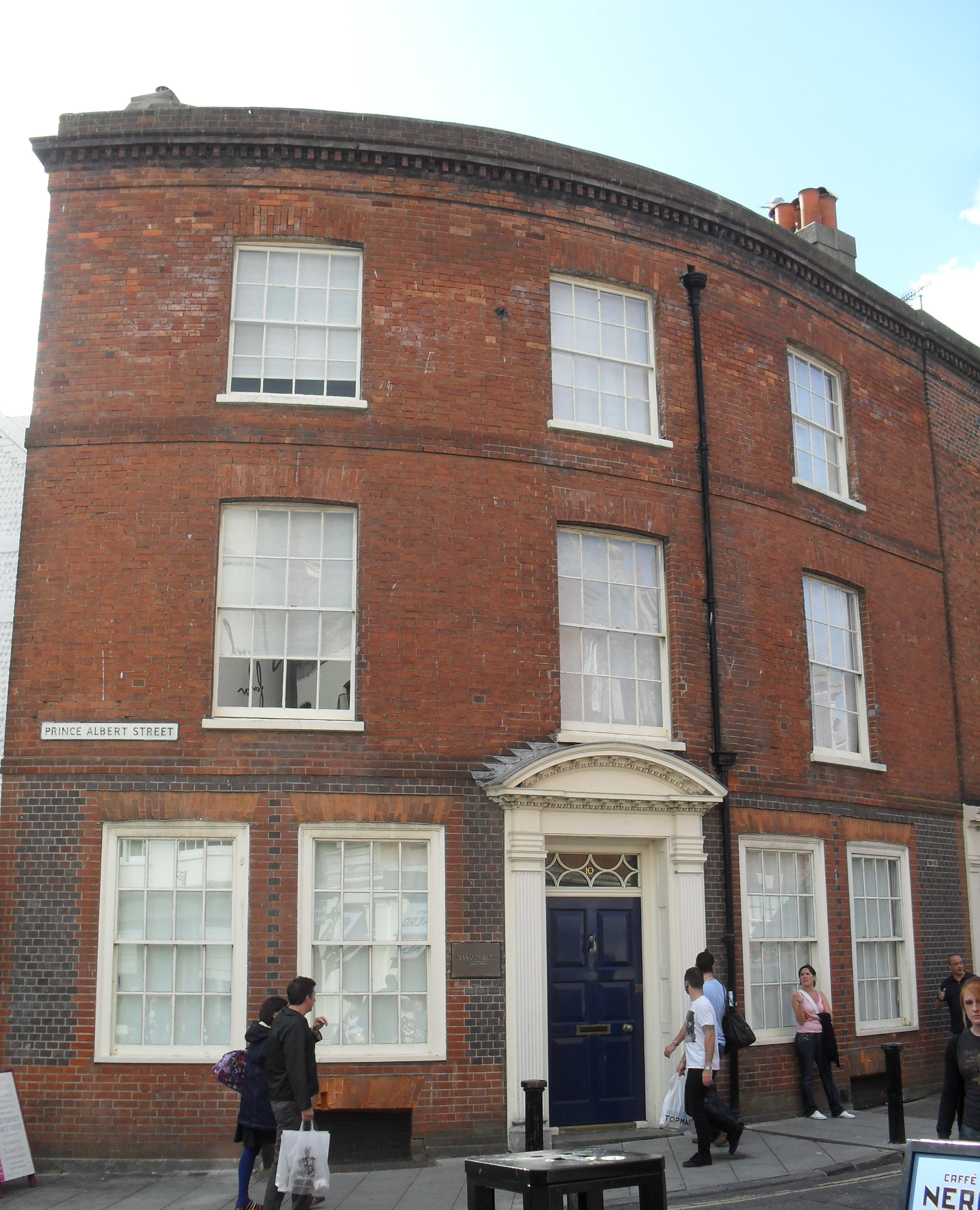
10 Prince Albert Street in The Lanes was the firm's base from 1904.

Charles Edward Clayton was born in 1853 in Brighton, and Ernest Black, son of the Brighton coroner, was born there two years later. Clayton entered architectural practice in 1876 with George Holford; both studied under the Brighton architect Thomas Simpson. Black joined six years later, and Holford's involvement ceased the following year. Charles L. Clayton and Kenneth R. Black, sons of the original partners, joined later; the name "Clayton & Black" was maintained, although "Clayton, Black & Partners" was sometimes used as well. Charles E. Clayton, who made his home in Edburton near Brighton and who was mainly responsible for church-related commissions, died in 1923; Ernest Black had died six years earlier. Other partners joined the firm later in the interwar period as its success grew, but the final name change did not occur until John René Francis Daviel joined in the early 1950s and became the main driving force: thereafter the company was known as "Clayton, Black and Daviel". The last record of the company was in 1974. Several other architects were articled to the firm at various times, such as Thomas Handy Bishop (between 1892 and 1893). John Owen Bond (between 1900 and 1903), Bernard Jessop (1908), and George Stanley Hudson. M.G. Alford joined in the 1960s, during the Clayton, Black and Daviel era.

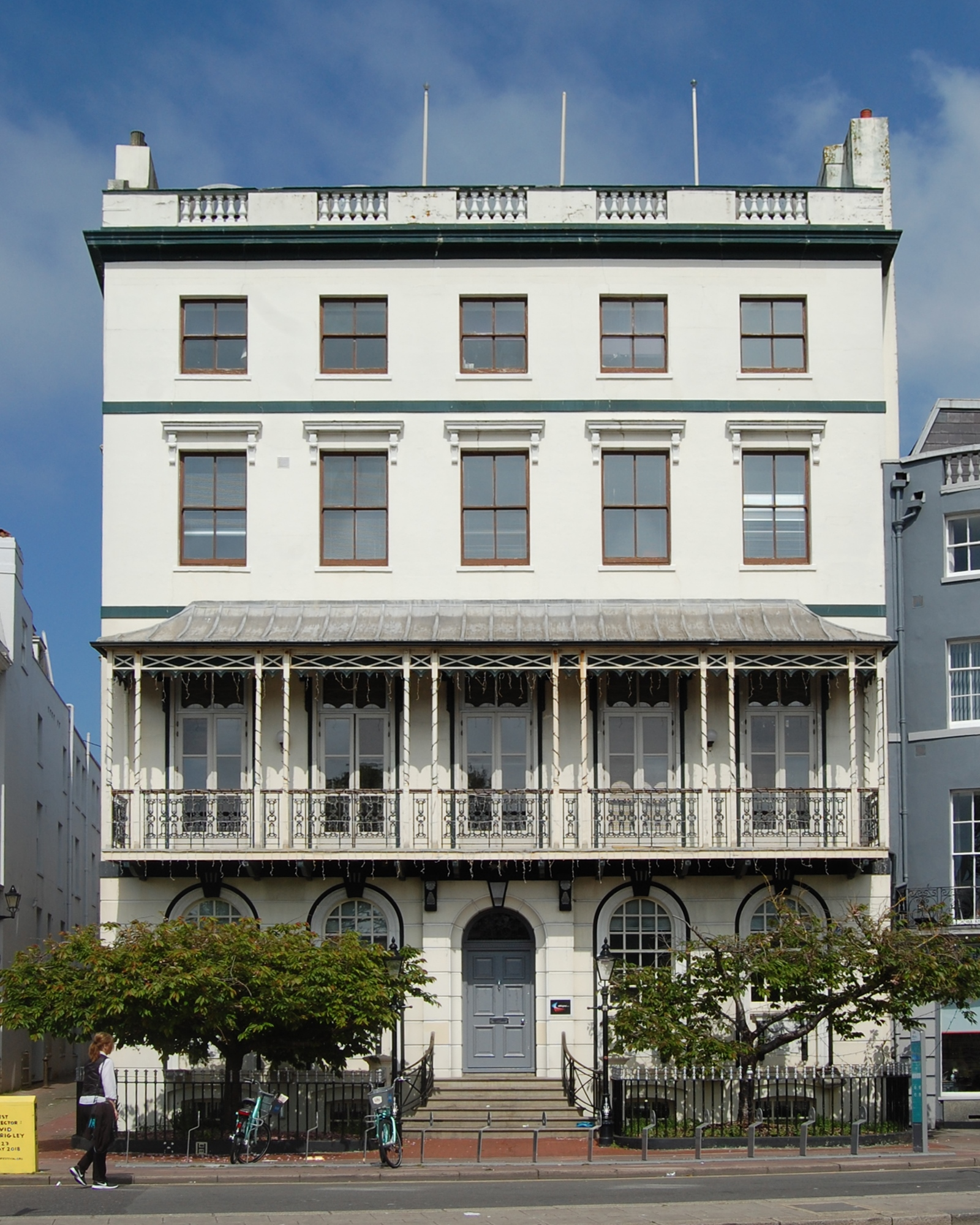
Clayton & Black's first recorded work was their rebuild of Blenheim House in Brighton's Old Steine.

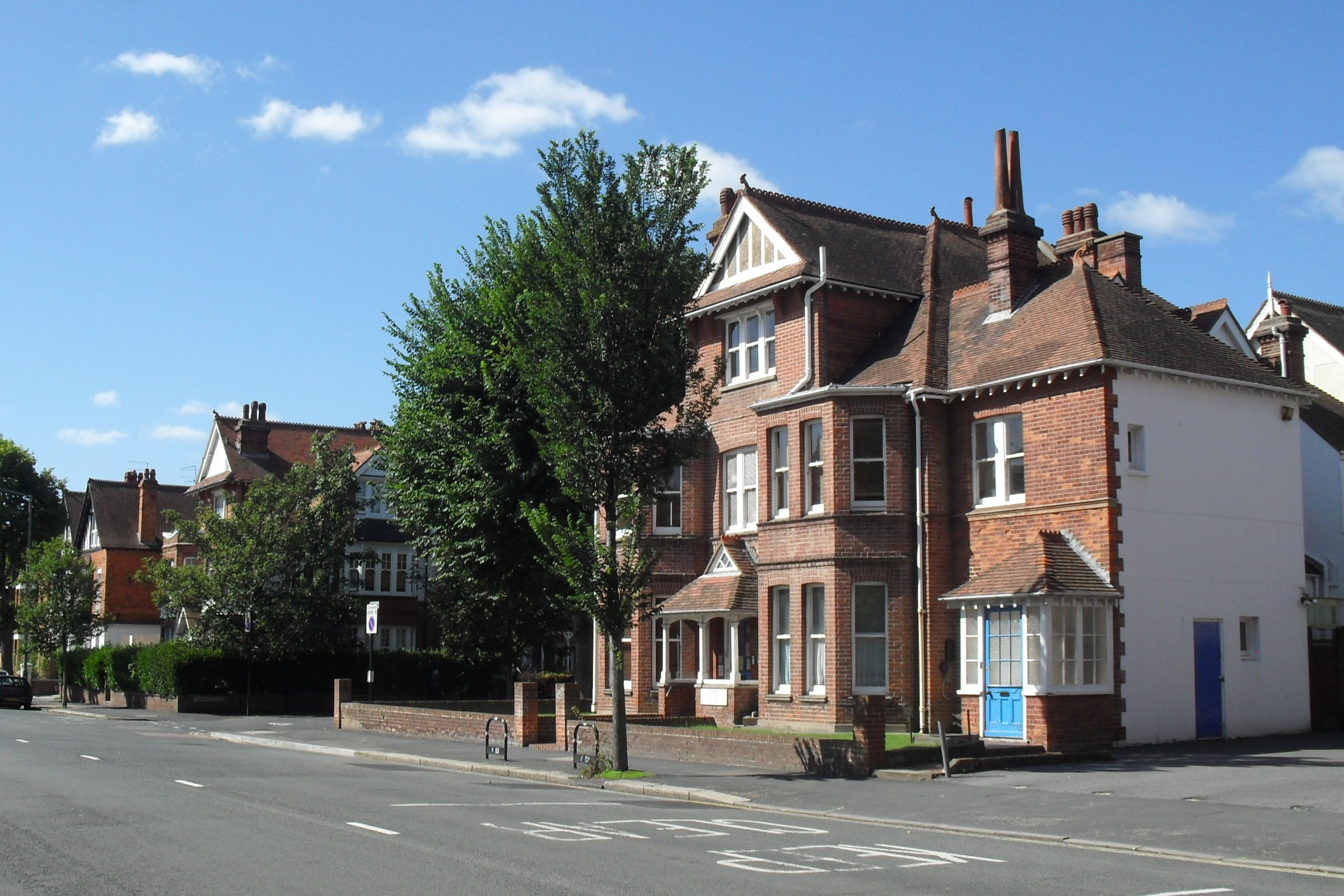
From 1895, the firm was responsible for a large area of expansive red-brick housing in Hove.

Brighton and Hove were unusual among British towns and cities for the extent to which locally based architects received commissions for major buildings. Clayton & Black was the most prolific of three Brighton-based firms which between them designed dozens of residential, commercial, ecclesiastical and other buildings in the late 19th and early to mid-20th century in the rapidly growing towns. The others were Thomas Lainson (Lainson & Sons) and John Leopold Denman (Denman & Son). Clayton & Black were the most "solidly commercial" of these, and commercial buildings represent their best work.

The practice was recorded at 152 North Street in Brighton in 1890. From 1904, the firm were based in offices at 10 Prince Albert Street—one of a terrace of four buildings on a road built in 1842 to improve links within The Lanes, the ancient heart of Brighton. Sources disagree on whether the building, which is Grade II-listed, is late 18th-century or contemporary with the street, but Clayton & Black remodelled it extensively when they took over, giving it a firmly Georgian appearance.

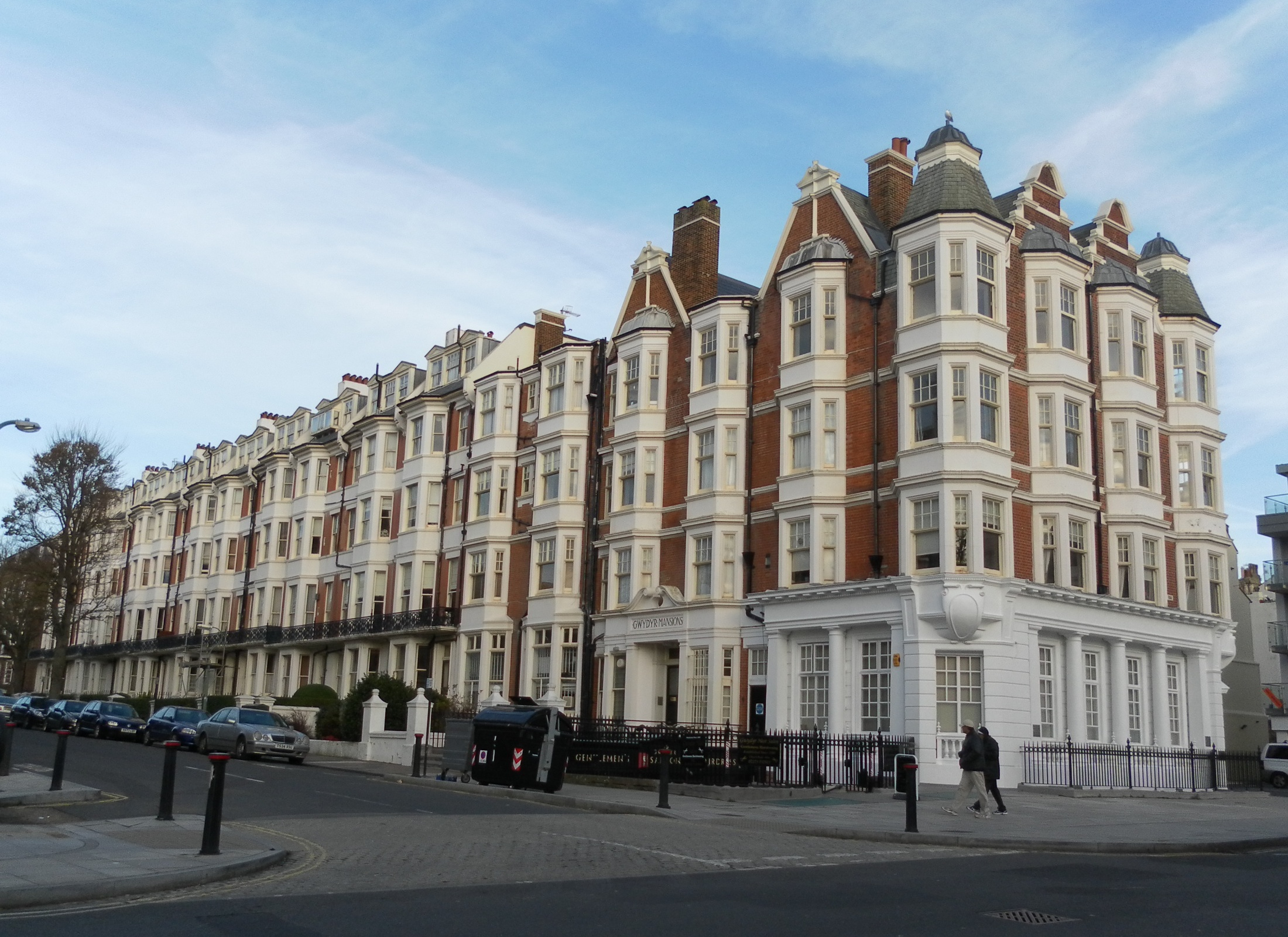
Gwydyr Mansions (1890) are in the Flemish Renaissaince style.

The first recorded commission for the firm, around 1875–76, was a complete rebuild of Blenheim House (56 Old Steine) in the centre of Brighton. This was one of several old buildings (along with Marlborough House and Steine House) on the west side of Brighton's first fashionable area, the low-lying grassland of Old Steine. In 1876–77, they extended the Brighton Friends Meeting House, built for Quakers in 1805, and in 1894 they extended and comprehensively redesigned the town's famous Theatre Royal, partly in response to new fire regulations. Much of the firm's early work, though, consisted of housebuilding and surveying in the rapidly developing residential town of Hove, a comfortable middle-class counterpoint to the neighbouring resort of Brighton, in which "a certain gentility prevails" in the spacious streets of finely detailed houses. The landmark Gwydyr Mansions at the bottom of Holland Road, a Flemish Renaissance red-brick and ashlar block of mansion flats with integral facilities such as a restaurant and barber shop, date from 1890. Their next work was in Lansdowne Road (1891), Furze Hill (1893), Holland Road (1895: a studio) and Portland Road (1895: several pairs of semi-detached houses and villas). On Holland Road, a major north–south route, they were also responsible for shops, flats and a religious institute in 1898, a factory for Green & Company in 1911, and a set of garages in 1925. From 1895, they were the main surveyors to the Vallance Estate, a development of high-class Domestic Revival/Queen Anne-style red-brick housing on land owned by the Vallance family. In particular, they were engaged at Pembroke Crescent and Pembroke Avenue, part of the Pembroke & Princes conservation area, almost continuously between 1895 and 1906, and at Vallance Road and Vallance Gardens until 1907. At the same time, but back in Brighton, they built a seaside convalescent home for French nationals who were patients at the French Hospital in London. The distinctive turreted structure is now Grade II-listed. Also contemporary were a veterinary surgery on Goldsmid Road and the small terraced streets between Old Shoreham Road, Sackville Road and the railway line—Frith, Poynter, Landseer, Prinsep and Leighton Roads. Between 1892 and 1900 they also built up Sackville Road, another important north–south route, with shops, houses and the vicarage of St Barnabas' Church. In 1894–97, they were responsible for a large complex of school buildings in the Aldrington area of Hove, and in 1900 they designed and built a new hall at the Ellen Street schools in Hove (demolished in 1974)—an elaborate Queen Anne-style building designed in 1877 by Thomas Simpson, under whom Clayton was studying at that time. Also in 1894, they were engaged in Royal Tunbridge Wells in Kent to design a Quaker meeting house.

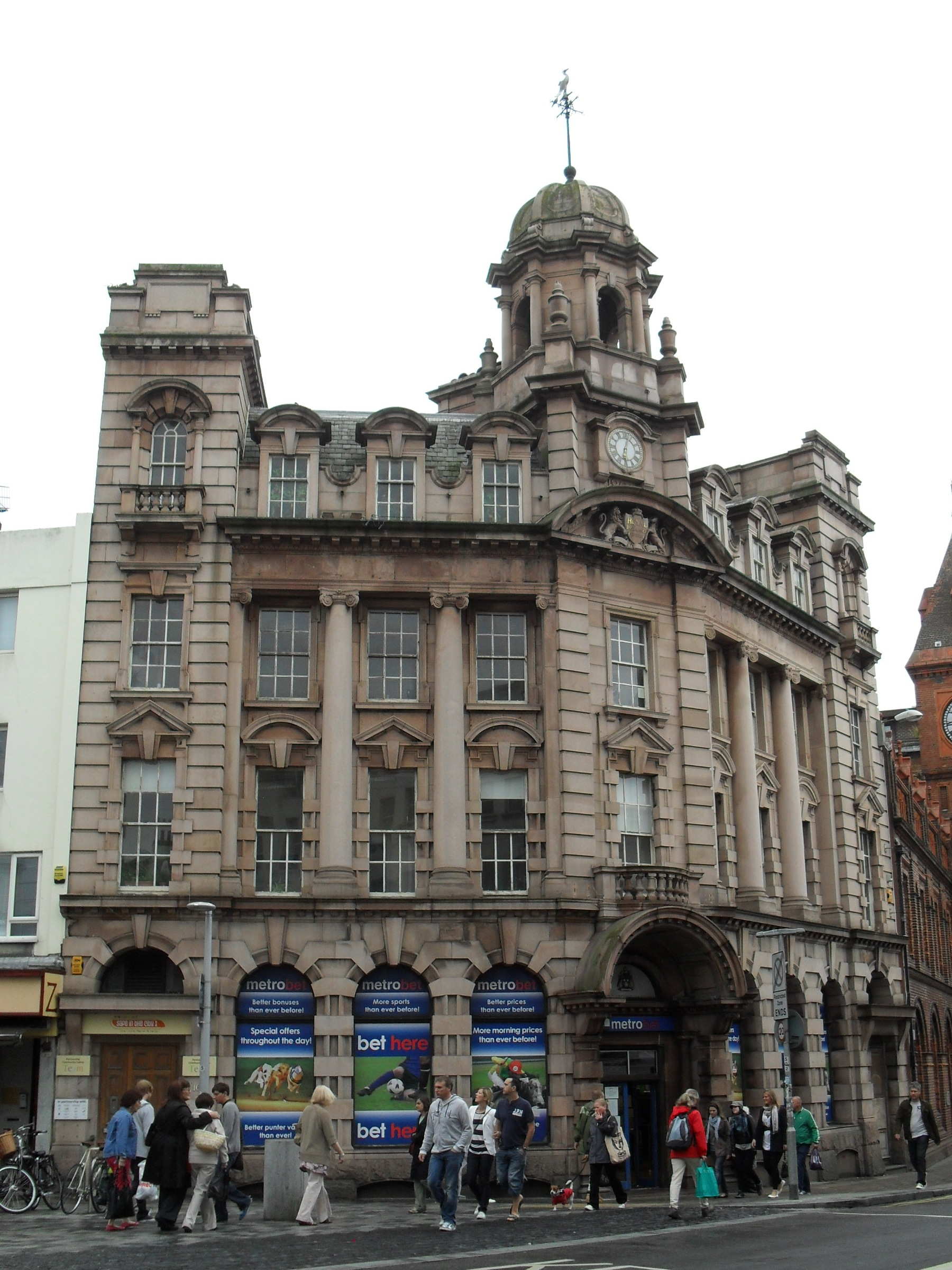
The former Royal Assurance Society office in North Street, Brighton, is a pink granite Edwardian Baroque structure.

Two places of worship followed in the early 20th century: for Baptists, the firm provided a "mission hall" (as it was described in the plan submitted to the borough council) on Lennox Road in the Aldrington area of Hove in 1903; and for the Church of England, they designed St Thomas the Apostle's Church on Davigdor Road in 1906. These were the first examples of commissions for religious buildings which came intermittently throughout the firm's history. From the early 20th century the firm received more and more commissions for commercial buildings, and buildings such as offices and banks characterised the next decades. They designed a "magnificent" furniture depository in Hove for Hannington's department store (completed in 1904), then executed their most celebrated design: a tall, landmark office for the Royal Assurance Society, on a prominent corner site on Brighton's North Street. After making major alterations to their new office in Prince Albert Street, they designed a pub on the main London Road—like many of their buildings, it had a corner turret topped with a dome—in 1905. A year later, they extended the Royal Alexandra Hospital in the Montpelier area of Brighton.

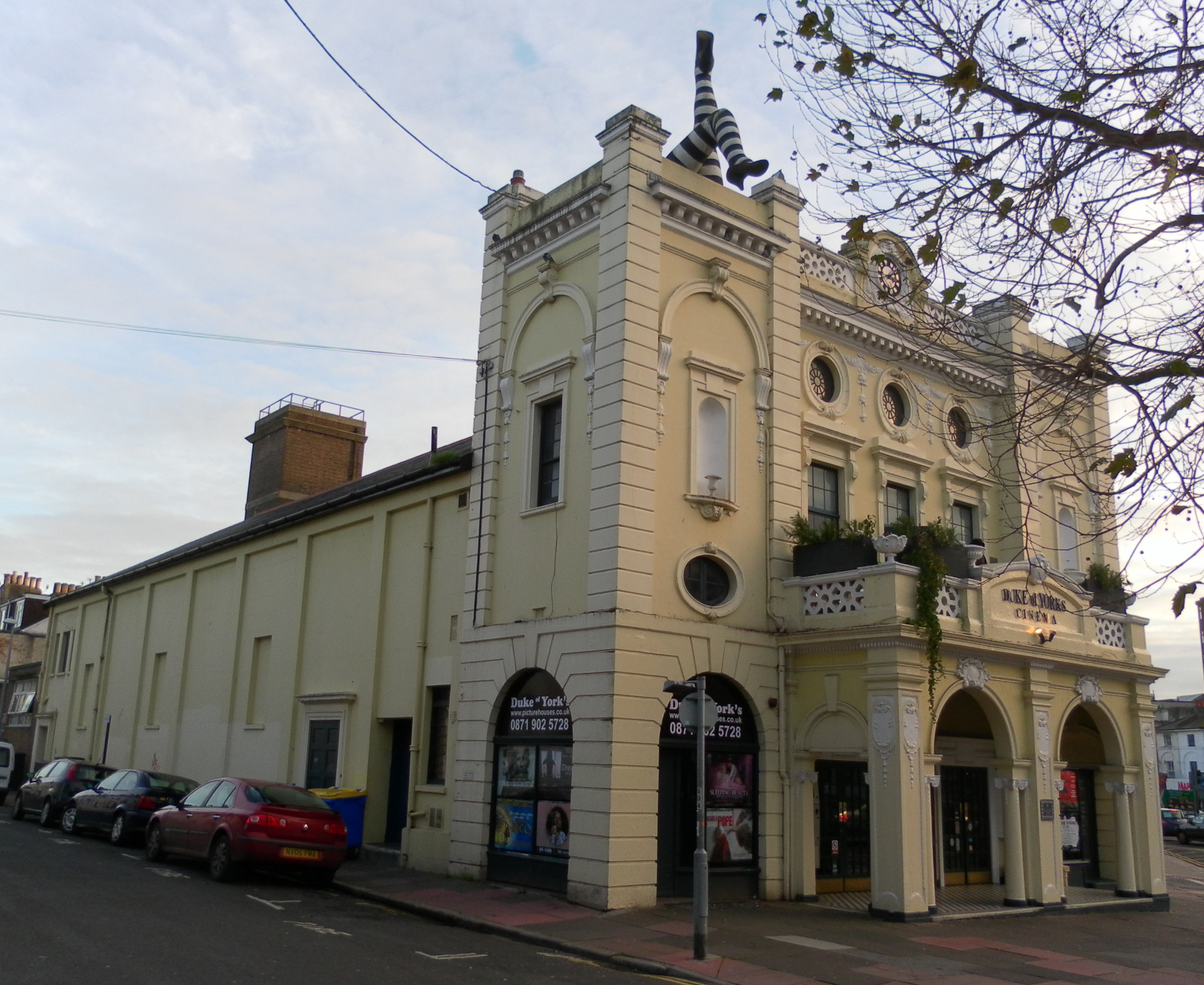
The Duke of York's Picture House was designed in 1910 in the Baroque style.

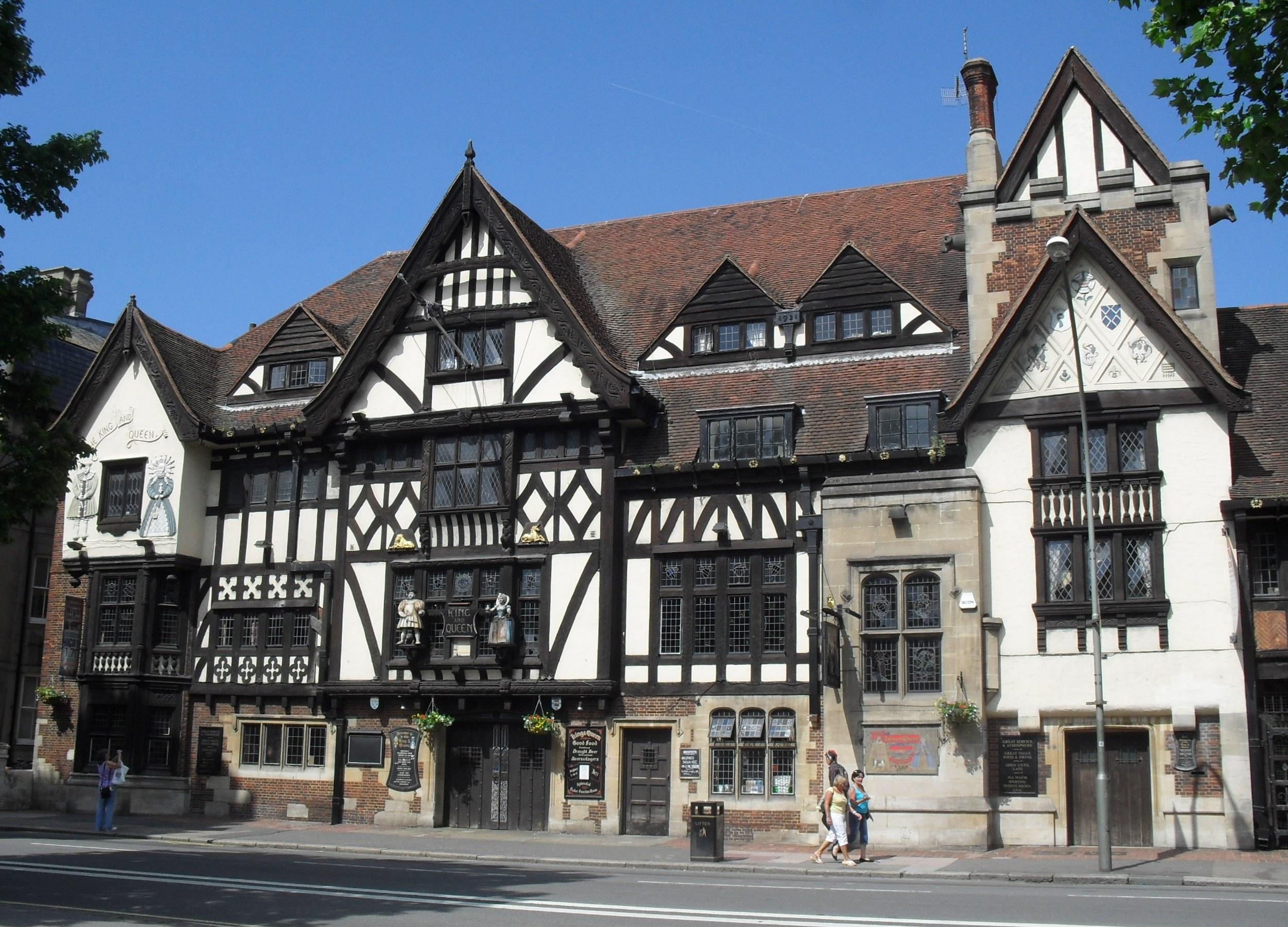
The Tudor Revival King and Queen pub is a distinctive presence on Marlborough Place.

Their work in the second decade of the 20th century encompassed some pioneering buildings: one of England's first cinemas, some of Brighton's earliest council housing (in a "highly attractive" Arts and Crafts style) and a major addition to Brighton's new Palace Pier All of these buildings were started in 1910. The firm then concentrated on housebuilding in Hove for the rest of the decade, taking on work at Lawrence Road (1911), Hove Street (1911), New Church Road (1914) and Kingsway (1915). In 1920 they undertook more work for St Barnabas' Church, whose vicarage they had previously designed: they built a church hall on the east side of Sackville Road, replacing several other halls and institutes in the area. Founded in July 1920, it was completed in 1921 and cost £5,758. The area was subject to postwar urban renewal, and the building was demolished in 1965 in favour of flats with an integral hall.

Later in the 1920s, commissions came for bank branches in Brighton (the National Provincial Bank on North Street, designed by F.C.R. Palmer in 1921–23 but supervised and executed by Clayton & Black, and a Capital & Counties Bank, now Lloyds Bank, on the same street), a new shopping arcade (Imperial Arcade, executed in 1923–24 in a distinctive Art Deco style), Hove's new fire station and a dairy, which they also designed along Art Deco lines. It is one of the few Clayton & Black buildings to have been demolished. One of their most "striking" and memorable commissions then came in 1931, when the owners of the King and Queen pub on Marlborough Place decided to rebuild the 18th-century former farmhouse. The result—an elaborate Tudor Revival "pantomime" with careful facsimiles of typical 16th-century features—was called "a gorgeous flight of architectural imagination" by the Brighton Herald. A plainer, Classical-style building—another insurance company office—followed later in the 1930s, in connection with the widening of West Street in Brighton.

The firm concentrated on churches after World War II, when John R.F. Daviel joined the firm. New Anglican churches for two recently built housing estates, Hollingdean and Mile Oak, were provided in 1954 and 1967 respectively. The Church of the Good Shepherd at Mile Oak was provided on the initiative of the Sussex Churches Campaign. The firm was still in business in 1974; their last recorded work was an extensive restoration of Christ Church in Sayers Common, a village north of Brighton. Daviel was responsible for this work.

== Summary of works ==
=== New buildings ===
Gwydyr Mansions, Holland Road, Hove (1890)

Named after Peter Drummond-Burrell, 22nd Baron Willoughby de Eresby, who at the time of his visits to Hove's Brunswick estate in the 1820s was the 2nd Baron Gwydyr, these were built on the initiative of the Holland Road Baptist Church's pastor. Wealthy people were expected to occupy the building: the 50 flats each had a room for a servant. From the start it had a 60-seater residents' restaurant and a basement barber shop. The latter is still in operation and was refitted in vitrolite in 1936. The building has bands of red brick and ashlar, oriel and canted bay windows, corner turrets, expansive gables and an entrance set between Tuscan columns and below a pediment.

Quaker meeting house, Grosvenor Road, Royal Tunbridge Wells (1894)

A "handsome" Domestic-style building with some 17th-century overtones, this red-brick and Bath stone meeting house was built for the Quaker community in Royal Tunbridge Wells. The work cost £1,824.

French Convalescent Home, De Courcel Road, Brighton (1895–1898; Grade II-listed)

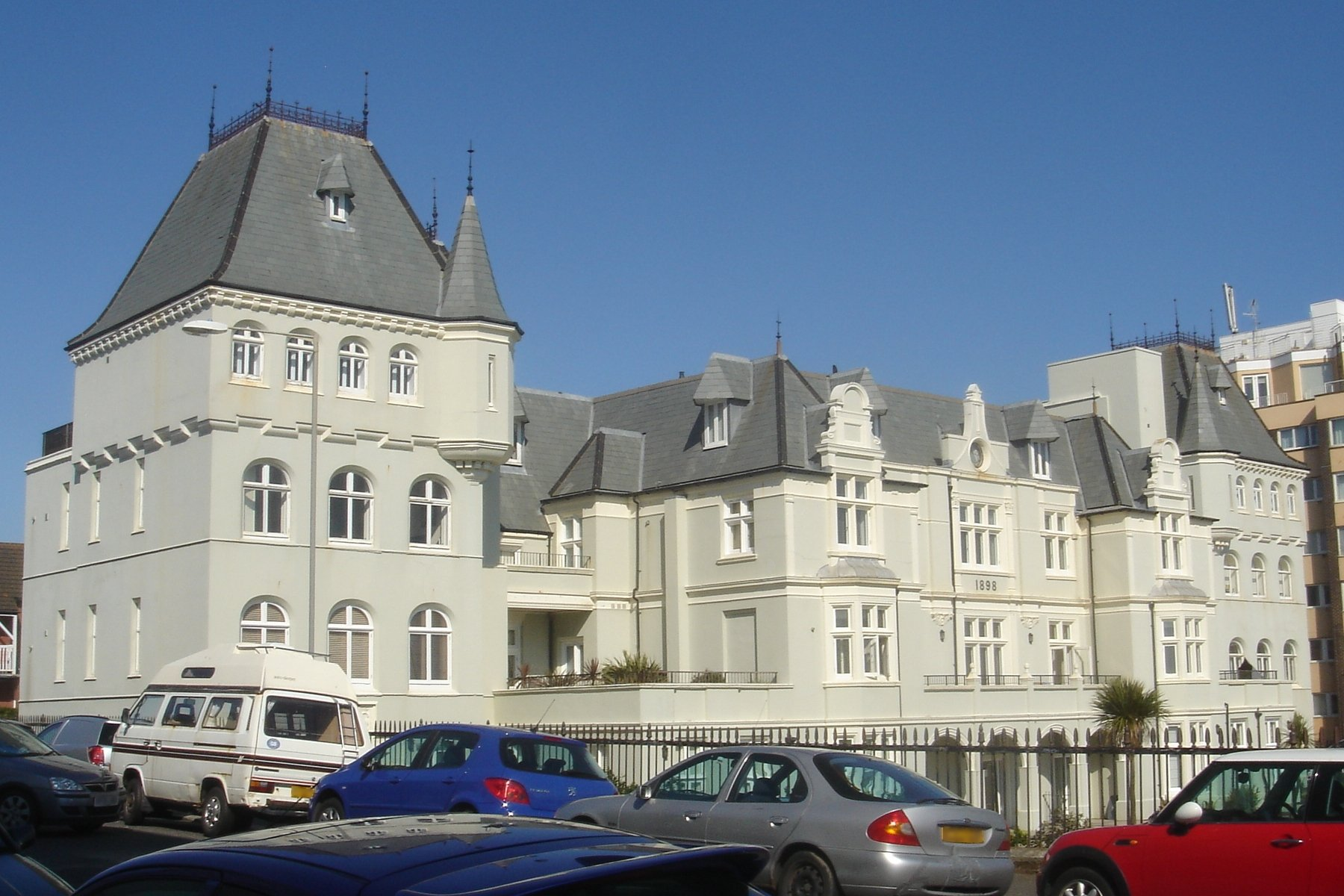
The French Convalescent Home on Brighton seafront resembles a château.

Built at Black Rock on behalf of the French government, this building's curious French Renaissance Revival styling makes it appear "out of place on Brighton's seafront" (which consists almost exclusively of stuccoed Regency-style buildings). Described variously as "drab", "gauche", "chateau-like" and "interesting", it was closed in 1999 and converted into luxury flats. Steep-roofed pavilions with some ironwork were added in 1904 and 1907.

Portland Road Schools, Hove (1897)

When Aldrington was absorbed into the Borough of Hove in 1894, more school accommodation was needed. Clayton & Black were commissioned to execute the School Board's "grandiose plans" for three blocks accommodating about 1,200 children and associated facilities. Limited finances meant the plans had to be redesigned, and the firm provided for a single block for 580 children. An extension was needed by 1904, however, and Clayton & Black were commissioned again. They had to work to a modest budget, and problems with the design of the fireplaces caused Charles Clayton to return in 1907 and carry out more work. The red-brick buildings are still in use under the name West Hove Junior School.

Hannington's Depository (now Montefiore Hospital), Montefiore Road, Hove (1899–1904)

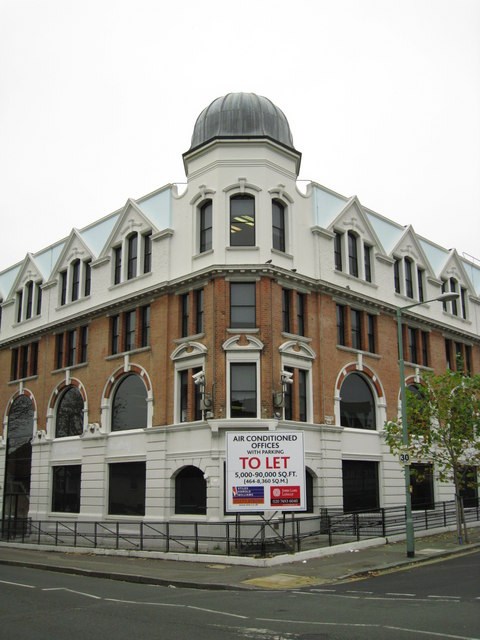
The former Hannington's Depository occupies a prominent corner site in Hove. It now houses the Montefiore Hospital.

Hannington's was Brighton's oldest and most famous department store. The company set up a nationwide removals business and commissioned Clayton & Black to design a furniture repository. The plans were approved in 1899, but the land was not bought until 1901 and construction work apparently continued until 1904. Described as "a magnificent red-brick building embellished with white stone and fine arched windows", it stands on a corner and has a domed turret. The Davigdor Road elevation is 120 feet (37 m) wide, and the building goes back 277 feet (84 m) along Montefiore Road. It was "elegantly converted" by Devereux and Partners in 1972 into an office for Legal & General. In 2012 it was redeveloped as a private hospital by Spire Healthcare.

Royal Assurance Society offices, 163 North Street (1904; Grade II-listed)

Clayton & Black's chef d'œuvre has been called "an ebullient essay in Edwardian Baroque, the "most impressive" building on North Street, and "a confident composition in delicate pink granite". Later used by the Leeds Permanent Building Society and now by a bookmaker, the three-storey building has elevations to North Street and New Road, and a corner bay in which the entrance is set between Tuscan columns and beneath an arched pediment. At each corner is a tower; another topped with a copper dome sits above the entrance bay.

Branch Tavern, London Road, Brighton (1905)

One of several pubs on the stretch of London Road south of Preston Circus, this corner-site building is distinguished by a corner turret of square form with an ogee-shaped cap. The gables are timber-framed. Soon after its construction, the building was occupied by "William Barge, beer retailer".

Electric Bus Garage and Recharging Station, Montague Place, Kemptown (1908; Grade II-listed)

This modest single-storey brick-built garage was built in 1908 for the Brighton, Hove and Preston United Omnibus Company (predecessors of the present Brighton & Hove bus company). It was used to recharge the company's fleet of electric buses, which were introduced from mid-1909. With minimal alteration it later became a standard bus garage and then a garage and repair shop for private motor vehicles.

Duke of York's Picture House, Preston Circus, Brighton (1910; Grade II-listed)

Latterly "a little battered" but retaining much of its original appearance, and restored in 1994 when its ownership changed, this is England's oldest continuously operational cinema. Clayton & Black incorporated some of the walls of the former Amber Ale brewery, which stood on the site, into the new building. The Baroque building has a three-bay façade whose outer sections are formed of slightly taller, fully rusticated towers. A four-arch Palladian/Classical-style arcade runs across the ground floor.

23–30 High Street, Brighton (1910; Grade II-listed)

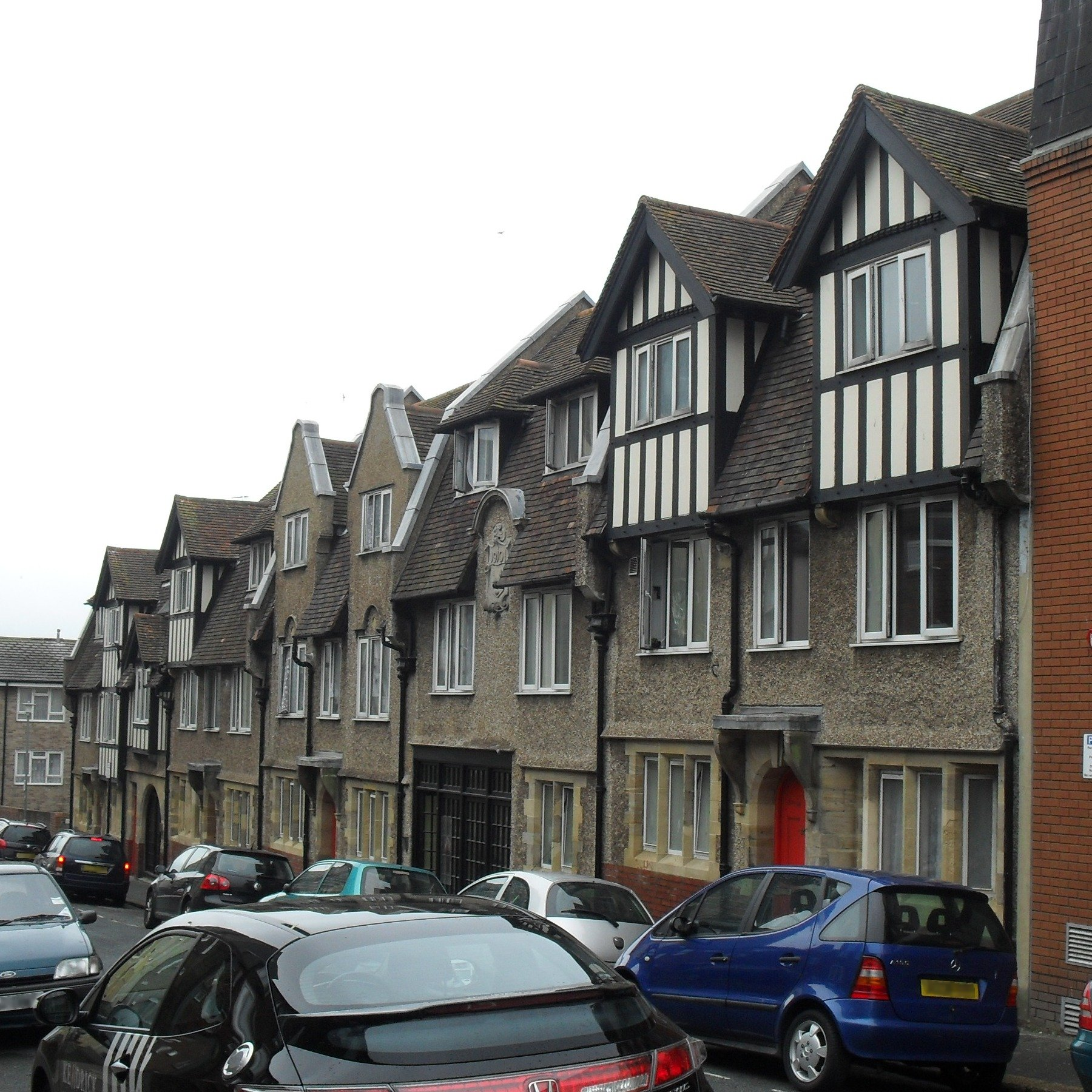
23–30 High Street are "highly attractive" council houses of 1910.

A short terrace of Arts and Crafts-style houses on a sloping site, this "highly attractive" composition was designed for Brighton Corporation as one of the earliest sets of council housing in the town. There are prominent mullions and timbered gables, and the walls are covered with roughcast.

Winter Garden at Palace Pier, Brighton (1910–11)

The landmark Palace Pier, built between 1899 and 1909 by Arthur Mayoh to a design by R. St George Moore, was immediately popular and received various additions over the years. One of the first was the Winter Garden, a round iron-framed pavilion flanked by vaguely Art Nouveau towers. It is now the Palace of Fun.

National Provincial Bank, 155–158 North Street, Brighton (1921–23; Grade II-listed)

This stone building on a corner site, now a bar, was executed by Clayton & Black using a design developed by F.C.R. Palmer. It is in the Louis XVI style, heavily rusticated and intricately carved even on the roofline, where the dormer windows have distinctive architraves. The entrance is set in the chamfered corner and is set below a Diocletian window and a series of bas-reliefs.

Imperial Arcade, Western Road, Brighton (1923–24)

Imperial Arcade in 2023

An arcade in Art Deco style. Part of this building resembles the prow of a ship, this curved shopping arcade is highly visible on its corner site and has strong horizontal lines contrasting with tall vertical windows.

The building was remodelled in 1934 by Garrett & Son.

In 2024, it was purchased by Moretons Investments and a renovation program started.

Hove Fire Station, Hove Street, Hove (1926)

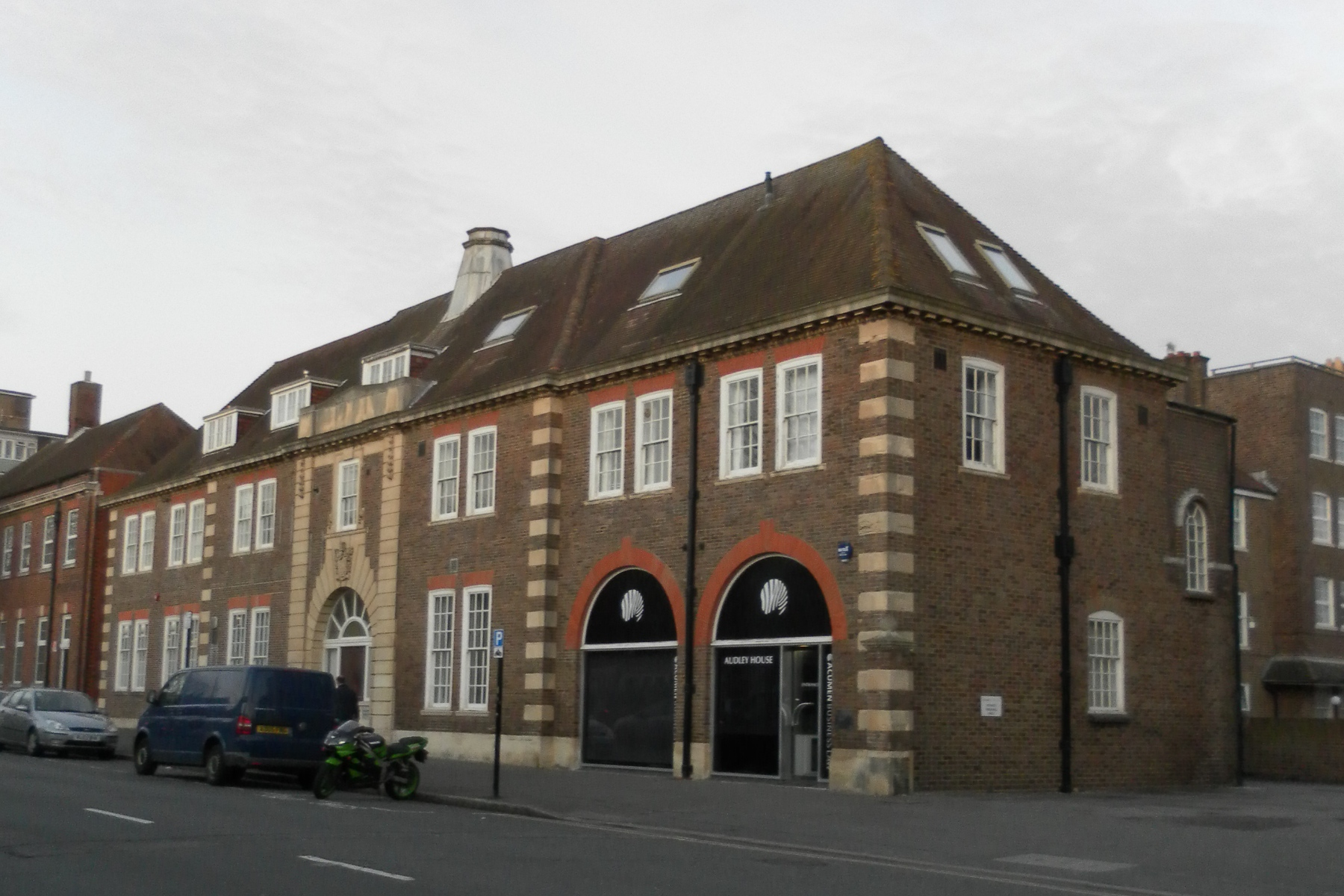
Hove's former fire station dates from 1926.

Hove's new fire station, replacing an outdated facility in George Street, opened on 2 June 1926. James Barnes & Sons of Brighton built it to Clayton & Black's design at a cost of £11,098. It was closed in 1976 when a new station opened elsewhere, and was converted into flats between 1978 and 1981. Clayton & Black's design was "elegant": a "charming" bellcote on the roof bore similarities with that at Hove Manor, demolished soon afterwards, and the fire-engine entrances were arched.

Unigate Dairy and Bottling Plant, Davigdor Road, Hove (c. 1928–30; demolished)

An "impressive" and "interesting" building in the then-popular Art Deco style, this was built for a local dairy firm as a bottling plant. Large plate-glass windows, a glazed entrance framed by scrolls and a pediment-like element and the use of alternating wide and narrow ranges of horizontal windows suggested "a well chosen use of [the Art Deco] vocabulary". In January 1987, English Heritage agreed to grant the building listed status, but withdrew this five months later after finding too many original architectural features had been altered. Unigate Dairies, its owners at the time, sold the 1.3-acre (0.53 ha) site, and the building was demolished.

Lloyds TSB bank, North Street, Brighton (1920s)

Another Edwardian Baroque building, this has a distinctive corner turret and moulded pediment, "but [is] otherwise conservative" with elements of Vernacular architecture.

Knoll School, Old Shoreham Road, Aldrington (1931–34)

This school, built round a quadrangle and serving the new housing of The Knoll estate, opened in two stages: in 1931 and 1934. It closed in 1979 when the boys' department merged with another to form Blatchington Mill School and the girls' department became part of Hove Park School. In 1984 the school buildings, largely unaltered, were reopened as The Knoll Business Centre, a series of small units and workshops for start-up and small-scale businesses.

Atlas Chambers, 33 West Street, Brighton (1930s)

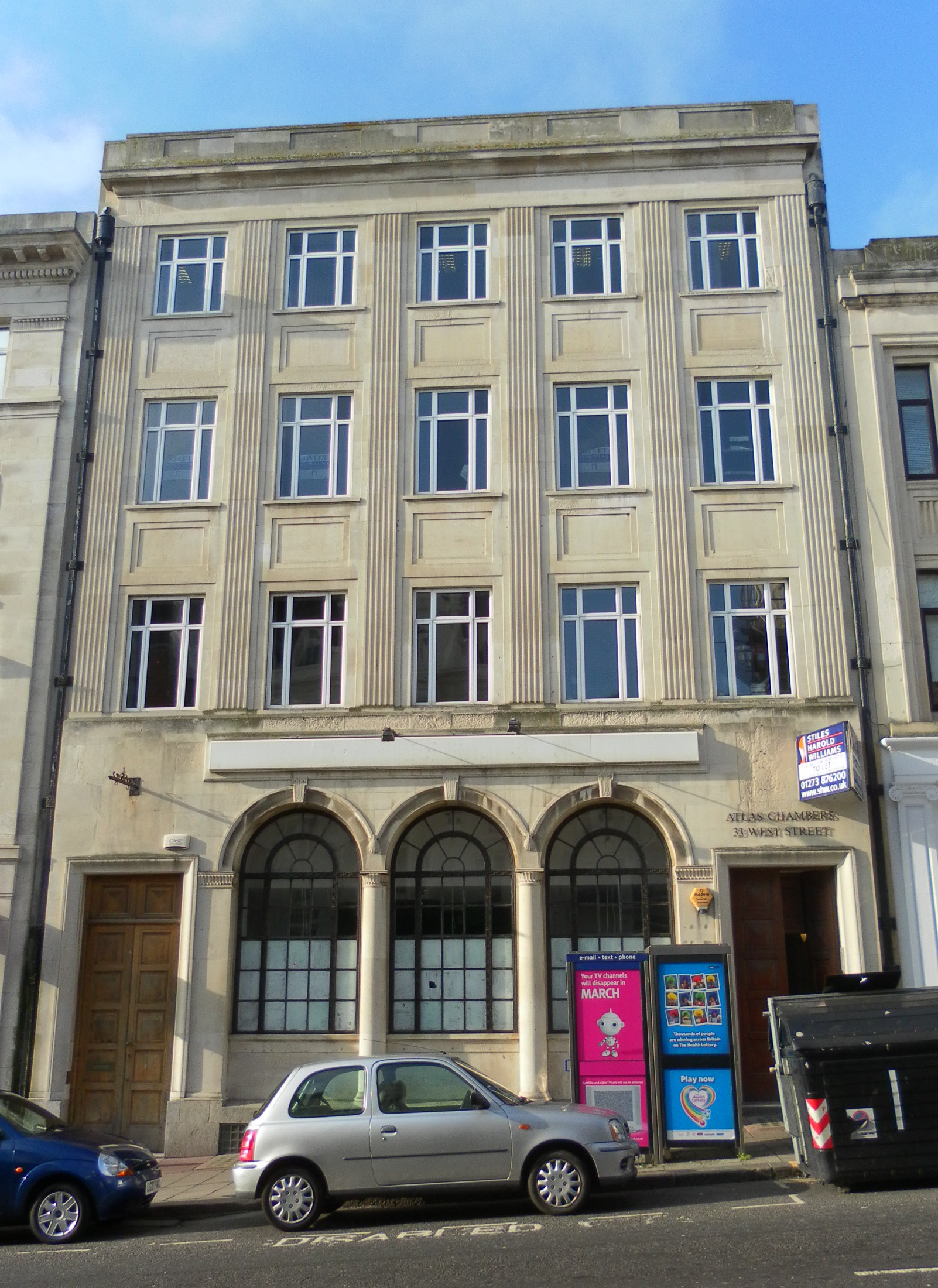
Atlas Chambers are Classical-style offices.

Built as offices for an insurance firm, this is one of a series of "enervating" simplified Classical-style office blocks on the west side of West Street, comprehensively redeveloped in the 1930s due to road widening.

Hove Manor flats, Hove Street, Hove (1940s)

This block of flats was built on the site of the old Hove Manor house, which was demolished in 1936. As originally designed, the brick building had 40 luxury flats, 26 garages at the rear and 10 shops and cafés at ground-floor level.

Barclays Bank, Preston Circus, Brighton

A "routine" exercise in Neo-Georgian architecture, this narrow branch stands between two roads at the major Preston Circus junction. It was squatted in mid-2015 after being vacated by Barclays.

=== Extensions ===
Royal Albion Hotel, Old Steine, Brighton

The hotel was built in 1826, faces inland towards Old Steine and is Grade II*-listed. Clayton & Black's work consisted of "ungainly Edwardian embellishments" to the rear (sea-facing) elevation, including a lounge.

Royal Alexandra Hospital, Dyke Road, Brighton

The hospital was designed in a distinctive Queen Anne style by Thomas Lainson in 1880–81, and closed in 2007 when a new building was opened on another site. Many extensions and alterations were made over the years; Clayton & Black built a series of balconies across the main façade, in the form of a double-height colonnade. Originally open-air, they were later enclosed.

Brighton College, Eastern Road, Brighton

The main building at this "lavish" Gothic Revival complex dates from 1848 and was designed by George Gilbert Scott. Many other architects added to the ensemble over the decades, and Clayton Black & Daviel were responsible for the extension on the east of the campus accommodating School House in the mid-1960s.

=== Remodelling ===
Blenheim House, 56 Old Steine, Brighton (1875–76; Grade II-listed)

This is next to Marlborough House and Steine House on the west side of Old Steine, and is taller and set further forward than both. It was built in the early 19th century, but Clayton & Black's work altered its appearance extensively. More changes were made in the early 20th century. The building now has "a more Regency character" than it did when built.

Market Hall, Station Road, Redhill (1888; demolished)

The Surrey town of Redhill had a market hall from 1860 on the north side of Station Road. Clayton & Black "rebuilt [it] on a grand scale" in 1888. It was demolished in the 1970s during town-centre redevelopment work.

Theatre Royal, New Road, Brighton (1894; Grade II*-listed)

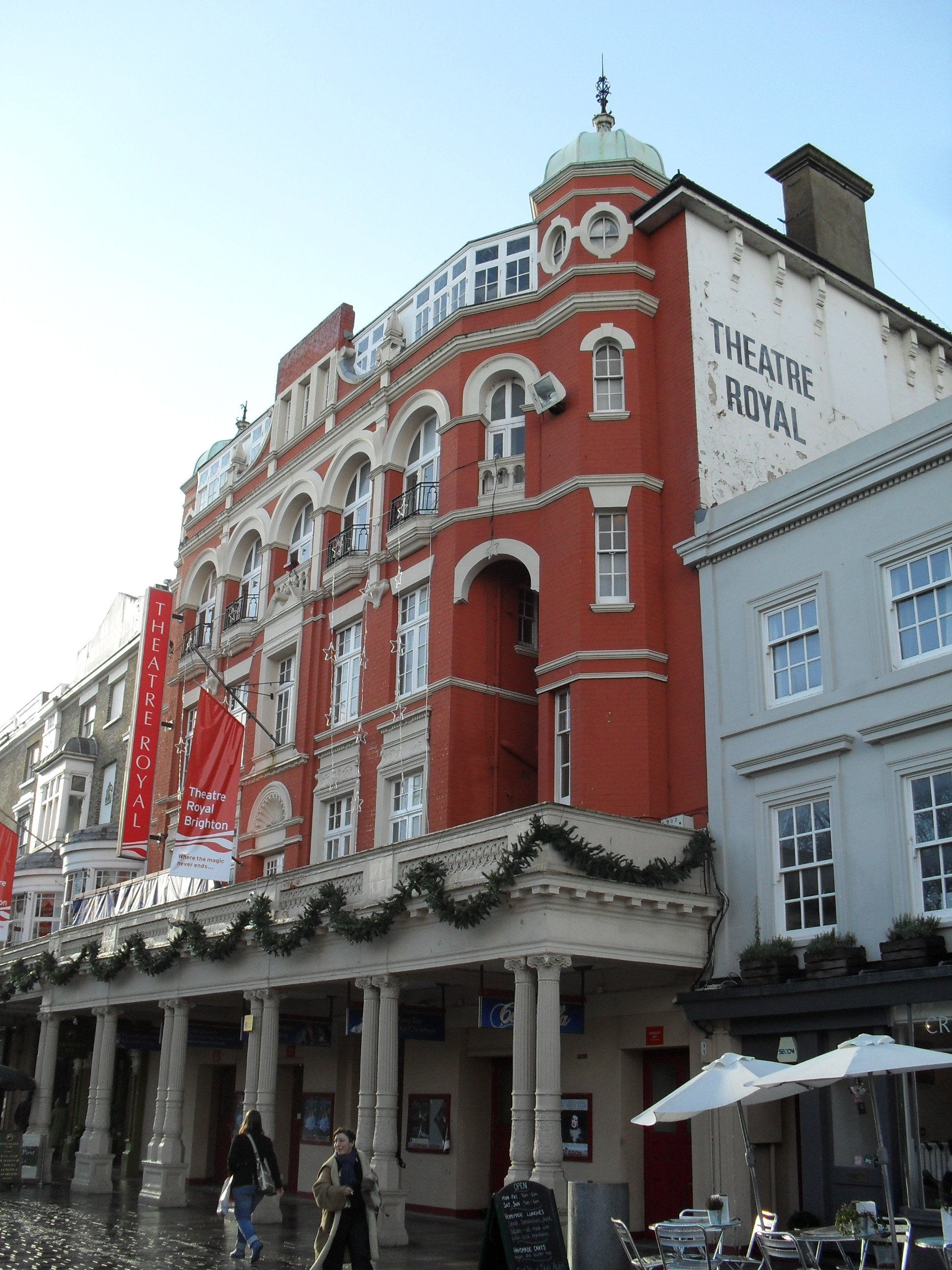
The Theatre Royal was given its present appearance in 1894 when Clayton & Black refronted and extended it.

Opened in 1807, this has been Brighton's main theatre for more than 200 years. A major remodelling in 1866 was followed by Clayton & Black's work, which gave the building its present appearance: they extended and enclosed the conservatory-style façade, added octagonal corner turrets topped with domes, knocked through to the adjacent house and rebuilt it as a box office and foyer, added Corinthian columns and encased the building in bright red brick. The overall appearance is now Jacobean. Originally listed at Grade II, it was upgraded to Grade II* status in May 2012.

Wick Hall, Furze Hill, Hove (1902; demolished)

This house, whose demolition in 1935 was lamented as an example of "Hove's dismal [architectural] record in the 1930s", was designed by Decimus Burton between 1833 and 1840. Clayton & Black were commissioned in 1902 by its owner, Alderman Jeremiah Colman, to extend and substantially alter the house. Flats, also called Wick Hall, now occupy the site.

10 Prince Albert Street, Brighton (1904; Grade II-listed)

This thoroughly Georgian-style three-storey red-brick building with a curved façade was given its present appearance in 1904 when it became Clayton & Black's office. The entrance porch is elaborately Classical, with Tuscan pilasters and a prominent cornice. Inside, the ground floor was completely remodelled; little pre-20th century work remains.

Temple Heights (New Sussex Hospital), Temple Gardens, Brighton (1921)

Like the nearby First Church of Christ Scientist, this was a mid 19th-century stuccoed house altered extensively for its new purpose—a hospital. The site is now partly occupied by flats built in 2003.

Locomotive Inn, Terminus Road, Littlehampton (1920s; demolished)

This former Kemp Town Brewery pub was next to Littlehampton railway station. Clayton & Black rebuilt it in the late 1920s, but it closed early in the 21st century and was knocked down in June 2013.

King and Queen pub, Marlborough Place, Brighton (1931–32; Grade II-listed)

Clayton & Black's ostentatious rebuild borrowed freely from Tudor vernacular elements, both standard and decorative: it features jettying, massive timber lintels, corbels in the form of gargoyles, elaborate carvings and a portcullis. The "wonderful" array of features was enhanced in 1935–36 when another wing was added. Carvings of King Henry VIII and Anne Boleyn were added in the gables, although the inn's name originally referred to King George III and Queen Charlotte.

=== Ecclesiastical work ===
Friends Meeting House, Prince Albert Street, Brighton (1876–77)

This Quaker place of worship was built in 1805 and is Grade II-listed. Some alterations were made in 1850, but Clayton & Black's extensive work of 1876–77 gave it the Victorian appearance it still retains. They added the north wing, which is recessed and has four windows to each of the two storeys, in a similar style to that of the 1850 section.

Mission Hall (Stoneham Road Baptist Church), Lennox Road/Stoneham Road, Hove (1903–04; demolished 2008)

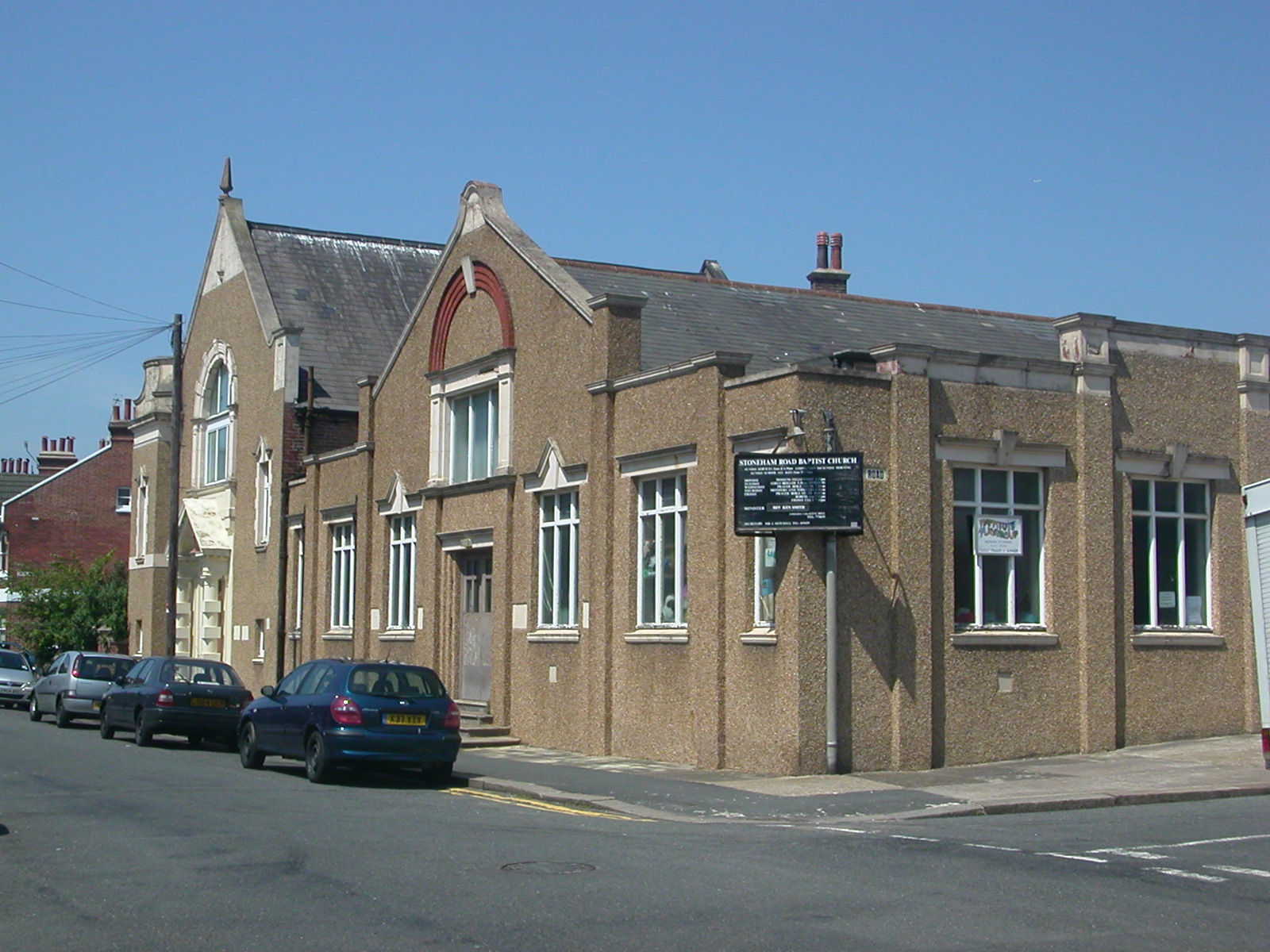
The former Stoneham Road Baptist Church dates from 1903–04.

In 1903, the firm was commissioned to design and build a mission hall in the Aldrington area of Hove. It was the initiative of the Sadler family and Rev. David Davies, an early pastor at Holland Road Baptist Church, who wanted to extend that church's reach further west. The red-brick building was extended in 1931 and was given a roughcast exterior, and took the name Stoneham Road Baptist Church. It closed in 2008, when the congregation moved to another church nearby, and was demolished in that year.

St Thomas the Apostle's Church, Davigdor Road, Hove (1906)

The vicar of St Patrick's Church in central Hove got permission in 1899 to erect a tin tabernacle in this rapidly developing residential area, and a gift of land enabled a permanent church to be built. Clayton & Black's design was based on that of St Mary of Eton's Church (1880) in Hackney Wick, London. The building is Early English/Decorated Gothic Revival in style, of red brick and stone with an unaisled nave and a crypt. There is heavy buttressing inside and out. The church was closed in 1993, sold to the Coptic Orthodox Church of Alexandria and rededicated to St Mary and St Abraam.

First Church of Christ, Scientist, Montpelier Road, Brighton (1921)

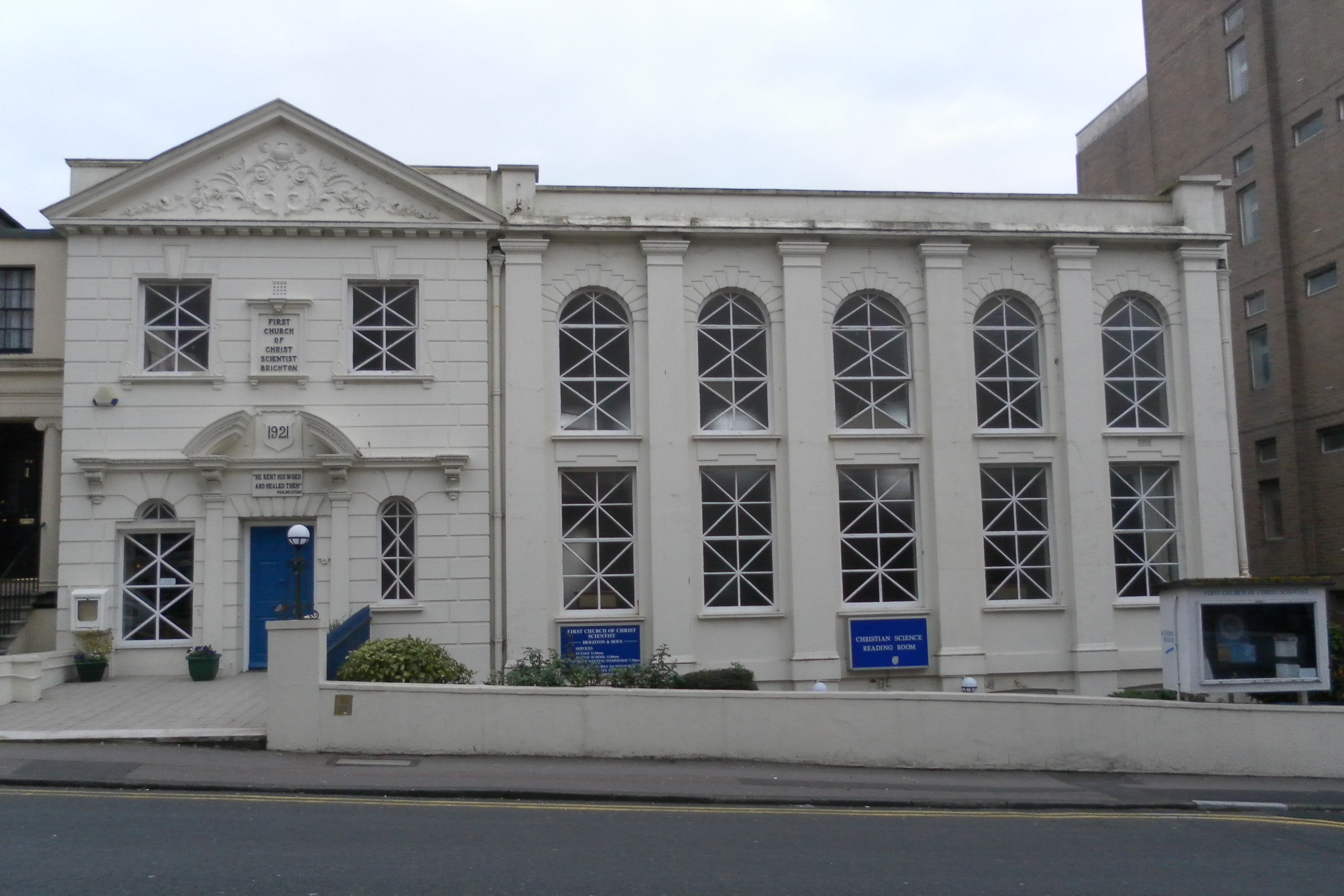
Clayton & Black converted a house into the First Church of Christ, Scientist in 1921.

Near Montpelier Terrace in the Montpelier suburb of Brighton, this building was originally a private house—one of many Italianate/Regency-style houses built in the high-class residential area in the mid-19th century. A "notable" house, it continued in residential use until Clayton & Black converted it into a church in 1921. They kept many features intact, but gave the building a new stucco façade topped by a "richly decorated pediment". The interior is galleried.

St Richard of Chichester's Church, The Crossway, Hollingdean (1954)

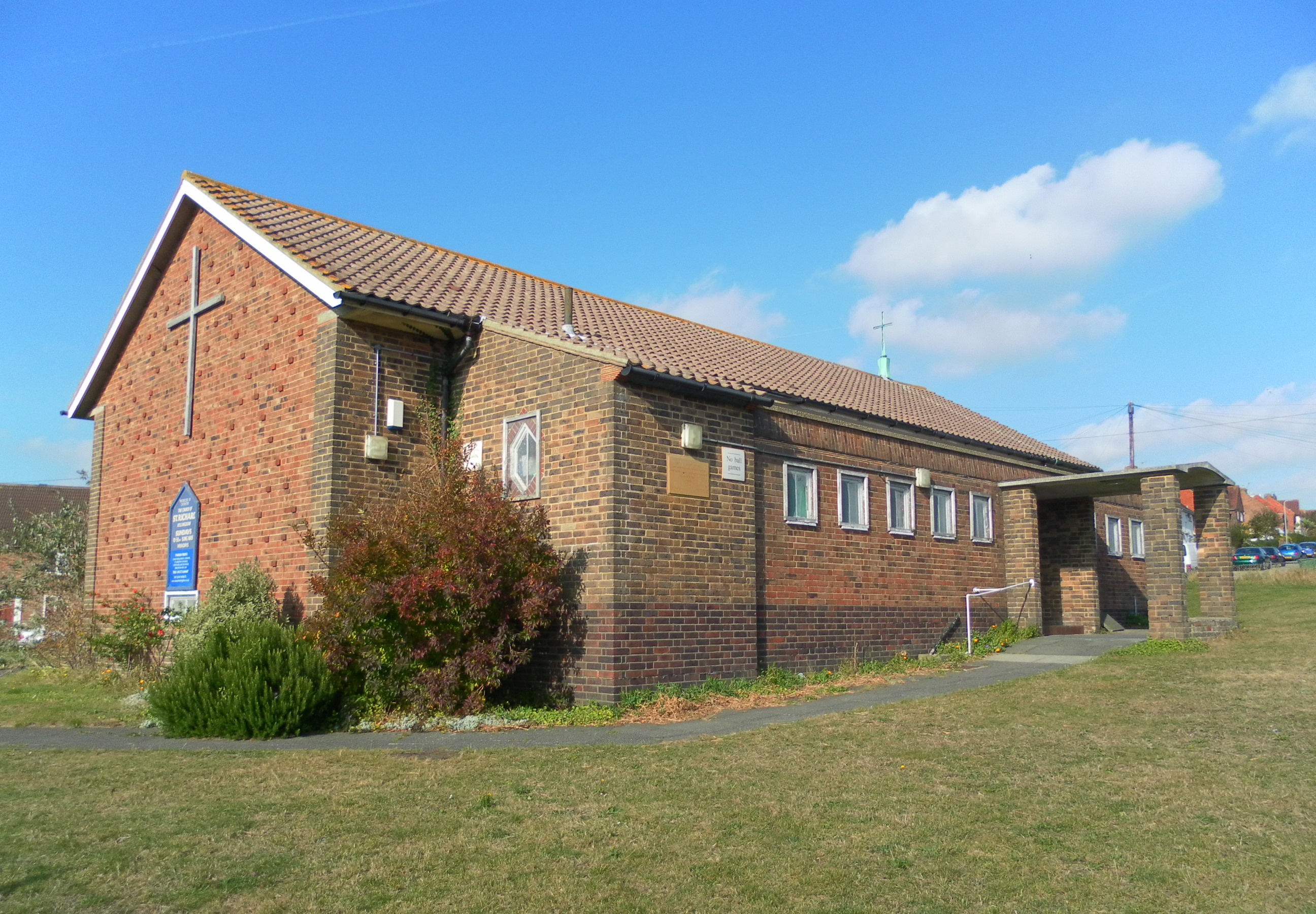
St Richard of Chichester's Church (1954) is a simple brick hall.

After the firm was reconstituted as Clayton, Black and Daviel, it was commissioned by the Diocese of Chichester to design Anglican churches for two of the present city's 20th-century suburbs. In 1954, they built a small brown-brick hall-style church on the Hollingdean estate. St Richard of Chichester's Church was a chapel of ease to the nearby St Matthias' Church.

Schoolrooms at Copnor Methodist Church, Copnor, Portsmouth (1957)

Working as Clayton, Black and Petch, the firm designed a schoolroom extension (the Wesley Rooms) at this 1930s church in suburban Portsmouth.

Church of the Good Shepherd, Stanley Avenue, Mile Oak (1967)

In 1967, the temporary tin church on the Mile Oak estate (opened in 1936) had to be replaced. The firm's architect M.G. Alford, working under the Clayton, Black and Daviel name, designed a distinctive Modernist building: it had a sharply angled roof with six tall windows in the vertical face, and was of brown brick. The Church of the Good Shepherd was parished in 1994, before which it was a chapel of ease to St Nicolas Church, Portslade.

Miscellaneous restorations

Work was undertaken under the firm's name, by various combinations of partners, at the following Anglican churches in Sussex:

- St Mary the Virgin Church, Aldingbourne (1889 and 1904)
- Holy Trinity Church, Poynings (1897)
- Church of the Transfiguration, Pyecombe (1897–98)
- St Andrew's Church, Steyning (1907)
- Christ Church, Sayers Common (1975)

== See also ==
- Buildings and architecture of Brighton and Hove
