= First Church of Christ, Scientist (Brighton) =

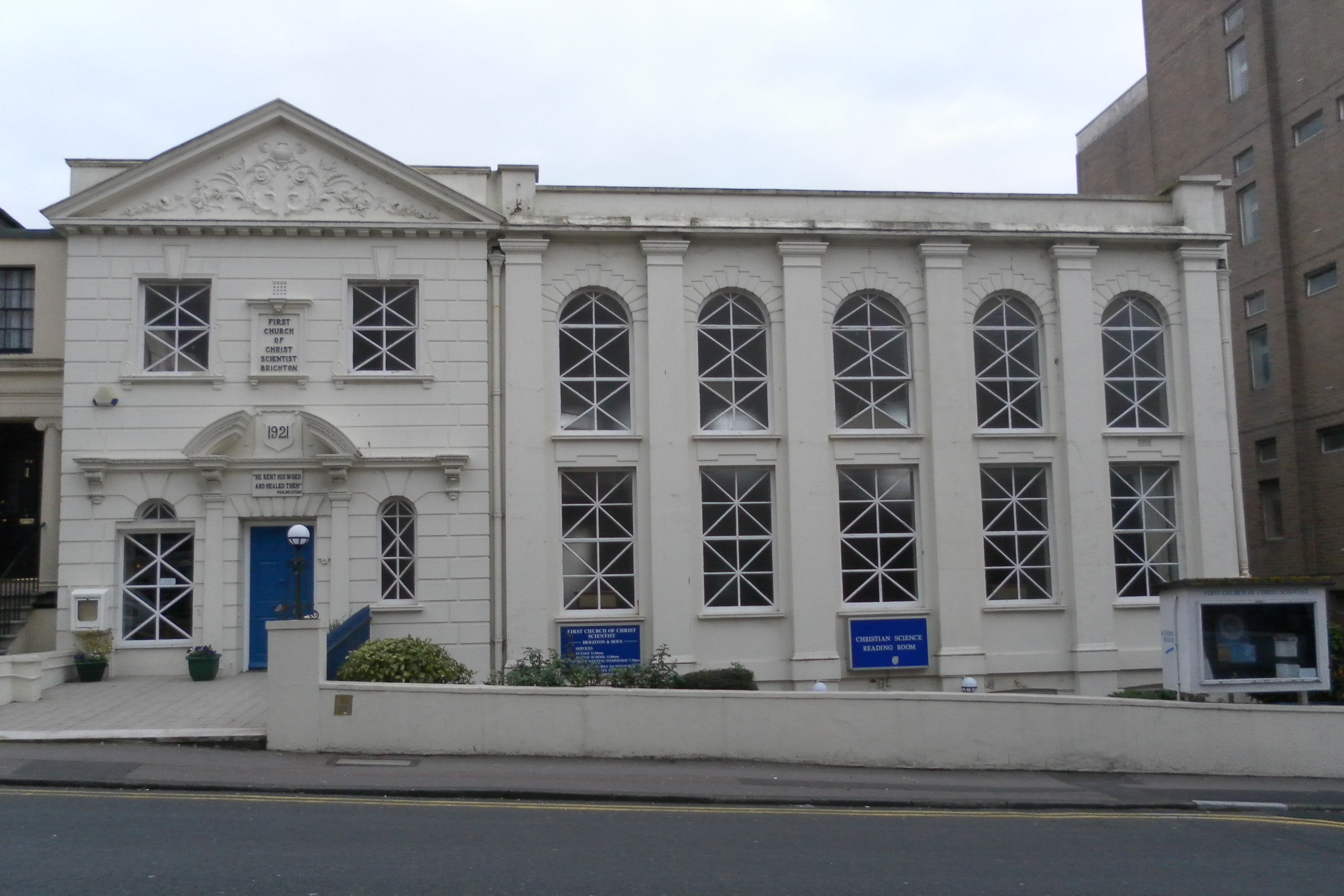
- The church from the west-northwest

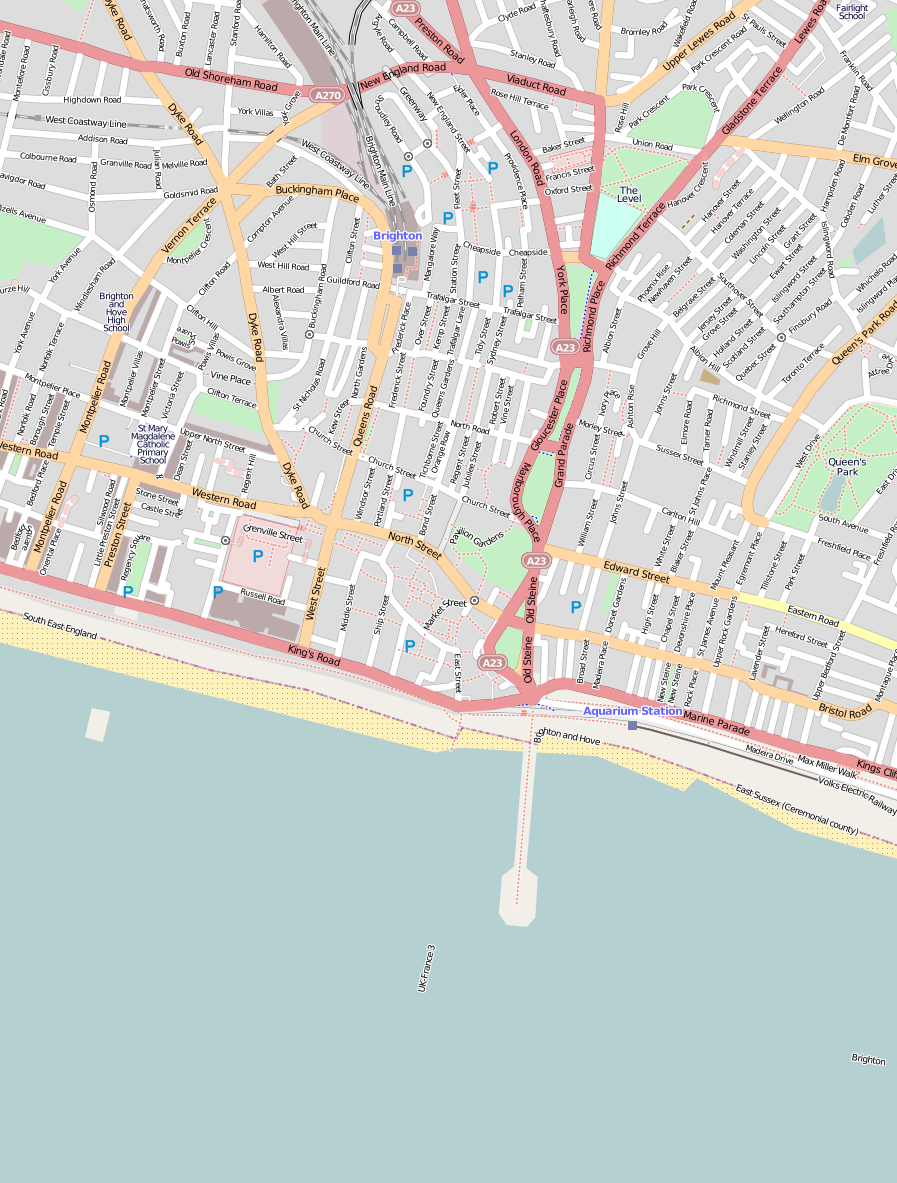
- Location within Brighton
- 50.8261°N 0.1519°W
- Location: 97 Montpelier Road, Montpelier, Brighton and Hove BN1 3BE
- Country: England
- Denomination: Christian Science
- Website: www.csbrighton.com

History
- Status: Church
- Founded: 1921

Architecture
- Functional status: Active
- Architect: Clayton & Black
- Style: Regency/Neoclassical
- Completed: 1921

The First Church of Christ, Scientist is a church serving members of the Church of Christ, Scientist denomination in the English coastal city of Brighton and Hove. The present building, originally a "notable" private house in Brighton's exclusive Montpelier suburb, was extended and converted into a church by prolific local architecture firm Clayton & Black in 1921.

== History ==
Montpelier was one of Brighton's earliest suburbs, laid out on a hillside between the 1820s and the 1860s in response to the town's rapid development as a fashionable seaside resort. The most rapid period of housebuilding was in the 1840s and 1850s, when Montpelier Road was developed with terraces of high-quality stuccoed Regency-style houses and larger villas. Number 97 Montpelier Road was built in about 1850 at the south end, near the junction with the major commercial route of Western Road.

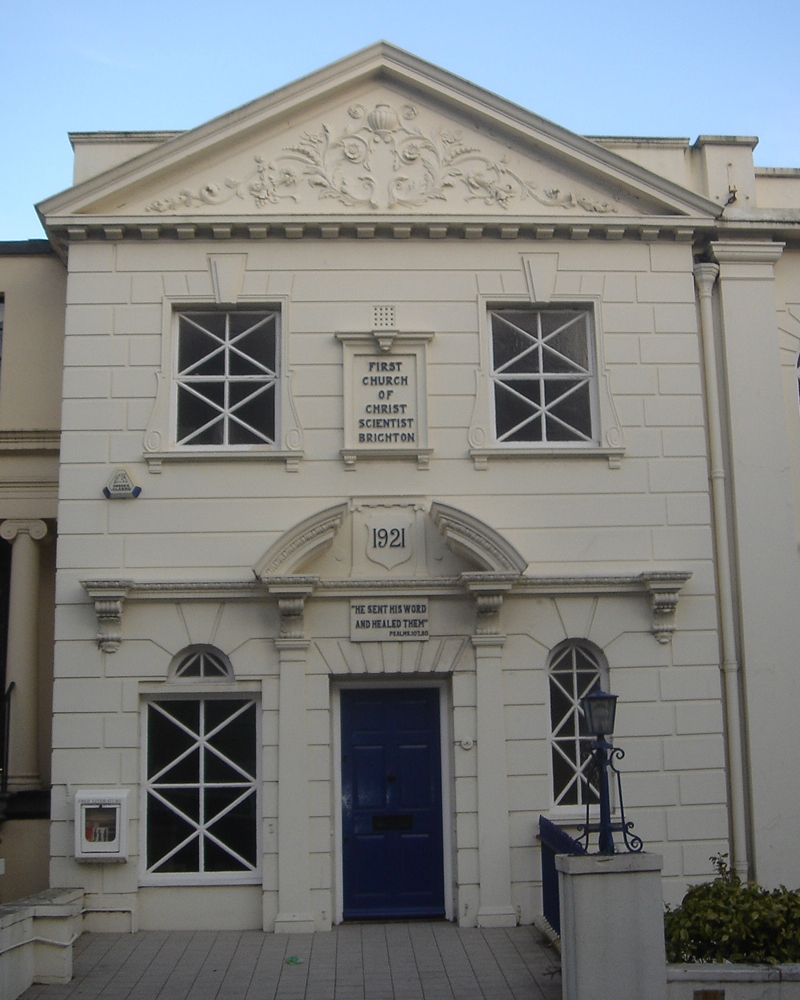
The church was converted from two houses (97 and 97a)which had in turn been converted from The Western College which itself was a conversion of Thomas Kemp's Montpelier House.

North Street was another important commercial street, lined with banks, offices, shops, inns and entertainment venues. In 1890, the Athenaeum Recreation Hall was built at number 148. Equipped with several rooms and capable of holding 500 people, it became one of the first meeting places in Brighton of followers of Mary Baker Eddy's Church of Christ, Scientist movement. Worship took place there from the early 20th century, and another church—the Central Spiritualist Church—was later established there as well. In 1921, Brighton architects Clayton & Black were commissioned (Charles Clayton had executed the original conversion of Montpelier House into two houses so was a natural choice to convert it back again) to convert 97 and 97a Montpelier Road (which had been acquired in 1909 and used as a separate church and reading room) back into a single large church to provide for the rapidly growing congregation. They substantially extended the building, creating a chapel to the south and embellishing the entrance in a Neoclassical style.

The church is registered as a place of worship in accordance with the Places of Worship Registration Act 1855; its number on the register is 44386. It lies within the Montpelier & Clifton Hill Conservation Area, one of 34 conservation areas in the city of Brighton and Hove. This was designated by Brighton Council in 1973 and extended to 75.4 acres (30.5 ha) in 1977. In their character statement published in 2005, Brighton and Hove City Council describe it as a "notable" building in an area "contain[ing] a high proportion of listed buildings and high quality unlisted properties ... which together form a cohesive and attractive street scene."

== Architecture ==
The Clayton & Black firm started in the 1870s, and by 1921 they had designed a wide range of buildings for many functions and in a great variety of styles, including Flemish Renaissance, François Premier Revival and Edwardian Baroque. Their two previous church commissions, both in Hove, included the Gothic Revival St Thomas the Apostle's Church. For their Montpelier Road commission, they added an elaborate Neoclassical-style façade to a house which, like its neighbours, reflected the transition from the Regency style to the Italianate; some original features were kept though. The whole façade is stuccoed and there is rustication all round the entrance, which is set in a three-bay section to the left (north). This is elaborately treated, with arched and straight-headed windows, a frieze and a "richly decorated pediment". To the right, the body of the chapel has five bays separated by full-height pilasters. The ground-floor windows are flat-headed; those above are arched. There is a gallery inside, and timber panelling is used around the reader's dais.

== See also ==
- List of places of worship in Brighton and Hove
- First Church of Christ, Scientist, Richmond
