= Brighton Friends Meeting House =

Historic Quaker meetinghouse in Brighton, England

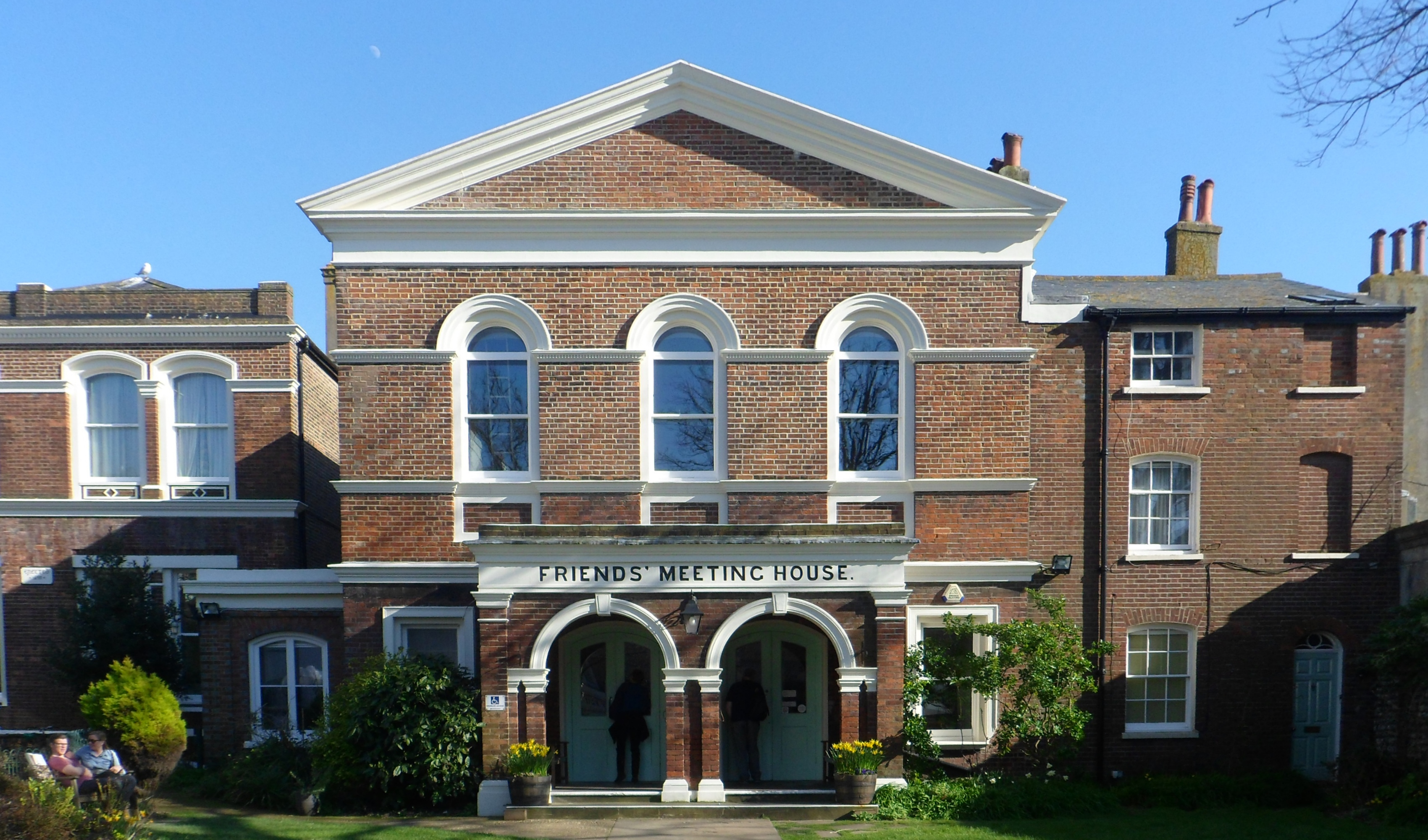
- The meeting house from the south

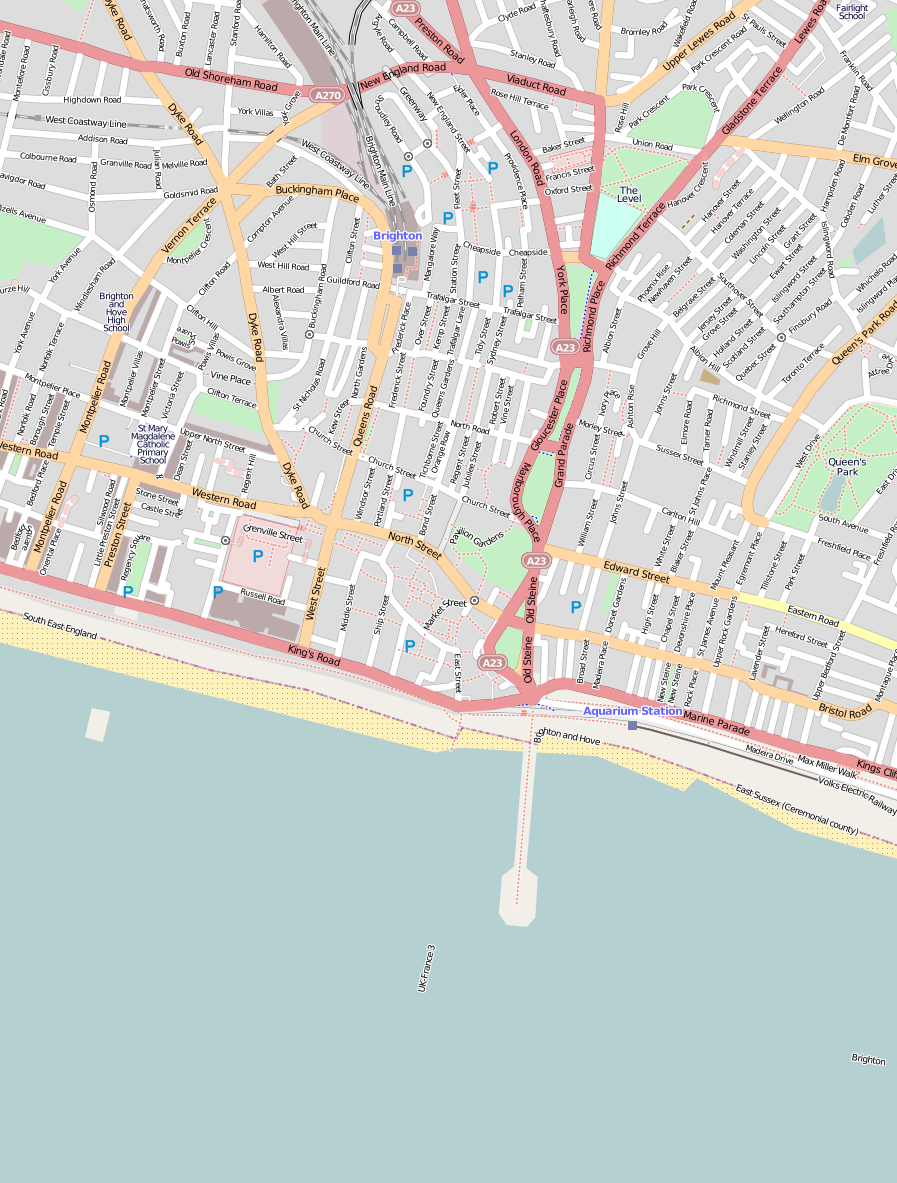
- The meeting house located within central Brighton

Religion
- Affiliation: Religious Society of Friends
- Ecclesiastical or organisational status: Meeting house
- Status: Active

Location
- Location: Prince Albert Street, Brighton, Brighton and Hove BN1 1AF, England
- Coordinates: 50.8219°N 0.1414°W

Architecture
- Architect: Clayton & Black (1876 extension)
- Style: Classical/Victorian
- Completed: 1805
- Construction cost: £1,000 (approx.)
- Direction of façade: South
- Listed Building – Grade II
- Official name: Friends' Meeting House and The Cottage
- Designated: 11 April 1995
- Reference no.: 1380935

Website
- www.brightonquakers.co.uk/

The Brighton Friends Meeting House is a Friends meeting house (Quaker place of worship) in the centre of Brighton, part of the city of Brighton and Hove in East Sussex, England. The building, which dates from 1805, replaced an earlier meeting house of 1690 what was then a small fishing village on the Sussex coast. Located at the junction of Ship Street and Prince Albert Street in The Lanes, the heart of Brighton's "old town" area, its architectural and historic importance has been recognised by English Heritage's granting of Grade II listed status.

== History ==
The Quaker community in Brighton had been prevented from congregating in public by the 1664 Conventicle Act, but some freedom was granted after the Act of Toleration 1689 was passed under William III and Mary II's joint sovereignty. By 1690, the community acquired a former malthouse and some adjoining land, which became their first permanent meeting house and a burial ground respectively. This stood near the junction of North Street and New Road, where the Pavilion Theatre now stands. When some pleasure gardens were laid out next to the meeting house in the 1790s, the community sold its grounds (known as Quaker's Croft and extending to 1 acre (0.40 ha)) to the Prince Regent, and sold the building separately; it was immediately demolished by its new owner. They used the £1,800 funds to buy a plot of land east of Ship Street for £1,000 and build a new meeting house, accessed by a narrow passageway next to two cottages which came with the land. It had an attached caretaker's cottage, and opened for worship in 1805. A large extension was added to the north in 1850; and in 1876, another extension was built to house educational facilities. This is now used for various cultural activities as well.

When the meeting house opened, it included a graveyard, but its size was significantly reduced when Prince Albert Street was built in 1838. A new burial ground, then in the parish of Rottingdean to the east of Brighton, was created in 1855. This in turn was built over in 1972, when the link road to Brighton Marina was built; bodies were disinterred and taken to another cemetery.

The meeting house and its associated buildings were listed at Grade II on 11 April 1995. It is one of 1,124 Grade II-listed buildings and structures, and 1,218 listed buildings of all grades, in the city of Brighton and Hove.

The meeting house is licensed for worship in accordance with the Places of Worship Registration Act 1855 and has the registration number 4542.

== Architecture ==
The original (1805) section is of three storeys with a single entrance at the southwest corner. The windows on the storeys above the entrance are bricked up; the original sash windows remain to their left. Each window is a different height, and those on the ground and first floors are arched at the top.

The main section of the meeting house is the 1850 centre section. This is arranged over two storeys and is topped by a corniced pediment and a gabled roof. There are twin arched entrances in a covered porch, which has an entablature carved with the words friends' meeting house. There is one window on each side of the porch, and three round-arched windows at first-floor level; these have architraves and are connected by a long sill.

The attached cottage and adult education centre are included in English Heritage's listing for their "group value"—they are considered architecturally complementary to the meeting house. The cottage is on the south side of the meeting house, and has a slate roof and exterior Flemish bond brickwork decorated with flint and stone dressings. The 1876 extension, on the left (north) side, was built in a similar style to the first extension of 1850; it has two storeys, each with two paired windows on each side of the entrance. The former graveyard is now a garden which surrounds the extension on two sides.

== See also ==
- Grade II listed buildings in Brighton and Hove: A–B
- List of places of worship in Brighton and Hove

== Bibliography ==
- Carder, Timothy (1990). The Encyclopaedia of Brighton. Lewes: East Sussex County Libraries. ISBN 0-86147-315-9.
- Dale, Antony (1989). Brighton Churches. London: Routledge. ISBN 0-415-00863-8.
- Nairn, Ian; Pevsner, Nikolaus (1965). The Buildings of England: Sussex. Harmondsworth: Penguin Books. ISBN 0-14-071028-0.
