= French Convalescent Home, Brighton =

French Convalescent Home
- Maison de Convalescence Française; Maison Française de Retraite et de Convalescence (French)
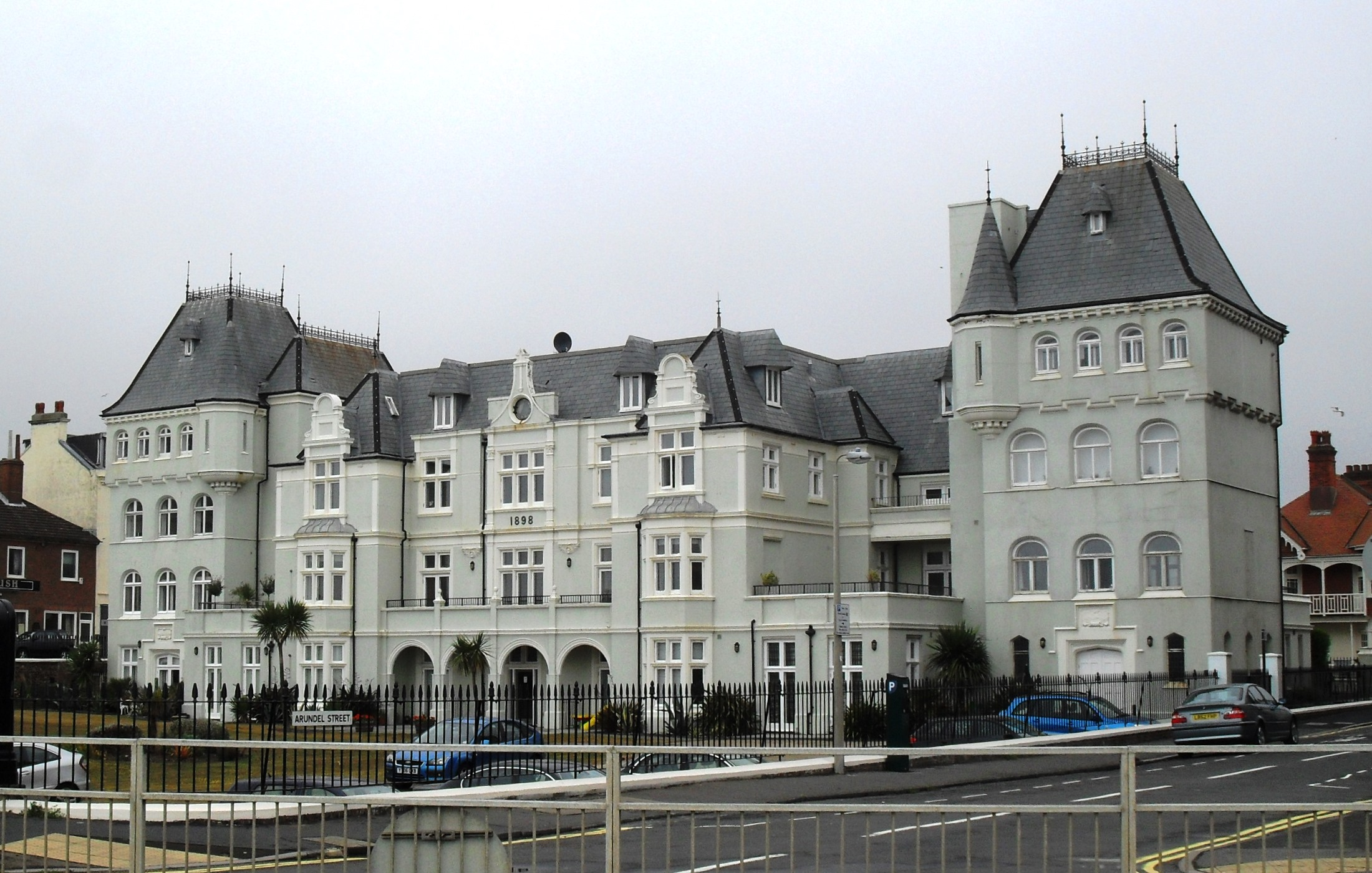
- The building from the south-southeast

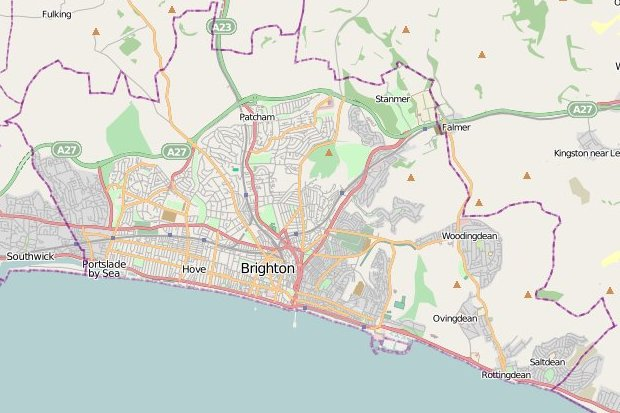
- Location within Brighton and Hove
- 50.8151°N 0.1074°W
- Location: De Courcel Road, Black Rock, Brighton, Brighton and Hove, East Sussex, United Kingdom

History
- Founded: 5 October 1895
- Built: 1895–1898
- Built for: Government of France

Site notes
- Architect: Clayton & Black
- Architectural style: French Renaissance Revival
- Restored: 2000
- Restored by: Bovis Homes Group

Listed Building – Grade II
- Official name: French Convalescent Home and attached wall and railings
- Designated: 26 January 2000
- Reference no.: 1380152

The former French Convalescent Home (now a residential development called The French Apartments) was a seafront sanatorium and rest home built in Brighton, part of the English seaside city of Brighton and Hove, on behalf of the French government. It received patients from the French Hospital in London and served as a home for elderly French nationals. It was sold for redevelopment in 1999 and was briefly threatened with demolition; but English Heritage listed the building at Grade II for its architectural and historical importance, and it was converted into flats. The unusual château-style French Renaissance Revival building has been criticised as "dreary" and "gauche", but is believed to be unique in England and demonstrated innovation in its use of double glazing.

== History ==
A hospital to serve London's French residents was opened in 1867; four years later, a French dispensary was opened on another site. In 1890, the institutions moved to a combined facility, the French Hospital, on Shaftesbury Avenue; funding came from the French government and other donors.

The French government sought to establish a home outside London where former patients of the hospital could recuperate. Brighton had grown in the previous century because of its proximity to London, excellent climate and status as a fashionable, high-class resort; these advantages helped Brighton to be chosen, and a site on the cliff above Black Rock and behind Marine Parade was found. On 5 October 1895, Baron de Courcel, the French Ambassador to the United Kingdom, laid the building's first stone. Local architecture firm Clayton & Black, who were responsible for many buildings throughout Brighton and the surrounding area, were commissioned to design the home; it has been described as an "interesting example of their work", which also encompasses such buildings as the mock-Tudor King and Queen Hotel, the former St Thomas the Apostle's Church and the pink Baroque former Leeds Permanent Building Society.

The institution opened in 1896, and was finished in its original form in 1898. Its capacity was 61. Two pavilions were added at the ends in 1904 and 1907: the eastern pavilion—named after Gambon, a later French Ambassador—came first, followed by the Ruffer pavilion (named after the French Hospital's president) on the west side.

From the beginning, nuns were used as nurses (the Sisters of St Paul of Chartres were responsible for the home until 1994), and non-French nationals were sometimes accepted as residents; during World War I, British soldiers injured in action were treated there. Structural alterations since 1907 included an extra wing on the east end in 1914, adding more capacity, and a new rendered façade, larger lift shaft, new internal doors, tiling and the removal of some chimneys.

In 1986, the local health authority registered the institution as a nursing home under its control. The Sisters of St Paul of Chartres still ran the home until 1994, though; at that time they were replaced by local council nurses. Five years later, the building's future was in doubt when its trustees sold it to housebuilder Gladedale Homes Group. The decision, on 29 October 1999, was followed four months later by an announcement that the home would close: all staff would be made redundant and all residents would have moved to other institutions by 31 May 2000. In the meantime, English Heritage granted Grade II listed status to the building, and instead of being demolished it was converted into fourteen luxury flats under the name "The French Apartments". Listed status was granted on 26 January 2000; the Grade II designation is given to "nationally important buildings of special interest". As of February 2001, it was one of 1,124 Grade II-listed buildings and structures, and 1,218 listed buildings of all grades, in the city of Brighton and Hove. It is the only known current or former French convalescent home in England, and was known in French as La Maison Française de Retraite et de Convalescence or La Maison de Convalescence Française.

== Architecture ==
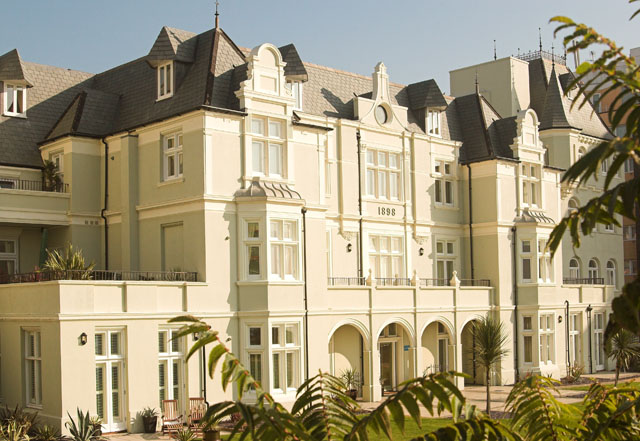
The building in 2005

The French Convalescent Home was designed by the Clayton & Black firm in the French Renaissance Revival style, making it appear "out of place on Brighton's seafront" (which consists almost exclusively of stuccoed Regency-style buildings). Nikolaus Pevsner and Ian Nairn criticised it as a "dreary institution", and the greyish-green cement applied to the exterior in the 20th century has made it appear drab. Other descriptions have included "gauche" and "interesting", and the building has been likened to a château.

The structure is built of Belgian brick (subsequently covered with cement) with some stonework. The roof is of slate with some ironwork at the tops of the pavilions. The use of concrete suspended floors and "secondary glazing" in most of the wooden-framed windows was requested in the design requirements; the latter represented the first use of double glazing in an English building. The entrance, facing north away from the sea, is set in a gabled recess below a cornice; there is a six-window range with some stained glass, and a double doorway at the top of a balustraded staircase. Facing the sea on the south side, behind a garden, is a five-bay, three-storey façade with french convalescent home and 1898 in black lettering, a ground-floor round-arched colonnade and small single-storey projections between the outer bays and the four-storey pavilions flanking them.

Interior facilities which existed before the building was sold for conversion included a three-bay chapel in the base of the eastern pavilion (with murals, wooden panelling and lancet windows), a billiards room in the western pavilion, two lounges and a dining room. Near the original oak staircase is a bronze statue of the founder of the French Hospital.

== See also ==
- Grade II listed buildings in Brighton and Hove: E–H
