= 1965 Leeds City Council election =

1965 English local government election

The 1965 municipal elections for Leeds were held on Thursday 13 May 1965, with one third of the council and an extra vacancy in Allerton to be elected.

Building upon the previous year, the Conservatives fully reversed the downward trend they'd been on since 1960. With a whopping 10.2% swing their way, they defeated the Labour Party in a manner not seen since 1951, with Labour's share reduced to the thirties - surpassing even their record low then.

The Conservatives six gains were largely a regaining of Labour's 1963 gains, with the notable exceptions of Beeston, which they already held, and Kirkstall - a first for the ward, which had been monolithically Labour since the boundary changes in 1951.

The Conservatives also recovered Roundhay from Labour who gained it in a by-election in 1963.

Elsewhere, the Liberals continued their decline from the 1962 highs, now at near enough where they were pre-spike. In contrast, the Communists, having steadily raised their candidates in each election since the mid-1950s were now fielding a record of 12, achieving party records in both vote and share. Turnout fell again by just over two percent on last year's figure to 34.5%.

== Election result ==
Leeds local election result 1965
Party	Seats	Gains	Losses	Net gain/loss	Seats %	Votes %	Votes	+/−
Conservative	17	6	0	+6	58.6	56.1	65,041	+11.2
Labour	12	0	6	-6	41.4	37.8	43,813	-9.1
Liberal	0	0	0	0	0.0	4.6	5,366	-2.5
Communist	0	0	0	0	0.0	1.5	1,741	+0.5

The result had the following consequences for the total number of seats on the council after the elections:

Party	Previous council		New council	
Party	Cllr	Ald	Cllr	Ald
Labour	56	19	50	19
Conservatives	28	9	34	9
Total	84	28	84	28
Total	112		112	
Working majority	28	10	16	10
Working majority	38		26	

== Ward results ==
Allerton
Party	Candidate	Votes	%	±%
Conservative	Frank Marshall	5,358	78.8	+9.4
Conservative	John William Harwood Long	5,174		
Labour	Gerald Bloom	1,442	21.2	−0.2
Labour	Donald Chadwick	1,308		
Majority		3,732	57.6	+9.7
Turnout		6,800		
Conservative hold		Swing		
Conservative hold		Swing	+4.8	

Armley
Party	Candidate	Votes	%	±%
Labour	Joseph Bissell	1,907	52.6	−7.2
Conservative	Kevin Anthony Beal	1,717	47.4	+19.0
Majority		190	5.2	−26.2
Turnout		3,624		
Labour hold		Swing	-13.1	

Beeston
Party	Candidate	Votes	%	±%
Conservative	Alan Hartley	3,496	58.4	+9.2
Labour	Eric Forbes Mill	2,400	40.1	−7.8
Communist	Frederick Sidebottom	87	1.5	−1.4
Majority		1,096	18.3	+17.0
Turnout		5,983		
Conservative hold		Swing	+8.5	

Blenheim
Party	Candidate	Votes	%	±%
Labour	William Merritt	1,100	59.6	−9.1
Conservative	Rolland Derrick Austwick	747	40.4	+9.1
Majority		353	19.2	−18.2
Turnout		1,847		
Labour hold		Swing	-9.1	

Bramley
Party	Candidate	Votes	%	±%
Conservative	Jack Hart	2,973	56.4	+16.9
Labour	William Lord	2,297	43.6	−16.9
Majority		676	12.8	−8.3
Turnout		5,270		
Conservative gain from Labour		Swing	+16.9	

Burmantofts
Party	Candidate	Votes	%	±%
Labour	George Murray	1,431	56.1	−16.2
Conservative	Jessie Margaret (commonly known as Peggy) White	1,120	43.9	+16.2
Majority		311	12.2	−32.3
Turnout		2,551		
Labour hold		Swing	-16.2	

City
Party	Candidate	Votes	%	±%
Labour	Bernard Peter Atha	724	61.6	−11.7
Conservative	Michael Herbert Baker	451	38.4	+11.7
Majority		273	23.2	−23.5
Turnout		1,175		
Labour hold		Swing	-11.7	

Cross Gates
Party	Candidate	Votes	%	±%
Labour	Enid Muriel Coward	3,708	57.7	−7.7
Conservative	Sidney Andrew Codd	2,294	35.7	+6.6
Communist	Henry Fawcett	421	6.6	+1.1
Majority		1,414	22.0	−14.4
Turnout		6,423		
Labour hold		Swing	-7.1	

East Hunslet
Party	Candidate	Votes	%	±%
Labour	Ernest Kavanagh	1,017	63.1	−9.2
Conservative	Keith Anthony Frederick Grainger	594	36.9	+9.2
Majority		423	26.2	−18.4
Turnout		1,611		
Labour hold		Swing	-9.2	

Far Headingley
Party	Candidate	Votes	%	±%
Conservative	Alan Edwin Roberts	5,905	67.2	+14.0
Labour	Nellie Doreen Jenner	1,649	18.8	−1.4
Liberal	Anastasios Christodoulop	1,238	14.1	−12.6
Majority		4,256	48.4	+21.9
Turnout		8,792		
Conservative hold		Swing	+7.7	

Halton
Party	Candidate	Votes	%	±%
Conservative	John Hutchings Rhodes	4,879	78.4	+8.9
Labour	Doreen Hamilton	1,347	21.6	−8.9
Majority		3,532	56.7	+17.7
Turnout		6,226		
Conservative hold		Swing	+8.9	

Harehills
Party	Candidate	Votes	%	±%
Conservative	Patrick Crotty	2,720	58.9	+7.5
Labour	Howard Howlett	1,639	35.5	−3.5
Liberal	Ronald Gibbon Sissons	258	5.6	−4.0
Majority		1,081	23.4	+11.0
Turnout		4,617		
Conservative hold		Swing	+5.5	

Holbeck
Party	Candidate	Votes	%	±%
Labour	Gertrude Bray	1,304	55.0	−1.5
Conservative	Michael Waddington	905	38.2	+11.7
Communist	Joyce McCarthy	160	6.8	+3.6
Majority		399	16.8	−13.2
Turnout		2,369		
Labour hold		Swing	-6.6	

Hunslet Carr
Party	Candidate	Votes	%	±%
Labour	Wilfred Parker	1,311	57.9	−4.9
Conservative	Herbert Ernest Lister	852	37.6	+6.0
Communist	Leslie Hunter	101	4.5	−1.1
Majority		459	20.3	−10.9
Turnout		2,264		
Labour hold		Swing	-5.4	

Hyde Park
Party	Candidate	Votes	%	±%
Conservative	Ronald Derek Fielding	2,495	55.9	+6.8
Labour	Wilfred Window	1,166	26.1	−12.8
Liberal	Deryck Ernest Senior	689	15.4	+3.3
Communist	Stanley Peter Walker	116	2.6	+2.6
Majority		1,329	29.8	+19.6
Turnout		4,466		
Conservative hold		Swing	+9.8	

Kirkstall
Party	Candidate	Votes	%	±%
Conservative	Raymond Kent	2,202	50.4	+16.3
Labour	Dennis Burrill Matthews	2,020	46.2	−9.0
Communist	Beryl Huffinley	150	3.4	+0.7
Majority		182	4.2	−17.0
Turnout		4,372		
Conservative gain from Labour		Swing	+12.6	

Meanwood
Party	Candidate	Votes	%	±%
Conservative	Thomas William Kirkby	3,232	67.6	+9.0
Labour	John McPheat	1,049	21.9	−9.2
Liberal	Evelyn Mary Briggs	500	10.5	+0.2
Majority		2,183	45.7	+18.3
Turnout		4,781		
Conservative hold		Swing	+9.1	

Middleton
Party	Candidate	Votes	%	±%
Labour	St. John Binns	1,833	74.7	−6.1
Conservative	Frank Stubley	477	19.4	+3.9
Communist	Enos Leslie Moore	143	5.8	+2.2
Majority		1,356	55.3	−10.0
Turnout		2,453		
Labour hold		Swing	-5.0	

Moortown
Party	Candidate	Votes	%	±%
Conservative	Louie Ellen Henson	5,532	71.2	+8.9
Labour	Bernard Ingham	1,485	19.1	−7.9
Liberal	Kenneth Roy Dunn	561	7.2	−3.5
Communist	Philip Boyes	190	2.4	+2.4
Majority		4,047	52.1	+16.8
Turnout		7,768		
Conservative hold		Swing	+8.4	

Osmondthorpe
Party	Candidate	Votes	%	±%
Labour	William John (aka Jack) Pritchard	1,322	65.3	−13.0
Conservative	Ethel Megan Lewis	704	34.7	+13.0
Majority		618	30.5	−26.0
Turnout		2,026		
Labour hold		Swing	-13.0	

Potternewton
Party	Candidate	Votes	%	±%
Conservative	Irwin Norman Bellow	2,270	56.2	+8.8
Labour	Joyce Brenda Gould	1,267	31.4	−11.7
Liberal	Sydney Herbert Bexan	427	10.6	+3.3
Communist	Raymond Ramsden	73	1.8	−0.4
Majority		1,003	24.8	+20.5
Turnout		4,037		
Conservative hold		Swing	+10.2	

Richmond Hill
Party	Candidate	Votes	%	±%
Labour	William Cain	1,463	69.6	−13.9
Conservative	Alfred Patrick Sexton	519	24.7	+12.2
Communist	Eric Burwin	121	5.8	+1.7
Majority		944	44.9	−26.1
Turnout		2,103		
Labour hold		Swing	-13.0	

Roundhay
Party	Candidate	Votes	%	±%
Conservative	Alan Commander Johnson	5,144	77.4	+9.2
Labour	Douglas Thomas	1,503	22.6	−9.2
Majority		3,641	54.8	+18.4
Turnout		6,647		
Conservative gain from Labour		Swing	+9.2	

Stanningley
Party	Candidate	Votes	%	±%
Conservative	Alfred Matthew Vickers	2,052	45.1	+11.0
Labour	John Henry Marshall	1,701	37.4	−10.9
Liberal	Dennis Pedder	793	17.4	−0.1
Majority		351	7.7	−6.4
Turnout		4,546		
Conservative gain from Labour		Swing	+10.9	

Wellington
Party	Candidate	Votes	%	±%
Labour	John Herbert Underwood	997	58.4	−10.9
Conservative	Elizabeth Anne Farrar	356	20.8	+3.9
Liberal	Ernest Howson	272	15.9	+5.7
Communist	Marion Rogers	83	4.9	+1.3
Majority		641	37.5	−14.8
Turnout		1,708		
Labour hold		Swing	-7.4	

Westfield
Party	Candidate	Votes	%	±%
Conservative	May Sexton	1,413	56.6	+8.3
Labour	Stanley Cohen	1,083	43.4	−8.3
Majority		330	13.2	+9.8
Turnout		2,496		
Conservative gain from Labour		Swing	+8.3	

Woodhouse
Party	Candidate	Votes	%	±%
Conservative	Frederick Chadwick Green	1,441	51.7	+12.5
Labour	Harold Bretherick	1,252	44.9	−13.3
Communist	Arthur Dale	96	3.4	+0.7
Majority		189	6.8	−12.2
Turnout		2,789		
Conservative gain from Labour		Swing	+12.9	

Wortley
Party	Candidate	Votes	%	±%
Conservative	Brian Emmett	3,193	51.4	+8.8
Labour	Joseph Stephenson	2,396	38.5	−9.8
Liberal	Walter Holdsworth	628	10.1	+1.0
Majority		797	12.8	+7.0
Turnout		6,217		
Conservative gain from Labour		Swing	+9.3	
