= 1964 Leeds City Council election =

English political contest

The 1964 municipal elections for Leeds were held on Thursday 7 May 1964, with one third of the council seats up for the election. Labour had gained a seat from the Conservatives in the interim.

The Liberal spike of 1962, having faltered the year before, fully unwound in this election, with the Conservatives - the party it had most harmed - seeing a slight recovery in their fortunes, by a tune of a 1.4% swing to them. That recovery, however, wasn't enough to stop Labour gaining their remaining seat in Wortley, confining them - with the exception of Beeston - to their reliable strongholds. Even there, Labour had made significant inroads, with the usually safe seats of Hyde Park and Potternewton converted to marginals, and in the case of the latter, slashing the majority to just 147 votes. Elsewhere, the Conservatives could be encouraged by the collapse of the Liberal threat in Far Headingley and May Sexton's efforts in Westfield looking increasingly likely to return her to the council with each election.

Pre-empting the upcoming aldermanic elections that year, the Gentlemen's agreement in place between the two parties to divide aldermen totals proportional to their councillors, reapportioned a further three from the Conservatives to Labour, reflecting the new councillor totals - which were Labour's best and the Conservative's worst since 1947. 1947 was also the year in which the Communists obtained their greatest vote, a figure they very nearly matched, fielding a record number of ten candidates. Turnout fell by a percentage point on the previous year, to 36.6%.

== Election result ==
Leeds local election result 1964
Party	Seats	Gains	Losses	Net gain/loss	Seats %	Votes %	Votes	+/−
Labour	18	1	0	+1	64.3	46.9	58,821	+1.9
Conservative	10	0	1	-1	35.7	44.9	56,340	+4.7
Liberal	0	0	0	0	0.0	7.1	8,910	-6.8
Communist	0	0	0	0	0.0	1.0	1,320	+0.1

The result had the following consequences for the total number of seats on the council after the elections:

Party	Previous council		New council	
Party	Cllr	Ald	Cllr	Ald
Labour	55	16	56	19
Conservatives	29	12	28	9
Total	84	28	84	28
Total	112		112	
Working majority	26	4	28	10
Working majority	30		38	

== Ward results ==
Allerton
Party	Candidate	Votes	%	±%
Conservative	L. Bidgood	4,906	69.4	+5.7
Labour	W. Pepper	1,516	21.4	+2.3
Liberal	Julius Blum	652	9.2	−8.0
Majority		3,390	47.9	+3.4
Turnout		7,074		
Conservative hold		Swing	+1.7	

Armley
Party	Candidate	Votes	%	±%
Labour	K. Cohen	2,550	59.9	+4.5
Conservative	A. Stephen	1,211	28.4	+0.3
Liberal	Graham Rowlands	499	11.7	−4.8
Majority		1,339	31.4	+4.1
Turnout		4,260		
Labour hold		Swing	+2.1	

Beeston
Party	Candidate	Votes	%	±%
Conservative	L. Snape	3,262	49.2	+8.2
Labour	E. Mill	3,173	47.9	+0.2
Communist	M. Moore	192	2.9	+1.7
Majority		89	1.3	−5.3
Turnout		6,627		
Conservative hold		Swing	+4.0	

Blenheim
Party	Candidate	Votes	%	±%
Labour	J. Wallbanks	1,382	68.7	−1.2
Conservative	J. Jenkinson	631	31.3	+1.2
Majority		751	37.3	−2.4
Turnout		2,013		
Labour hold		Swing	-1.2	

Bramley
Party	Candidate	Votes	%	±%
Labour	Eric Atkinson	3,749	60.5	+13.6
Conservative	F. Stubley	2,444	39.5	+1.7
Majority		1,305	21.1	+11.9
Turnout		6,193		
Labour hold		Swing	+5.9	

Burmantofts
Party	Candidate	Votes	%	±%
Labour	G. Lloyd	2,064	72.3	−2.0
Conservative	M. Bauchop	792	27.7	+2.0
Majority		1,272	44.5	−4.0
Turnout		2,856		
Labour hold		Swing	-2.0	

City
Party	Candidate	Votes	%	±%
Labour	A. Tallant	1,019	73.4	+0.2
Conservative	D. Phillips	370	26.6	−0.2
Majority		649	46.7	+0.4
Turnout		1,389		
Labour hold		Swing	+0.2	

Cross Gates
Party	Candidate	Votes	%	±%
Labour	F. Booth	3,350	65.5	−3.9
Conservative	P. Sharples	1,489	29.1	−1.5
Communist	H. Fawcett	278	5.4	+5.4
Majority		1,861	36.4	−2.3
Turnout		5,117		
Labour hold		Swing	-1.2	

East Hunslet
Party	Candidate	Votes	%	±%
Labour	M. Fish	1,597	72.4	−0.1
Conservative	K. Grainge	610	27.6	+0.1
Majority		987	44.7	−0.3
Turnout		2,207		
Labour hold		Swing	-0.1	

Far Headingley
Party	Candidate	Votes	%	±%
Conservative	W. Hey	4,993	53.2	+7.1
Liberal	John Humphrey Morrish	2,503	26.7	−10.3
Labour	J. Taylor	1,892	20.2	+3.2
Majority		2,490	26.5	+17.5
Turnout		9,388		
Conservative hold		Swing	+8.7	

Halton
Party	Candidate	Votes	%	±%
Conservative	C. Watson	4,049	69.5	−2.2
Labour	D. Hamilton	1,778	30.5	+2.2
Majority		2,271	39.0	−4.3
Turnout		5,827		
Conservative hold		Swing	-2.2	

Harehills
Party	Candidate	Votes	%	±%
Conservative	Lawrence Turnbull	2,653	51.4	+0.2
Labour	K. Lloyd	2,014	39.0	+3.3
Liberal	Ronald Gibbon Sissons	494	9.6	−3.4
Majority		639	12.4	−3.1
Turnout		5,161		
Conservative hold		Swing	-1.5	

Holbeck
Party	Candidate	Votes	%	±%
Labour	W. Jones	1,851	56.5	−2.1
Conservative	A. Redmond	868	26.5	+2.2
Liberal	J. Crawshaw	452	13.8	+0.2
Communist	J. McCarthy	104	3.2	−0.4
Majority		983	30.0	−4.3
Turnout		3,275		
Labour hold		Swing	-2.1	

Hunslet Carr
Party	Candidate	Votes	%	±%
Labour	J. Hodkinson	1,823	62.8	+0.0
Conservative	R. Austwick	918	31.6	+7.6
Communist	A. Gibbons	161	5.5	+2.0
Majority		905	31.2	−7.5
Turnout		2,902		
Labour hold		Swing	-3.8	

Hyde Park
Party	Candidate	Votes	%	±%
Conservative	F. Hall	2,214	49.0	+4.3
Labour	W. Prichard	1,755	38.9	+3.2
Liberal	Sydney Herbert Bexan	547	12.1	−7.5
Majority		459	10.2	+1.2
Turnout		4,516		
Conservative hold		Swing	+0.5	

Kirkstall
Party	Candidate	Votes	%	±%
Labour	Albert Smith	2,723	55.2	+2.0
Conservative	R. Kent	1,678	34.0	+4.1
Liberal	D. Whittaker	394	8.0	−5.4
Communist	B. Huffingley	134	2.7	−0.7
Majority		1,045	21.2	−2.1
Turnout		4,929		
Labour hold		Swing	-1.0	

Meanwood
Party	Candidate	Votes	%	±%
Conservative	V. Cardno	3,202	58.6	+4.4
Labour	J. McPheat	1,702	31.1	+3.4
Liberal	Evelyn Mary Briggs	563	10.3	−7.8
Majority		1,500	27.4	+1.0
Turnout		5,467		
Conservative hold		Swing	+0.5	

Middleton
Party	Candidate	Votes	%	±%
Labour	A. Malcolm	2,315	80.9	+3.8
Conservative	E. Baker	445	15.5	+3.2
Communist	E. Moore	103	3.6	−0.3
Majority		1,870	65.3	+0.5
Turnout		2,863		
Labour hold		Swing	+0.3	

Moortown
Party	Candidate	Votes	%	±%
Conservative	John Watson	4,627	62.3	+2.6
Labour	W. Window	2,005	27.0	+3.1
Liberal	E. Norris	799	10.8	−5.7
Majority		2,622	35.3	−0.5
Turnout		7,431		
Conservative hold		Swing	-0.2	

Osmondthorpe
Party	Candidate	Votes	%	±%
Labour	G. Addlestone	2,118	78.2	+1.4
Conservative	K. Mitchell	589	21.8	−1.4
Majority		1,529	56.5	+2.9
Turnout		2,707		
Labour hold		Swing	+1.4	

Potternewton
Party	Candidate	Votes	%	±%
Conservative	Sydney Symmonds	1,606	47.5	+2.0
Labour	Joyce Gould	1,459	43.1	+7.7
Liberal	John Brian Meeks	245	7.2	−8.3
Communist	R. Ramsden	74	2.2	−1.4
Majority		147	4.3	−5.8
Turnout		3,384		
Conservative hold		Swing	-2.8	

Richmond Hill
Party	Candidate	Votes	%	±%
Labour	A. King	2,078	83.5	+3.5
Conservative	S. Wheldale	310	12.4	−2.9
Communist	E. Burwin	102	4.1	−0.6
Majority		1,768	71.0	+6.4
Turnout		2,490		
Labour hold		Swing	+3.2	

Roundhay
Party	Candidate	Votes	%	±%
Conservative	Allan Bretherick	4,869	68.2	+8.3
Labour	A. Baum	2,268	31.8	+10.1
Majority		2,601	36.4	−1.8
Turnout		7,137		
Conservative hold		Swing	-0.9	

Stanningley
Party	Candidate	Votes	%	±%
Labour	H. Waterman	2,525	48.3	+5.1
Conservative	A. Vickers	1,786	34.1	+5.7
Liberal	Dennis Pedder	920	17.6	−10.7
Majority		739	14.1	−0.7
Turnout		5,231		
Labour hold		Swing	-0.3	

Wellington
Party	Candidate	Votes	%	±%
Labour	N. Barrett	1,551	69.3	+1.7
Conservative	K. Beal	380	17.0	+5.2
Liberal	Walter Holdsworth	229	10.2	−5.3
Communist	B. Kline	79	3.5	−1.5
Majority		1,171	52.3	+0.3
Turnout		2,239		
Labour hold		Swing	-1.7	

Westfield
Party	Candidate	Votes	%	±%
Labour	V. Whelan	1,344	51.7	−2.1
Conservative	May Sexton	1,256	48.3	+2.1
Majority		88	3.4	−4.2
Turnout		2,600		
Labour hold		Swing	-2.1	

Woodhouse
Party	Candidate	Votes	%	±%
Labour	P. Taylor	1,981	58.1	+4.2
Conservative	F. Greene	1,333	39.1	+7.6
Communist	A. Dale	93	2.7	−0.9
Majority		648	19.0	−3.5
Turnout		3,407		
Labour hold		Swing	-1.7	

Wortley
Party	Candidate	Votes	%	±%
Labour	J. Klineberg	3,239	48.3	+6.2
Conservative	B. Emmett	2,849	42.5	+2.8
Liberal	Kenneth Roy Dunn	613	9.1	−9.0
Majority		390	5.8	+3.4
Turnout		6,701		
Labour gain from Conservative		Swing	+1.7	
