= The Montefiore Hospital, Hove =

The Montefiore Hospital
- Spire Healthcare
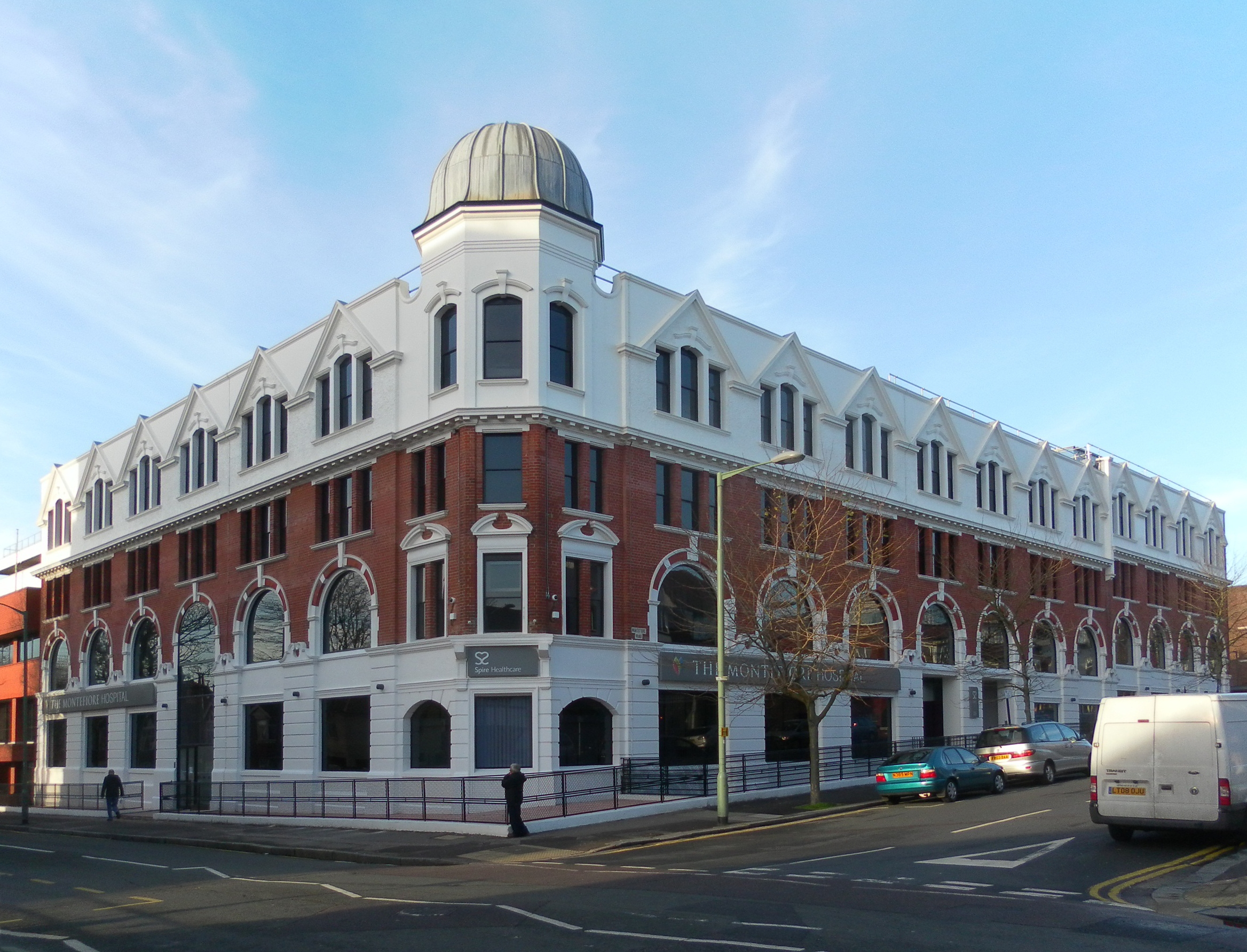
- The building in December 2012

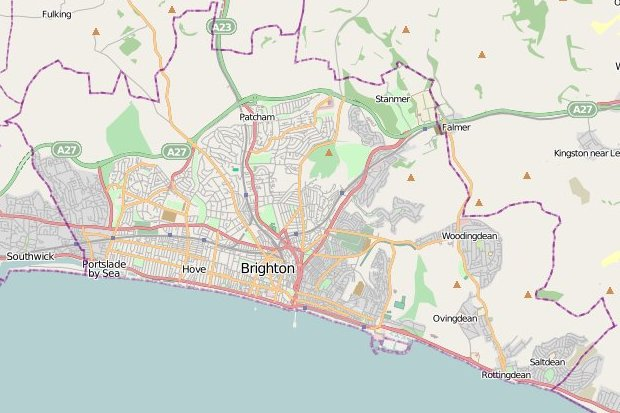
- Location of the hospital in Brighton and Hove

Geography
- Location: Davigdor Road/Montefiore Road, Hove BN3 1RD, Brighton and Hove, England, United Kingdom
- Coordinates: 50.831659°N 0.15566°W

Organisation
- Care system: Private
- Network: Spire Healthcare

Services
- Emergency department: No Accident & Emergency
- Beds: 21

History
- Founded: 2012

Links
- Website: themontefiorehospital.co.uk
- Lists: Hospitals in England

The Montefiore Hospital is a private hospital in Hove, part of the English coastal city of Brighton and Hove. It opened in November 2012 and is operated by Spire Healthcare, the second largest provider of private healthcare in the United Kingdom. The hospital is located in a large and "distinctive Edwardian commercial building" designed by prolific local architects Clayton & Black between 1899 and 1904. Originally built for local department store Hanningtons as a furniture depository, the "magnificent red-brick building" was converted into offices for the Legal & General insurance company in 1972. Six years after that firm moved to a new site in Hove, Spire Healthcare bought the empty building and spent £25 million converting it into a hospital.

== History of the building ==
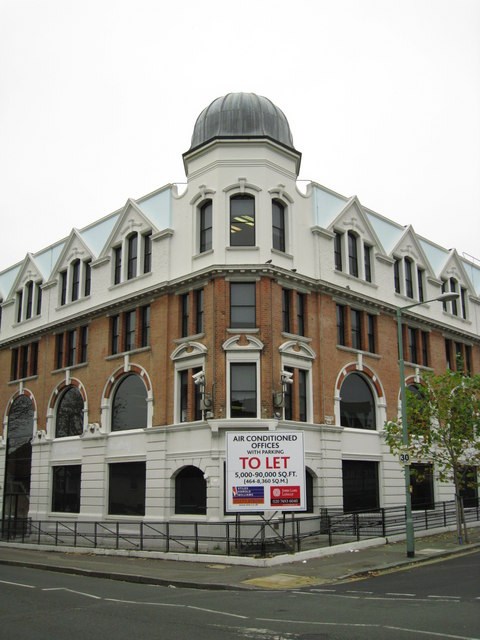
The building (pictured in 2007) was put up for sale in 2005 after Legal & General moved out.

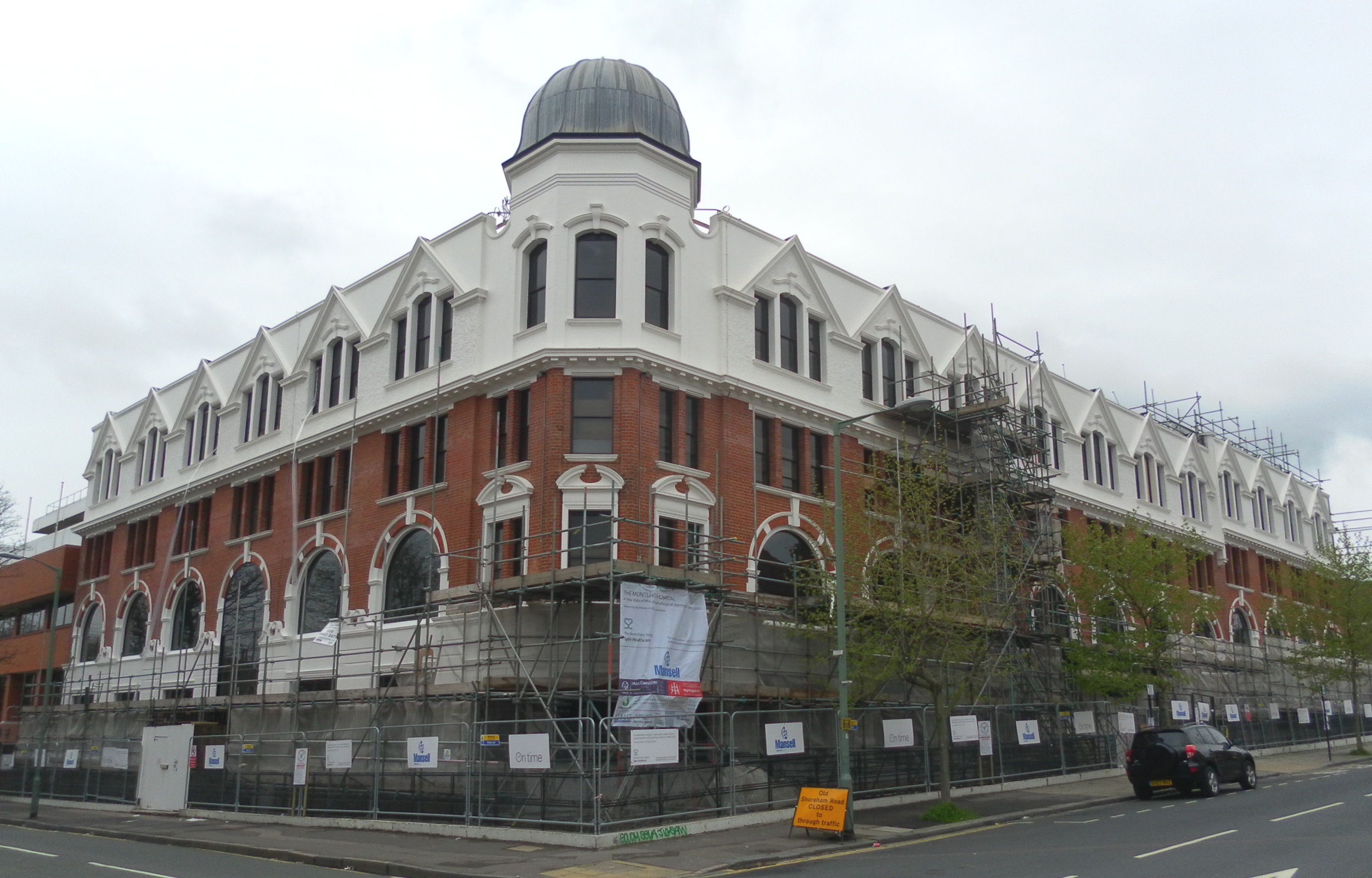
Refurbishment took place in 2011–12.

Hanningtons, Brighton's oldest and most famous department store, was opened in a single shop unit in the town's North Street in 1808. By the end of the 19th century it had expanded substantially and had floated on the stock market. More buildings were acquired throughout the town as the business grew, and by the 1860s Charles Smith Hannington (who had inherited the business from his father) had established a furniture storage and removals division for the benefit of people moving to the many villas and large houses built in Brighton and neighbouring Hove in that era.

As this sideline expanded to cover removals from all parts of Britain, larger premises were needed. In 1898, Hanningtons found a suitable site in Hove, then a smaller town adjoining Brighton to the west, and commissioned architects Clayton & Black to draw up a plan for a furniture depository. Clayton & Black (Charles E. Clayton, Ernest Black and their sons and various partners) were a prolific local firm who at the time were also based in North Street, Brighton. Their commissions there included extensions to the Brighton Friends Meeting House and the Theatre Royal, but much of their early work was in Hove, where they designed residential buildings including Gwydyr Mansions and most of the Vallance Estate. The "imposing site" chosen by Hanningtons was at the junction of Davigdor and Montefiore Roads, near the Brighton boundary. On 16 March 1899, Hove Council gave their approval to the proposal; but work was delayed for more than two years until the land could be bought from the estate of the Goldsmid family. This transaction was completed on 11 November 1901 at a cost of £3,750 (£399,000 as of 2025). Work on the depository continued until 1904. Clayton & Black were again commissioned to extend the premises in 1915 and 1925; the latter work consisted of a workshop and stables, which were added to the northeast (Montefiore Road) side.

Hanningtons occupied the building until 1972, when it was sold to the Legal & General Assurance Society. Architects Devereux and Partners undertook an "elegant" conversion of the premises on behalf of the insurance firm, including reglazing the windows while restoring their arched surrounds to their original condition. In its new form, it was the earliest in a succession of large office buildings on the north side of Davigdor Road. Legal & General occupied the building until 2005, when the new City Park office development next to Hove Park was completed and the company moved its offices there. The Davigdor Road building was bought by the Scottish Widows Investment Partnership, an asset management company, and stood empty for six years.

In early 2011, it was stated that Spire Healthcare—a major operator of private hospitals in Britain—had acquired the building and would spend £25 million converting it into a hospital. Construction was expected to take 15 months. Renovations, which involved preserving the exterior features while removing all the old interior fittings and installing facilities such as operating theatres and consultation rooms, were carried out by Nightingale Architects with oversight from the hospital's director. The work received a "Best Refurbishment" award in the Acumen Commercial Property Awards held in Brighton in April 2012, at which the achievement of a "very good" BREEAM energy efficiency rating was noted. As well as Nightingale, a local firm, other companies involved with the project were A.F. Pilbeam and Mansell Construction (building work) and EMC Management Consultants (project management).

When the project was announced, a summer 2012 opening date was anticipated, and Spire Healthcare later announced 29 October 2012 as the first day of operation, but The Montefiore Hospital eventually opened in November of that year.

The name of the hospital comes from its location on the corner of Montefiore Road, Hove, named for the philanthropist Sir Moses Montefiore.

== Hospital facilities ==
Private facilities established at The Montefiore Hospital since it opened include the Sussex IBS Clinic, for the treatment of irritable bowel syndrome, and the Spring Orthopaedic Centre. Consultations and treatments are offered for many other conditions and specialisms, such as dermatology, gynaecology, rheumatology and cosmetic surgery. In September 2012, an MRI scanner was installed at a cost of £1 million. There are three operating theatres, 20 private en-suite bedrooms and facilities for outpatient treatment.

== Hospital consultant specialities ==
- Breast surgery
- Cardiology
- Colorectal surgery
- Cosmetic surgery
- Dermatology
- Ear, nose and throat (ENT)
- Endocrinology
- Gastroenterology
- General surgery
- Gynaecology
- Haematology
- Neurology
- Oncology
- Oral and maxillofacial surgery
- Orthopaedic Surgery
- Pain management
- Podiatry
- Rheumatology
- Spinal surgery
- Urology
- Vascular surgery
- Weight loss surgery

== Architecture ==
Clayton & Black were a prolific and important local architecture firm in the late 19th and 20th centuries. Their work encompassed a great variety of architectural styles and a wide range of building types—although they specialised in commercial buildings. They provided for Hanningtons "a magnificent red-brick building embellished with white stone and fine arched windows". Situated on an "imposing" corner site, it was given further prominence with a "handsome" corner dome. The Davigdor Road (south) and Montefiore Road (east) elevations were 120 feet (37 m) and 277 feet (84 m) long respectively, and there was 5,500 square metres (59,000 sq ft) of storage space inside, spread over five floors. These were stepped upwards from south to north because of the slope of the land, and load-bearing walls divided the interior into six sections. This meant the building was not well suited to the open-plan layout preferred in modern offices: "little interest" was shown by prospective commercial buyers during the years it was on the market.

== See also ==
- Healthcare in Sussex
- List of hospitals in England
