= Hanningtons =

Former department store in Brighton

Coordinates: 50.8222425°N 0.1395229°W

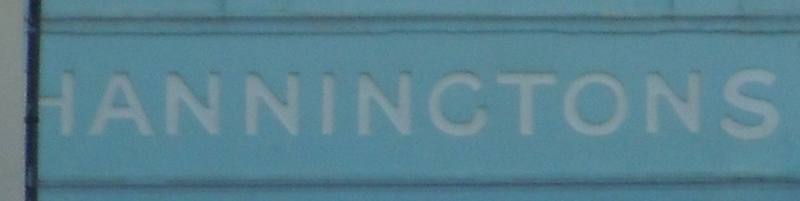
- Type: Privately held company
- Industry: Retail
- Founded: 25 July 1808; 218 years ago Brighton, England
- Founder: Smith Hannington
- Defunct: 30 June 2001; 25 years ago (192 years, 11 months and 5 days)
- Fate: Dissolved
- Headquarters: Brighton, England, United Kingdom
- Number of locations: 1
- Products: Various, including clothing, furniture, lighting, household accessories and music equipment
- Services: Removals, furniture storage, limousine hire, funeral arranging

Hanningtons was a department store located in the English coastal city of Brighton and Hove. Prominently situated in a central position in Brighton, it had an unbroken history of trading for nearly 200 years until its closure in 2001. It was the city's oldest, largest and most diverse department store: its 70 departments offered clothes and household goods of all types, and services ranging from funeral arrangement to carpet-cleaning. "Famous" and "prestigious", it was known locally as the "Harrods of Brighton". It remained in family ownership until the 1960s, and subsequent owners ran the business according to the principles of the Hannington family.

Hanningtons grew from a single shop on the town's North Street into a large store spanning numerous shop units on that road and neighbouring streets. Some services were housed in other buildings elsewhere in Brighton and Hove. Regular expansion meant many changes to the main building, but its overall architectural style dates from the 1860s when architect William Russell unified the shop units owned by Hanningtons at that time into a common style. Part of the former store—the section at numbers 41 and 42 East Street, acquired in 1882—is listed at Grade II for its architectural and historical importance.

== Hannington family ==
The Hannington name has a long history in the Brighton, Hove and Shoreham-by-Sea area. Thomas Hannington of Southwick was recorded in the Portslade Manor Court Book of 1706; a John Hannington was living in Portslade in 1719; and his father (also John) was buried at St Nicolas Church, Portslade in 1739. Later in the 18th century, Charles Hannington of Shoreham-by-Sea, "known as a man of superhuman strength", married Mary Mepham and had three sons. Charles Mepham Hannington was born in 1774 and qualified as a solicitor; Henry Hannington died in 1781 aged five; and Smith Hannington (born in 1784) became a draper's apprentice in Brighton in about 1798. He worked long hours and quickly learnt about the drapery business.

== Founding ==
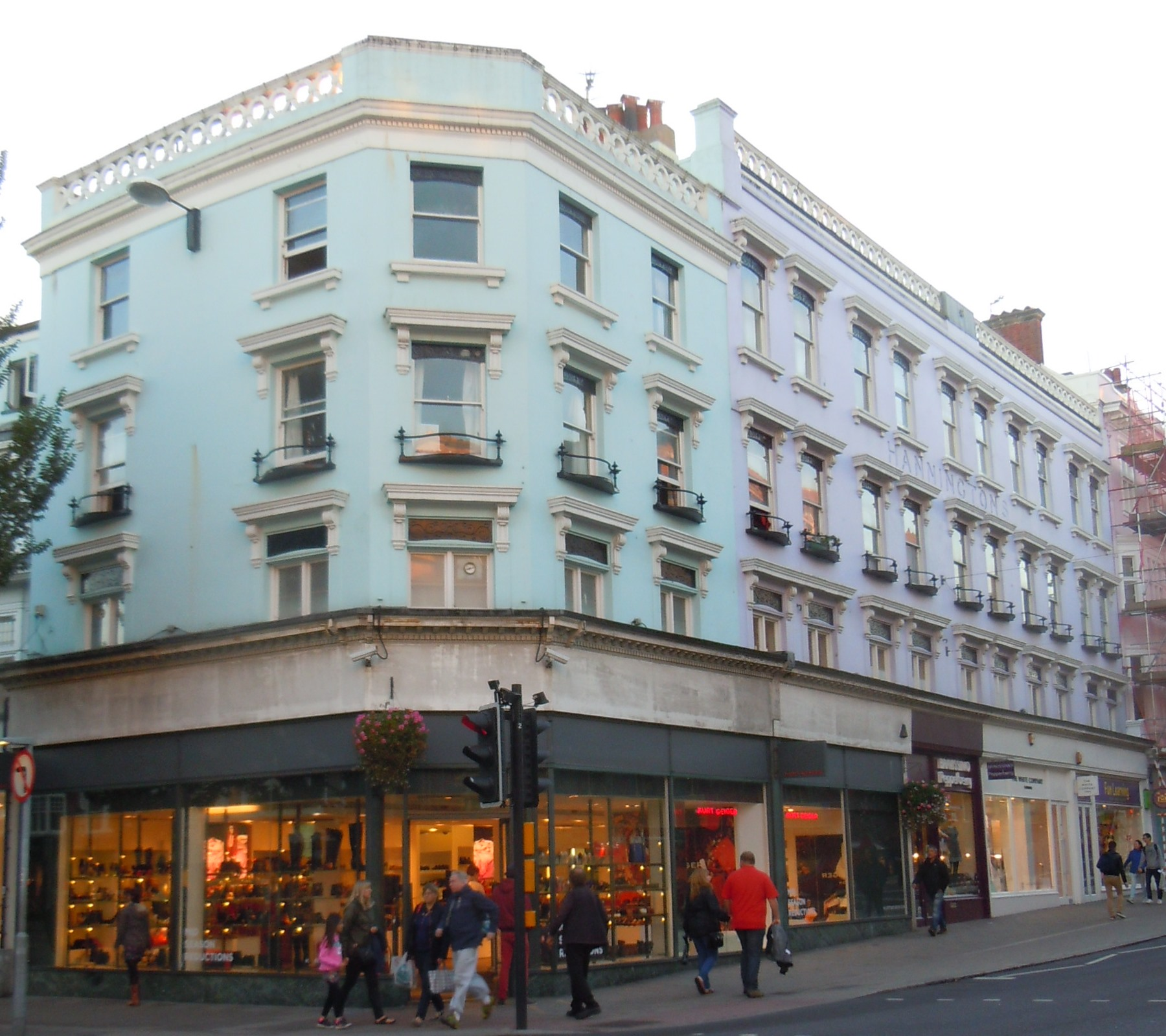
Hanningtons was founded at 3 North Street, on the site of these later buildings.

North Street runs westwards from Old Steine, Brighton's original fashionable centre, and forms the northern boundary of the old town. It has been the commercial heart of Brighton since the 18th century. At that time, its eastern end (which widened to form Castle Square) was home to popular inns and served as the terminus for coaches from London. At number 3 North Street, next to the main coach office, stood a small shop unit measuring 30 by 12 feet (9.1 m × 3.7 m); a contemporary illustration showed it to be a squat two-storey building with large bay windows. Smith Hannington acquired it in 1808, but the circumstances are uncertain: he either bought it from a debt-ridden business associate, or already part-owned it and gained the whole share when the co-owner died. The shop was operated as a drapery business in 1802 by the Constable brothers, who were notorious in Brighton for claiming to be able to fly from one end of Ireland's Pleasure Gardens to the other, and James Ireland himself (who had various business interests as well as his Gardens) was apparently involved as well from 1806.

Hannington opened a drapery shop under his own name at 3 North Street on 25 July 1808. He advertised his "new and elegant Assortment of Goods ... at unusual Low Prices" in the Brighton Herald and the Sussex Daily Advertiser, two prominent local newspapers, and described the range of services as "linen drapery, mercery, haberdashery and hosiery". This single shop was the origin of the Hanningtons department store.

== Expansion ==
In the early 19th century Brighton grew rapidly and was a favourite destination of wealthy visitors from London. The shop's central position on what diarist and journalist H.R. Attree (Note: Harry R. Attree was part of the Attree dynasty who have been active in public life in Brighton since William Attree went into business as a solicitor in the 1760s. Harry's accomplishments in the town included co-founding the Brighton Herald in 1806.) called "the Bond-street of Brighton" enabled it to thrive immediately. In 1816 Smith Hannington's mother died and he received an inheritance, and his new wife provided some more money. This allowed him to buy several nearby shop units, allowing him to expand the shop to become Brighton's largest department store. In the same year the store was granted a Royal Warrant. By 1847 he had acquired the leases or the freehold of numbers 1, 2 and 4 North Street, a house on Market Street and eight shops on Brighton Place (behind North Street). He leased some of them to other businesses, but others were used to expand the department store. He also acquired a building on nearby East Street and diversified into the funeral arranging and undertaking business from these premises.

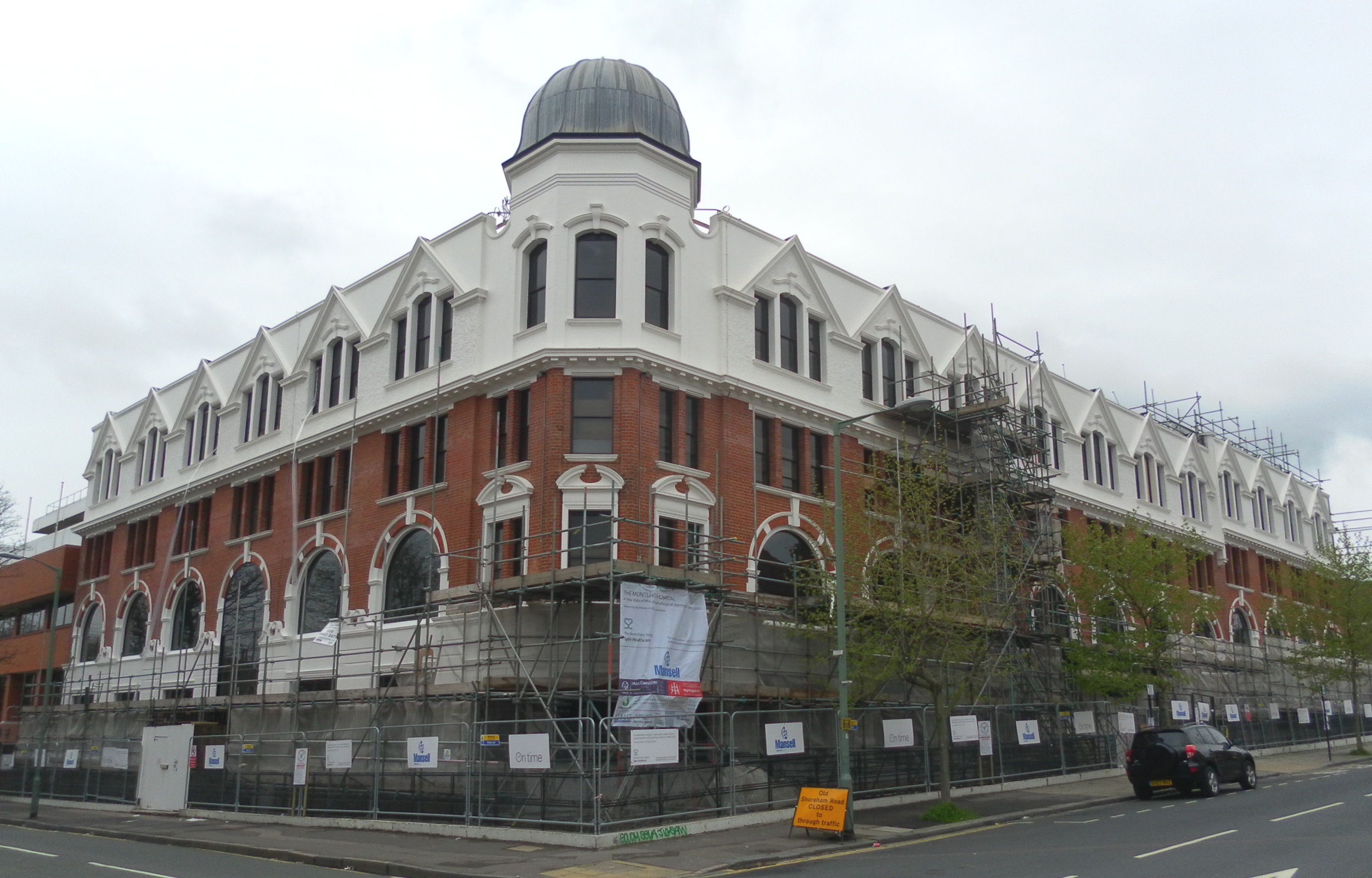
The Hanningtons Furniture Depository was built in Hove in 1901–04. It is now the Montefiore Hospital.

Smith Hannington died in 1855, leaving two surviving children (Note: Four others predeceased him.) and his wife Elizabeth. Charles Smith Hannington, his only surviving son, took over the business. Its success and profitability by this time allowed him to buy a country estate in Hurstpierpoint, just outside Brighton. (Note: He later extended his landholding in Hurstpierpoint by buying a neighbouring estate, and erected a private Nonconformist chapel after falling out with the vicar of Hurstpierpoint church and seceding from the Church of England.) Two of Charles Hannington's nine children followed him into the business: Samuel, who later took over the business, and James. James's intellectual curiosity was "totally unsuited to business life", and after studying at Oxford he became the first Bishop of Equatorial East Africa and was martyred in 1885. (Note: The Bishop Hannington Memorial Church in the West Blatchington area of Hove commemorates him.)

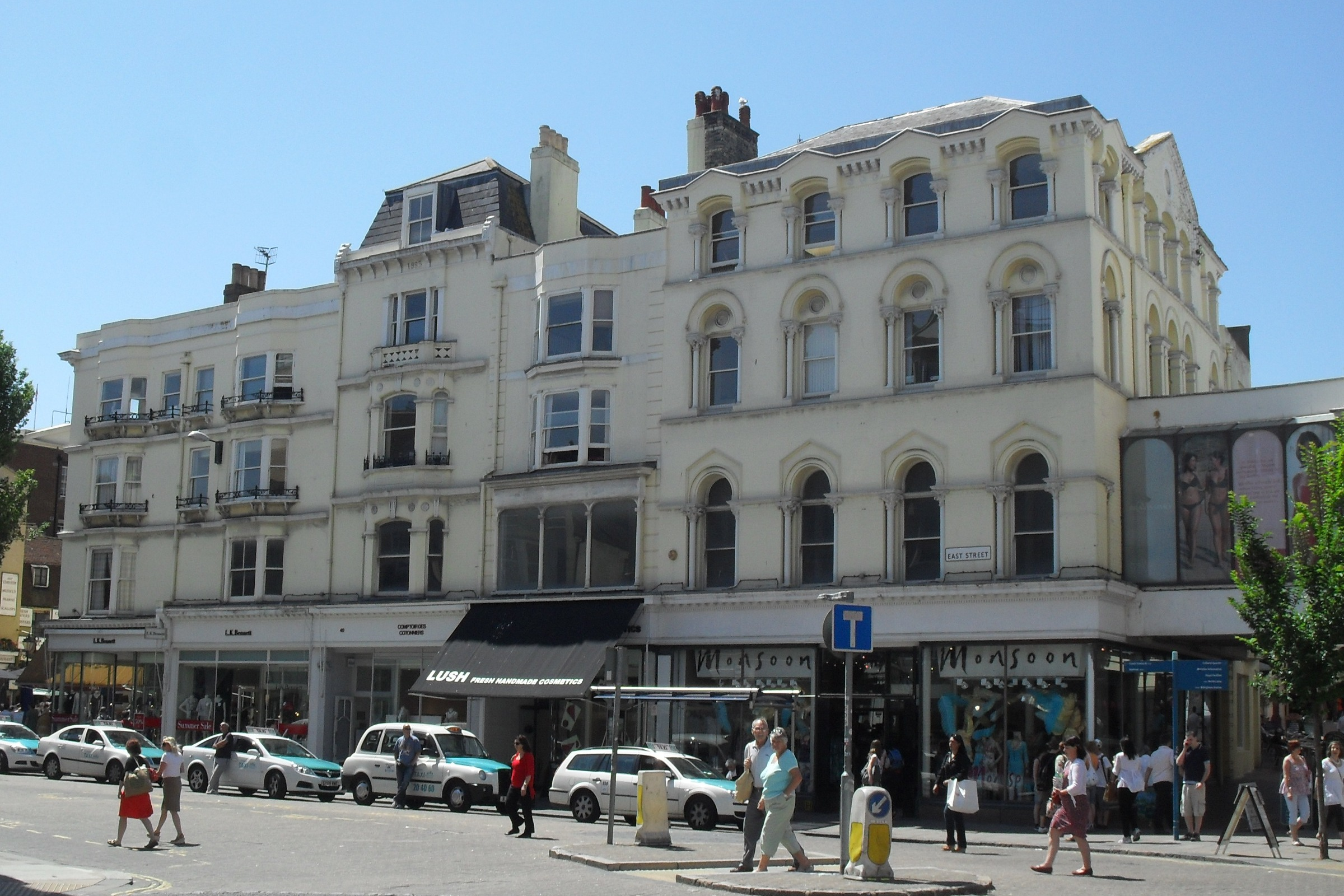
The store expanded into East Street in the 1880s with the acquisition of numbers 41 and 42 (right).

In 1862, Charles Hannington acquired two more buildings on North Street. At this point he decided to unite all the North Street shop units into a single store with a common architectural theme, and he commissioned architect William Russell to do this. He also diversified the business further: new departments included a furnishing and curtain-making service, a carpet-cleaning service (based on a building in Lewes Road and featuring the most advanced machinery in the country) and a furniture storage and removals service. As this department grew, a large purpose-built furniture depository was needed, and local architects Clayton & Black designed a distinctive domed building for this purpose. A site on Davigdor Road in Hove was found in 1898, the land was bought in 1901, and construction continued until 1904.

Number 1 North Street stands on a "prestigious" site at the corner of East Street, another of Brighton's medieval streets. In 1882, a year after Charles Hannington died and his son Samuel took over, the store was expanded around the corner when numbers 41 and 42 East Street were acquired. This was followed by the acquisition of more properties in the 1890s and 1900s: number 1 Market Street and part of number 53, and every building on the south side of North Street up to number 12. He also installed electric lighting and a telephone line in the store—both of which were almost unknown in Brighton at the time. Staff facilities were also progressive: a social club, library, annual outings, on-site living accommodation and "well above average" wages were offered. In 1896, Hanningtons became a public limited company, but the family connection remained: Samuel was the managing director and his son Charles was his deputy. Further income was generated by continuing to lease some of the acquired properties to their existing tenants. For example, the Brighton Union Bank was founded in 1805 and became Brighton's most important private bank of the 19th century. Barclays took it over in 1894, by which time it occupied 6–9 North Street; Hanningtons bought the freehold of these units in the 1890s, but only in 1959 did these buildings become part of Hanningtons. Likewise numbers 13 and 14 were occupied by a Lyons tea room until 1954.

== Competition ==
Hanningtons was a mid-market retailer, offering both ready-to-wear and bespoke clothing as well as many other services, and several competitors emerged locally from the late 19th century. In 1898, Sharman's Drapery converted the ground floor of Gothic House on Western Road into a department store, which was later taken over by the Plummer Roddis group; Knight and Wakefield's store opened soon afterwards on the same road; and in Palmeira Square, Hill's of Hove offered an alternative for Hove residents. Later came the Maples store and Vokin's, also on North Street. In response, Hanningtons began to advertise extensively at this time. Newspapers, fashion magazines and motor buses regularly carried advertisements for the store, advertising postcards were produced, and a large billboard was erected near Brighton railway station in 1900, intended to be visible from incoming trains. A newspaper advertisement of that era list Hanningtons' products and services as "Haberdashers, Woollen and Linen Drapers, Carpet and Furniture Warehousemen, Family and General Mourning [Clothes], Undertakers, House and Estate Agents, Auctioneers, Valuers etc.". Later in the 20th century, such diverse new departments as bespoke school uniforms, specialist costumery, fur coats and gramophones were introduced. Also, Hanningtons were a pioneer in the concept of in-store concessions, where companies providing certain specialist products were given space in the store in exchange for a commission on every sale. Another innovation was the layout adopted in the furniture department, where items were placed in realistic settings imitating the rooms of a house—a rare concept outside of high-end stores in London. In contrast, it was not until the early 20th century that a "deferred payment scheme" was introduced, many years after such schemes became popular: the founder Smith Hannington had been opposed to offering goods on credit.

== Postwar period ==
The Hanningtons store was damaged in one of the many bombing raids of the Brighton Blitz. On 29 November 1940, number 1 was severely damaged, but there were no casualties. Normal service resumed after the war, and expansion continued at first: Hanningtons Motors was founded on the site of the present Van Alen Building on the seafront. Its services included limousine hire. However, the 1960s were a period of major change. The store passed out of the Hannington family's control when its last member, Dorothy Hannington, died in 1966. She set up a charitable trust to operate the store on behalf of the Royal London Hospital and the Royal Sussex County Hospital; but in 1969 this was disbanded and the store was sold for £1,005,000 to property company South Bank Estates. Parts of the business were sold off and some buildings disposed of, in particular the furniture depository at Hove (this was sold to Legal & General and was converted into offices in 1972), but all staff were retained by the new owners. The new owners retained close links with the Royal Sussex County Hospital and other healthcare institutions such as the Brighton Health Committee and St John Ambulance, reflecting the late Dorothy Hannington's interest in that area.

The disparate buildings on North Street, Market Street and East Street were physically united in 1989 when a bridge was built at first-floor level across the pedestrianised Market Street in 1989. All but three of the departments, of which there were more than 50 by this time, could now be reached without going outside. This work took place after a major refurbishment necessitated by a major fire in April 1986. An arsonist set fire to a restaurant attached to the back of Hanningtons, and the blaze spread from there through much of the store. It was closed for several weeks while the damage was repaired. An accidental fire inside the store caused more disruption in the mid-1990s; and around the same time came the redevelopment of the Churchill Square shopping centre a short walk from the store, which was expected to transform the rundown 1960s precinct into an ultra-modern covered mall with ample car parking. Hannington's central location on narrow, congested streets meant it had never been able to offer much parking space.

== Closure and legacy ==
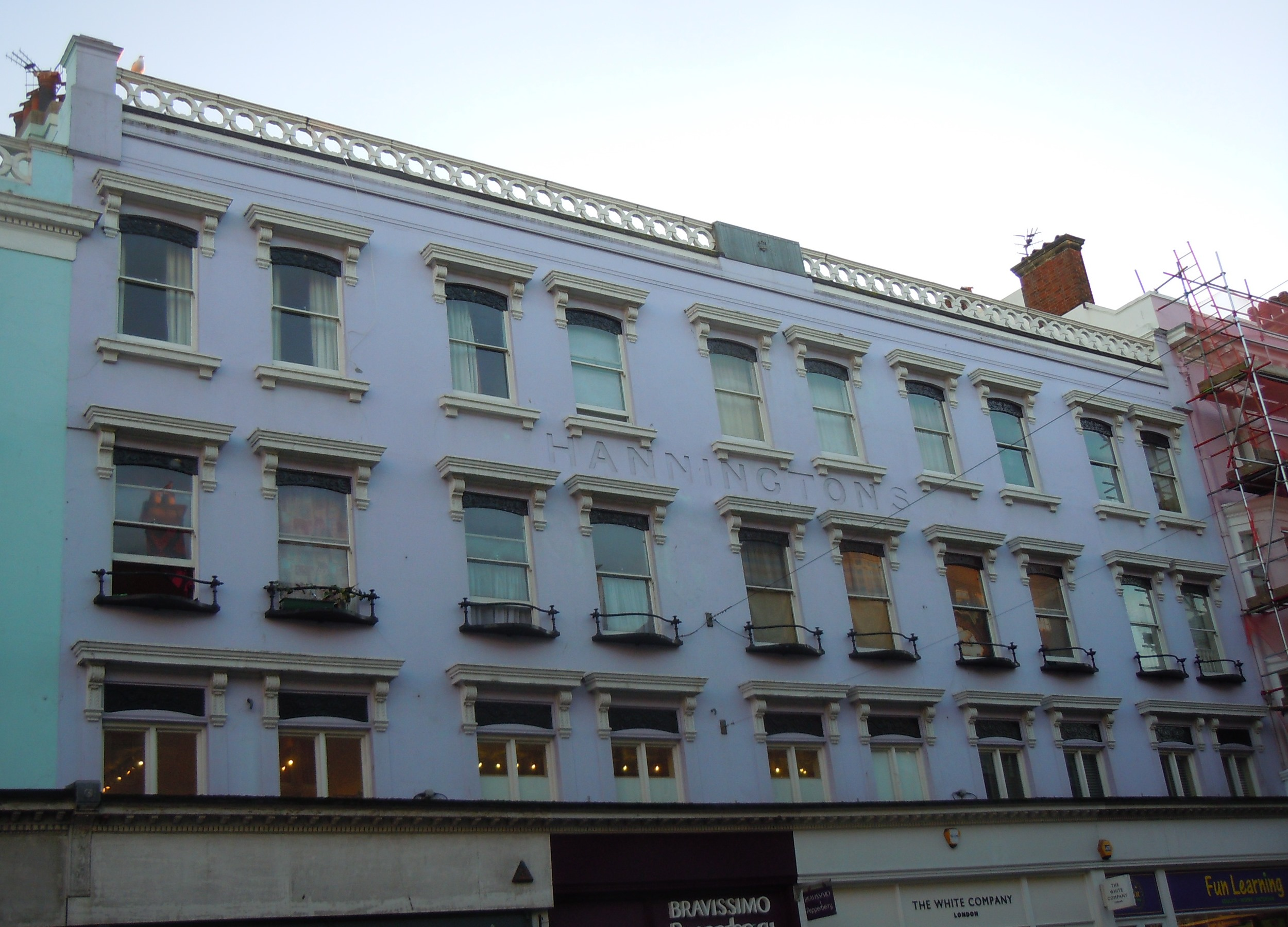
The Hanningtons name survives on the North Street façade.

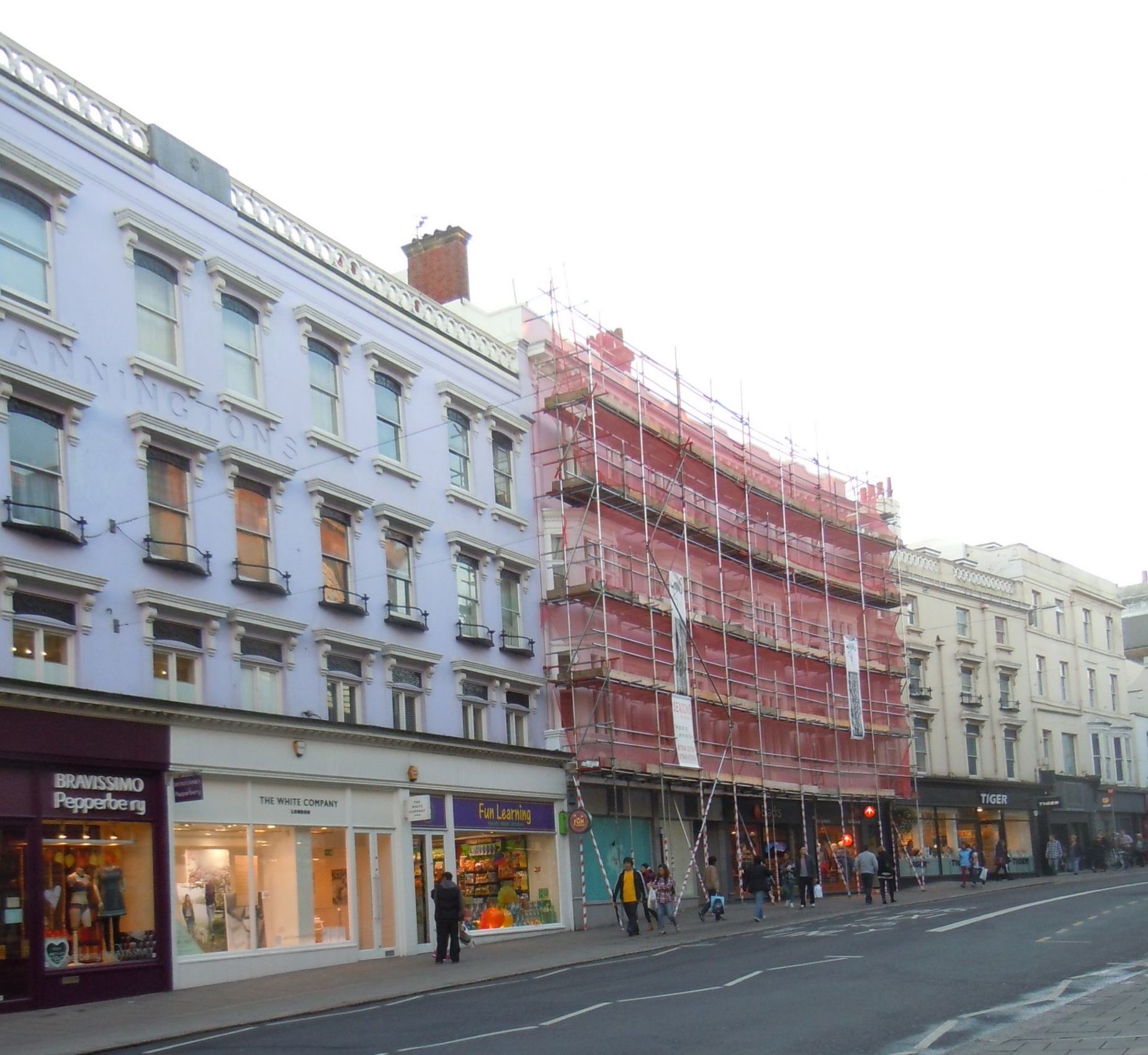
The North Street units (pictured in October 2014) have a variety of occupants.

Hanningtons was the last survivor of Brighton and Hove's large independent department stores: all the others had closed since the 1980s. Contributing factors included the increased popularity of out-of-town shopping centres, the opening of large town-centre malls such as County Mall at Crawley in 1992 and the rebuilt Churchill Square itself in 1998, and the emergence of designer outlet centres such as McArthurGlen Ashford. In 2001, the directors decided to close the store and sell the buildings. The last day of trading was 30 June 2001, but a full-scale sale took place for weeks beforehand. In July 2004, all the fixtures and fittings of the store were auctioned. The store was reopened temporarily, and "a large crowd gathered" to bid for the 750 lots—some of which sold for many times higher than their guide price.

A property investment company called Regina Estates bought the premises for £23.5 million in 2000. However, by June 2014, RBS Real Estate Asset Management (part of The Royal Bank of Scotland) owned all of the former Hanningtons buildings on North Street, along with nearby buildings such as Huntingdon House, an adjacent office block. Regina Estates received planning permission to divide the building into smaller shop units, and as of October 2014 various tenants occupied the individual units:

- 1–2 North Street: Kurt Geiger (footwear retailer)
- 3 North Street: Bravissimo (lingerie retailer)
- 4 North Street: The White Company (homeware retailer)
- 5 North Street: Sorriso (women's clothing)
- 6–7 North Street: lululemon
- 8–10 North St: Blacks (outdoor goods retailer)
- 11–12 North Street: Tiger (variety store)

Many of the units were empty until 2004, but in that year several high-end fashion retailers established themselves in the East Street part of the building: L.K.Bennett, United Colors of Benetton, Mango and—in the prominent corner site facing Castle Square—Kurt Geiger. The other units along North Street were said in 2004 to be occupied by "a succession of short-term lets". The units at 39–42 East Street, the Grade II-listed section, were occupied by clothing retailer Monsoon by 2010, but in July 2014 the store moved to the Churchill Square shopping centre.

Hanningtons' funeral director business has moved to Hove but continues to trade. The former Hanningtons Furniture Depository on Davigdor Road, which was sold off in 1969, was sold to the Legal & General Assurance Society, for whom it was converted into an "elegant" office in 1972. They occupied the building until 2005, after which it remained empty until it was converted into the Montefiore Hospital in 2011–12.

Brighton Museum & Art Gallery holds items including a Hanningtons bag, a silk and wool bodice made in the 1870s, and an 1890s satin mourning mantle. These garments would have been handmade in the store.

For many years in the 19th century, and continuing into the early 20th century, Hanningtons supplied clothing to residents of the Percy and Wagner Almshouses on Lewes Road, a set of almshouses established in 1795 and added to in 1859. They were for poor widows and unmarried women within the parish of Brighton. Hanningtons provided each resident with two gowns valued between 12 and 15 shillings and a duffel cloak "not to exceed in value 21 shillings nor less than 18 shillings" in alternate years, and a black bonnet not exceeding 10 shillings in value once every three years. This later changed to two gowns and bonnets every year and a duffel cloak once every three years.

The section of the store facing East Street was listed at Grade II on 19 October 1994. English Heritage defines Grade II-listed buildings as "nationally important and of special interest". As of February 2001, there were 1,124 Grade II-listed buildings and structures, and 1,218 listed buildings of all grades, in the city of Brighton and Hove.

=== Hanningtons Lane ===
In February 2017, European retail real estate investment manager Redevco began work redeveloping much of the old Hanningtons building on North Street into a new lane named in its honour. In May 2019, Hanningtons Lane opened with 13 new individual shop spaces as well as new office space and apartments above. A new entrance to the Lanes was created, opening out Hanningtons Lane from North Street. Many of the North Street shops which had once formed part of Hanningtons have also been redeveloped as part of this project, with new tenants including Habitat, Oliver Bonas and Watches of Switzerland.

== Architecture ==
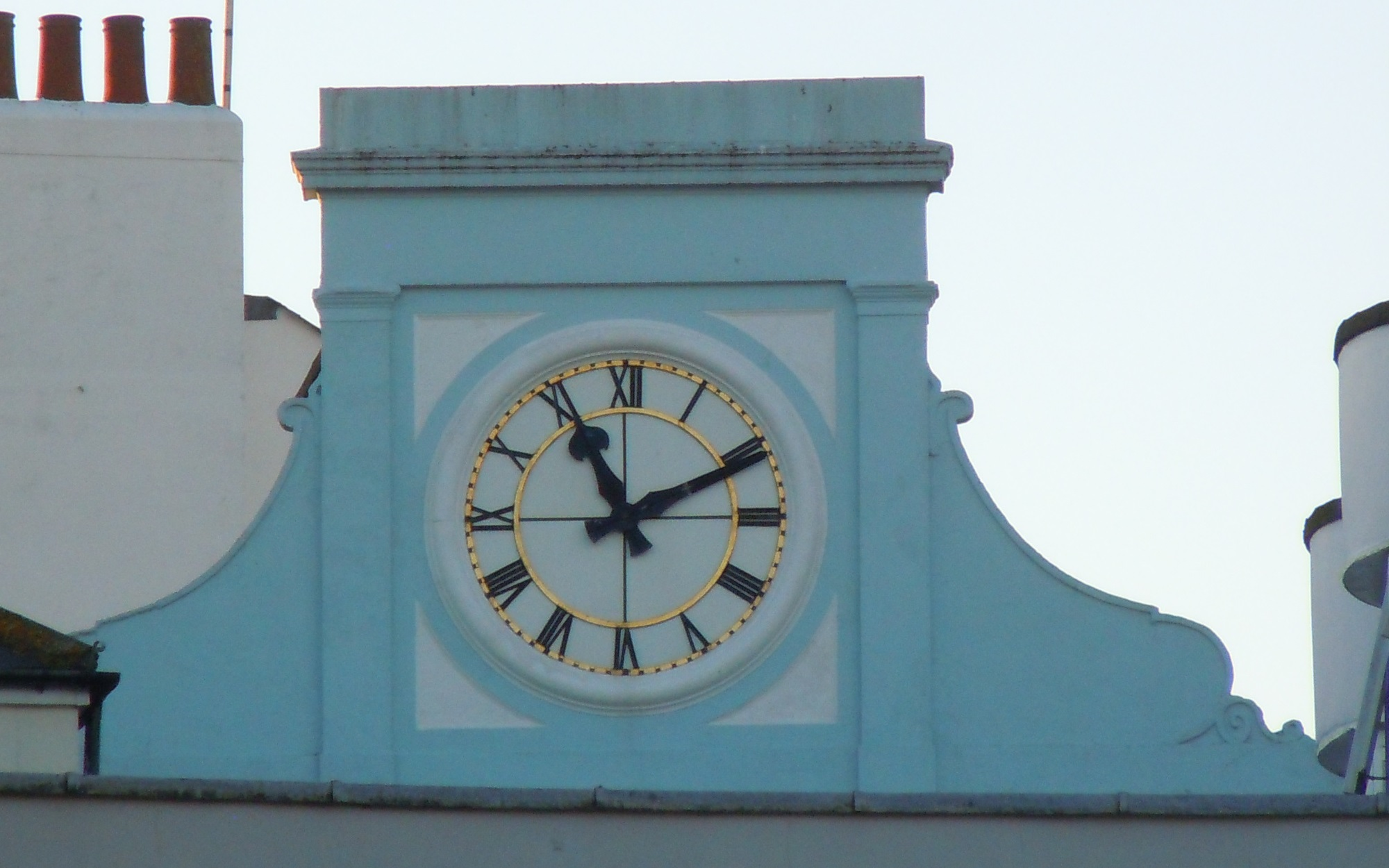
This large clock is above the bridge over Market Street.

The long façade of the former store "dominates the south side of North Street". The frontage to East Street is similar to many of the buildings on that ancient, important street, where "modern shopfronts [have been] inserted into the ground floors of Victorian shells".

The Grade II-listed section fronting East Street was designed in about 1866 by Henry Jarvis in a High Victorian Gothic style. It rises to four storeys with a shop unit at ground-floor level and a four-window range to each level above. The windows are treated differently at each level, although all are deeply recessed into aediculae. At first-floor level, the form of the aedicule is a simple round arch with a slightly recessed pointed tympanum. The arches are supported on thin columns whose capitals are connected by a horizontal band. On the floor above, the round-arched section consists of an architrave into which a roundel is set, and an arched hood mould. There are again columns with foliage capitals. The top-floor windows have a much shallower segmental arch. Projecting in front of and above them are triangular gables supported on corbels; these project slightly beyond the parapet. The roof is recessed behind this. The north-facing side of this building faces Market Street and is partly blocked from view by the bridge built in 1989 to connect the North Street and East Street sections of the store. It is similar to the main (east-facing) elevation but also has a shallow three-bay pediment. The walls are of painted brick (possibly polychromatic originally) laid in the Flemish bond pattern.

The rear section of the store faces Brighton Place and was redesigned in the mid-20th century by local architect John Leopold Denman. His are the series of arched windows and corner tower topped with a hexagonal turret. The units at 6–9 North Street, built for the Brighton Union Bank in 1896 to the design of architect Arthur Keen, have prominent bay windows with large mullions and transoms.

== See also ==
- Grade II listed buildings in Brighton and Hove: E–H

== Bibliography ==
- Antram, Nicholas; Morrice, Richard (2008). Brighton and Hove. Pevsner Architectural Guides. London: Yale University Press. ISBN 978-0-300-12661-7.
- Bond, Sidonie (2002). Hanningtons: A Brief History 1808–2001. Seaford: S.B. Publications. ISBN 1-85770-252-2.
- Brighton Polytechnic. School of Architecture and Interior Design (1987). A Guide to the Buildings of Brighton. Macclesfield: McMillan Martin. ISBN 1-869865-03-0.
- Carder, Timothy (1990). The Encyclopaedia of Brighton. Lewes: East Sussex County Libraries. ISBN 0-86147-315-9.
- Dale, Antony (1950). The History and Architecture of Brighton. Brighton: Bredin & Heginbothom Ltd.
- Jones, Lavender; Pollard, Jacqueline (1999). Hilly Laine to Hanover: a Brighton Neighbourhood. Brighton: Brighton Books Publishing. ISBN 978-1-901454-04-8.
- Middleton, Judy (2002). The Encyclopaedia of Hove & Portslade. Brighton: Brighton & Hove Libraries.
- Musgrave, Clifford (1981). Life in Brighton. Rochester: Rochester Press. ISBN 0-571-09285-3.
- Rowland, David (1997). The Brighton Blitz. Seaford: S.B. Publications. ISBN 1-85770-124-0.
- Various authors (2009). The Story of Queen's Park Brighton. Brighton: Brighton Town Press. ISBN 978-1-901454-12-3.
