= 1963 Leeds City Council election =

1963 English local government election

The 1963 Leeds municipal elections were held on Thursday 9 May 1963, with one third of the council to be elected.

The Liberals significantly expanded on their prior year's record showing of 10 candidates to 18 candidates this time, obtaining them post-war records in votes and vote share. This hidden a disappointing result for them, seeing swings away from them in the wards they'd fought previously, with Far Headingley the only ward they managed to retain second place in (as well as gaining second place on first standing in Wellington).

This Liberal advancement again mainly hurt the Conservative vote, helping Labour achieve a 2.3% swing to make six gains – reversing all but one of the gains the Tories made in their 1960 victory (the exception being the usually reliable Conservative ward of Harehills, which Labour managed to narrowly gain in 1957). These gains doubled Labour's majority of councillors – with their overall majority now at 28 – as the party made widespread gains nationally to capture a record number of borough seats.

== Election result ==
Leeds local election result 1963
Party	Seats	Gains	Losses	Net gain/loss	Seats %	Votes %	Votes	+/−
Labour	19	6	0	+6	67.8	45.0	57,636	+1.1
Conservative	9	0	6	-6	32.1	40.2	51,513	-3.5
Liberal	0	0	0	0	0.0	13.9	17,865	+2.6
Communist	0	0	0	0	0.0	0.9	1,167	-0.2

The result had the following consequences for the total number of seats on the council after the elections:

Party	Previous council		New council	
Party	Cllr	Ald	Cllr	Ald
Labour	47	16	54	16
Conservatives	37	12	30	12
Total	84	28	84	28
Total	112		112	
Working majority	12	4	24	4
Working majority	16		28	

== Ward results ==
Allerton
Party	Candidate	Votes	%	±%
Conservative	Bernard Lyons	3,815	63.6	−0.2
Labour	Gerald Bloom	1,147	19.1	+4.4
Liberal	Julius Blum	1,034	17.2	−4.2
Majority		2,668	44.5	+2.2
Turnout		5,996		
Conservative hold		Swing	-2.3	

Armley
Party	Candidate	Votes	%	±%
Labour	Sidney Lee	2,542	55.4	−4.9
Conservative	Robert Rowland Beal	1,289	28.1	−11.7
Liberal	Graham Rowlands	759	16.5	+16.5
Majority		1,253	27.3	+6.8
Turnout		4,590		
Labour hold		Swing	+3.4	

Beeston
Party	Candidate	Votes	%	±%
Labour	A. Beevers	3,453	47.7	−1.1
Conservative	A. Farrell	2,974	41.1	−10.1
Liberal	H. Passmore	730	10.1	+10.1
Communist	M. Moore	84	1.2	+1.2
Majority		479	6.6	+4.3
Turnout		7,241		
Labour gain from Conservative		Swing	+4.5	

Blenheim
Party	Candidate	Votes	%	±%
Labour	Ernest Morris	1,612	69.8	−1.4
Conservative	J. Jenkinson	696	30.2	+1.4
Majority		916	39.6	−2.8
Turnout		2,308		
Labour hold		Swing	-1.4	

Bramley
Party	Candidate	Votes	%	±%
Labour	M. Chadwick	2,732	46.9	−6.7
Conservative	C. Dean	2,198	37.8	−8.6
Liberal	M. Stevens	891	15.3	+15.3
Majority		534	9.2	+1.9
Turnout		5,821		
Labour gain from Conservative		Swing	+0.9	

Burmantofts
Party	Candidate	Votes	%	±%
Labour	F. Watson	2,299	74.2	+0.2
Conservative	M. Bauchop	798	25.8	−0.2
Majority		1,501	48.5	+0.4
Turnout		3,097		
Labour hold		Swing	+0.2	

City
Party	Candidate	Votes	%	±%
Labour	W. Stoner	1,299	73.1	+1.7
Conservative	A. Roberts	477	26.9	−1.7
Majority		822	46.3	+3.4
Turnout		1,776		
Labour hold		Swing	+1.7	

Cross Gates
Party	Candidate	Votes	%	±%
Labour	L. Jackson	3,603	69.4	+9.7
Conservative	E. Hartley	1,592	30.6	−4.0
Majority		2,011	38.7	+13.7
Turnout		5,195		
Labour hold		Swing	+6.8	

East Hunslet
Party	Candidate	Votes	%	±%
Labour	E. Haughton	1,800	72.5	+9.4
Conservative	P. Sharples	683	27.5	+7.3
Majority		1,117	45.0	+2.1
Turnout		2,483		
Labour hold		Swing	+1.0	

Far Headingley
Party	Candidate	Votes	%	±%
Conservative	George Somers	4,639	46.0	−1.5
Liberal	John Humphrey Morrish	3,728	37.0	−1.2
Labour	Kathleen Elizabeth Lloyd	1,707	16.9	+2.8
Majority		911	9.0	−0.3
Turnout		10,074		
Conservative hold		Swing	-0.1	

Halton
Party	Candidate	Votes	%	±%
Conservative	J. Brooksbank	3,754	71.6	+8.3
Labour	C. Wigley	1,486	28.4	+9.6
Majority		2,268	43.3	−1.3
Turnout		5,240		
Conservative hold		Swing	-0.6	

Harehills
Party	Candidate	Votes	%	±%
Conservative	John Astle	2,427	51.2	−9.9
Labour	D. Beeston	1,693	35.7	−3.1
Liberal	Ronald Gibbon Sissons	616	13.0	+13.0
Majority		734	15.5	−6.8
Turnout		4,736		
Conservative hold		Swing	-3.4	

Holbeck
Party	Candidate	Votes	%	±%
Labour	T. Smith	2,117	58.6	−9.8
Conservative	A. Redmond	877	24.3	−7.3
Liberal	J. Crawshaw	490	13.6	+13.6
Communist	B. Potter	130	3.6	+3.6
Majority		1,240	34.3	−2.5
Turnout		3,614		
Labour hold		Swing	-1.2	

Hunslet Carr
Party	Candidate	Votes	%	±%
Labour	Harry Booth	2,008	62.8	−3.1
Conservative	R. Austwick	770	24.1	−2.5
Liberal	G. McKenna	305	9.5	+9.5
Communist	L. Hunter	115	3.6	−4.0
Majority		1,238	38.7	−0.6
Turnout		3,198		
Labour hold		Swing	-0.3	

Hyde Park
Party	Candidate	Votes	%	±%
Conservative	Kenneth Davison	2,125	44.7	−16.5
Labour	Joyce Gould	1,695	35.7	−3.2
Liberal	Sydney Herbert Bexan	934	19.6	+19.6
Majority		430	9.0	−13.4
Turnout		4,754		
Conservative hold		Swing	-6.6	

Kirkstall
Party	Candidate	Votes	%	±%
Labour	M. Happold	2,665	53.3	+1.1
Conservative	G. Lockwood	1,499	30.0	+0.6
Liberal	D. Whittaker	668	13.3	−5.1
Communist	B. Huffingley	172	3.4	+3.4
Majority		1,166	23.3	+0.5
Turnout		5,004		
Labour hold		Swing	+0.2	

Meanwood
Party	Candidate	Votes	%	±%
Conservative	Alan Pedley	3,146	54.1	+0.2
Labour	J. McPheat	1,613	27.7	+7.6
Liberal	Ms. Holdsworth	1,054	18.1	−7.8
Majority		1,533	26.4	−1.6
Turnout		5,813		
Conservative hold		Swing	+3.7	

Middleton
Party	Candidate	Votes	%	±%
Labour	Arthur Brown	2,538	77.1	+0.6
Conservative	J. Charlesworth	405	12.3	−5.9
Liberal	J. Ward	221	6.7	+6.7
Communist	R. Wilkinson	129	3.9	−1.4
Majority		2,133	64.8	+6.5
Turnout		3,293		
Labour hold		Swing	+3.2	

Moortown
Party	Candidate	Votes	%	±%
Conservative	S. Bolton	4,324	59.7	−2.9
Labour	J. Taylor	1,732	23.9	+6.2
Liberal	J. Pearlman	1,192	16.4	−3.3
Majority		2,592	35.8	−7.0
Turnout		7,248		
Conservative hold		Swing	-4.5	

Osmondthorpe
Party	Candidate	Votes	%	±%
Labour	Douglas Gabb	2,161	76.8	+2.0
Conservative	B. Wilson	653	23.2	−2.0
Majority		1,508	53.6	+3.9
Turnout		2,814		
Labour hold		Swing	+2.0	

Potternewton
Party	Candidate	Votes	%	±%
Conservative	D. Bradley	1,427	45.5	−7.0
Labour	R. Taylor	1,110	35.4	+10.1
Liberal	John Brian Meeks	489	15.6	−3.6
Communist	H. Fawcett	112	3.6	+0.5
Majority		317	10.1	−17.1
Turnout		3,138		
Conservative hold		Swing	-8.5	

Richmond Hill
Party	Candidate	Votes	%	±%
Labour	M. Rooney	2,240	80.0	+2.6
Conservative	H. Flockton	430	15.4	−1.9
Communist	E. Burwin	131	4.7	−0.7
Majority		1,810	64.6	+4.6
Turnout		2,801		
Labour hold		Swing	+2.2	

Roundhay
Party	Candidate	Votes	%	±%
Conservative	D. Wolstenholme	3,002	59.9	+2.9
Labour	D. Thomas	1,087	21.7	+4.9
Liberal	A. Clarke	925	18.4	−7.7
Majority		1,915	38.2	+7.4
Turnout		5,014		
Conservative hold		Swing	-2.0	

Stanningley
Party	Candidate	Votes	%	±%
Labour	Kevin Gould	2,552	43.2	+4.8
Conservative	A. Vickers	1,680	28.5	−0.0
Liberal	Dennis Pedder	1,673	28.3	−4.7
Majority		872	14.8	+9.4
Turnout		5,905		
Labour gain from Conservative		Swing	+2.4	

Wellington
Party	Candidate	Votes	%	±%
Labour	Aimee Tong	1,894	67.6	−8.2
Liberal	B. Freeman	436	15.6	+15.6
Conservative	A. Stephen	331	11.8	−4.7
Communist	J. Bellamy	141	5.0	−2.7
Majority		1,458	52.0	−7.2
Turnout		2,802		
Labour hold		Swing	-11.9	

Westfield
Party	Candidate	Votes	%	±%
Labour	J. Bell	1,649	53.8	−3.4
Conservative	May Sexton	1,415	46.2	+3.4
Majority		234	7.6	−6.8
Turnout		3,064		
Labour gain from Conservative		Swing	-3.4	

Woodhouse
Party	Candidate	Votes	%	±%
Labour	R. Ellis	2,274	54.0	+0.2
Conservative	F. West	1,326	31.5	−10.7
Liberal	F. Smith	459	10.9	+10.9
Communist	A. Dale	153	3.6	−0.4
Majority		948	22.5	+10.9
Turnout		4,212		
Labour gain from Conservative		Swing	+5.4	

Wortley
Party	Candidate	Votes	%	±%
Labour	J. Moynihan	2,928	42.1	−7.9
Conservative	Bertrand Mather	2,761	39.7	−10.2
Liberal	J. Sherwin	1,261	18.1	+18.1
Majority		167	2.4	+2.3
Turnout		6,950		
Labour gain from Conservative		Swing	+1.1	

== Casual Vacancies ==
Halton 27 June 1963
Party	Candidate	Votes	%	±%
Conservative	John Hutchings Rhodes	2501	74.6%	
Labour	Clement Wigley	853	25.4%	
Majority		1,648	49.2%	
Turnout		3,354	22.2%	
Conservative hold		Swing		

Roundhay 27 June 1963
Party	Candidate	Votes	%	±%
Labour	Douglas Thomas	1,774	45.4%	
Conservative	Bertrand Mather	1,712	43.8%	
Liberal	Arthur Clarke	424	10.8%	
Majority		62	1.6%	
Turnout		3,910	24.1%	
Labour gain from Conservative		Swing		
