= Thompsons Solicitors =

Law firms of the United Kingdom

Thompsons Solicitors, formerly Robin Thompson & Partners, is a large firm of solicitors founded in 1921 with longstanding links to the trade union movement. It is 45th on the list of largest United Kingdom-based law firms. It specialises in personal injury claims and employment law, and only acts for claimants.

== Background ==
The Black Solicitors Network's Diversity League Table in 2009 found the firm had the largest proportion of women and lawyers from an ethnic minority background of the top 100 firms in the UK. It moved its Birmingham offices to Embassy House in Church Street in April 2017.

Numerous Labour Party politicians have worked for the firm, including Mick Antoniw, Jo Stevens, Vicky Phillips, Vaughan Gething, Rob Marris and Andy McDonald. Lord John Monks is a non executive director of the firm.

It has been involved in many leading cases, especially in relation to UK labour law, including Williams v Compair Maxam Ltd and personal injuries. In the case of Ian Paterson it secured compensation totalling £1,987,000 for 89 NHS patients treated by Mr Paterson at the Heart of England NHS Foundation Trust and is acting for 350 patients treated privately at Spire Healthcare.

It is often a participant in Workers' Memorial Day ceremonies in the UK.

In September 2019 Thompsons' staff voted overwhelmingly in favour of strike action, following the offer of a below-inflation 2% pay rise. 89% voted Yes, on a 72 per cent turn out. GMB union sources told the Morning Star that members had consistently accepted below inflation pay deals in the past but were angered this year as the firm's accounts had shown significant profits.
