= Irwin Bellow, Baron Bellwin =

British politician (1923-2001)

The Right Honourable The Lord Bellwin JP DL

Minister of State for Local Government
- In office 6 January 1983 – 11 September 1984
- Prime Minister: Margaret Thatcher
- Preceded by: Tom King
- Succeeded by: Kenneth Baker

Parliamentary Under-Secretary of State for Environment
- In office 7 May 1979 – 6 January 1983
- Prime Minister: Margaret Thatcher
- Preceded by: Kenneth Marks
- Succeeded by: no appointment

Member of the House of Lords
- Lord Temporal
- Life peerage 21 May 1979 – 11 February 2001

Leader of Leeds City Council
- In office 1975–1979
- Preceded by: Sir Albert King
- Succeeded by: Peter Sparling

Leeds City Councillor for Talbot Ward
- In office 1973–1980
- Preceded by: P. Brayshay or R. Crousden
- Succeeded by: Ward abolished

Leeds City Councillor for Chapel Allerton Ward Potternewton (1965-1968)
- In office 1965–1973
- Preceded by: L. Lyons
- Succeeded by: Ward abolished

Personal details
- Born: Irwin Norman Bellow; 7 February 1923 Leeds, England
- Died: 11 February 2001 (aged 78)
- Party: Conservative
- Spouse: Doreen Saperia
- Children: 3
- Education: Leeds Grammar School
- Alma mater: University of Leeds

Irwin Norman Bellow, Baron Bellwin JP DL (7 February 1923 – 11 February 2001) was a British Conservative politician.

== Biography ==
Bellow was born to a Jewish family in Leeds, and was educated at Leeds Grammar School and the University of Leeds, where he read Law. He then joined the family's sewing-machine firm. Bellow served as the Leader of the Leeds City Council from 1975 to 1979. As council leader, he sold 3,000 council houses and cut rates, which brought him to the attention of Margaret Thatcher.

On 21 May 1979, he was created a life peer as Baron Bellwin, of the City of Leeds. Between 1979 and 1983, Bellwin served as Parliamentary Under-Secretary of State at the Department of the Environment under Michael Heseltine. Between 1983 and 1984 he was Minister of State for the Environment (Local Government).

As a junior minister, Bellwin piloted 28 bills through the House of Lords, including the Thatcher government's 'Right to Buy' legislation and the Wildlife and Countryside Act 1981. He spoke more than 1,000 times in the Lords during the passage of Local Government, Planning and Land Act 1980. The Bellwin scheme, which he introduced in 1983, is named after him. He resigned from the government in 1984, allegedly because of his opposition to Margaret Thatcher's plans to abolish the Labour-dominated metropolitan county councils.

Bellwin was made a Justice of the Peace for Leeds in 1969 and became a Deputy Lieutenant for West Yorkshire in 1991. He was Master of the Worshipful Company of World Traders from 1988 to 1989.

He married Doreen Saperia in 1948; they had one son and two daughters.

== Arms ==
Coat of arms of Irwin Bellow, Baron Bellwin

Crest
Upon a wreath an owl guardant Azure beaked legged morally crowned and holding in the dexter claws a bell bendwise Gold.
Escutcheon
Azure in chief two bellows Argent garnished Or and in base a rose Argent barbed and seeded Proper a border Or fretty Azure.
Supporters
Dexter a ram Azure armed langued and tailed Or, sinister a lion rampant Azure armed crined langued and the tail tufted Or both with a collar Argent charged with triangles interlaced in pairs Azure.
Motto
Suas Quis Que Sciat Felicitates
