= Vicky Phillips =

Victoria Philips is a solicitor in the United Kingdom. She is head of the Employment Rights Unit at Thompsons Solicitors, having qualified as a solicitor in August 1996. She was previously president of the National Union of Students between 1986 and 1988.

She regularly gives talks and lectures on employment law to trade union clients and speaks at events organised by the Institute of Employment Rights. She also writes articles and commentary on employment law matters for Federation News and Equal Opportunities Review.

== Notable cases ==
- Commissioners of Inland Revenue v Ainsworth] (CA) [2005] IRLR 465 (referred by House of Lords to European Court of Justice hearing 20 November 2007) – Advocate General's Opinion due 24 January 2008) [Entitlement to paid annual leave].
- ASLEF v UK (ECHR) [2007] IRLR 361 [Rights of trade unions under Article 11 of the European Convention on Human Rights to exclude individuals from membership].

== Posts held ==
- 2004–present – Member and Executive Committee Member of the Industrial Law Society
- 1988–1993 - National Women’s Officer, Labour Party
- 1986–1988 - National President, National Union of Students
- 1985–1986 - President (Welfare), National Union of Students
- 1984–1985 - Member of Executive, National Union of Students
- 1983–1984 - President Students’ Union, University of East Anglia

Political offices
| Preceded by Phil Woolas | President of the National Union of Students; 1986–1988 | Succeeded by Maeve Sherlock |
Party political offices
| Preceded by Joyce Gould | National Women's Officer of the Labour Party; 1989–1992 | Succeeded by Deborah Lincoln |
