= Women's National Commission =

Defunct British public body

- Crown status

Non-departmental public body (NDPB) overview
- Formed: 1969
- Dissolved: 31 December 2010
- Minister responsible: Harriet Harman, Minister for Women and Equalities
- Non-departmental public body (NDPB) executive: Baroness Gould
- Parent department: Government Equalities Office
- Website: www.thewnc.org.uk www.wnc.equalities.gov.uk

The Women's National Commission (often shortened to WNC) was an advisory non-departmental public body (NDPB) set up in 1969 by former Prime Minister Harold Wilson to advise the United Kingdom's government on women's views, and to act as an umbrella body for UK-based women's groups in their dealings with government.

Until the 1990s, it was run by an executive, as voted for by its 'partners'. These were women's groups that had applied for and gained formal membership, the number of groups allowed to become members was limited to fifty. The government appointed a co-chair to manage the body, together with the elected chair.

After a review of the organisation in the late 1990s, it was relaunched as an NDPB. The government gave up its permanent co-chair position and removed the limit on the number of partner organisations it could have affiliated. Partners then ceased to have a formal role in running the body. The Minister for Women then became responsible for appointing a board of Commissioners and a Chair, who would represent all partners and the wider women's movement.

In July 2007, Harriet Harman, the newly appointed Minister for Women, announced that it would have a new role in consulting with women, to discover what they felt she should be doing as Minister. In October 2010, it was announced that the WNC would close on 31 December 2010 as part of the review of all NDPBs by the UK Government. It has now closed. A "legacy document" has been published to show the work that it had undertaken.
