= Spire Healthcare =

British private healthcare company

Spire Healthcare Group plc
- Company type: Public
- Traded as: LSE: SPI; FTSE 250 component
- Industry: Healthcare
- Founded: 2007; 19 years ago
- Headquarters: London, United Kingdom
- Key people: Garry Watts (chairman); Justin Ash (CEO)
- Revenue: ▲£1,579.8 million (2025)
- Operating income: ▲£150.5 million (2025)
- Net income: ▼£17.2 million (2025)
- Website: www.spirehealthcare.com

Spire Healthcare Group plc is the second-largest provider of private healthcare in the United Kingdom. It is listed on the London Stock Exchange and is a constituent of the FTSE 250 Index.

== History ==
Spire Healthcare was formed from the sale of Bupa Hospitals to Cinven in 2007, followed by the purchase of Classic Hospitals and Thames Valley Hospital in 2008. It was the subject of an initial public offering in July 2014.

== Facilities ==
Spire Healthcare operates a network of 38 private hospitals and ten clinics across the UK, as well as the London Fertility Centre.

In December 2022, it was announced Spire had acquired The Doctors Clinic Group, an occupational health services provider with over 700 corporate clients and operating 22 private GP clinics in the UK.

== Ian Paterson ==
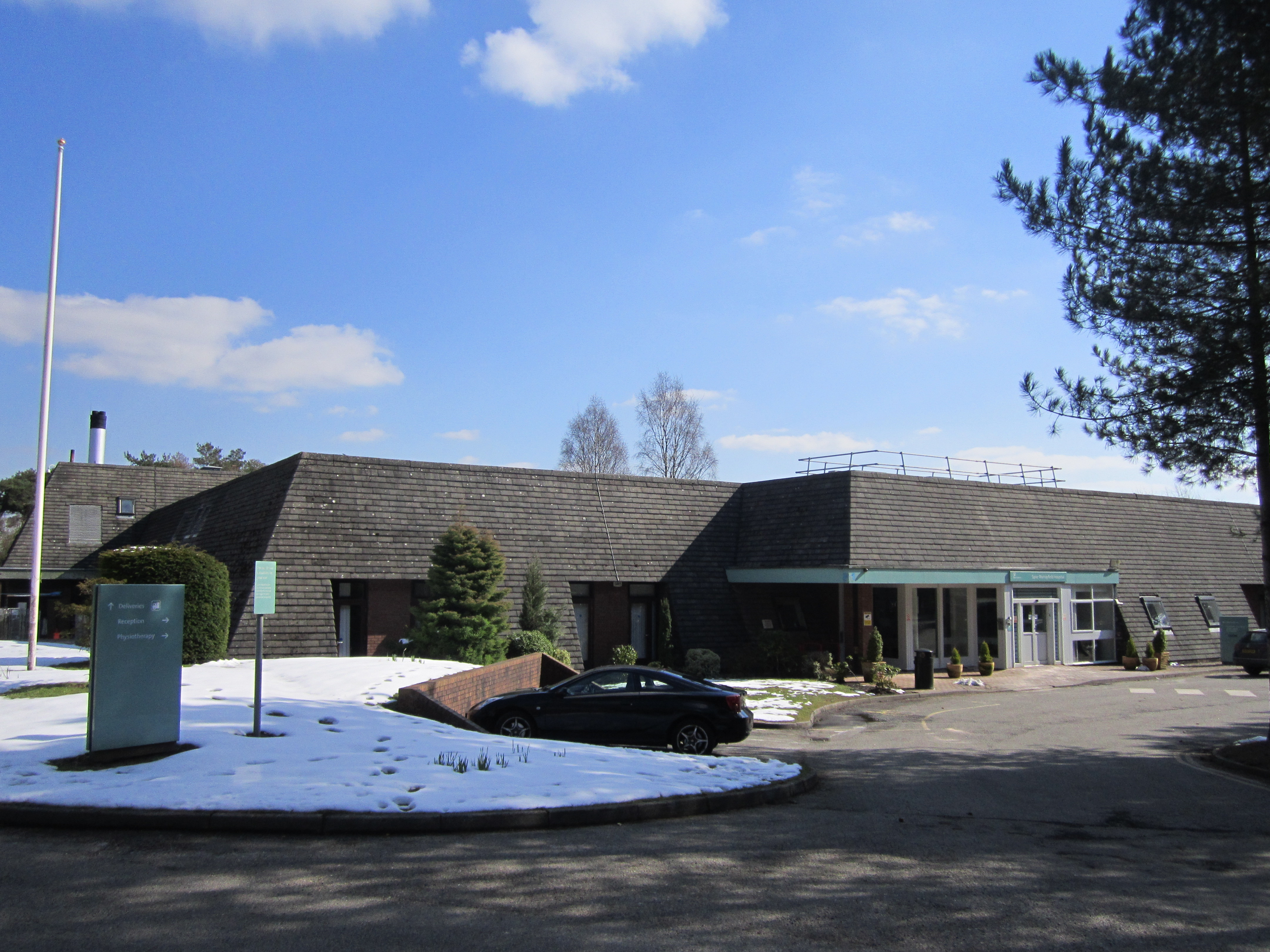
Spire Murrayfield Hospital, Wirral

Ian Paterson, a breast surgeon who worked at Bupa hospitals in Solihull and Sutton Coldfield, latterly run by Spire Healthcare, was convicted of 17 counts of wounding with intent to cause grievous bodily harm and three counts of unlawful wounding in respect of 10 patients. Hundreds of patients who had been treated privately at Spire clinics pursued civil action against him and against the company. According to Thompsons Solicitors, Spire had allowed him to operate well after 2012, when he had been suspended by the General Medical Council. Spire's statement was "What Mr Paterson did in our hospitals, in other private hospitals, and in the NHS absolutely should not have happened, and today justice has been done." Paterson was initially jailed for 15 years; the Court of Appeal later increased his sentence to 20 years, and £37 million was allocated for compensation.

An Independent Inquiry into the Issues raised by Paterson chaired by Graham James, a former Bishop of Norwich, was set up, and reported on 4 February 2020.

Spire initiated litigation in August 2017 against Heart of England NHS Foundation Trust claiming the trust's failure to warn it of concerns about Paterson's conduct was negligent and that the company relied on the NHS, as the primary employer, to tell it whether doctors were competent or whether there were patient safety concerns.

A Patient Services Support Line was set up by University Hospitals Birmingham for patients who had been treated by Paterson; Spire Healthcare also set up a dedicated phone line.

In February 2023 a further 1,500 Spire patients who had possibly received negligent treatment from Paterson were recalled by health officials after an old IT database was discovered.

== Spire and the NHS ==
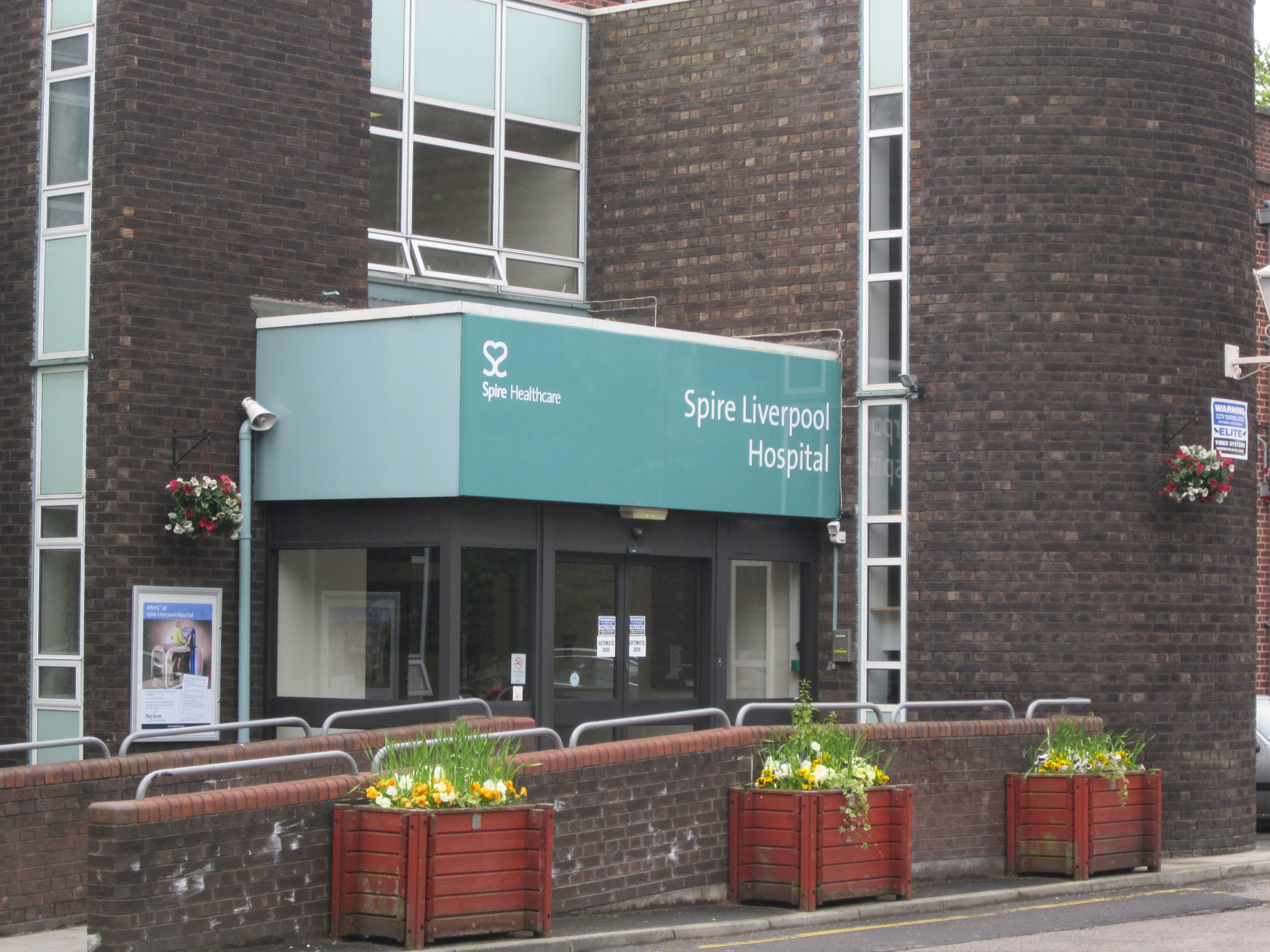
Spire Liverpool Hospital

In 2021, it generated about 30% of its revenues from contracts with the NHS.

The company alleged in 2013 that a block contract agreed between Blackpool Teaching Hospitals NHS Foundation Trust and the Clinical Commissioning Groups in Blackpool, and Fylde and Wyre offered a "clear incentive" for GPs to refer patients to the foundation trust and that this was anticompetitive behaviour. The contract provided the trust with a guaranteed income regardless of the number of patients that chose to use its services. Monitor conducted an investigation and decided that there was no evidence to support the claim, though they did conclude that Blackpool CCG's plans did not "go far enough" to ensure patients would be offered choice, or that the right to choice would be "publicised and promoted".

Its NHS business grew from £262 million in 2015 to £293 million in 2016. 20% is directly commissioned by NHS trusts and 80% comes from patients using the NHS e-Referral Service. Income from medical insurers reduced 1.3% to £429 million. Direct payments by patients increased 9% to £170 million. In 2017 turnover increased 0.6% to £932 million, but NHS-funded income fell 1.9% to £287.8 million. The company's pre-tax profit in 2018 fell by 64% because of lower NHS income and higher costs. The company reported record revenue of £1.1 billion for 2021, but it made a financial loss of £9 million after tax, and was £225 million in debt. Increased self-pay treatment helped boost the Group's revenue by 12.8%. NHS income was £314.5 million in 2021, up from £285.7 million in 2019, but a smaller proportion of the total due to strong growth in the self-pay market.

It was accused by the Royal College of Anaesthetists of being "extremely uncooperative" in facilitating the training of young clinicians during the COVID-19 pandemic in the United Kingdom.

Spire runs a successful nursing apprenticeship programme in partnership with the University of Sunderland and is beginning to be involved in medical training.

== BBC Panorama investigation ==
Spire was the subject of a critical BBC Panorama investigation in April 2024, which raised safety concerns around NHS patients being treated in its hospitals. Panorama showed an increasing number of NHS patients were undergoing surgery in Spire hospitals where no intensive care facilities were present. Some medical staff were under contract to work 168 hours a week, over three times higher than the NHS's recommended limit.

== Awards ==
In 2008 Spire Healthcare won the Independent Healthcare Award for Best Healthcare Outcomes and followed this in 2009 with the Nursing Practice award for their approach to infection prevention and control. In 2010, Spire won the Nursing Practice award for the second year in succession, together with the award for Excellence in Risk Management. Spire won the Innovation Award in 2011, before going on to win the Medical Practice award in 2012.

== See also ==
- Private medicine in the United Kingdom
