= 1950 Leeds City Council election =

English local election

The 1950 Leeds municipal elections were held on Thursday, 11 May 1950, with one third of the seats to be elected.

The election was sparsely contested owing to an electoral truce between Labour and the Conservatives in anticipation of the impending boundary changes to take effect the following year. However the Liberals and Communists fielded candidates in a number of wards - although the Liberals' two candidates was much reduced from recent showings, whilst conversely the Communists contesting of over a quarter of wards was well above their usual three. Eight wards in total were opposed, with the five Labour and three Conservative incumbents easily defending them, ensuring an uneventful result in contrast to the national picture.

== Election result ==
Leeds local election result 1950
Party	Seats	Gains	Losses	Net gain/loss	Seats %	Votes %	Votes	+/−
Labour	17	0	0	0	65.4	51.2	9,733	+8.4
Conservative	9	0	0	0	34.6	39.0	7,415	-13.5
Communist	0	0	0	0	0.0	5.1	980	+4.6
Liberal	0	0	0	0	0.0	4.7	892	+0.6

The result had the following consequences for the total number of seats on the council after the elections:

Party	Previous council		New council	
Party	Cllr	Ald	Cllr	Ald
Labour	42	14	42	14
Conservatives	36	12	36	12
Total	78	26	78	26
Total	104		104	
Working majority	6	2	6	2
Working majority	8		8	

== Ward results ==
Armley & Wortley
Party	Candidate	Votes	%	±%
Labour	Ms. Marlow	2,109	95.4	+31.5
Communist	L. Burwin	102	4.6	+4.6
Majority		2,007	90.8	+63.0
Turnout		2,211		
Labour hold		Swing	+13.4	

Beeston
Party	Candidate	Votes	%	±%
Conservative	F. Gummersall	Unopposed	N/A	N/A
Conservative hold		Swing	N/A	

Blenheim
Party	Candidate	Votes	%	±%
Conservative	S. Webster	2,263	93.7	+33.0
Communist	M. Roche	152	6.3	+6.3
Majority		2,111	87.4	+66.1
Turnout		2,415		
Conservative hold		Swing	+13.3	

Bramley
Party	Candidate	Votes	%	±%
Labour	Eric Atkinson	Unopposed	N/A	N/A
Labour hold		Swing	N/A	

Burmantofts
Party	Candidate	Votes	%	±%
Labour	G. Murray	Unopposed	N/A	N/A
Labour hold		Swing	N/A	

Central
Party	Candidate	Votes	%	±%
Labour	A. Lowcock	Unopposed	N/A	N/A
Labour hold		Swing	N/A	

Cross Gates & Temple Newsam
Party	Candidate	Votes	%	±%
Conservative	J. Brooksbanks	Unopposed	N/A	N/A
Conservative hold		Swing	N/A	

East Hunslet
Party	Candidate	Votes	%	±%
Labour	Lizzie Naylor	Unopposed	N/A	N/A
Labour hold		Swing	N/A	

Far Headingley
Party	Candidate	Votes	%	±%
Conservative	G. Dovenor	Unopposed	N/A	N/A
Conservative hold		Swing	N/A	

Farnley & Wortley
Party	Candidate	Votes	%	±%
Labour	K. Muir	Unopposed	N/A	N/A
Labour hold		Swing	N/A	

Harehills
Party	Candidate	Votes	%	±%
Labour	Ms. Hill	1,753	94.3	+44.8
Communist	P. Warburton	106	5.7	+5.7
Majority		1,647	88.6	+87.5
Turnout		1,859		
Labour hold		Swing	+19.5	

Holbeck North
Party	Candidate	Votes	%	±%
Labour	F. Hirst	Unopposed	N/A	N/A
Labour hold		Swing	N/A	

Holbeck South
Party	Candidate	Votes	%	±%
Labour	G. Bray	Unopposed	N/A	N/A
Labour hold		Swing	N/A	

Hunslet Carr & Middleton
Party	Candidate	Votes	%	±%
Labour	S. Hand	Unopposed	N/A	N/A
Labour hold		Swing	N/A	

Hyde Park
Party	Candidate	Votes	%	±%
Conservative	H. McKay	2,859	86.8	+16.8
Liberal	G. Foster	434	13.2	+4.0
Majority		2,425	73.6	+24.4
Turnout		3,293		
Conservative hold		Swing	+6.4	

Kirkstall
Party	Candidate	Votes	%	±%
Labour	A. Happold	2,572	94.1	+50.6
Communist	R. Huffingley	160	5.9	+3.5
Majority		2,412	88.3	+86.6
Turnout		2,732		
Labour hold		Swing	+23.5	

Mill Hill & South
Party	Candidate	Votes	%	±%
Conservative	T. Nipe	Unopposed	N/A	N/A
Conservative hold		Swing	N/A	

North
Party	Candidate	Votes	%	±%
Conservative	John Watson	Unopposed	N/A	N/A
Conservative hold		Swing	N/A	

Osmondthorpe
Party	Candidate	Votes	%	±%
Labour	F. Potter	Unopposed	N/A	N/A
Labour hold		Swing	N/A	

Potternewton
Party	Candidate	Votes	%	±%
Conservative	J. Mulley	2,293	88.5	+25.3
Communist	B. Ramelson	297	11.5	+4.4
Majority		1,996	77.1	+43.5
Turnout		2,590		
Conservative hold		Swing	+10.4	

Richmond Hill
Party	Candidate	Votes	%	±%
Labour	Z. Fernandez	Unopposed	N/A	N/A
Labour hold		Swing	N/A	

Roundhay
Party	Candidate	Votes	%	±%
Conservative	H. Drake	Unopposed	N/A	N/A
Conservative hold		Swing	N/A	

Upper Armley
Party	Candidate	Votes	%	±%
Labour	J. Hodgson	Unopposed	N/A	N/A
Labour hold		Swing	N/A	

West Hunslet
Party	Candidate	Votes	%	±%
Labour	T. Ellison	1,833	77.2	+23.7
Liberal	Victor Louis Raymond Delepine	458	19.3	+8.2
Communist	J. Roche	84	3.5	−1.0
Majority		1,375	57.9	+35.3
Turnout		2,375		
Labour hold		Swing	+7.7	

Westfield
Party	Candidate	Votes	%	±%
Labour	John Rafferty	Unopposed	N/A	N/A
Labour hold		Swing	N/A	

Woodhouse
Party	Candidate	Votes	%	±%
Labour	Henry Vick	1,466	94.9	+43.4
Communist	B. Kline	79	5.1	+5.1
Majority		1,387	89.8	+86.9
Turnout		1,545		
Labour hold		Swing	+19.1	
