= 1962 Leeds City Council election =

Municipal election in Leeds

The 1962 Leeds municipal elections were held on Thursday 10 May 1962, with one third of the council to be elected.

Both Labour and Conservative took hits to their vote (although falling more at the Conservative's expense meant a 1.7% swing to Labour) as the Liberals received record support, more than doubling contemporary results to surpass the 10,000 marker in votes and obtaining a double-figure vote share for the first time. Unable to add to the gains they were making across England and Wales that night, they won second-place in the majority of the ten wards they fought - although most looked unlikely to pay much dividend, simply pipping Labour to distant second-place in safe-Conservative seats. The closest races - offering some prospect of success for them - were found in Far Headingley where they managed a swing of just under 11% to wipe away two-thirds of the Tory majority, and achieving an even larger swing of 14% to turn Stanningley into a Labour-held three-way marginal.

The Liberals weren't alone in fielding their greatest number of candidates, as the Communists matched their 1950 record of seven candidates, surpassing one percent for the first time (beyond 1950). Despite these advances, the only change was to be found in the Conservative-Labour battleground of Wortley, with Labour gaining the seat by a mere three votes. Turnout fell modestly to 33.9% on the previous year.

== Election result ==
Leeds local election result 1962
Party	Seats	Gains	Losses	Net gain/loss	Seats %	Votes %	Votes	+/−
Labour	18	1	0	+1	64.3	43.9	51,574	-1.4
Conservative	10	0	1	-1	35.7	43.7	51,392	-4.8
Liberal	0	0	0	0	0.0	11.3	13,237	+6.2
Communist	0	0	0	0	0.0	1.1	1,256	+0.2

The result had the following consequences for the total number of seats on the council after the elections:

Party	Previous council		New council	
Party	Cllr	Ald	Cllr	Ald
Labour	47	16	48	16
Conservatives	37	12	36	12
Total	84	28	84	28
Total	112		112	
Working majority	10	4	12	4
Working majority	14		16	

== Ward results ==
Allerton
Party	Candidate	Votes	%	±%
Conservative	F. Marshall	3,702	63.8	−8.3
Liberal	Julius Blum	1,246	21.5	+7.5
Labour	A. Baum	856	14.7	+0.8
Majority		2,456	42.3	−15.8
Turnout		5,804		
Conservative hold		Swing	-7.9	

Armley
Party	Candidate	Votes	%	±%
Labour	J. Bissell	2,330	60.3	+6.9
Conservative	R. Beal	1,537	39.7	−3.0
Majority		793	20.5	+9.9
Turnout		3,867		
Labour hold		Swing	+4.9	

Beeston
Party	Candidate	Votes	%	±%
Conservative	A. Hartley	3,162	51.2	−2.1
Labour	J. Prichard	3,017	48.8	+2.1
Majority		145	2.3	−4.3
Turnout		6,179		
Conservative hold		Swing	-2.1	

Blenheim
Party	Candidate	Votes	%	±%
Labour	W. Merritt	1,613	71.2	+11.0
Conservative	J. Cumberland	651	28.8	−11.0
Majority		962	42.5	+22.1
Turnout		2,264		
Labour hold		Swing	+11.0	

Bramley
Party	Candidate	Votes	%	±%
Labour	W. Lord	2,801	53.7	+1.0
Conservative	H. Pickering	2,418	46.3	−1.0
Majority		383	7.3	+2.0
Turnout		5,219		
Labour hold		Swing	+1.0	

Burmantofts
Party	Candidate	Votes	%	±%
Labour	G. Murray	2,069	74.1	+1.0
Conservative	M. Bauchop	725	25.9	−1.0
Majority		1,344	48.1	+2.0
Turnout		2,794		
Labour hold		Swing	+1.0	

City
Party	Candidate	Votes	%	±%
Labour	Bernard Atha	1,280	71.5	+9.9
Conservative	D. Mowbray	511	28.5	−9.9
Majority		769	42.9	+19.8
Turnout		1,791		
Labour hold		Swing	+9.9	

Cross Gates
Party	Candidate	Votes	%	±%
Labour	E. Coward	3,037	59.6	+1.2
Conservative	F. West	1,763	34.6	−1.4
Communist	B. Wilson	295	5.8	+0.3
Majority		1,274	25.0	+2.6
Turnout		5,095		
Labour hold		Swing	+1.3	

East Hunslet
Party	Candidate	Votes	%	±%
Labour	E. Kavanagh	1,712	63.1	−10.5
Conservative	J. Birch	548	20.2	−6.1
Liberal	E. Pemberton	452	16.7	+16.7
Majority		1,164	42.9	−4.4
Turnout		2,712		
Labour hold		Swing	-2.2	

Far Headingley
Party	Candidate	Votes	%	±%
Conservative	G. Dovenor	3,937	47.6	−10.7
Liberal	John Humphrey Morrish	3,166	38.2	+10.9
Labour	J. Moynihan	1,175	14.2	−0.2
Majority		771	9.3	−21.6
Turnout		8,278		
Conservative hold		Swing	-10.8	

Halton
Party	Candidate	Votes	%	±%
Conservative	J. Shires	3,883	63.3	−2.4
Labour	A. Kirk	1,151	18.8	+0.7
Liberal	E. Vasey	1,098	17.9	+1.7
Majority		2,785	44.6	−3.0
Turnout		6,132		
Conservative hold		Swing	-1.5	

Harehills
Party	Candidate	Votes	%	±%
Conservative	Patrick Crotty	2,615	61.2	−0.1
Labour	G. Bloom	1,660	38.8	+0.1
Majority		955	22.3	−0.3
Turnout		4,275		
Conservative hold		Swing	-0.1	

Holbeck
Party	Candidate	Votes	%	±%
Labour	G. Bray	1,754	68.4	+11.1
Conservative	J. Robinson	810	31.6	+4.0
Majority		944	36.8	+7.0
Turnout		2,564		
Labour hold		Swing	+3.5	

Hunslet Carr
Party	Candidate	Votes	%	±%
Labour	W. Parker	1,810	65.9	−1.2
Conservative	R. Austwick	729	26.5	+4.7
Communist	L. Hunter	209	7.6	+7.6
Majority		1,081	39.3	−6.0
Turnout		2,748		
Labour hold		Swing	-2.9	

Hyde Park
Party	Candidate	Votes	%	±%
Conservative	R. Fielding	2,038	61.2	−2.4
Labour	L. Steele	1,293	38.8	+2.4
Majority		745	22.4	−4.8
Turnout		3,331		
Conservative hold		Swing	-2.4	

Kirkstall
Party	Candidate	Votes	%	±%
Labour	D. Matthews	2,808	52.1	−2.3
Conservative	F. Lucas	1,581	29.4	−16.2
Liberal	D. Whittaker	996	18.5	+18.5
Majority		1,227	22.8	+14.0
Turnout		5,385		
Labour hold		Swing	+6.9	

Meanwood
Party	Candidate	Votes	%	±%
Conservative	T. Kirkby	2,733	53.9	−22.2
Liberal	Graham Rowlands	1,315	25.9	+25.9
Labour	J. Taylor	1,023	20.2	−3.7
Majority		1,418	28.0	−24.2
Turnout		5,071		
Conservative hold		Swing	-24.0	

Middleton
Party	Candidate	Votes	%	±%
Labour	S. Binns	2,251	76.5	+3.2
Conservative	D. Lodge	535	18.2	−2.7
Communist	R. Wilkinson	157	5.3	−0.5
Majority		1,716	58.3	+5.9
Turnout		2,943		
Labour hold		Swing	+2.9	

Moortown
Party	Candidate	Votes	%	±%
Conservative	L. Henson	3,703	62.5	−13.1
Liberal	G. Statman	1,170	19.8	+19.8
Labour	K. Lloyd	1,050	17.7	−6.7
Majority		2,533	42.8	−8.4
Turnout		5,923		
Conservative hold		Swing	-16.4	

Osmondthorpe
Party	Candidate	Votes	%	±%
Labour	L. Walsh	2,384	74.8	+1.5
Conservative	A. Bell	802	25.2	−1.5
Majority		1,582	49.7	+3.0
Turnout		3,186		
Labour hold		Swing	+1.5	

Potternewton
Party	Candidate	Votes	%	±%
Conservative	L. Lyons	1,785	52.5	−6.0
Labour	Kevin Gould	859	25.3	+0.2
Liberal	T. Longhorn	652	19.2	+6.1
Communist	H. Fawcett	103	3.0	−0.4
Majority		926	27.2	−6.2
Turnout		3,399		
Conservative hold		Swing	-3.1	

Richmond Hill
Party	Candidate	Votes	%	±%
Labour	W. Cain	1,897	77.3	+1.1
Conservative	A. Booth	424	17.3	−2.2
Communist	E. Burwin	132	5.4	+1.2
Majority		1,473	60.0	+3.3
Turnout		2,453		
Labour hold		Swing	+1.6	

Roundhay
Party	Candidate	Votes	%	±%
Conservative	S. Codd	2,949	57.0	−18.6
Liberal	A. Clarke	1,355	26.2	+26.2
Labour	D. Thomas	869	16.8	−7.6
Majority		1,594	30.8	−20.4
Turnout		5,173		
Conservative hold		Swing	-22.4	

Stanningley
Party	Candidate	Votes	%	±%
Labour	Jim Marshall	2,079	38.5	−10.3
Liberal	Dennis Pedder	1,787	33.1	+17.7
Conservative	A. Rakuson	1,540	28.5	−7.4
Majority		292	5.4	−7.5
Turnout		5,406		
Labour hold		Swing	-14.0	

Wellington
Party	Candidate	Votes	%	±%
Labour	J. Underwood	2,018	75.8	+1.2
Conservative	A. Stephen	440	16.5	−2.4
Communist	G. Hodgson	206	7.7	+1.2
Majority		1,578	59.2	+3.6
Turnout		2,664		
Labour hold		Swing	+1.8	

Westfield
Party	Candidate	Votes	%	±%
Labour	Stan Cohen	1,824	57.2	+8.2
Conservative	A. Sexton	1,364	42.8	+6.6
Majority		460	14.4	+1.6
Turnout		3,188		
Labour hold		Swing	+0.8	

Woodhouse
Party	Candidate	Votes	%	±%
Labour	H. Bretherick	2,064	53.8	+2.3
Conservative	P. Greene	1,620	42.2	−2.7
Communist	E. Meth	154	4.0	+0.5
Majority		444	11.6	+5.0
Turnout		3,838		
Labour hold		Swing	+2.5	

Wortley
Party	Candidate	Votes	%	±%
Labour	J. Stephenson	2,890	50.0	+2.4
Conservative	F. Stubley	2,887	50.0	−2.4
Majority		3	0.1	−4.7
Turnout		5,777		
Labour gain from Conservative		Swing	+2.4	
