= Joyce Gould, Baroness Gould of Potternewton =

British trade unionist and peer

The Right Honourable The Baroness Gould of Potternewton FRCOG

Member of the House of Lords
- Lord Temporal
- Life peerage 6 October 1993 – 22 July 2019

Personal details
- Born: 29 October 1932 (age 93) Leeds, West Yorkshire, England
- Spouse: Kevin Gould (m. 1952)
- Children: 1
- Education: Roundhay High School for Girls; Bradford Technical College
- Occupation: Politician

Joyce Brenda Gould, Baroness Gould of Potternewton FRCOG (born 29 October 1932) is a British Labour Party politician.

== Early life ==
The daughter of Sydney Manson and his wife Fanny (née Taylor), she was educated at the Roundhay High School for Girls and the Bradford Technical College in pharmacy.

== Career ==
Gould worked as pharmaceutical dispenser from 1952 until 1965, when she was then employed as a clerical worker whilst assisting to organise the Pioneer Women (1965–1966).

== Political career ==
Gould was assistant regional organiser for the Labour Party from 1969 to 1975, assistant the national agent and chief women's officer from 1975 to 1985, and then director of organisation from 1985 to 1993.

Gould was a committee member of the Campaign Against Racial Discrimination from 1965 to 1975, and member of the management committee of the Grand Theatre in Leeds from 1968 to 1972. Gould was executive member of the Joint Committee Against Racism in 1970, secretary of the Yorkshire National Council for Civil Liberties between 1970 and 1975, and Secretary of the National Joint Committee of Working Women's Organisations from 1975 to 1985.

Between 1970 and 1975, she was executive member of the Women's National Commission and of the Commission on Conduct of Referendums between 1990 and 1994. In 1971, she was a member of the Department of Employment Women's Advisory Committee, and from 1997 to 1998 she was a member of the Independent Commission on Electoral Systems. She held the position as Vice President Socialist International Women (1978–85), and was also a member of the Home Office Committee on Electoral Matters.

She is a member of the Transport and General Workers' Union (TGWU) and General Municipal Boilermakers and Allied Trades Union (GMB).

=== House of Lords ===
On 6 October 1993, she was created a life peer with the title Baroness Gould of Potternewton, of Leeds in the County of West Yorkshire. She was Opposition Whip (1994–97), whilst also holding positions for the Citizen's Charter (1994–96) and Women (1996–97). She has held positions on various House of Lords Select Committees: Finance and Staffing (1994–97); European Union Sub-committee C - Environmental Affairs (1994–97); Constitution (2001–05); Speakership of the House (2003); Refreshment (2005–2008) (2012-); Procedure (2008–2009) (2012–2014); Enquiries (2013–2014); Affordable Childcare (2014-); Standing Orders (Private Bills) Committee (2008-). She was Deputy Chair (2002–2012) and Deputy Speaker (2002–2012). She retired from the House of Lords on 22 July 2019.

== Other activities ==
She has been a member and secretary of several anti-racist, women's and civil liberties bodies since 1965. She is a member of the Fawcett Society, a past council member of the Constitution Unit and vice chair and executive member of the Hansard Society. She is president of the Family Planning Association as well as chair of the H Chapman Society. She has been a Patron of Yorkshire MESMAC since 2008 and of: UN Women UK, HIV Sport, the Brighton Women's Centre; Forward (Foundation for Women's Health Research & Development) and Jo's Trust. She has also been the Vice President of Speakability since 2000 and the President of the Brighton and Hove Fabian Society since 2008.

Gould is President of the Mary MacArthur Holiday Trust. She also has two Fellowships of the Industry and Parliament Trust.

She is past Chair of the Independent Advisory Group on Sexual Health and HIV from 2003 to 2011.

In 2007, she was appointed to the Board of the Women's National Commission, shortly after that she was made interim Chair . In March 2008, she was appointed as Permanent Chair. She is a past president of the UK charity Epilepsy Action.

== Honours and qualifications ==
In 1997, she received an Honorary Degree from the University of Bradford and in 2006, she was made an Honorary Fellow of the Faculty of Sexual and Reproductive Healthcare of the Royal College of Obstetricians & Gynaecologists. In 2007 she was made an Hon. Fellow British Association for Sexual Health and HIV. In 2009 she received an Hon. Doctorate from Birmingham City University and in 2012 she received an Hon. Degree from Greenwich University.

== Personal life ==
In 1952, she married Kevin Gould. They have a daughter.

Party political offices
Preceded by Betty Lockwood	National Women's Officer of the Labour Party; 1975–1988	Succeeded by Vicky Phillips
