= Brunjes =

Brunjes is a surname. Notable people with the surname include:

- Emma Brunjes, British theatre producer, talent manager, and ticket agent
- George Brunjes (1889–1968), American politician
- Harry Brünjes (born 1954), British physician and businessman
- Peter Brunjes (born 1963), American neurobiologist who studied brain development

== See also ==
- Brunies
