= Scott Brothers =

Scott Brothers may refer to:

- The Scott Brothers, Canadian television personalities, see Property Brothers (franchise)
- The Singing Scott Brothers, a close harmony variety act in the UK, also variously called Scott Brothers or Scott Bros.
- Scott Brothers (manufacturers), Christchurch, New Zealand
