= The Singing Scott Brothers =

The Singing Scott Brothers (Scott Brothers / Scott Bros.)
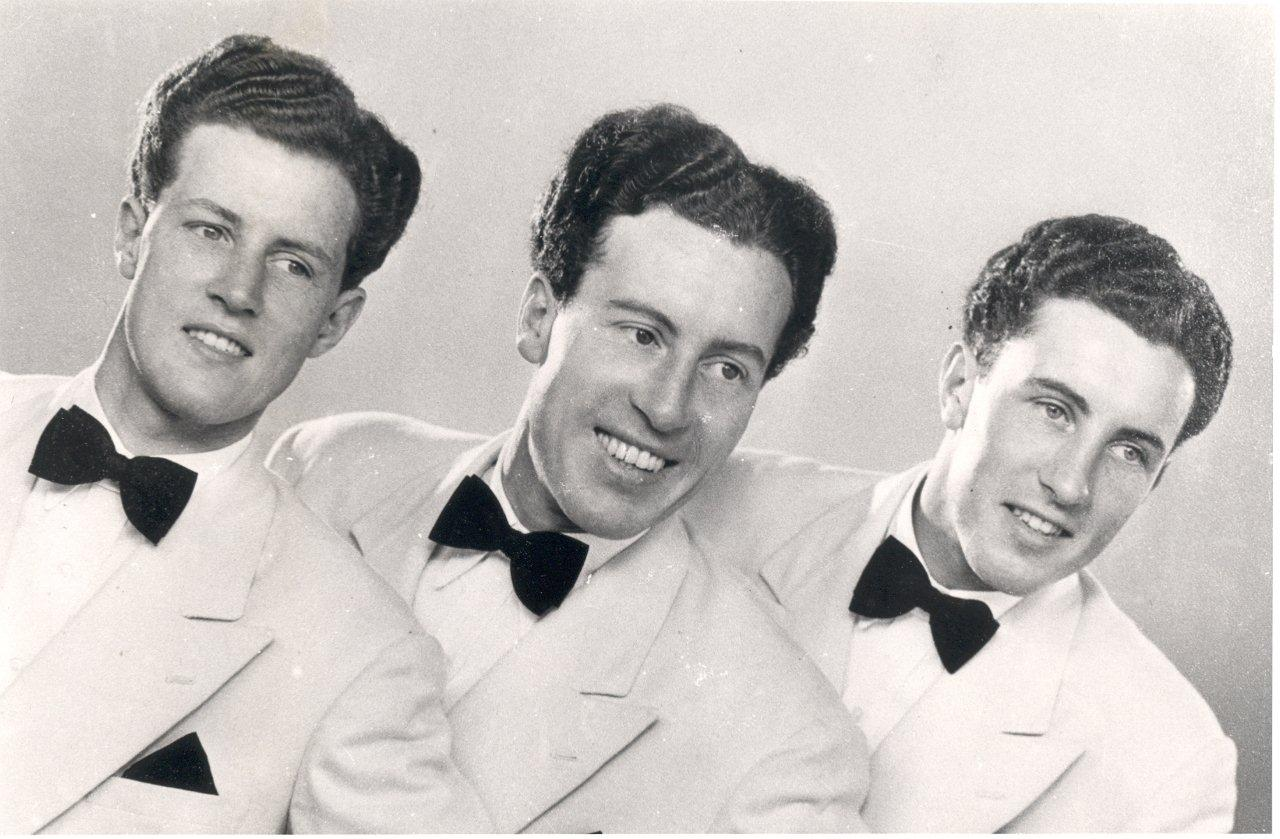
- The Singing Scott Brothers in 1950. Drew, Harry and Tom.

Background information
- Origin: United Kingdom (Scotland and England)
- Genres: Doo-wop
- Years active: 1940s and 1950s
- Members: Harry Brünjes; Drew Brünjes; Tom Brünjes

The Singing Scott Brothers or at times just Scott Brothers or Scotts Bros. were a close harmony variety act in the UK, particularly active between 1949 and 1955. They were real brothers from Glasgow and the family name was Brünjes. Harry was born in 1924, Drew in 1926 and Tom in 1928.

Initially their career was in Scotland in summer shows, pantomimes and variety weeks. Subsequently, they moved south of the border with seasons at Bridlington, Scarborough, Great Yarmouth, Bournemouth and Blackpool.

The peak of their career was the Royal Variety Show in 1953 at the London Coliseum. It is only recently that old recordings have come to light including several of their radio shows. These recordings were of poor quality but have been digitally remastered for a compilation album. For the early recordings in Glasgow their father Harry Brünjes accompanied the three brothers on piano.

At the time of the CD release in 2009, Harry was 85 and lived on the Isle of Wight. Drew was 83 and was based in Glasgow and Tom was 81 and had been in Los Angeles for over fifty years. After show business, Harry became a headmaster, Drew a chemistry lecturer and Tom an electronics engineer. There were two more brothers, Eric (born 1933) and Jack (born 1937) and also two sisters Marie (born 1935) and Margaret (born 1940). Harry's son, Dr Harry Brünjes, is a physician, founder of the Premier Medical Group and chairman of English National Opera (ENO). His granddaughter is West End theatre producer Emma Brunjes.

== Discography ==
(selective)

- "Beggin' For Your Love"
- "Do You Want My Love?"
- "Gotta Get Away from You"
- "Life"
- "Lost Love"
- "Love Me Tenderly"
- "Memories"
- "Part of You"
