= Bruniges =

Bruniges is a surname. Notable people with the surname include:

- Michele Bruniges (born 1957), Australian teacher and education administrator
- Rob Bruniges (born 1956), British fencer and coach

== See also ==
- Brunies
