= 2-4-0 =

Locomotive wheel arrangement

2-4-0 (Porter)
- Front of locomotive at left

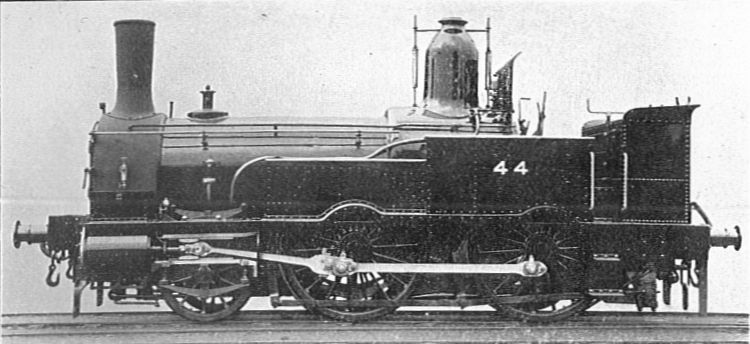
- LSWR 0298 Class or Beattie Well Tank
Equivalent classifications
- UIC class: 1B, 1'B
- French class: 120
- Turkish class: 23
- Swiss class: 2/3
- Russian class: 1-2-0
First known tender engine version
- First use: c. 1830s-1840s
- Country: United Kingdom
- Evolved from: 2-2-0, 2-2-2, 4-2-0
- Benefits: Better adhesion with coupled wheels

Under the Whyte notation for the classification of steam locomotives, 2-4-0 represents the wheel arrangement of two leading wheels on one axle, four powered and coupled driving wheels on two axles and no trailing wheels. In most of North America it became known as a Porter.

The notation 2-4-0T indicates a tank locomotive of this wheel arrangement, on which its water and fuel is carried on board the engine itself, rather than in an attached tender. A subset is 2-4-0WT, a configuration in which the water is under the bolier in a well tank.

== Overview ==
The 2-4-0 configuration was developed in the United Kingdom in the late 1830s or early 1840s as an enlargement of the 2-2-0 and 2-2-2 types, with the additional pair of coupled wheels giving better adhesion. The type was initially designed for freight haulage. One of the earliest examples was the broad-gauge GWR Leo Class, designed by Daniel Gooch and built during 1841 and 1842 by R. & W. Hawthorn, Leslie and Company; Fenton, Murray and Jackson; and Rothwell, Hick and Rothwell. Because of its popularity for a period with English railways, noted railway author C. Hamilton Ellis considered the 2-4-0 designation to have the nickname (under the Whyte notation) of Old English.

During 1846–47, Alexander Allan of the newly established London and North Western Railway (LNWR) created the Crewe type of locomotive, with a 2-2-2 wheel arrangement for passenger classes and 2-4-0 for freight. During the 1850s and 1860s, these designs were widely copied by other railways, both in the United Kingdom and overseas.

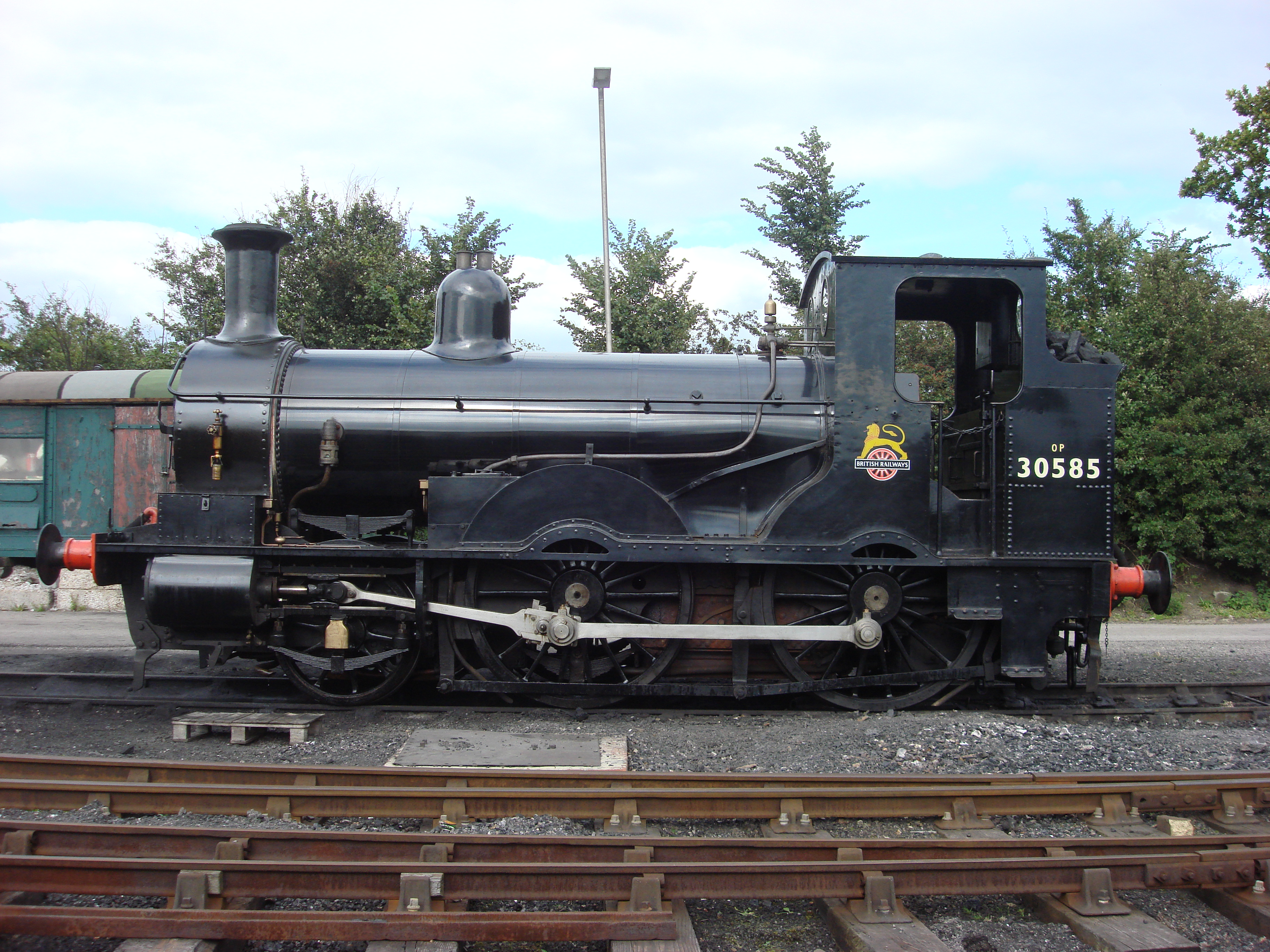
Beattie's 0298 Class Well tank locomotive

During the mid-1840s, John Hawkshaw developed a new style of 2-4-0 passenger locomotive with outside cylinders in front of the leading wheels and the rear driving axle behind the firebox. This layout provided steady running at high speeds, despite a long overhang at the front.

Joseph Beattie of the London and South Western Railway was one of the first British locomotive engineers to use this type on express locomotives. From 1858, he began experimenting with 2-4-0 designs for passenger work, culminating in his Seven-Foot 2-4-0 express passenger locomotives, built between 1859 and 1868. Beattie was also responsible for the long-lived 0298 Class of 2-4-0 well tanks, designed for suburban passenger work in 1874, some examples of which were still working in 1961. A locomotive of this type hauled the first Orient Express from Paris to Munich, a notable achievement for such a small engine.

After 1854, the Hawkshaw type of 2-4-0 was adopted by Beyer, Peacock and Company, who built many examples of the type for export, including to the Swedish State Railways in 1856 and the Zealand Railway in Denmark in 1870.

== Usage ==
=== Australia ===
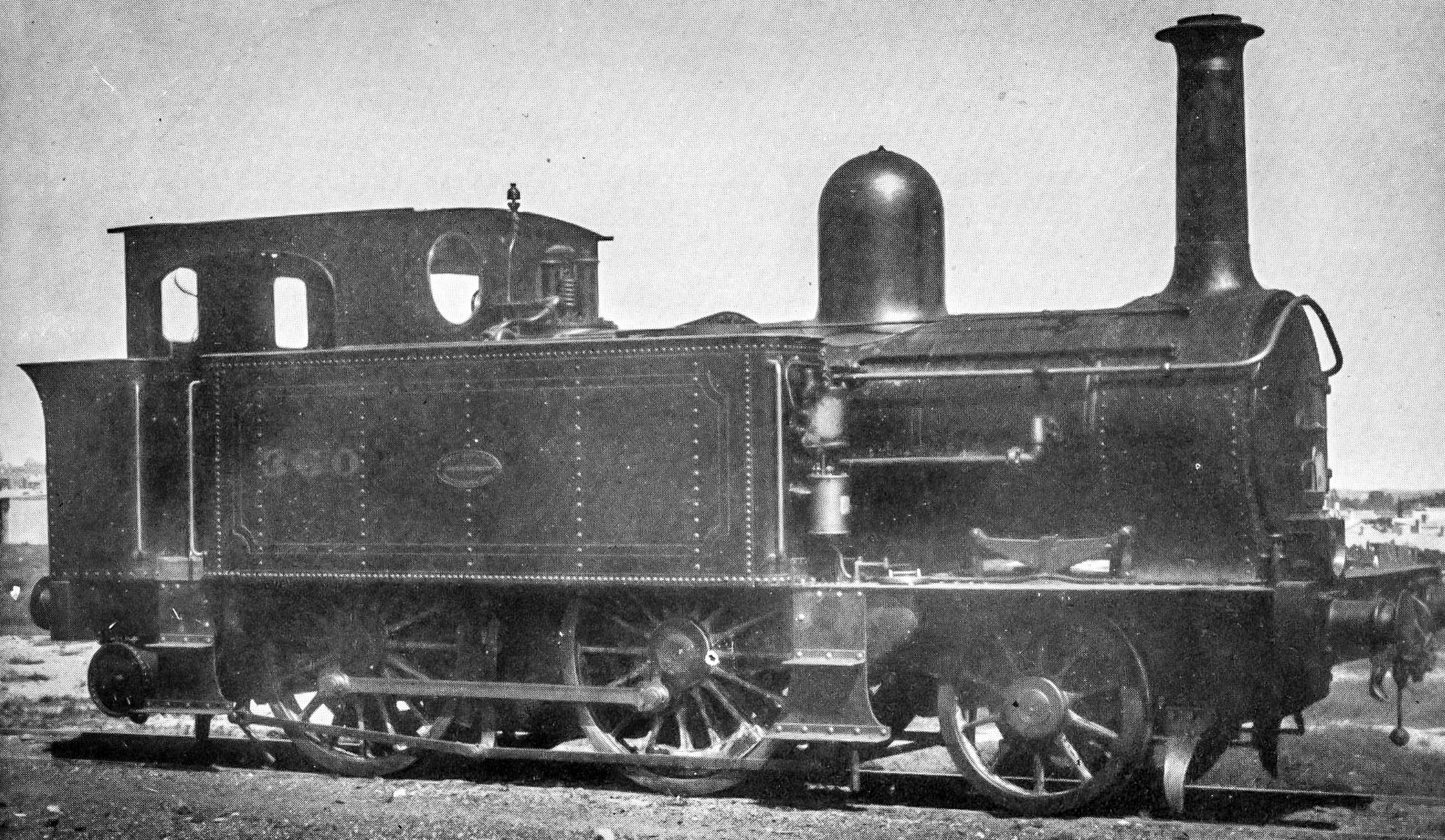
NSWGR F351 class locomotive

The New South Wales Government Railways F351 class 2-4-0 tank locomotives (later reclassified as a part of the X10 class) were intended to haul suburban passenger trains in Sydney, and delivered in 1885 - 1887. After a derailment incident—in which nine died and 22 were injured—from 1901, the entire class was withdrawn from passenger work. These locomotives were then allocated to shunting, yard and depot duties. Ten of the class were sold to various private railway operators, including for industrial use. Two are preserved.

South Australian Railways used P class 2-4-0 tank locomotives to haul suburban passenger services in Adelaide, from 1884 to 1929. One locomotive is preserved.

=== France ===
There were several French locomotives that used this wheel arrangement, such as the Ouest No. 721, which hauled the 1895 Paris-Montparnasse express. There were also other mixed-traffic Ouest locomotives which dated back to the mid-19th century.

=== Germany ===
The Bavarian B V and Bavarian B VI 2-4-0 locomotives of the Royal Bavarian State Railways were the first types to be produced in Bavaria in large numbers. In all, 208 were built between 1853 and 1863. One example is preserved in the Nuremberg Transport Museum.

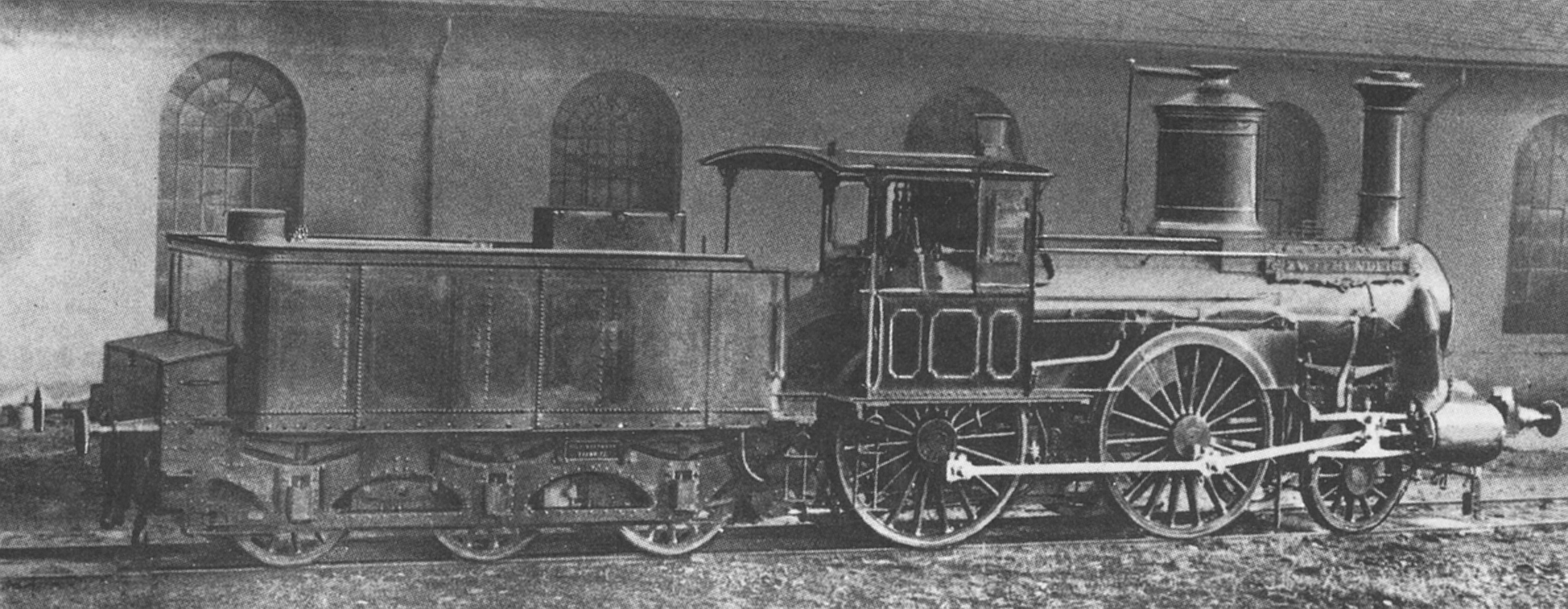
Mecklenburg III class No. 19 ZWEIHUNDERT

Between 1864 and 1869, the Grand Duchy of Mecklenburg Friedrich-Franz Railway bought 19 Hawkshaw type Mecklenburg III 2-4-0 locomotives from Richard Hartmann in Chemnitz.

Between 1877 and 1885, altogether 294 passenger locomotives of the Prussian P 2 class were delivered to the Prussian state railways and its forebears.

=== Indonesia ===
The Indonesian Railways Class B50, formerly the Dutch Indies Railways Class 200, were the only tender types to be used for pulling passenger trains from Madiun to Ponorogo. In all, 60 were built by Sharp, Stewart and Company. Until today, only 1 survived, which is B5004, while the tender was attached into B2301.

=== New Zealand ===
In New Zealand, two classes of tank locomotive were built with the 2-4-0T wheel arrangement. They were the New Zealand Railways (NZR) D class in 1874 and 1929, and the NZR L class in 1878, both classes having been designed for mixed traffic use.

Five D class locomotives were built by Dübs and Company in Glasgow, Scotland, nineteen were built by Neilson and Company and eleven were built by Scott Brothers of Christchurch. The first members of the D class entered service in 1874 and all had been withdrawn from NZR service by the end of 1927, which allowed the D classification to be used again in 1929.

Of the 33 D class locomotives built, seven have been preserved, although only D16 and D140 were in operational condition.

All ten L class locomotives were built by the Avonside Engine Company in Bristol. The first L class built entered service in 1878 and another nine L class locomotives were ordered. In 1893–94, three of the L class 2-4-0T locomotives were rebuilt to a 4-4-0 wheel arrangement at Newmarket workshops, with larger boilers and enlarged cylinders. This new design was classified La, but their limited coal bunker capacity remained a drawback. The solution was to add a trailing pony truck to accommodate a larger coal bunker, converting them to a 4-4-2T wheel arrangement. A further four L class locomotives were similarly converted. Three were not rebuilt, but sold to the Public Works Department between 1901 and 1903. Three new 4-4-2T locomotives were built in 1902–03. When the conversion program was completed in 1903, the classification for all ten remaining NZR locomotives was changed back to L.

Of the ten L class locomotives built, numbers 207 (507), 208 (508) and 219 (509) survived long enough to be preserved, all three operational.

=== South Africa ===
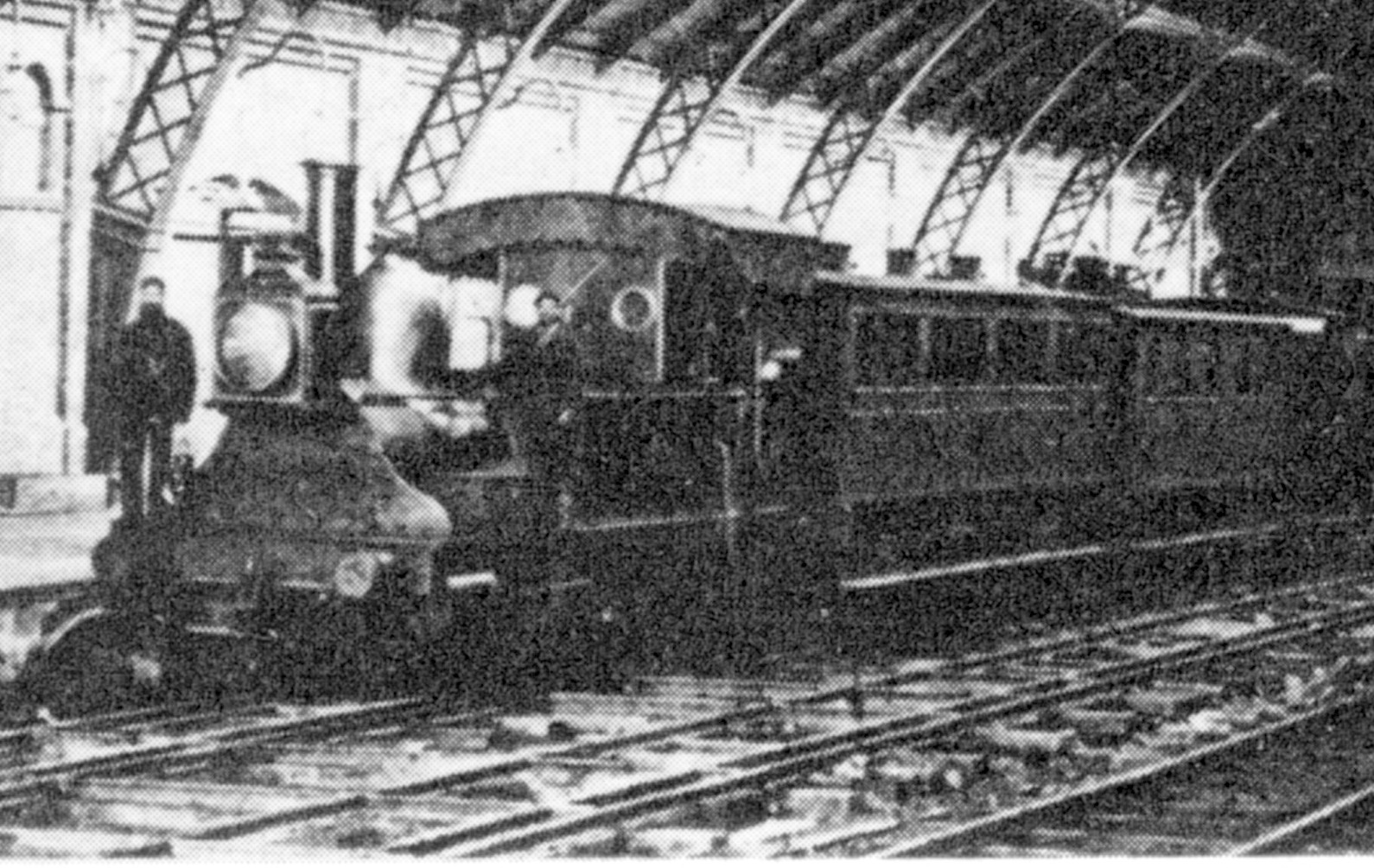
2-4-0T Ebden in Cape Town, c. 1872

A standard gauge railway line between Salt River and Wynberg in the Cape of Good Hope, constructed with private capital, was opened to the public on 19 December 1864. The Cape Town Railway and Dock Company undertook to rent and operate the line and acquired three 2-4-0 tank locomotives as motive power for the line in 1864.

In 1872, the locomotives came onto the roster of the Cape Government Railways when it took over the operation of all railways in the Cape of Good Hope. They remained in service on this line until after its conversion to dual standard-and-Cape gauges around 1872 and were retired in 1881, when sufficient Cape gauge locomotives were in service.

=== United Kingdom ===
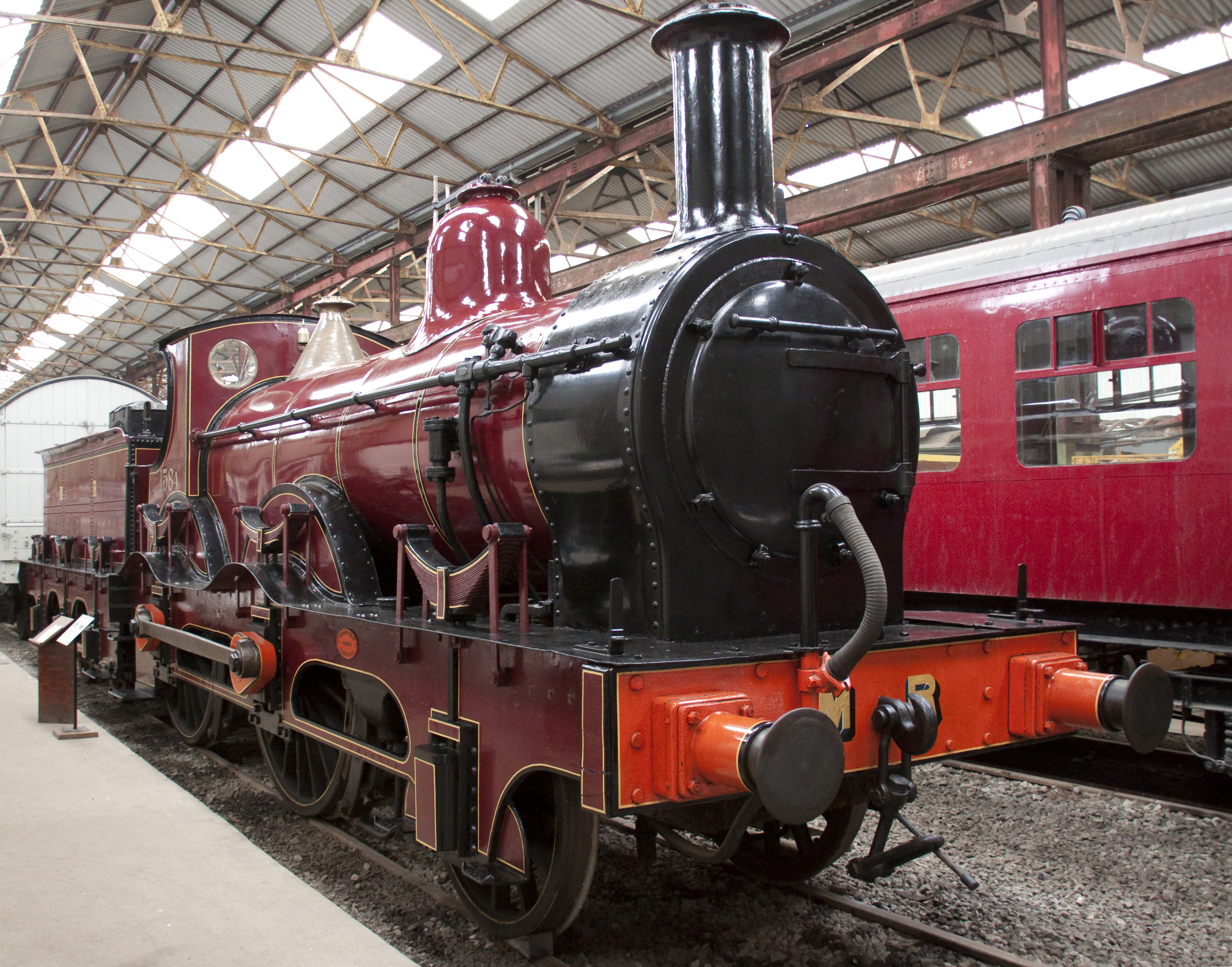
Midland Railway 158A of 1866

Before 1846, the type was used on the Liverpool and Manchester, Birmingham and Gloucester, North Midland and London and South Western Railways.

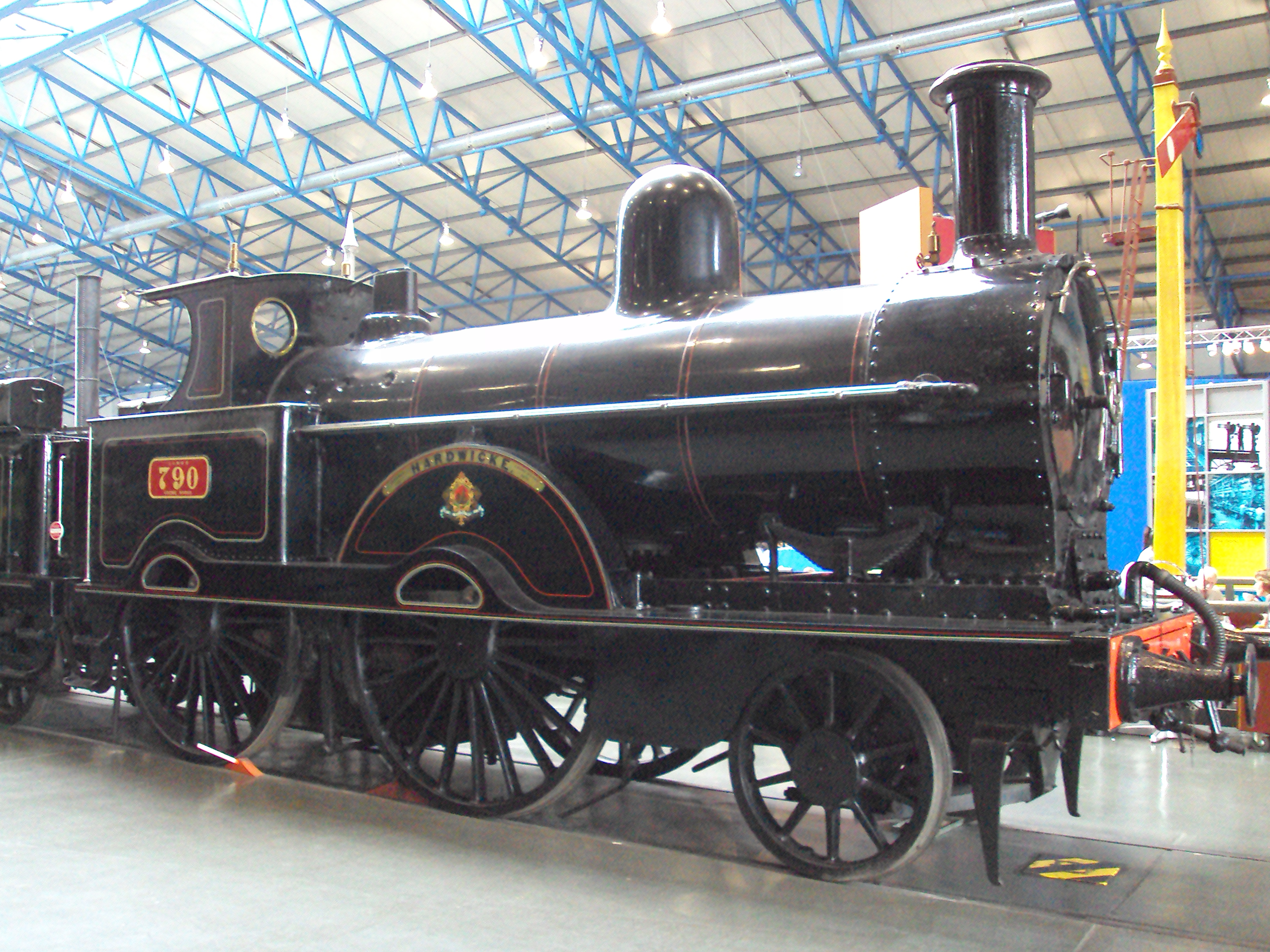
LNWR's Improved Precedent class Hardwicke at York Railway Museum

Between 1846 and 1880, the 2-4-0 was the standard type for passenger and mixed-traffic locomotives and was built in large numbers by, amongst others, the LNWR (1846–96), the Midland Railway (1846–1880), the Great Northern Railway (1849–97), the North Eastern Railway (1856–88) and the Great Eastern Railway (1856–1902).

Most United Kingdom railways used 2-4-0s, including those designed by James Holden on the Great Eastern Railway, Matthew Kirtley on the Midland Railway, Joseph Armstrong on the Great Western Railway and Francis Webb on the London and North Western Railway. One of the latter's types, the Improved Precedent Class Hardwicke famously set outstanding records for the LNWR during the Race to the North in 1895.

=== United States ===
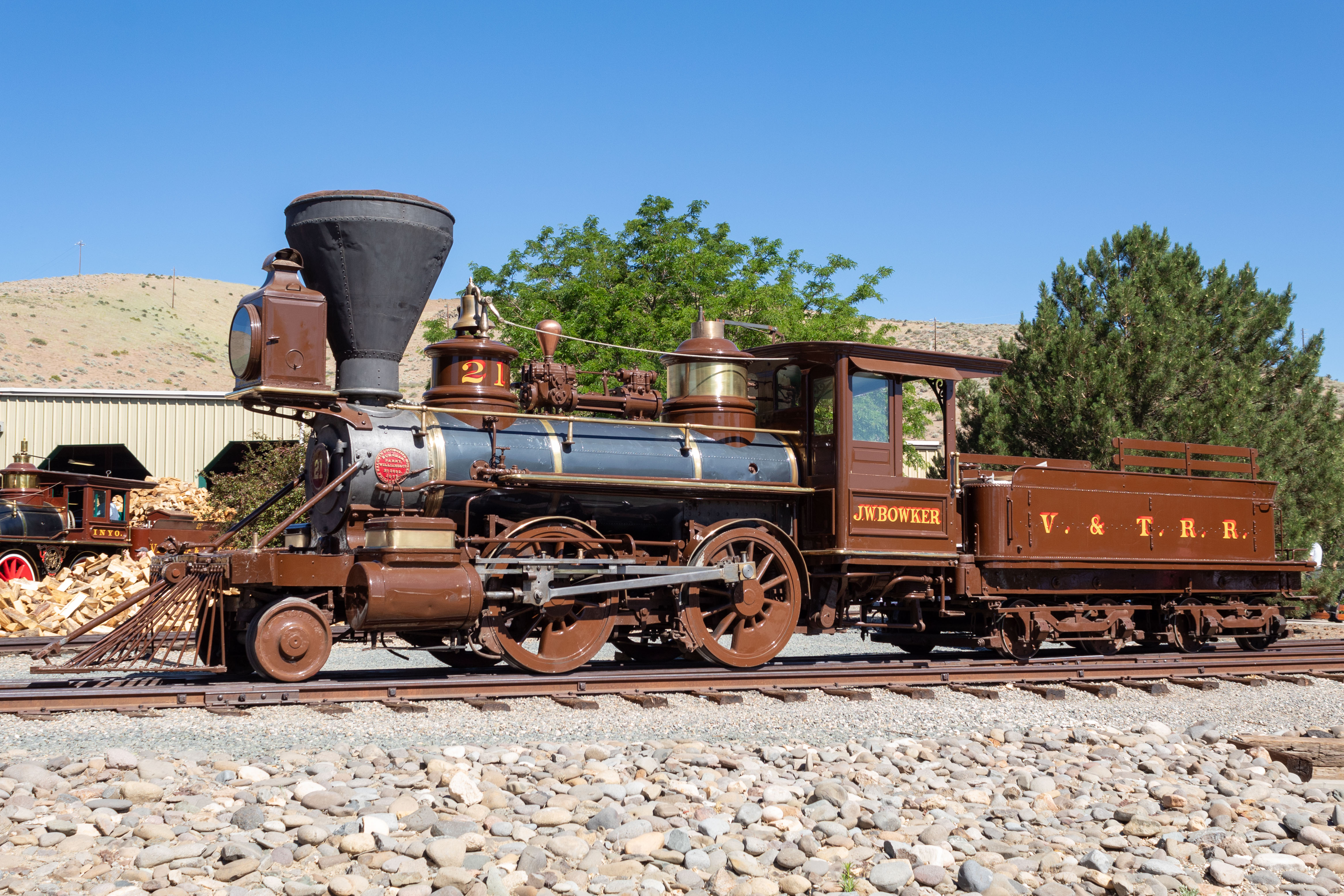
Virginia and Truckee 21 J.W. Bowker, the last remaining Baldwin 2-4-0 from the Virginia and Truckee Railroad.

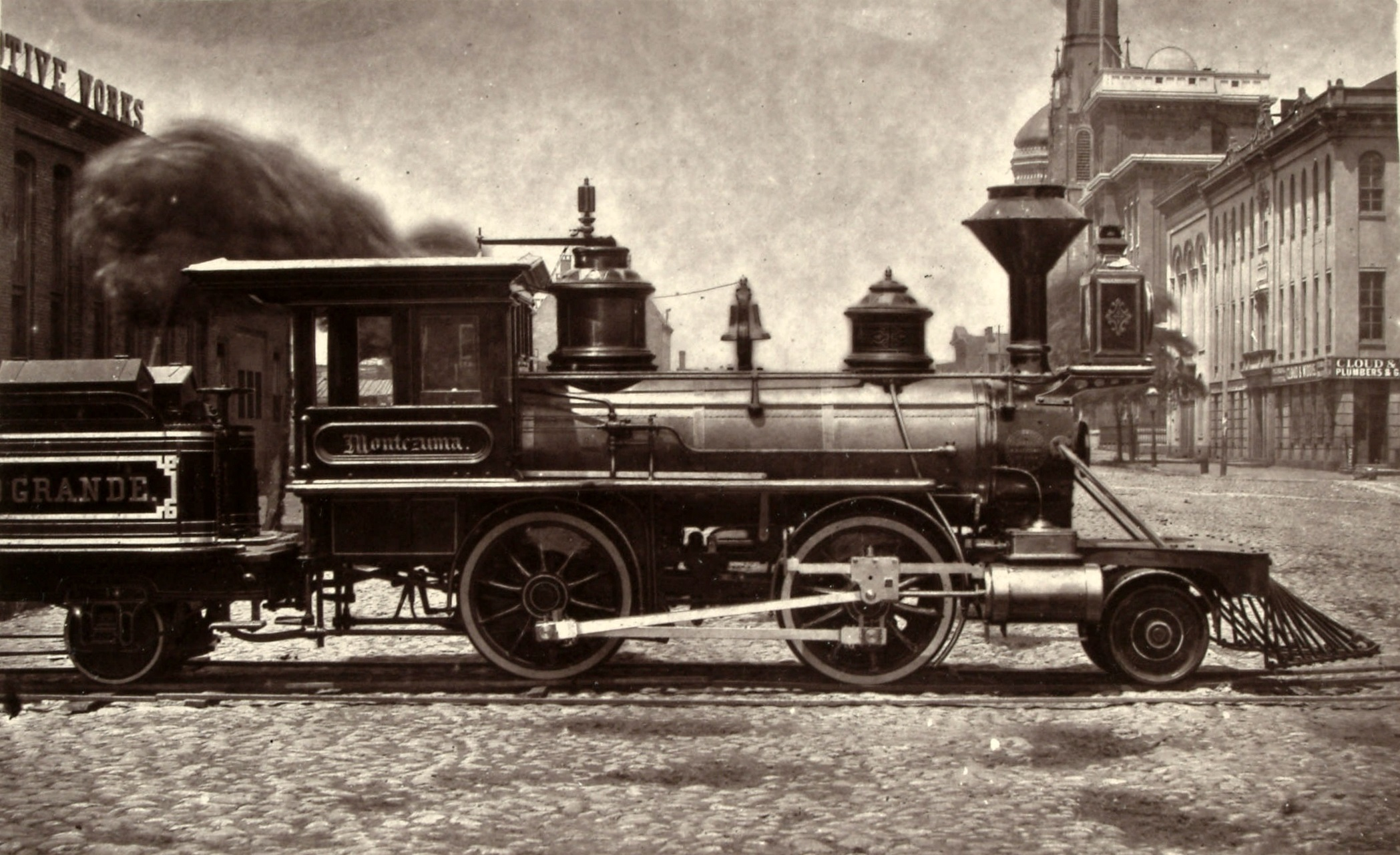
Baldwin's Montezuma of 1871, the first locomotive built for the Denver & Rio Grande

In the collection of the California State Railroad Museum is the J.W. Bowker locomotive, a 2-4-0 engine built by Baldwin Locomotive Works in 1875 for the Virginia and Truckee Railroad. Today, the J.W. Bowker is the sole remaining Baldwin 2-4-0 in existence from the Virginia and Truckee Railroad.

At the Cedar Point amusement park in Sandusky, Ohio, four 2-4-0s run tourist trains around a 2 mi (3.2 km) loop of track alongside Lake Erie and pass many of the park's attractions. Two of the 2-4-0s were built by Vulcan Iron Works as 0-4-0Ts in 1922 and 1923 and now run as the Myron H. no. 22 and Judy K. no. 44 respectively. They are the two main engines for the Cedar Point & Lake Erie Railroad. The third engine was built by H.K. Porter, Inc. as an 0-4-0T in 1942 and now runs as the George R. no. 4. The fourth engine was built by Davenport Locomotive Works as a 2-4-4T in 1927 and now runs as the G. A. Boeckling no. 1. No. 1 was converted from oil-burning in 2010 and all engines now run on coal. The John Bull is often mistaken as a 2-4-0 when John Bull is a 4-2-0

=== Cuba ===
Cuba manly used 2-4-0's in industrial plants (like the Central Simon Bolivar sugar mill number 1167 or the Central Santa Marta Locomotive number 1).

=== Japan ===
The Japanese National Railways (JNR) class 90, class 105, class 120 JGR Class 150, JGR Class 160, class 190, and JGR class A3 were 2-4-0's imported into Japan. The JGR class A3 was later imported to Taiwan.
