= Laithwaite =

Laithwaite is a surname. Notable people with the surname include:

- Eric Laithwaite (1921–1997), English electrical engineer
- Sir Gilbert Laithwaite (1894–1986), Irish-British civil servant and diplomat
- James Laithwaite (born 1991), English rugby league player
- Peter Laithwaite (born 1967), English entrepreneur and technologist
