= Grade II listed buildings in Brighton and Hove: N–O =

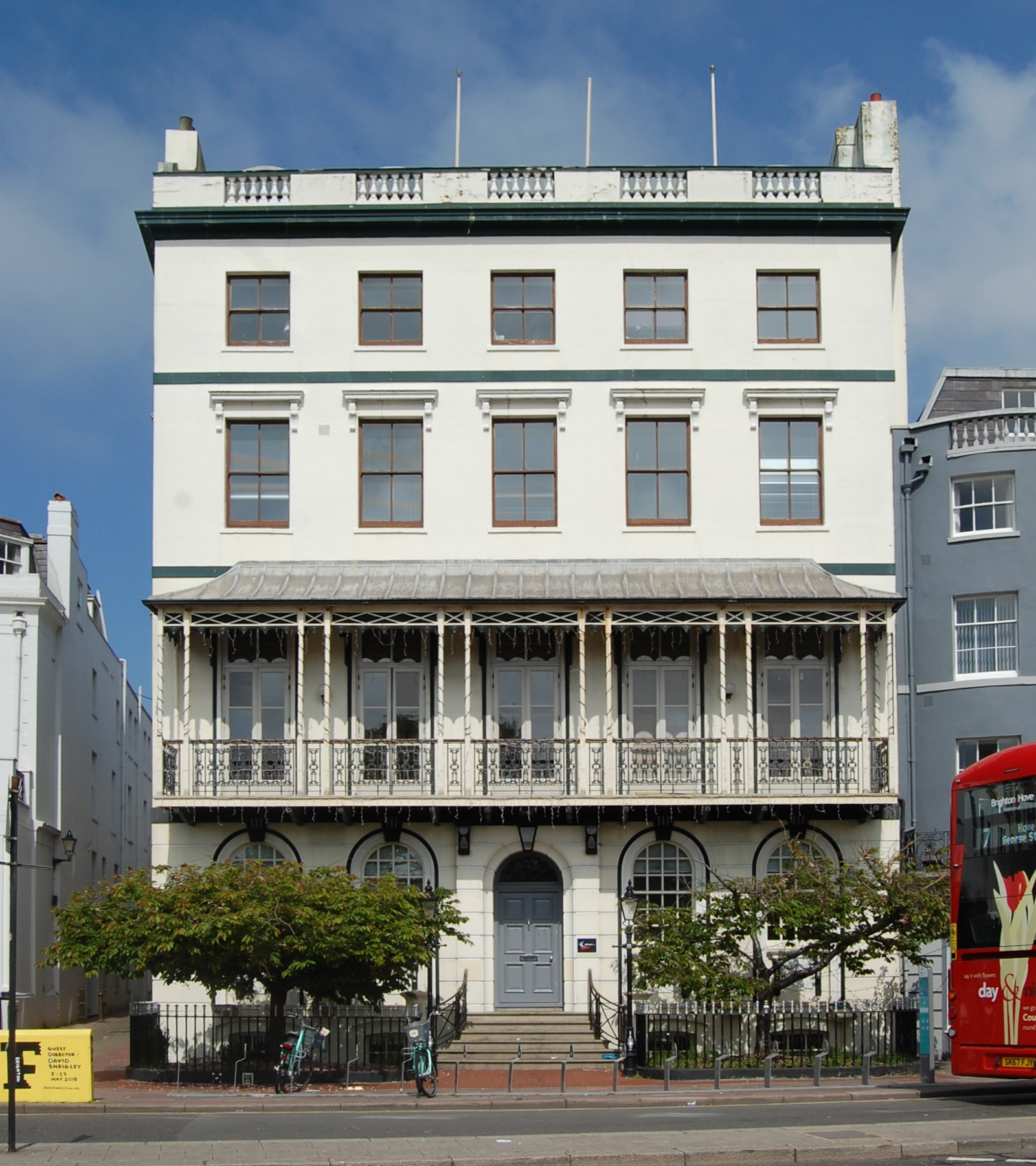
Blenheim House, the building at 56 Old Steine, was rebuilt in 1875 to the design of Clayton & Black and was later altered to make it more Regency-style.

As of February 2001, there were 1,124 listed buildings with Grade II status in the English city of Brighton and Hove. The total at 2009 was similar. The city, on the English Channel coast approximately 52 miles (84 km) south of London, was formed as a unitary authority in 1997 by the merger of the neighbouring towns of Brighton and Hove. Queen Elizabeth II granted city status in 2000.

In England, a building or structure is defined as "listed" when it is placed on a statutory register of buildings of "special architectural or historic interest" by the Secretary of State for Culture, Media and Sport, a Government department, in accordance with the Planning (Listed Buildings and Conservation Areas) Act 1990. English Heritage, a non-departmental public body, acts as an agency of this department to administer the process and advise the department on relevant issues. There are three grades of listing status. The Grade II designation is the lowest, and is used for "nationally important buildings of special interest". Grade II* is used for "particularly important buildings of more than special interest"; there are 69 such buildings in the city. There are also 24 Grade I listed buildings (defined as being of "exceptional interest" and greater than national importance, and the highest of the three grades) in Brighton and Hove.

This list summarises 89 Grade II-listed buildings and structures whose names begin with N or O. Numbered buildings with no individual name are listed by the name of the street they stand on. Some listings include contributory fixtures such as surrounding walls or railings in front of the building. These are summarised by notes alongside the building name.

== Listed buildings ==
Contributory fixtures
Note	Listing includes
^{[A]}	Attached railings
^{[B]}	Attached walls
^{[C]}	Attached walls and railings
^{[D]}	Attached walls, piers and railings
^{[E]}	Attached balustrades
^{[F]}	Attached colonnade

Building name	Area	Image	Notes	Refs
National Westminster Bank, Pavilion Buildings (More images)	Brighton; 50.8219°N 0.1383°W		Godfrey Pinkerton's "stately" and "highly crafted" bank branch building was erected on the corner of Castle Square and Pavilion Buildings in 1905 for the London and County Bank. Contrasting bands of stone in pale red and white make up the ground floor, in which the windows and corner entrance are slightly recessed. They are set in stone surrounds and supported on metal columns upon which rest "exaggeratedly overhanging tops" decorated with anthemion carvings. Similarly elaborate window surrounds are found on the three storeys above, which are in pale Ancaster stone.	
National Westminster Bank, Western Road^{[B]}	Brighton; 50.8245°N 0.1510°W		.	
New Barn (More images)	Rottingdean; 50.8144°N 0.0621°W		This flint and brick complex of farm buildings was built in three stages. The main barn, of five bays and with east and west entrances for carts, is 18th-century and retains its original Queen post timber roof and purlins. Another three bays were added to the south in the early 19th century, and some hipped-roofed stables were attached to the north side during the same century.	
New England Road railway bridge (More images)	New England Quarter; 50.8334°N 0.1416°W		.	
New England Viaduct (More images)	New England Quarter; 50.8331°N 0.1424°W		.	
1–7 New Road^{[F]}	North Laine; 50.8230°N 0.1399°W		.	
21 and 22 New Road^{[A]}	North Laine; 50.8238°N 0.1395°W		.	
23 New Road^{[A]}	North Laine; 50.8240°N 0.1393°W		.	
30 New Road	North Laine; 50.8228°N 0.1396°W		.	
1 New Steine^{[A]}	East Cliff; 50.8196°N 0.1322°W		.	
2–15 New Steine^{[A]}	East Cliff; 50.8200°N 0.1321°W		.	
18–24 New Steine^{[A]}	East Cliff; 50.8200°N 0.1314°W		.	
28–31 New Steine^{[A]}	East Cliff; 50.8196°N 0.1315°W		.	
New Venture Theatre Club^{[B]}	Brighton; 50.8240°N 0.1540°W		This was built in 1841 as a junior school for the now demolished Christ Church, which was to the rear. In 1862 it was described as "schools for the Middle Classes, erected in 1843 [sic] by Wisden and Anscombe". The Wisden name was shared by several local builders and property owners. The original part was the Tudor Gothic cobble-fronted single-storey part at the front; the large, gabled two-storey brick extension behind dates from the 1890s. A frieze above the entrance reads christ church schools erected ad 1841. The building was converted into a ballet school in the 1970s, then became a theatre.	
1 Nile Street	The Lanes; 50.8212°N 0.1405°W		.	
2, 2a and 3 Nile Street	The Lanes; 50.8212°N 0.1406°W		.	
Norfolk Hotel (More images)	Brighton; 50.8229°N 0.1554°W		.	
1 and 2 Norfolk Road^{[A]}	Montpelier; 50.8253°N 0.1549°W		.	
3 Norfolk Road^{[A]}	Montpelier; 50.8254°N 0.1548°W		.	
7 and 8 Norfolk Road^{[A]}	Montpelier; 50.8257°N 0.1547°W		.	
18 Norfolk Road^{[A]}	Montpelier; 50.8261°N 0.1544°W		.	
24–26 Norfolk Road	Montpelier; 50.8265°N 0.1542°W		.	
37–39 Norfolk Road^{[A]}	Montpelier; 50.8260°N 0.1541°W		.	
41 and 42 Norfolk Road^{[A]}	Montpelier; 50.8258°N 0.1542°W		.	
43 and 44 Norfolk Road^{[A]}	Montpelier; 50.8257°N 0.1543°W		.	
47 Norfolk Road	Montpelier; 50.8255°N 0.1544°W		.	
1–5 Norfolk Square^{[A]}	Brighton; 50.8249°N 0.1552°W		.	
11–15 Norfolk Square^{[A]}	Brighton; 50.8244°N 0.1555°W		.	
17 and 17a Norfolk Square^{[A]}	Brighton; 50.8242°N 0.1556°W		.	
22–29 Norfolk Square^{[B]}	Brighton; 50.8242°N 0.1550°W		.	
30–33 Norfolk Square^{[A]}	Brighton; 50.8243°N 0.1546°W		.	
34 Norfolk Square^{[A]}	Brighton; 50.8254°N 0.1548°W		.	
35–45 Norfolk Square^{[A]}	Brighton; 50.8247°N 0.1543°W		.	
1–13 Norfolk Terrace^{[E]}	Montpelier; 50.8275°N 0.1536°W		.	
21–28 Norfolk Terrace^{[A]}	Montpelier; 50.8270°N 0.1535°W		.	
North End House (More images)	Rottingdean; 50.8065°N 0.0594°W		.	
27 North Gardens^{[C]}	West Hill; 50.8274°N 0.1428°W		.	
Northgate Cottages	Rottingdean; 50.8087°N 0.0593°W		.	
North Lodge at Woodvale Cemetery (More images)	Brighton; 50.8363°N 0.1222°W		The lodge is larger of the two at the entrance to Woodvale Cemetery; it is two storeys high and is a flint-built Gothic Revival structure with stone dressings. It was originally provided for the cemetery gardeners, but now houses the city council's Bereavement Services division.	
19, 21 and 23 North Road	Preston Village; 50.8430°N 0.1529°W		.	
25 and 27 North Road	Preston Village; 50.8429°N 0.1530°W		.	
28 North Road	Preston Village; 50.8431°N 0.1529°W		.	
36 North Road	Preston Village; 50.8431°N 0.1531°W		.	
155–158 North Street (More images)	Brighton; 50.8231°N 0.1404°W		.	
163 North Street (More images)	Brighton; 50.8226°N 0.1396°W		.	
Norton House and The Penthouse	Rottingdean; 50.8063°N 0.0577°W		.	
Obelisk and Fountain at Victoria Gardens	Brighton; 50.8273°N 0.1351°W		.	
Ocean Hotel (former) (More images)	Saltdean; 50.8022°N 0.0358°W		.	
Octagonal Pavilion, Preston Park	Preston Park; 50.8394°N 0.1462°W		.	
Old Cottage, Little Barn and Mulberry Cottage	Preston Village; 50.8422°N 0.1524°W		.	
Olde Place Hotel (former)	Rottingdean; 50.8056°N 0.0589°W		.	
Old Fire Station (More images)	East Cliff; 50.8193°N 0.1286°W		.	
45, 45a and 47 Old London Road	Patcham; 50.8635°N 0.1510°W		.	
49 Old London Road	Patcham; 50.8636°N 0.1511°W		.	
53, 55 and 57 Old London Road	Patcham; 50.8640°N 0.1515°W		.	
106 and 108 Old London Road	Patcham; 50.8639°N 0.1511°W		.	
110 and 112 Old London Road	Patcham; 50.8641°N 0.1513°W		.	
124 and 126 Old London Road	Patcham; 50.8644°N 0.1517°W		.	
128–136 Old London Road	Patcham; 50.8645°N 0.1518°W		.	
Old Market (More images)	Brunswick Town; 50.8246°N 0.1574°W		.	
Old Reading Room at The Esplanade (More images)	Kemp Town; 50.8150°N 0.1116°W		.	
3 Old Steine^{[A]}	Brighton; 50.8219°N 0.1363°W		.	
4 Old Steine^{[A]}	Brighton; 50.8219°N 0.1362°W		.	
6 and 7 Old Steine^{[A]}	Brighton; 50.8217°N 0.1361°W		.	
8 Old Steine^{[A]}	Brighton; 50.8216°N 0.1362°W		.	
9 and 10 Old Steine^{[A]}	Brighton; 50.8215°N 0.1362°W		.	
11 Old Steine^{[A]}	Brighton; 50.8215°N 0.1363°W		.	
12 Old Steine^{[A]}	Brighton; 50.8214°N 0.1363°W		.	
20 Old Steine^{[A]}	Brighton; 50.8208°N 0.1364°W		.	
21 Old Steine^{[A]}	Brighton; 50.8207°N 0.1364°W		.	
22 Old Steine^{[A]}	Brighton; 50.8206°N 0.1364°W		.	
23 Old Steine^{[A]}	Brighton; 50.8206°N 0.1365°W		.	
24 and 25 Old Steine	Brighton; 50.8205°N 0.1365°W		.	
26 Old Steine^{[A]}	Brighton; 50.8204°N 0.1364°W		.	
27 Old Steine^{[A]}	Brighton; 50.8204°N 0.1365°W		.	
28 Old Steine^{[A]}	Brighton; 50.8203°N 0.1364°W		.	
29 Old Steine^{[A]}	Brighton; 50.8203°N 0.1365°W		.	
30 Old Steine^{[A]}	Brighton; 50.8202°N 0.1365°W		.	
31 Old Steine	Brighton; 50.8202°N 0.1364°W		.	
44 Old Steine^{[A]}	Brighton; 50.8203°N 0.1385°W		.	
47 Old Steine	Brighton; 50.8204°N 0.1387°W		.	
51 Old Steine^{[A]}	Brighton; 50.8208°N 0.1388°W		.	
52 Old Steine	Brighton; 50.8208°N 0.1387°W		.	
53 Old Steine	Brighton; 50.8209°N 0.1387°W		.	
56 Old Steine^{[D]} (More images)	Brighton; 50.8212°N 0.1381°W		.	
Olivier House^{[A]}	East Cliff; 50.8203°N 0.1340°W		.	
16 and 17 Orange Row	North Laine; 50.8255°N 0.1396°W		.	
Ovingdean Grange (More images)	Ovingdean; 50.8165°N 0.0762°W		.	
Ovingdean Hall School (More images)	Ovingdean; 50.8175°N 0.0751°W		.	

== See also ==
- Buildings and architecture of Brighton and Hove
- Grade I listed buildings in Brighton and Hove
- Grade II* listed buildings in Brighton and Hove
- List of conservation areas in Brighton and Hove
