= Harry Brünjes =

British businesspeople (born 1954)

Harry Brünjes CBE FRSM
- Born: 15 October 1954; Norwich, England
- Education: Bedford Modern School
- Alma mater: St Thomas's Hospital Medical School; Guy's Hospital Medical School
- Occupations: Physician and businessman
- Known for: Founder of the Premier Medical Group

Henry Otto Brünjes (born 15 October 1954) is a physician and founder of the Premier Medical Group. He has been a fellow and governor of the Expert Witness Institute since 2002, a Fellow of the Woodard Corporation since 2004, and a founding fellow and vice-president of The College of Medicine (2009). He was chairman of Rapid Trauma and Assessment (2000–06), the Personal Injury Forum of Bupa (2004–07) and Newmans Clinics (2011–). He was made chairman of the English National Opera in 2015.

== Early life, education, and family ==
Brünjes was born in Norwich on 15 October 1954 and grew up around Great Yarmouth, Norfolk. He is the son of Harry Brünjes of The Singing Scott Brothers, who went on to become a headmaster at Alameda School. His mother was also a teacher. He was educated at Bedford Modern School, St Thomas's Hospital Medical School and Guy's Hospital Medical School. During his university career Brünjes worked as a professional pianist and television actor but abandoned entertainment to concentrate on medicine.

Brünjes is married to the singer, dancer, choreographer and director Jacqueline Storey. They met while performing together at a show in Newquay. The couple have four children. Emma Brunjes is his daughter.

Brünjes and his wife live at Folkington Manor. The couple bought the historic house, a Grade II listed property, in 2010 and then carried out a multi-million pound restoration. The house was opened for public tours in 2014. Brünjes and his wife have restored numerous other properties including Ovingdean Grange.

== Career ==
Brünjes worked as a junior doctor in the Casualty department of the Royal Sussex County Hospital in Brighton and was on duty on the night of the Grand Hotel IRA bomb blast in 1984.

He joined the Rottingdean General Practiotioner practice in East Sussex in 1985. He became a senior partner after five years.

In 1995, Brünjes founded what would become Premier Medical Group after working in the NHS for 14 years. He founded Premier after noticing an increasingly large number of patients willing to pay for private healthcare. The practice started in a small office on Harley Street and took on the Premier Medical name in 1996. Brünjes started hiring additional doctors into his practice the same year. Premier continued to expand operations as sales grew. Speaking of the time Brünjes said, "It was a stretch financially. I took out loans with the banks and had my house on the line." In 2003, Jason Powell, head of innovation for Bupa, joined Premier as CEO. Brünjes worked with Powell to develop a strategy for further expansion through acquisitions instead of focusing on organic growth.

Many of Premier's smaller acquisitions were funded via cash flow. In 2008, Brünjes led Premier's acquisition of Medico-Legal Reporting, a rival firm, with financing from the investment bank Nomura. Under his leadership the firm expanded to run 220 clinics across the United Kingdom. The business was sold in 2010 to Capita for £60 million; Brünjes remained as non-executive chairman after the sale.

After the sale of Premier, Brünjes started work on other business opportunities including real estate. Prior to the sale of Premier, he had already spent 13 years restoring a listed manor house; he sold the house to comedian Steve Coogan for £2.4 million. In 2011, Brünjes established Woodsta, a venture capital fund specialising in healthcare. Woodsta acquired Dr Newman's Clinic, which specialises in treating thread veins. Brünjes immediately moved to expand Dr Newman's across the United Kingdom. Brünjes has expressed interest in investing in obesity and elderly care related ventures.

Brünjes bought a controlling share of Premier Medical back from Capita in 2016. Capita retained some equity in Premier but has no operational control. Brünjes is working to expand the firm with a particular emphasis on the personal injury market.

Since 2015 Brunjes has been Chairman of WARP, a medical software technology company.

In recent years Brunjes has performed in a docudrama 'Dial Medicine for Murder'. This has involved two seasons at The Gilded Balloon at the Edinburgh Festival and a national tour.

Brünjes is a regular writer, broadcaster, and lecturer.

== Non-profit work ==
Since 2015, Brünjes has been chairman of English National Opera (ENO). Brünjes was appointed to this position after the resignation of Martyn Rose. Brünjes had previously served on the ENO's board as a non-executive trustee for five years.

Since 2012 he has been a member of the Southwark Cathedral Development Trust. He was Chairman of Lancing College from 2009 to 2019 and was previously a governor of Bedford Modern School (2004–07). Brünjes has been a fellow and governor of the Expert Witness Institute since 2002, a fellow of the Woodard Corporation since 2004, a founding fellow of The College of Medicine (2009) and a former vice-president.
