= Cape Town Railway & Dock 2-4-0T =

South African steam locomotive

Cape Town Railway & Dock 2-4-0T Wynberg Railway 2-4-0T CGR 2-4-0T
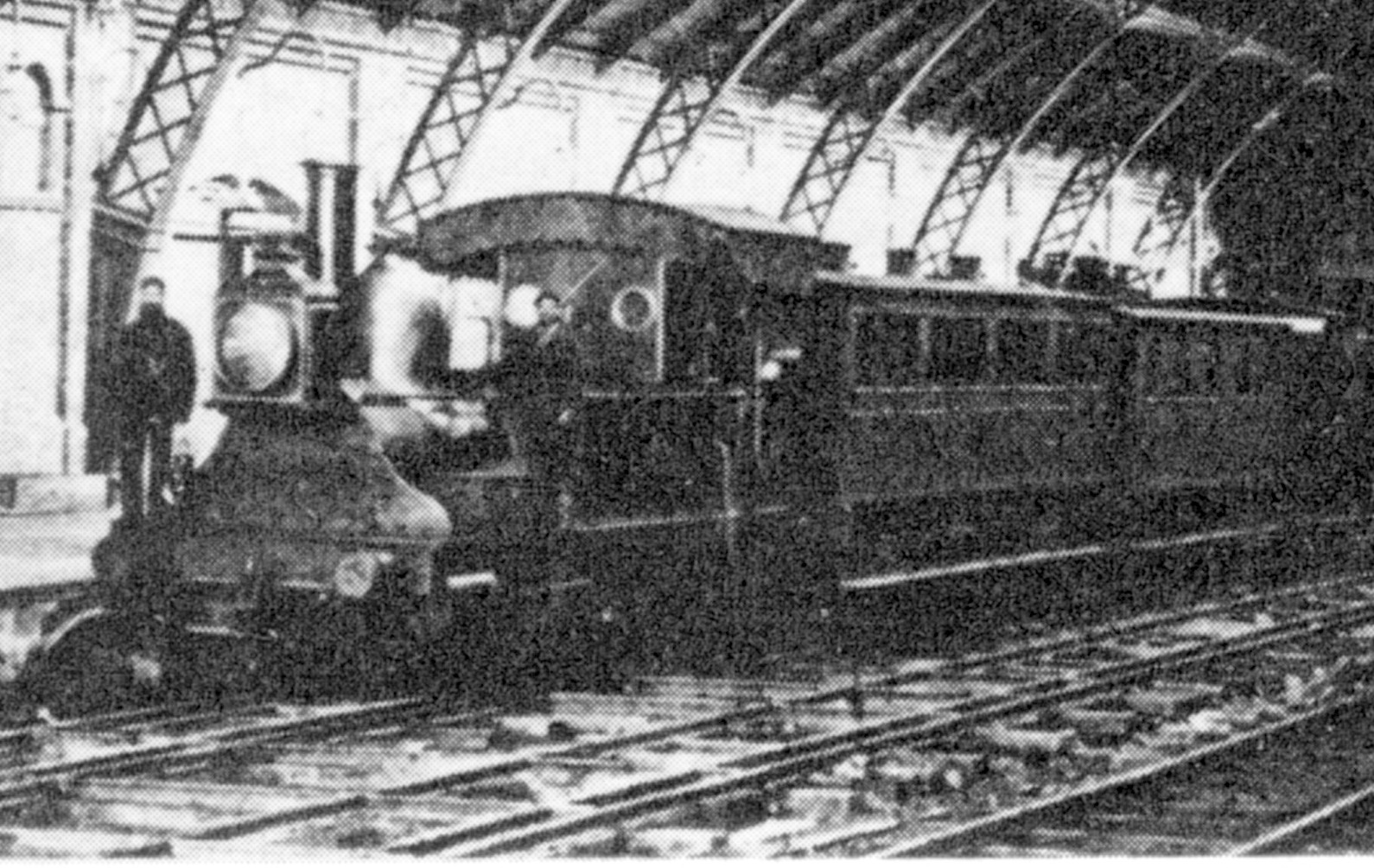
- Cape Town Railway & Dock 2-4-0T no. 10 Ebden on a suburban train in Cape Town station, c. 1879, with dual-gauge tracks already in use
Type and origin
- Power type: Steam
- Designer: Robert Stephenson and Company
- Builder: Robert Stephenson and Company
- Serial number: 1467, 1550, 1599
- Build date: 1864
- Total produced: 3
Specifications
- Configuration
  - Whyte: 2-4-0T
  - UIC: 1Bn2t
- Driver: 2nd coupled axle
- Gauge: 4 ft 8 1/2 in (1,435 mm) standard gauge
- Leading dia.: 36 in (914 mm)
- Coupled dia.: 54 in (1,372 mm)
- Axle load: 10 LT (10,160 kg)
  - Leading: 8 LT (8,128 kg)
  - 1st coupled: 10 LT (10,160 kg)
  - 2nd coupled: 9 LT (9,144 kg)
- Adhesive weight: 19 LT (19,300 kg)
- Loco weight: 27 LT (27,430 kg)
- Fuel type: Coal
- Firebox
  - Type: Round-top
- Boiler pressure: 120 psi (827 kPa)
- Safety valve: Salter
- Cylinders: Two outside
- Cylinder size: 14 1/2 in (368 mm) bore 22 in (559 mm) stroke
- Valve gear: Stephenson
- Couplers: Buffers-and-chain
Career
- Operators: Wynberg Railway; Cape Town Railway & Dock; Cape Government Railways
- Number in class: 3
- Numbers: 10-12
- Delivered: 1864-65
- First run: 1864
- Last run: 1881
- Withdrawn: 1881

The Cape Town Railway & Dock 2-4-0T of 1864 was a South African steam locomotive from the pre-Union era in the Cape of Good Hope.

A railway line between Salt River and Wynberg, constructed with private capital, was opened to the public on 19 December 1864. Three 2-4-0T locomotives were acquired as motive power for the line, one by the Wynberg Railway Company and the other two by the Cape Town Railway and Dock Company, who undertook to rent and operate the Wynberg line.

In 1872, the locomotives came onto the roster of the Cape Government Railways when it took over the operation of all railways in the Cape of Good Hope. They remained in service on the Wynberg line until after its conversion to dual gauge broad-and-Cape gauges, which began around 1872, and were retired in 1881 when sufficient Cape gauge locomotives were in service.

== Wynberg Railway ==
While the 4 ft 8 1/2 in (1,435 mm) broad gauge Cape Town-Wellington Railway was still being built, the independent Wynberg Railway Company was formed. It constructed a broad gauge line to Wynberg from a junction with the Wellington line at Salt River. Work commenced on 19 December 1862 and the line was completed and opened to traffic two years later to the day, on 19 December 1864. The company acquired one 2-4-0T locomotive from Robert Stephenson and Company and named it after Mr. Watson, the general manager. When the Cape Government Railways was established, this locomotive became its engine no. 12.

The 27 long tons (27.4 metric tons; 30.2 short tons) locomotive had cylinders outside its frame and was equipped with Stephenson Link valve gear.

== Cape Town Railway and Dock ==
Operation of the line was contracted to the Cape Town Railway and Dock Company at a rental of £3,600 per year. The new Wynberg line proved to be popular and it was soon found necessary to acquire additional locomotives to cope with the rapidly increasing passenger traffic on the Cape's first suburban line. Early in 1865, two more 2-4-0T locomotives, identical to the first and numbered 10 and 11, were delivered to Cape Town Railway and Dock from Robert Stephenson and Company. As was the practice then they were also named, in this case after two of the directors of the company.

Very little is known about these locomotives and author Frank Holland could not find sufficient information about them to prepare a dimensional diagram like he had with most other locomotives described in his publications of 1971 and 1972. In addition very few photographs of them exist, since photography was still new technology at the Cape in the 1860s.

These three locomotives, together with the eight 0-4-2 tender locomotives, worked the Cape Town-Wynberg and Cape Town-Wellington lines respectively, from the time they were opened to traffic until well after the time the Cape Government Railways was established and the Wynberg Railway Company and Cape Town Railway and Dock Company ceased to exist.

== Cape Government Railways ==
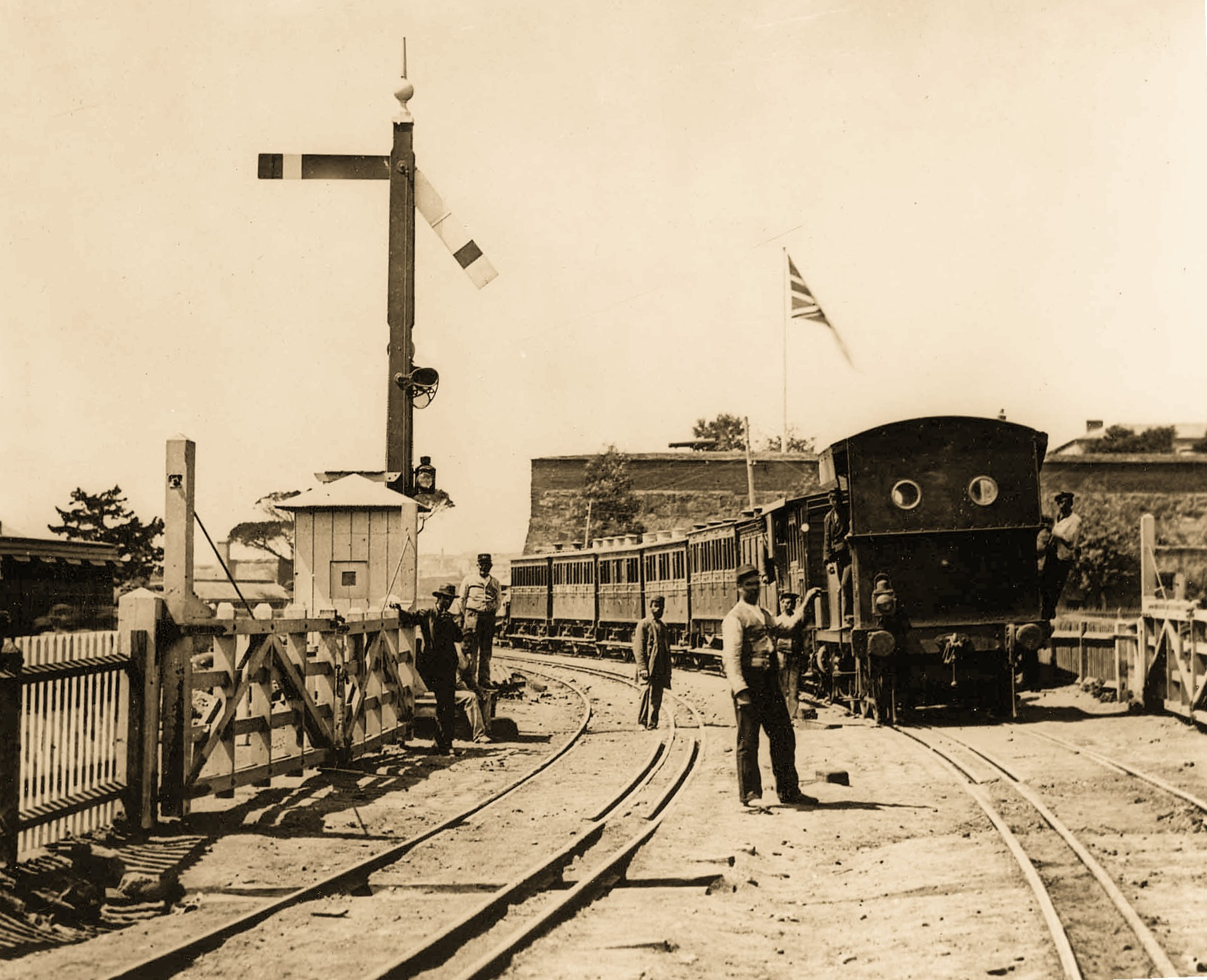
A 2-4-0T locomotive entering Cape Town station on dual gauge track at the old Strand street level crossing, with the Castle of Good Hope in the background, c. 1880

Following the passing of Cape Act no. 10 in December 1872, the Colonial government established the Cape Government Railways to undertake the management and construction of railways in the Cape of Good Hope. In 1873, it purchased the Cape Town-Wellington Railway for the sum of £773,000 and, in 1875, the Salt River-Wynberg line for the sum of £75,000.

No more broad gauge locomotives were acquired, since it had been decided by Parliament to continue railway construction from Wellington into the interior, but to use the narrower 3 ft 6 in (1,067 mm) gauge, later to become almost universally known as Cape gauge. This gauge was decided upon since it would decrease the cost of construction through the difficult terrain beyond the coastal plain and up the Hex River mountains.

While the new Cape gauge line was being constructed, the existing broad gauge lines were dual-gauged. The Cape Town-Wellington and Salt River-Wynberg sections were eventually worked by locomotives of both gauges.

== Disposal ==
The locomotives remained in service until 1881, when sufficient numbers of Cape gauge locomotives were in service and it was decided to remove all broad gauge track and rolling stock. The broad gauge track's 65 pounds per yard (32 kilograms per metre) iron rails were lifted and the track was relaid to Cape gauge as rapidly as possible, using 70 pounds per yard (35 kilograms per metre) steel rail sections on creosoted wooden sleepers. In that same year, the extension of the suburban line from Wynberg to Kalk Bay was authorised.

All the broad gauge 2-4-0T locomotives were dismantled, with the exception of their boilers. These were thoroughly overhauled and converted into stationary boilers, used to drive workshop machinery.

== Works numbers ==
The locomotive numbers, works numbers, original owners and names are listed in the table.

Cape Town Railway & Dock 2-4-0T
Loco no.	Works no.	First owner	Name
10	1550	CTR&D	Ebden
11	1599	CTR&D	Stein
12	1467	WRC	Watson
