= Peter Laithwaite =

Peter William Laithwaite (born 1967) is an English business entrepreneur and technologist. According to the Bolton News, he made his personal fortune after selling Recover Healthcare in 2013. Laithwaite is the CEO of several businesses across the UK. Laithwaite won SME Business of the Year at the Bolton and Bury Business Awards in 2012.

== Ventures ==
=== Medico-legal ===
Laithwaite joined the medico-legal industry in 2004, taking an executive position at e-witness Limited in Leeds. Over the next four years the business merged with Medical Report Services and ultimately concluded in a sale to Premier Medical Group. He left the business in December 2008 to pursue a new business venture.

In April 2009 Laithwaite set up Recover Healthcare Limited and React Medical Limited with Dr David Pearce. Both companies grew at a fast pace, managing thousands of personal injury claimants' medical and rehabilitation requirements. The companies gained a competitive edge by operating on bespoke cloud-based technology designed and written by an ‘in-house’ team, headed up by Dr David Pearce.

This software was "ePIsource", and was quickly commercialised, with the intellectual property held in iSaaS Technology Limited, a company incorporated in 2010. Both David and Peter were major shareholders, held a board position and played an active role in the development and success of the business.

In March 2013 shareholders of React Medical Limited, Recover Healthcare Limited and iSaaS Technology agreed to sell the companies to Quindell plc for a combined sum of circa £21 million. This consideration was made up of cash and Quindell plc shares based on the delivery of a warranted business plan. The warranted profits and cash collections were all exceeded, at which point Laithwaite and Pearce took the decision to leave the Quindell plc business to pursue a new venture.

In March 2015 they set up Qualitas Medical assurance, which offers software for medical evidence.

Laithwaite and Pearce are also co-founders of Nephos Solutions, delivering SaaS products to industries including aviation and the medico-legal sector. Nephos also spearhead the Nephos 100k Startup Challenge, an initiative aimed at identifying and supporting tech startups in the North West of England.

In March 2018, Laithwaite contributed to two reports from Coutts, The Art of the Business Exit and Life after a business exit, sharing his thoughts on the reality of selling a business and key advice entrepreneurs should be aware of before taking that step. Laithwaite notes that:

Understanding what our buyers really wanted transformed the deal that we did. Although we were selling three companies, it was the technology and the opportunity to lock me in to their business that they really wanted. By finding out where the fit was in our business we ended up going to market with a very different deal in shape and size to what we initially had in mind.

=== Panda Coffee Co ===
Laithwaite is also the owner of the high street coffee brand "Panda Coffee Co". The original coffee shop opened for business in a redeveloped period building in Bowkers Row, Bolton, in 2015, before the brand expanded across the North West of England.

=== Cube Construct ===
Laithwaite is the CEO of Cube Construct, a building contractor founded in 2015.

=== Panda Developments ===
Laithwaite is also co-founder of property development concern Panda Developments, founded after the establishment of Cube Construct. Panda Developments have previously undertaken a development project in Bolton town centre, opening a site in Nelson Square up to retail and new apartment buildings, and are currently developing the Old School House building in Bradshaw into a 15-apartment housing building.

=== Other work ===
Some of Laithwaite's other ventures include Citicare, a medical product and mobility aid purchasing platform. He also sits on the board of Hermit Offices, a residential-space office-sharing startup.

== Charity ==
Laithwaite's various business interests support community groups and charities in the region. These include Bolton Hospice and Bury Cricket Club.
