= The Old Market, Hove =

The Old Market
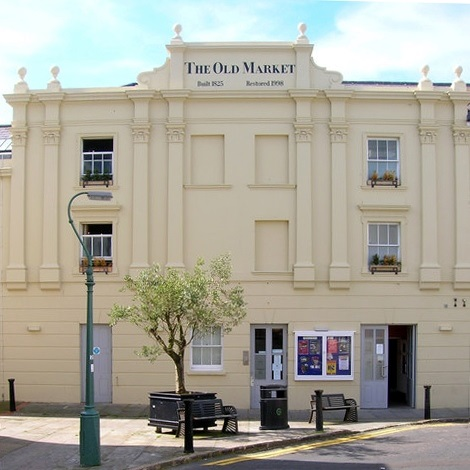
- Façade of The Old Market seen from the north

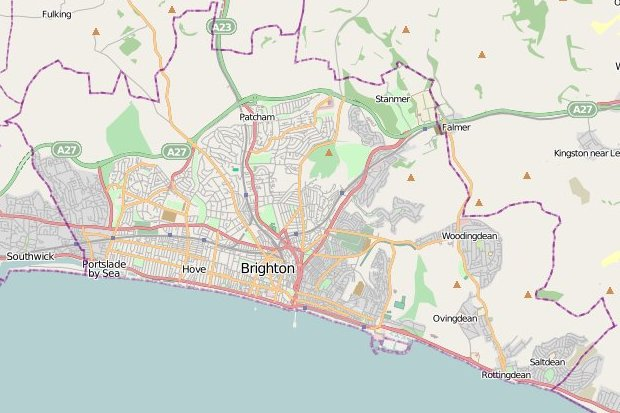
- Location within Brighton and Hove
- 50.8247°N 0.1574°W
- Location: 11a Upper Market Street, Hove, Brighton and Hove BN3 1AS, United Kingdom

History
- Built: 1825
- Rebuilt: c. 1888 (as stables)

Site notes
- Architect: Charles Busby
- Architectural style: Regency
- Restored: 1996–99; 2010
- Restored by: The Old Market Trust; Yes/No Productions
- Owner: Yes/No Productions

Listed Building – Grade II
- Official name: The Old Market
- Designated: 10 September 1971
- Reference no.: 1298651

The Old Market, Hove is a historic (grade II listed) building on the border of Brighton and Hove in England. It has served various functions, currently operating as an independent mixed-arts venue under the name "TOM – The Old Market".

== History ==
The Old Market was built in 1825 as a covered marketplace for sales of meat, fish and vegetables. It supplied the residential development of Brunswick, which was originally independent from Brighton and Hove village. As Brighton and Hove have grown up around it, the building has catered for changing needs, operating as a riding academy and stables, warehouse and, since the 1980s, as an arts venue. Established as Old Market Arts Centre (OMAC), the initial arts venture entered difficulties.

The building was renovated in 1998 by The Old Market Trust with a lottery grant of over four million pounds, as a home for The Hanover Band and a community arts venue for Brighton and Hove. Its current owners in 2010, Yes/No Productions (creators of the shows Stomp) made various changes in order to maximise potential use for gigs, theatre productions, events and performances after purchasing the building for £800,000. In 2011 the building was reopened under the new name TOM – The Old Market.

== Programming ==
Since it reopened in 2011, musicians such as Fatboy Slim, Sam Smith, Anna Calvi, Paul Weller, Kano, Frank Carter and the Rattlesnakes, Sleaford Mods and Morcheeba have performed at the venue, as well as comedians including Bill Bailey, Daniel Kitson, Katherine Ryan, Mark Thomas, Ricky Gervais, James Acaster, Bo Burnham, Sara Pascoe and Nish Kumar.

The venue also hosts theatre companies including 1927, Gecko and Paines Plough, and bespoke events are also hosted, such as in early May 2023, when YouTuber and Twitch streamer TommyInnit held a sketch comedy show at the venue as a build up to his upcoming tour. In December 2023, the venue launched an Immersive Gig programme. The new format sees audiences surrounded by 360º of digital projections, and the first events to take place included sets by Plaid, Orbital's Phil Hartnoll and three nights with Fatboy Slim.

The building acts as host for a number of festivals including Brighton Fringe, Brighton Festival and The Great Escape Festival during May.

The in-house venue programme is split into multiple strands:

- Reigning Women: Established in 2018, this is a multi-genre mini-season all about celebrating women both on and off stage.
- Gig for a Gig: A programme that sees established artists support the next generation by donating a performance at TOM. The proceeds then fund future performances by some of the brightest emerging talent in the industry.
- #TOMtech: An in-house programme that bridges the gap between traditional performance and new technology. The season also includes a LAB programme, that offers artists the opportunity to explore new tools, techniques and partnerships away from the pressures of production cycles.
- TOM's Film Club: A semi-regular art-house film club that champions both new releases and cult classics.

== See also ==
- Grade II listed buildings in Brighton and Hove: N–O
