= Ovingdean Hall School =

School for the deaf in East Sussex, England

Ovingdean Hall School now Oxford International College OIC Brighton
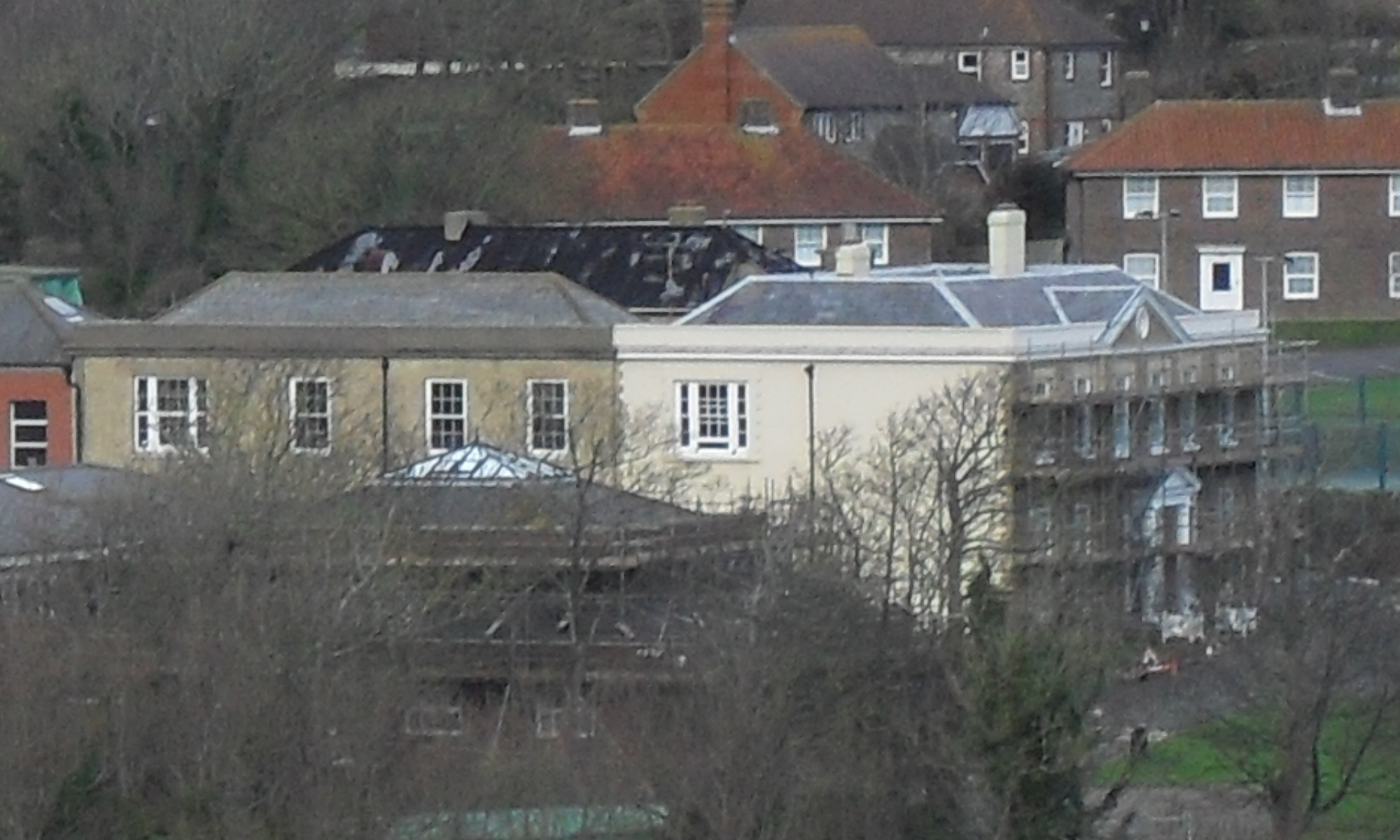

Location
- Greenways; Ovingdean; Brighton, East Sussex, BN2 7BJ; England; 50.81778°N 0.07558°W

Information
- Type: Former Non-Maintained Special School now Independent School
- Established: 1891 opened as OIC Brighton in 2023
- Closed: July 2010 reopened as OIC Brighton in 2023
- Local authority: Brighton and Hove
- Department for Education URN: 114676 Tables
- Gender: Coeducational
- Age: 11 to 19
- Website: http://www.ovingdeanhall.org.uk and https://www.oxcoll.com/brighton

Ovingdean Hall School (OHS) now OIC Brighton was a special day and boarding secondary school for the severely and profoundly deaf children and young people including those with additional disabilities. It closed in July 2010. The former school's site is in a rural setting in the village of Ovingdean, near Brighton, East Sussex, England. Many deaf and hard of hearing children attended the school from all over the UK and sometimes from other English-speaking nations. It was constituted as a registered charity under English law.

== Patrons ==
Veteran British actress Dame Judi Dench, and the former British Olympic champion Sally Gunnell, were patrons of the school. Dench once sent a special filmed message from a James Bond film set during the opening of the school's newly refurbished drama hall.

== Brief history ==
In 1788, Nathaniel Kemp—at the age of 27—bought a plot of land of 350 acres (1.4 km^{2}) in the centre of Ovingdean village. He built Ovingdean House there during 1792 at the cost of £2653-10s-0d (approximately). The house was later home of stained-glass artist Charles Eamer Kempe (1837–1907) and Thomas Read Kemp (1783–1844), the founder of Kemp Town in Brighton.

In 1891, Ovingdean House became a young gentlemen's school, which by that time was renamed Ovingdean Hall. Several extra school buildings were built by 1897. In 1941 the school moved to Devon during World War II, and the Canadian Army took over the Ovingdean site.

By the end of the war in 1945, it was sold to the Brighton Institution for the Deaf and Dumb school and in 1947 was reopened as a school that continued until the summer of 2010 as Ovingdean Hall School for the hearing impaired students from 11 to 19 years of age.

During 2008, the Hastings-based film company Toaster Productions has produced a special DVD documentary film entirely about the school and its pupils, entitled "Ovingdean Hall School: A very special special school". During the millennium, a short film about the school was also produced.

The school Governing Body had two former pupils of the school as Trustee Governors (from 2005 until its dissolution in 2010).

In August 2009, the Ovingdean Hall Reunion Association (see link below) held a (belated) 60th-anniversary grand reunion at the school, to celebrate the first 60 years of Ovingdean Hall School. Over 500 ex-pupils and their friends attended. This was followed with a final Farewell reunion in July 2010, as pupils learnt of the impending school closure. Over 600 ex-pupils and their friends came to see their alma mater for the last time. The school closed its doors for the final time at the end of the school year in July 2010 after declining pupil numbers meant it was no longer financially viable.

The school and its grounds were put up for sale on the open market by the Trustees. The Trust continued in its work after the school was closed and will use the monies from the sale to benefit young deaf learners in line with the existing aims of the charity.

== Interim Schools ==
In July 2012, the old school trust became Ovingdean Hall Foundation—a charity and grant-making organisation committed to supporting education projects for deaf young people. The Foundation works in partnership with two other deaf organisations: the Ewing Foundation and Burwood Park Foundation.

The former school site was sold off and became Ovingdean Hall International Language College (OHC). OHC closed in 2015.

The Malta-based EC Language School used the facilities for a summer residential English as a second language (EFL) school for overseas students aged 12–17 during the months of June to August in 2017 and 2018. The school's Director of Studies was D. Glen Segell who led a team of 20-plus teachers and over 400 students from 45-plus countries each summer. It received an excellent report from The British Council.

== Current Use ==
In September 2023, Nord Anglia Education, the parent company of Oxford International College opened, its new residential college at the site. It aims to undertake a substantial renovation. It is called Oxford International College (OIC) Brighton. The college provides residential all year round Pre-GCSE (Year 9), two-year IGCSE (From Year 10), one-year intensive IGCSE (Year 11), and two-year A-Level (from Year 12). During the summer of 2024 another company of the Nord Anglia Group namely Bucksmore Education will use the facilities to offer a summer residential English as a second language (EFL) school for overseas students aged 12–17 during the months of June to August.

== See also ==
- Grade II listed buildings in Brighton and Hove: N–O
