= Ovingdean =

Village in East Sussex, England

Coordinates: 50°48′52″N 0°04′26″W

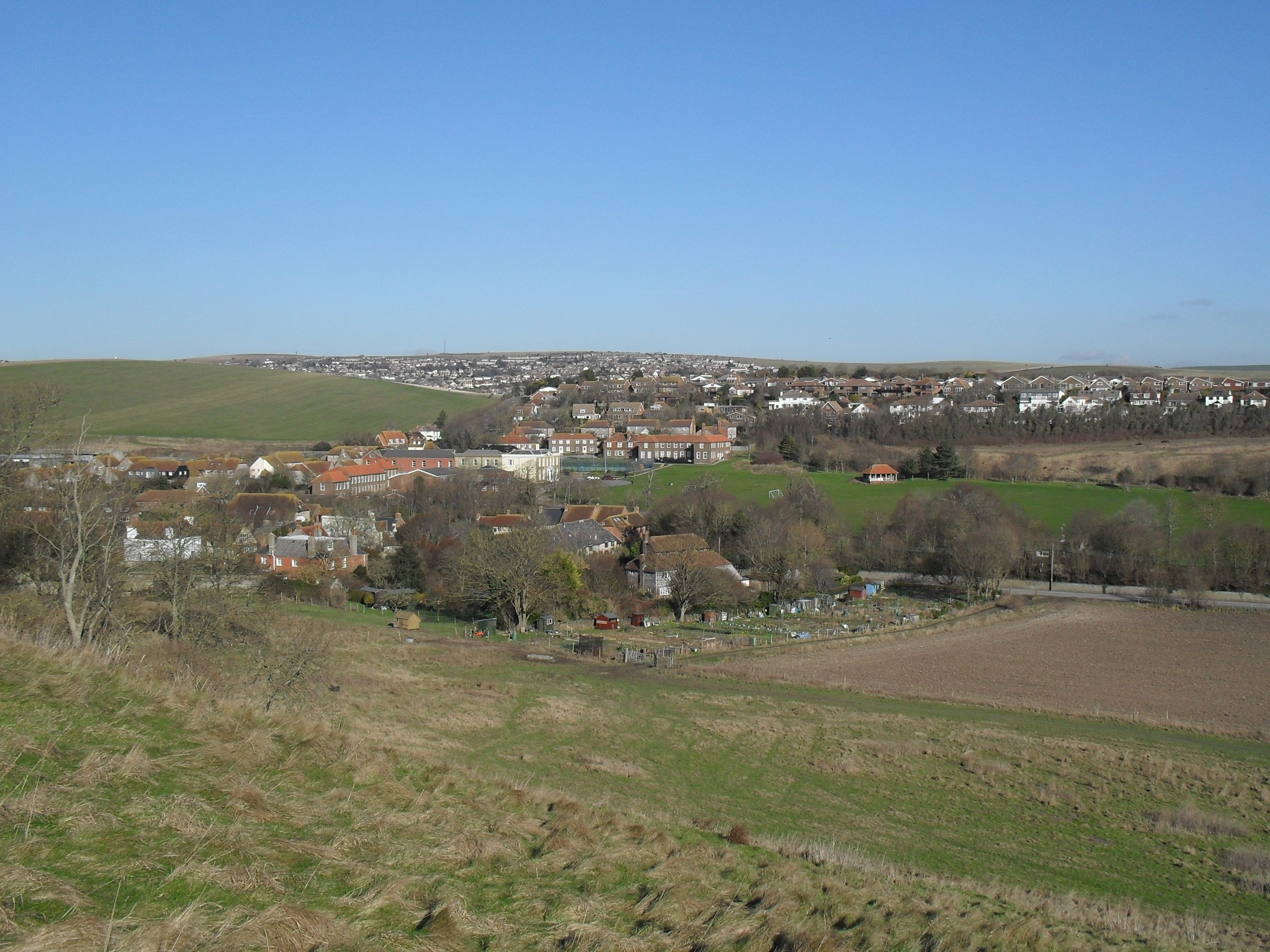
- View of Ovingdean from Cattle Hill

- Location within East Sussex
- Unitary authority: Brighton and Hove
- Ceremonial county: East Sussex
- Region: South East
- Country: England
- Sovereign state: United Kingdom
- Post town: BRIGHTON
- Postcode district: BN2
- Dialling code: 01273
- Police: Sussex
- Fire: East Sussex
- Ambulance: South East Coast
- UK Parliament: Brighton Kemptown

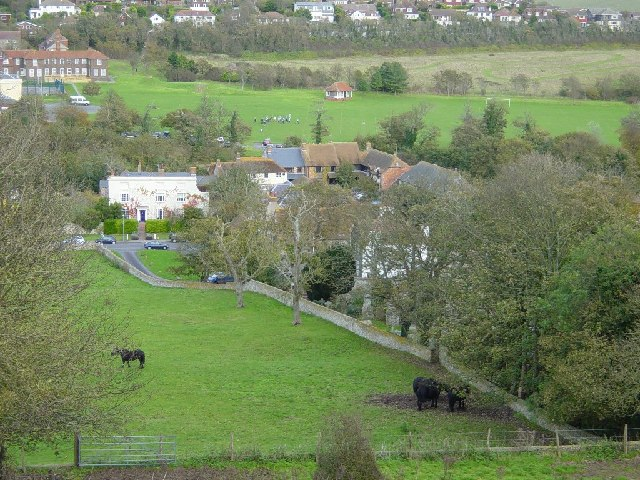
View of Ovingdean from Cattle Hill

Ovingdean is a small, formerly agricultural village on the eastern edge of the city of Brighton and Hove in the ceremonial county East Sussex, England.

== Overview ==
It has expanded through the growth of residential streets on its eastern and southern sides, and now has a population of about 1,200. Some of the current housing replaces earlier shacks of the type once found in neighbouring Woodingdean and Peacehaven, built after the First World War. It almost abuts Rottingdean to the south-east and Woodingdean to the north-east, but still has open downland on its other sides, on which may be found a golf course and Brighton racecourse as well as some residual farmland.

The name, which is Old English for 'the valley of people associated with a man called Ōfa', shows that the village has existed since Anglo-Saxon times. Little seems to have disturbed its peace since. It is sometimes said to have been attacked by French raiders in the known incursion of 1377, but there is no hard evidence for this. The historic village is a conservation area. Its focus is the 11th-century St Wulfram's Church. This dedication was only ever found in two other places in England (Grantham and Dorrington, both in Lincolnshire — it has vanished at Dorrington).

In 1921 the civil parish had a population of 476. On 1 April 1928 the parish was abolished and merged with Brighton.

Many homes in the conservation area are converted farm buildings, and the most prominent houses are Ovingdean Grange and Ovingdean Hall. The Grange is the subject of legend. In 1857, the popular novelist W. Harrison Ainsworth wrote Ovingdean Grange, A Tale Of The South Downs, in which he described how the future King Charles II stayed there for less than 24 hours before escaping to France in 1651, fathering a child in the process. In reality, the King stayed at the George Inn in West Street, Brighton. The Hall is a gentry mansion which was the birthplace of Charles Eamer Kempe, the stained glass window designer. It now serves as a language school for overseas residential students, Ovingdean Hall School. The majority of pupils are partially deaf or are equipped with cochlear implants. Longhill High School, a comprehensive school, is on the edge of the village, with its postal address in Rottingdean.

Among those buried in the churchyard are the inventor Magnus Volk, the stained-glass artist Charles Kempe and the distinguished lawyer Helena Normanton, one of the first female barristers and QCs. Also in the graveyard is a monument to the family of pioneer female medical student Sophia Jex-Blake, who is buried some 25 miles (40 km) away in Rotherfield.

The village has a single shop (a sub-post office) and no pubs.

Just outside the historic boundary of Ovingdean is Ian Fraser House, better known as St Dunstan's, a famous residential and rehabilitation centre for blind ex-servicemen. It was also the home of 113-year-old Henry Allingham, the last surviving founder-member of the RAF and briefly the world's oldest man.

Ovingdean is now the site of several proposed urban fringe sites due development under the Brighton and Hove City Plan.
