= Ovingdean Grange =

English manor house

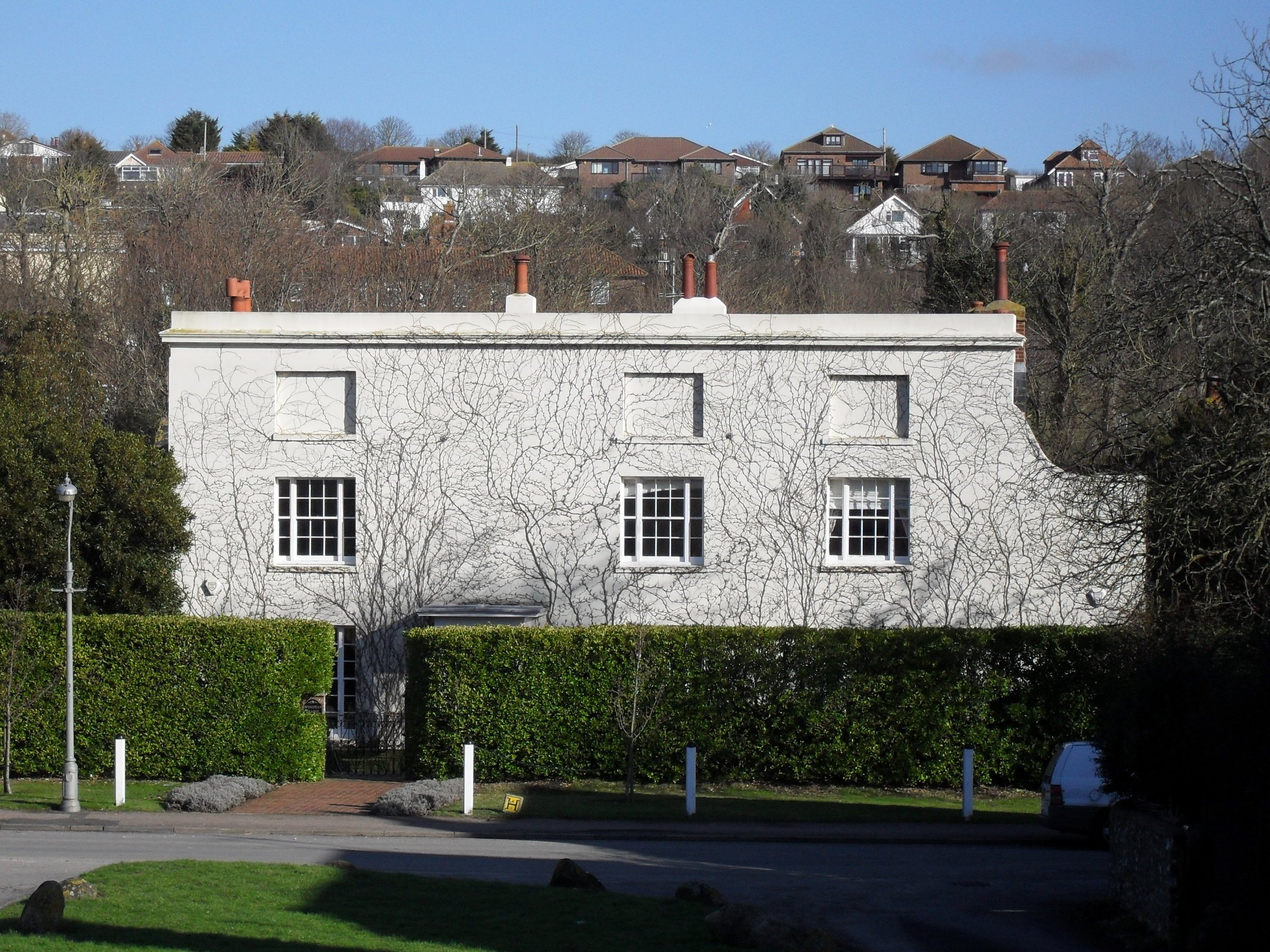
- Ovingdean Grange in 2010, seen from the southwest

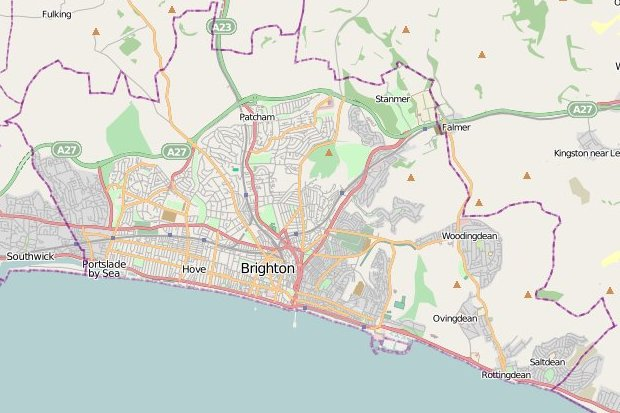
- Location within Brighton and Hove
- 50.8165°N 0.0763°W
- Location: Greenways, Ovingdean, Brighton and Hove, United Kingdom

History
- Built: c. 16th–17th century (as farmhouse)
- Rebuilt: c. 1835

Site notes
- Architectural style: Vernacular/Classical
- Restored: 1993

Listed Building – Grade II
- Official name: Ovingdean Grange
- Designated: 20 August 1971
- Reference no.: 1380552

Ovingdean Grange is a Grade II listed manor house situated on the south coast of England in the village of Ovingdean, east of Brighton. One of the oldest and most historical residences in Brighton, it gave its name to the novel Ovingdean Grange by the popular 19th-century writer William Harrison Ainsworth.

== History ==
Ovingdean is a small village just outside Brighton, where Ovingdean Grange is the oldest residence. The oldest building is the 11th-century parish church of St Wulfran's opposite Ovingdean Grange. Saxon farmhouses were first built in Ovingdean in the 11th century, and no firm evidence exists of when the Grange was built. Over much of its history, the Grange's occupants have acted as churchwarden for St Wulfran's. The north side, which was the original entrance, is the oldest part of the house, with flint walls and stone quoins like those of the church.

The first recorded occupier is Thomas Geere. He was baptized 1559 at Wivelsfield and is first recorded as living in Ovingdean in 1608 when his daughter's baptism was recorded in the church records though he may have moved to the Grange in around 1597 as baptisms for children are recorded at Rottingdean between 1586 and 1596. Ovingdean's registers do not start until 1704 but bishops transcripts for some years are available from 1606. A Conveyance (lease and release) dated 30 January 1691 from Harbert Springett to John Spence the younger of South Malling deposited at East Sussex Record Office refers to the manor or farm of Ovingdean being late Geere.

Over the years the house has seen many changes architecturally. As a Tudor manor house, the Grange had servants' quarters and a cellar below ground. Since then it has been altered, the most noticeable addition being the false Georgian façade in 1824.

The house was used as a family home in the 1900s. From 1945 the Grange was occupied by former Mayor of Brighton and local farmer Frank Masefield Baker, although, owing to the ill health of one of its inhabitants, it eventually fell into disrepair. Brighton Council eventually auctioned it in 1987. In 2011, the actor and comedian Steve Coogan bought it for £2.45 million.

Ovingdean Grange was listed at Grade II by English Heritage on 20 August 1971. This defines it as a "nationally important" building of "special interest". As of February 2001, it was one of 1,124 Grade II-listed buildings and structures, and 1,218 listed buildings of all grades, in the city of Brighton and Hove.

=== Lords of the Manor ===
It is unusual in that from approximately 1170 until 1987 the Lord of the manor who owned the Grange and its farmlands did not live in the village. Instead, the farm and the Grange were leased to tenants, who then farmed the land. The ownership of the manor estate from 1066 until today is known from legal conveyances and church documents, but knowledge of the identities of the tenant farmers is patchy.

== Namesakes ==
=== The novel Ovingdean Grange ===
The Grange is the subject of legend. In 1857, the popular novelist W. Harrison Ainsworth wrote Ovingdean Grange: A Tale of the South Downs, in which he described how the future King Charles II stayed there for less than 24 hours before escaping to France in 1651, fathering a child in the process. King Charles is reported to have sheltered in the chimney breast of the master bedroom.

=== SS Ovingdean Grange ===
The Ovingdean Grange was a Houlder Bros steamship in service under that name between 1946 and 1959.

== See also ==
- Grade II listed buildings in Brighton and Hove: N–O
- Media related to Ovingdean Grange at Wikimedia Commons
