= Premier Medical Group =

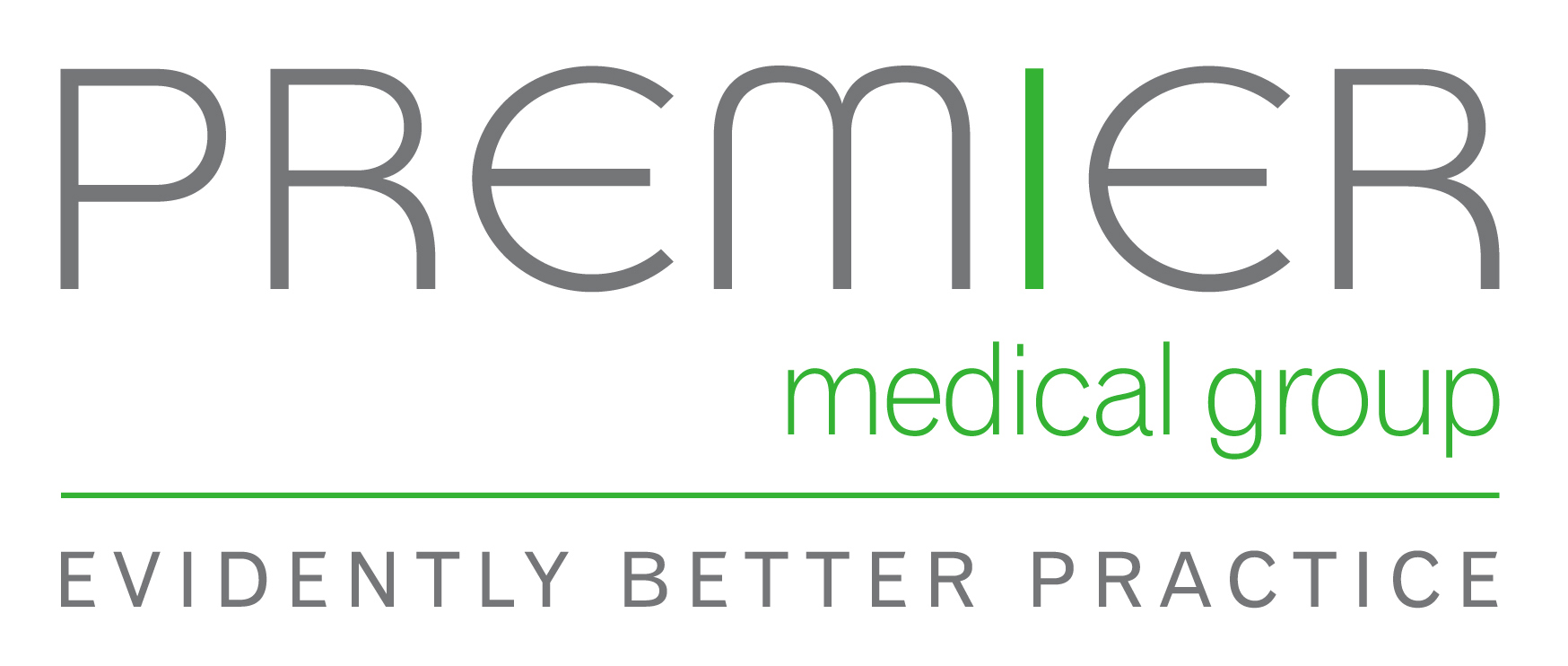
- Company type: Private
- Industry: Healthcare, Health Services Outsourcing, Medical Reporting
- Founded: 1995 by Harry Brünjes in Harley Street, London UK
- Headquarters: Ludlow, Ludlow, Shropshire, England
- Key people: Harry Brünjes (Chairman), Jason Powell (CEO)
- Products: Medico-legal reports, rehabilitation, life medicals, screening, occupational health, private GP clinics
- Revenue: £45 million
- Number of employees: 220
- Website: premiermedicalgroup.com

Premier Medical Group is a UK company that provides expert opinions for the legal and insurance industries, related to when people have been involved in car crashes and work place accidents resulting in a personal injury. The company currently employs 220 staff in three offices; Ludlow, Durham and Reading. The company was bought by Capita in 2010 for £61M. Harry Brünjes bought back a majority controlling share in 2016.

== History ==
The firm was formed in 1985 by Harry Brünjes, a clinician in Harley Street. Initially they performed medico-legal work for Russell Jones & Walker, Donne Mileham & Haddock and Healys Solicitors. In 1995, they won the national contract for the RAC which resulted in the necessity for a corporate identity. Subsequently, they obtained contracts with Groupama, A MMA, Norwich Union Rehabilitation, National Farmer’s Union, Co-op, Helphire and DAS. The firm developed a strategic relationship with the private healthcare group BUPA, and Brünjes was appointed Chairman of the Personal Injury Forum at BUPA.

== Corporate activity ==
The company developed a strategy of consolidation in the medico-legal sector and diversification into medical screening and occupational health. It added other corporate clients to the portfolios such as SAGA, AA AA, Fortis, Budget, Liverpool Victoria LV and RBS (including Direct Line and Churchill), while maintaining close relationships with large solicitors such as Freshfields Bruckhaus Deringer, Lyons Davidson, Shoosmiths, Pannone, Russell Jones & Walker and Parabis and CTTS.

In 2008 the firm acquired its major competitor, Medico-Legal Reporting; and acquired the assets of E-Reporting Group on a pre-pack agreement with KPMG.

The business was sold to Capita for £61M in 2010. Brünjes remained as Non-Executive Chairman after the sale. At the same time, Brünjes became Group Medical Director to Capita. In January 2016 Brünjes bought back a controlling share of Premier Medical from Capita. The business is now on three sites with operations in Ludlow and Durham. Finance is based in Reading. The company has completed a restructuring strategy and is growing both through organic and acquisition activity. In particular, Brünjes is now Chairman of WARP, a medical software technology company and part of the PMG Group.
