= Emma Brunjes =

British theatre producer

Emma Jacqueline Brünjes (born October 1981) is a theatre producer and general manager. She founded and runs the live entertainment firm ebp, and is a producer of the Edinburgh Comedy Awards.

== Education ==
Brünjes was a student at Windlesham School in Brighton and graduated from the London School of Economics, where she studied government and history.

== Career ==
Brünjes started acting while in school in Brighton. Her first performance was playing the Red Queen in her school's production of Alice in Wonderland. While a student at the London School of Economics, she worked as a waitress at Henry's in Covent Garden, and as an usher at the Royal Opera House.

She worked at Avalon Management as a junior marketing assistant, working alongside Frank Skinner, Harry Hill and Al Murray, and at the age of 25 was made Head of Promotions. While employed at Avalon, Brünjes also held a part-time position as a producer for Old Vic New Voices. She worked for three years with producer Nica Burns at Nimax Theatres and was made Nimax's General Manager of Productions and Programming.

Brünjes founded entertainment company ebp in 2013, and jointly runs it with her brother Ralph.

Her credits include Dead Funny, Olivier Award nominated Alice’s Adventures Underground, The Twits, and Freddie Flintoff’s 2nd Innings Tour. She produced The Game's Afoot at Madame Tussaud's, and has worked on the Edinburgh Comedy Awards and touring productions in the United Kingdom.

In 2015, Brünjes produced a show featuring her father, Henry Otto Brünjes, at the Edinburgh Fringe Festival called Dial Medicine for Murder, which told the story of Harold Shipman and John Bodkin Adams.

== Awards ==
Brünjes won the Old Vic New Voices new production award for Artefacts in 2006 and the Stage One Bursary award in 2007, and was nominated for an Olivier Award in 2016. She was listed in the Stage 100 list in 2017, but has not been included since.
