= Brunies =

Brunies is a surname. Notable people with the surname include:

- Albert Brunies (1900–1978, American jazz cornetist
- George Brunies (1902–1974), American jazz trombonist
- Merritt Brunies (1895–1973), American jazz trombonist and cornetist
- Steivan Brunies (1877–1953), Swiss teacher and environmental activist
