= Scott Brothers (manufacturers) =

New Zealand engineering company

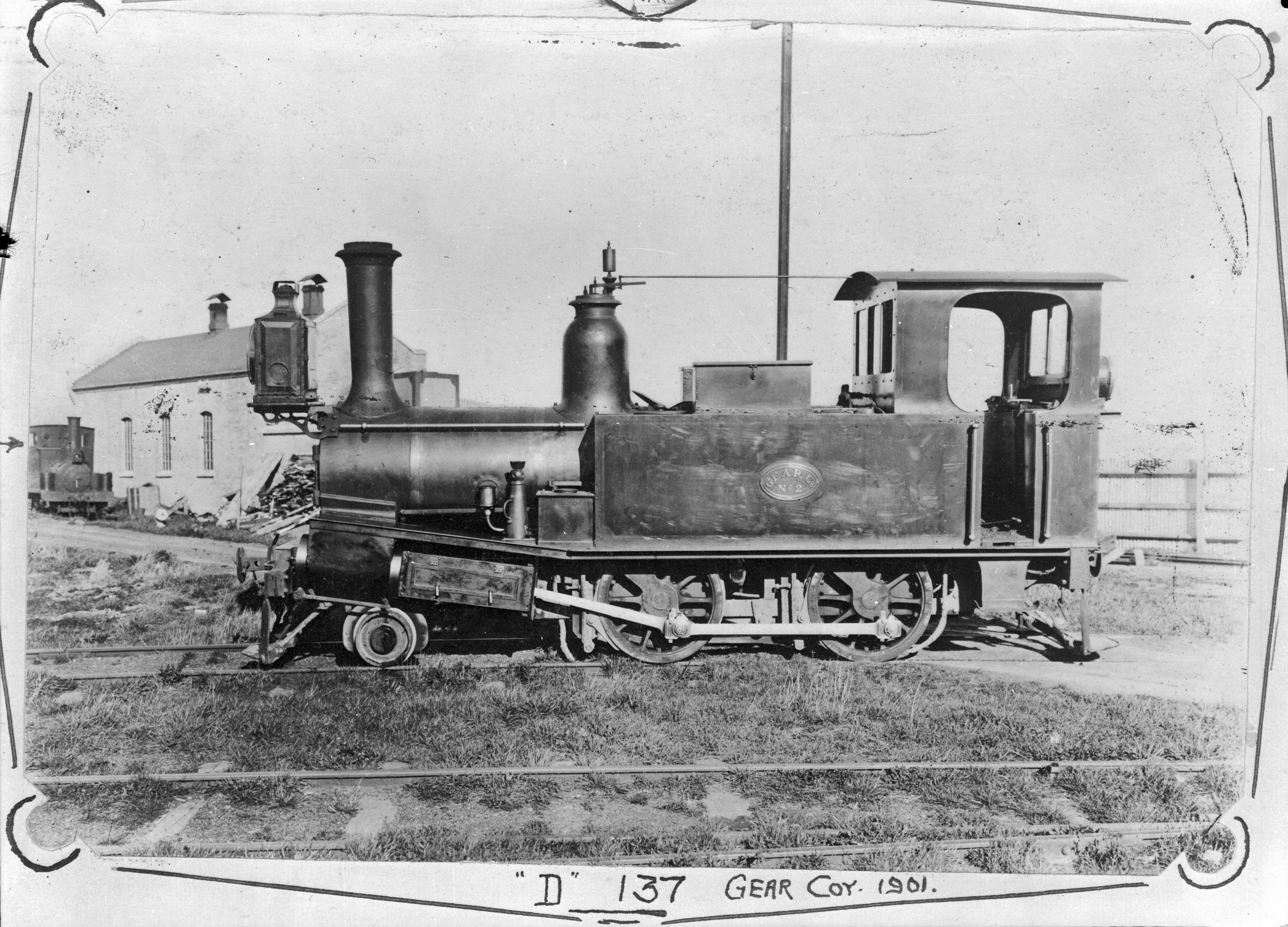
Gear Company locomotive No 2, industrially used 1901–1963 and later as NZR D 137. Preserved at Silver Stream Railway

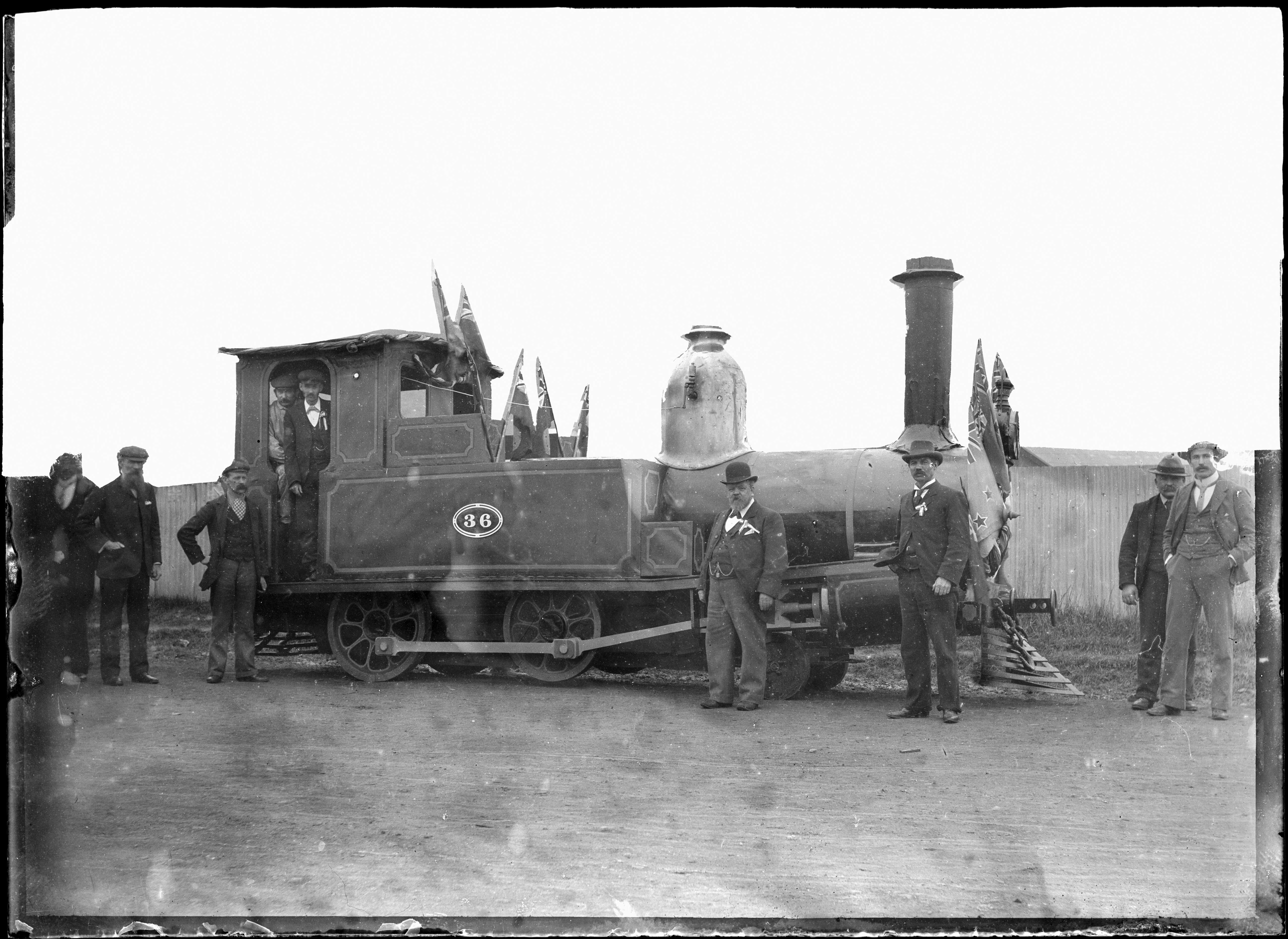
Works No 36 of 1887, which went into service in 1888 as NZR D 140. Industrial use 1920–1960. Preserved at Ferrymead Railway

Scott Brothers Limited was an engineering firm in Christchurch, New Zealand.

== Establishment ==
It was established in the early 1870s, when John Lee Scott and his brother George bought an existing foundry business on Durham Street, in Christchurch. In 1876, a one-acre lot was purchased at 65 Manchester St. in the centre of the city, and a new foundry built. This became known as the Atlas Works, named after the Atlas Engineering Works in Derby, England where John Lee and George Scott had served part of their apprenticeships as patternmakers and engineers. They were soon joined by two more brothers, Moses, an engineer and draughtsman and William, a moulder. Additional land was acquired, expanding the new foundry site to three acres.

== Early manufacturing ==
A wide variety of machinery and equipment was manufactured, which variously utilised water-power, steam, coal, gas manufactured from coal, and electricity as their sources of power or heat. At first, products were manufactured for railways, saw-milling and agriculture industries; ranging from steam engines, boilers, windmills to cast-iron cookstoves. Some of the engineering projects completed were steel railway bridges, the Port Chalmers dock, structural steel for the High Street Post Office and the King Edward Barracks. The company designed and built equipment to extract gas from coal, and producer gas units were fabricated from castings made in the firm's foundry. The company manufactured electrical generating equipment, which was installed at the 1906 International Exhibition in Hagley Park, after which the equipment was sold and set up in Timaru, becoming that city's first electrical supply system.

== Locomotive manufacturing ==
In 1882 the company supplied ten D class locomotives to the New Zealand Government Railways. They are the only New Zealand manufacturer apart from A&G Price of Thames to have supplied the NZR with steam locomotives, and they manufactured viaducts for the North Island Main Trunk and Midland railway line. Some of the largest bridges in the country were also built by Scott Brothers. These included the Teremakau, the Taumaranui, the steel railway bridge at Staircase Gully and the Awatere road and rail bridge at Seddon.

Kaiapoi Woollen Mills increased its power plant with a Corliss steam engine of 650 horsepower manufactured by Scott Brothers. The Woolston Tannery, Lyttelton Times Printing Office, part of the Addington Workshops, and the electric light installation of the Lyttelton Harbour Board were all powered by engines built by Scott Brothers.

== World War II ==
During World War II, the company accepted and completed orders for several million hand grenades, half a million 2-inch mortar-bomb pressings, fifty thousand ammunition boxes, and enamel mugs for the army. Some of the necessary machinery, including lathes for machining the grenades, was built by the Company, as much of this equipment was unprocurable overseas or elsewhere in New Zealand.

== Cookstoves and ovens ==
Domestic and commercial grade cookstoves and ovens gradually became the mainstay of Scott Brothers Limited. In 1878 the first coal-burning cast-iron ranges were produced. In 1931 the company introduced its new Atlas Electric Ranges. These gradually changed from cast-iron to pressed steel, and in 1961 a large, 75 KW porcelain-enamelling furnace was installed. In 1962 the foundry itself was closed and the company concentrated on the production of electric ranges. In conjunction with the manufacture of electric ranges, porcelain enamelled baths, kitchen sinks, enamelled street signs were also produced.

== Merger with Charles Begg ==
In 1966 Scott Brothers Limited merged with Charles Begg and Company Limited but retained its individual status. In 1970 after being run by three generations of the Scott family, the company celebrated its centenary. However the merger with Charles Begg saw the beginning of incorporation in larger companies, and Scott Brothers company disappeared in an ensuing progression of changing names. The Atlas electric cookstove is still being produced under a new logo and new corporate identity.

Both John Lee and George Scott were also active on the public stage. John Lee served on the Sydenham Borough Council, represented the South East Ward in the Christchurch City Council, was president of the Industrial Association of Canterbury, a member of the Board of Governors of Canterbury College, and served on school committees. He lectured at Canterbury College School of Engineering and also on the theory of music. In 1894 he was appointed one of the Railway Commissioners. George Scott was a member of the City Council and became chairman of the Heathcote County Council, he was also chairman of the Technical College Board of Governors.

== Locomotive class supplied ==
- D (11)
