= Mathematical tile =

Building material in southeast England

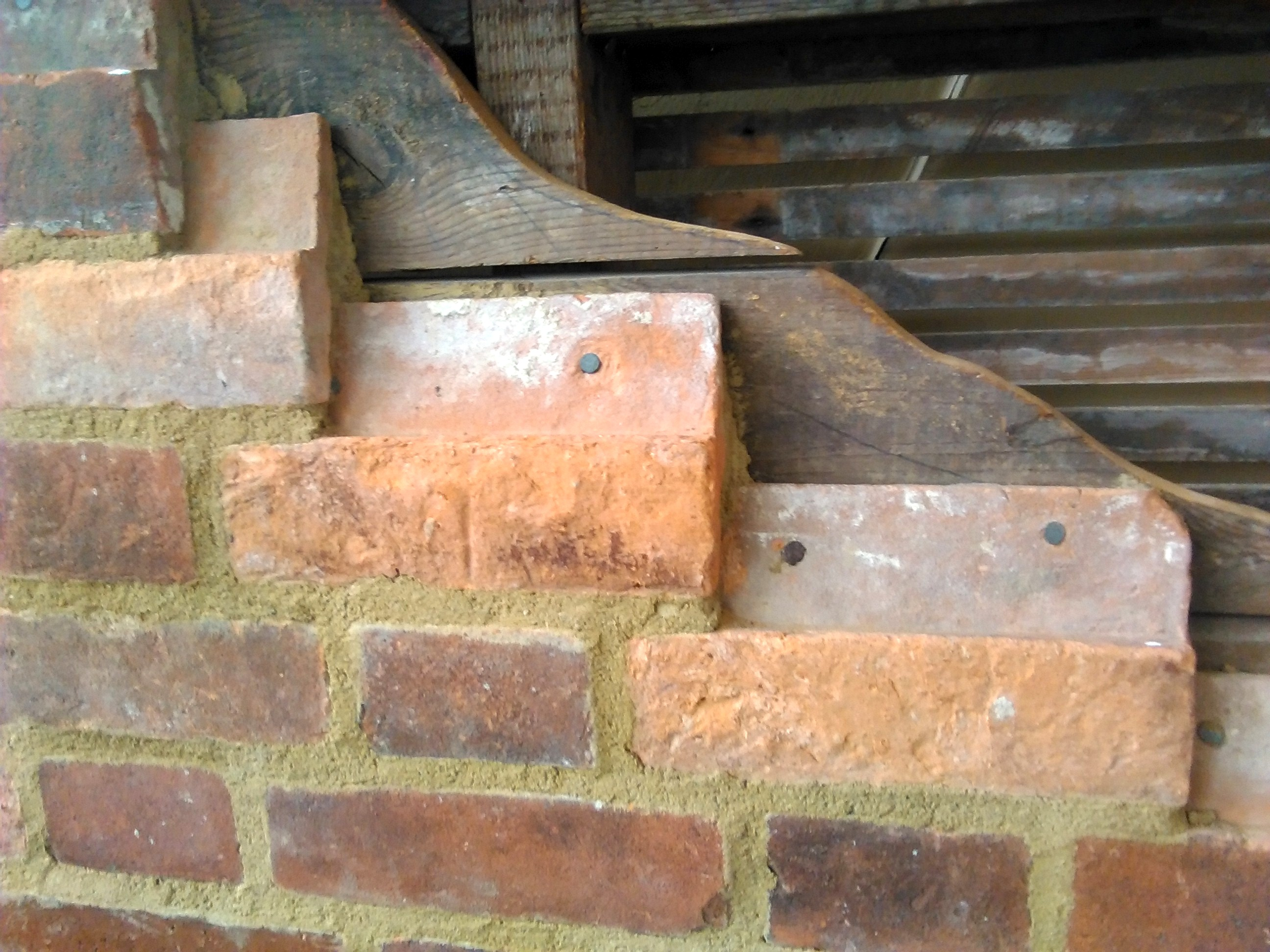
Mathematical tiles nailed to wooden planks, overlapped and mortared to give the appearance of a brick surface

Mathematical tiles are tiles which were used extensively as a building material in the southeastern counties of England—especially East Sussex and Kent—in the 18th and early 19th centuries. They were laid on the exterior of timber-framed buildings as an alternative to brickwork, which their appearance closely resembled.

A distinctive black variety with a glazed surface was used on many buildings in Brighton (now part of the city of Brighton and Hove) from about 1760 onwards, and is considered a characteristic feature of the town's early architecture. Although the brick tax (1784–1850) was formerly thought to have encouraged the use of mathematical tiles, in fact the tiles were subject to the same tax.

== Name ==
The precise origin of the name "mathematical" is unknown. Local historian Norman Nail ascribes it to the "neat geometric pattern" produced by the tiles. John W. Cowan suggests it means "exactly regular", an older sense of "mathematical" which is now rare. Other attributive names include "brick", "geometrical", "mechanical", "rebate", "wall", or "weather" tiles. According to Christopher Hussey, "weather tile" is an earlier more general term, with the true "mathematical tile" distinguished by its flush setting. In 18th-century Oxford "feather edge tile" was used. While "mathematical tile" is now usual, Nail considered it a "pretentious" innovation, preferring "brick tile" as an older and more authentic name.

== Usage and varieties ==
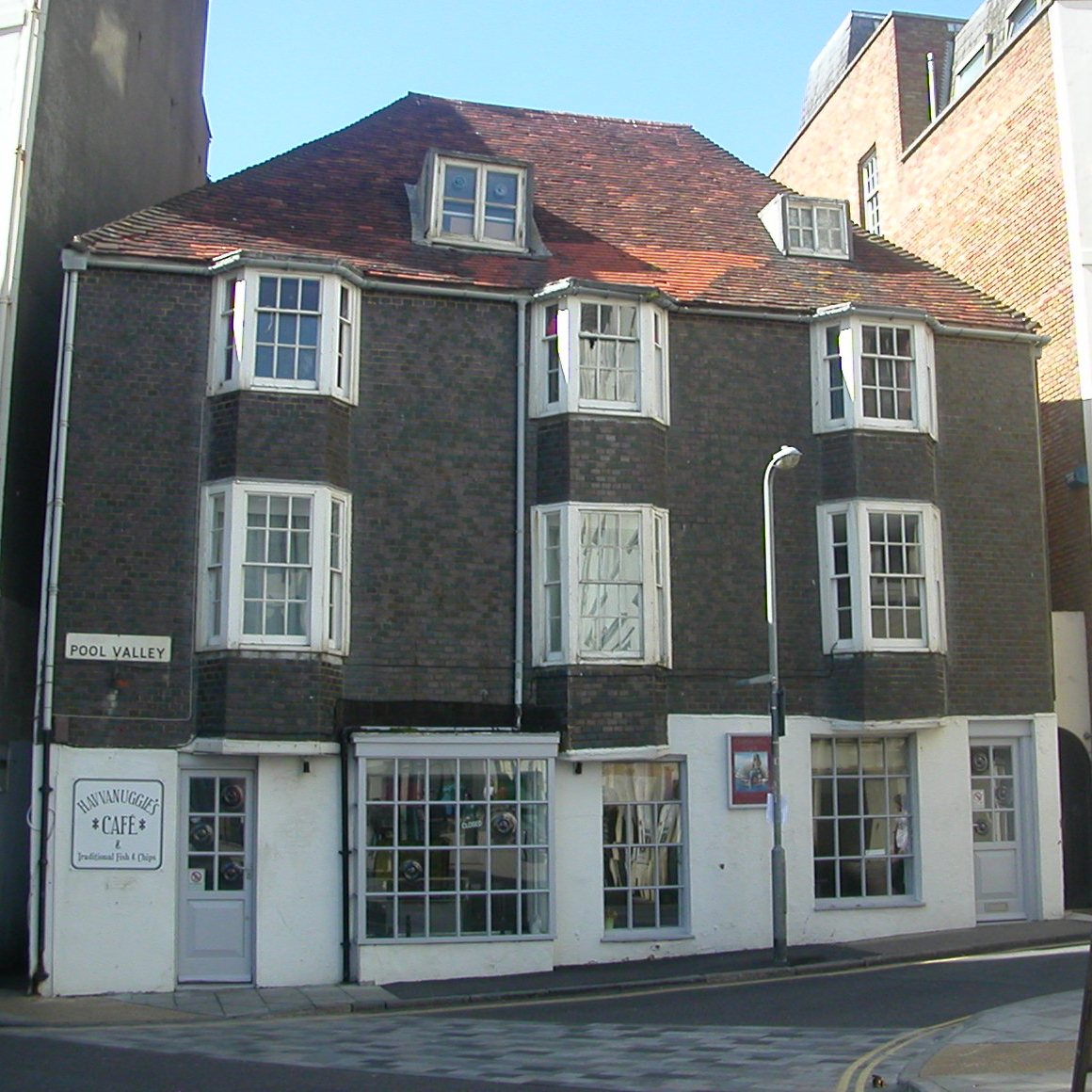
9 Pool Valley, Brighton has a black tile façade of 1794.

The tiles were laid in a partly overlapping pattern, akin to roof shingles. Their lower section—the part intended to be visible when the tiling was complete—was thicker; the upper section would slide under the overlapping tile above and would therefore be hidden. In the top corner was a hole for a nail to be inserted. They would then be hung on a lath of wood, and the lower sections would be moulded together with an infill of lime mortar to form a flat surface.

The interlocking visible surfaces would then resemble either header bond or stretcher bond brickwork. Mathematical tiles had several advantages over brick: they were cheaper, easier to lay than bricks (skilled workmen were not needed), and were more resistant to the weathering effects of wind, rain and sea-spray, making them particularly useful at seaside locations such as Brighton.

Various colours of tile were produced: red, to resemble brick most closely; honey; cream; and black. Brighton, the resort most closely associated with mathematical tiles, has examples of each. Many houses on the seafront east of the Royal Pavilion and Old Steine, for example on Wentworth Street, have cream-coloured tiles, and honey-coloured tiles were used by Henry Holland in his design for the Marine Pavilion—forerunner of the Royal Pavilion. Holland often used mathematical tiles in his commissions, although he usually used blue Gault clay to make them.

A 1987 count of surviving mathematical tiles in English counties found the most in Kent (407 buildings), followed by Sussex (382), Wiltshire (50), Surrey (47), and Hampshire (37 including the Isle of Wight).

== Black glazed tiles ==
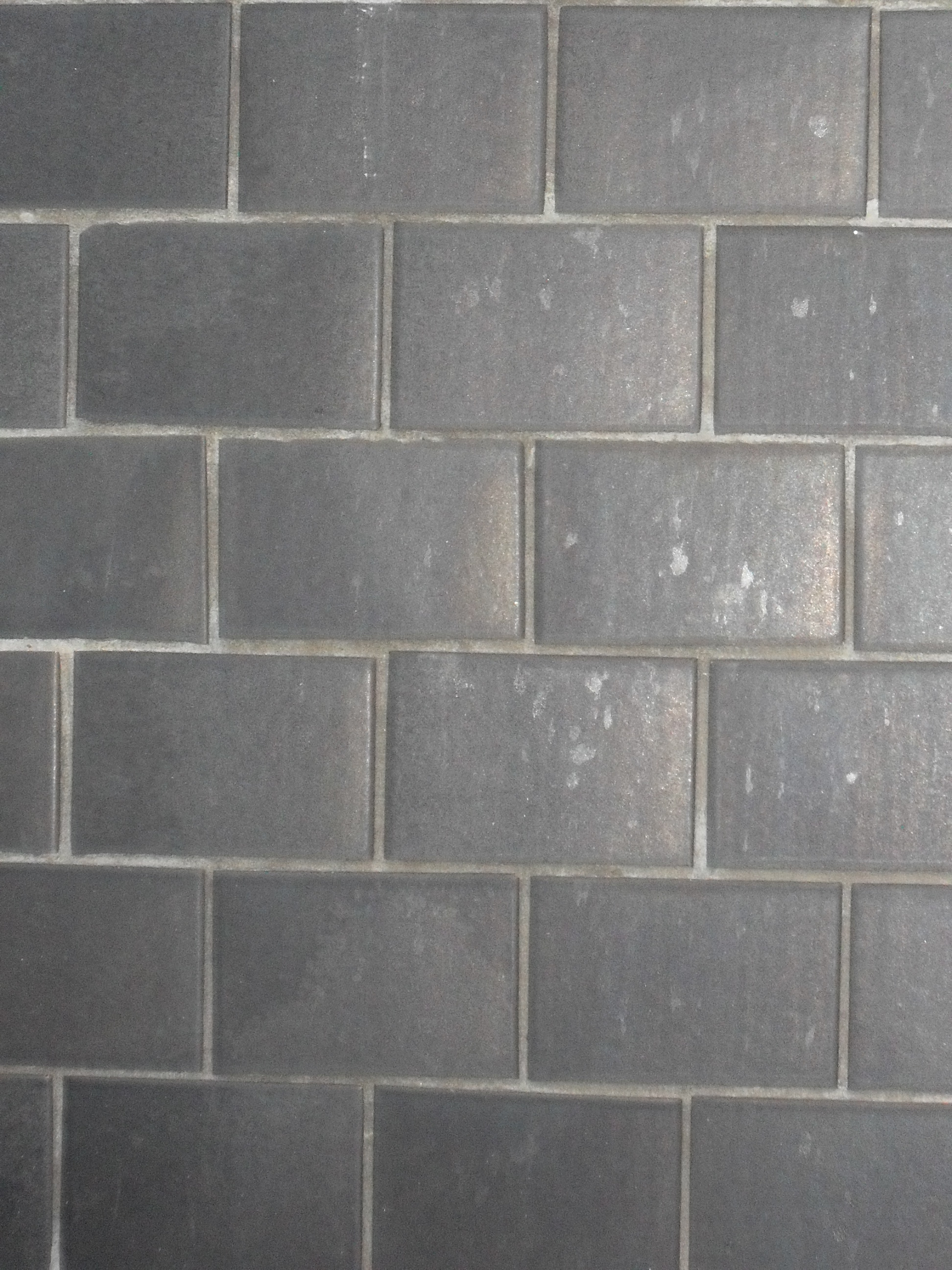
Black glazed mathematical tiles—as seen here at 44 Old Steine—are a characteristic feature of Brighton's 18th-century architecture.

The black glazed type is most closely associated with Brighton's early architecture, such tiles had the extra advantage of reflecting light in a visually attractive way. Black mathematical tiles started to appear in the 1760s, soon after the town began to grow in earnest as its reputation as a health resort became known.

When Patcham Place, a mid 16th-century house in nearby Patcham (now part of the city of Brighton and Hove), was rebuilt in 1764, it was clad entirely in the tiles. Royal Crescent, Brighton's first unified architectural set piece and first residential development built to face the sea, was faced in the same material when it was built between 1799 and 1807.

When Pool Valley—the site where a winterbourne drained into the English Channel—was built over in the 1790s, one of the first buildings erected there was a mathematical tiled two-storey shop. Both the building (now known as 9 Pool Valley) and the façade survive. All three of these have Grade II* listed status, indicating that in the context of England's architecture they are "particularly important ... [and] of more than special interest".

Other examples can be seen at Grand Parade—the east side of Old Steine, developed haphazardly with large houses in a variety of styles and materials in the early 19th century; York Place, a fashionable address when built in the 1800s; and Market Street in The Lanes, Brighton's ancient core of narrow streets.

Lewes, the county town of East Sussex, has many buildings clad with mathematical tiles in black and other colours. These include the Grade I-listed Jireh Chapel in the Cliffe area of the town which is clad in red mathematical tiles and dark grey slate. The timber-framed chapel was built in 1805.

Elsewhere, a study in 2005 identified 22 18th-century timber-framed buildings (mostly townhouses) with mathematical tiles of various colours. Examples are the semi-detached pair at 199 and 200 High Street, the small terrace at 9–11 Market Street, 33 School Hill (an old building with a mid-18th century renewed façade), and the Quaker meeting house of 1784.

== Examples from Brighton ==
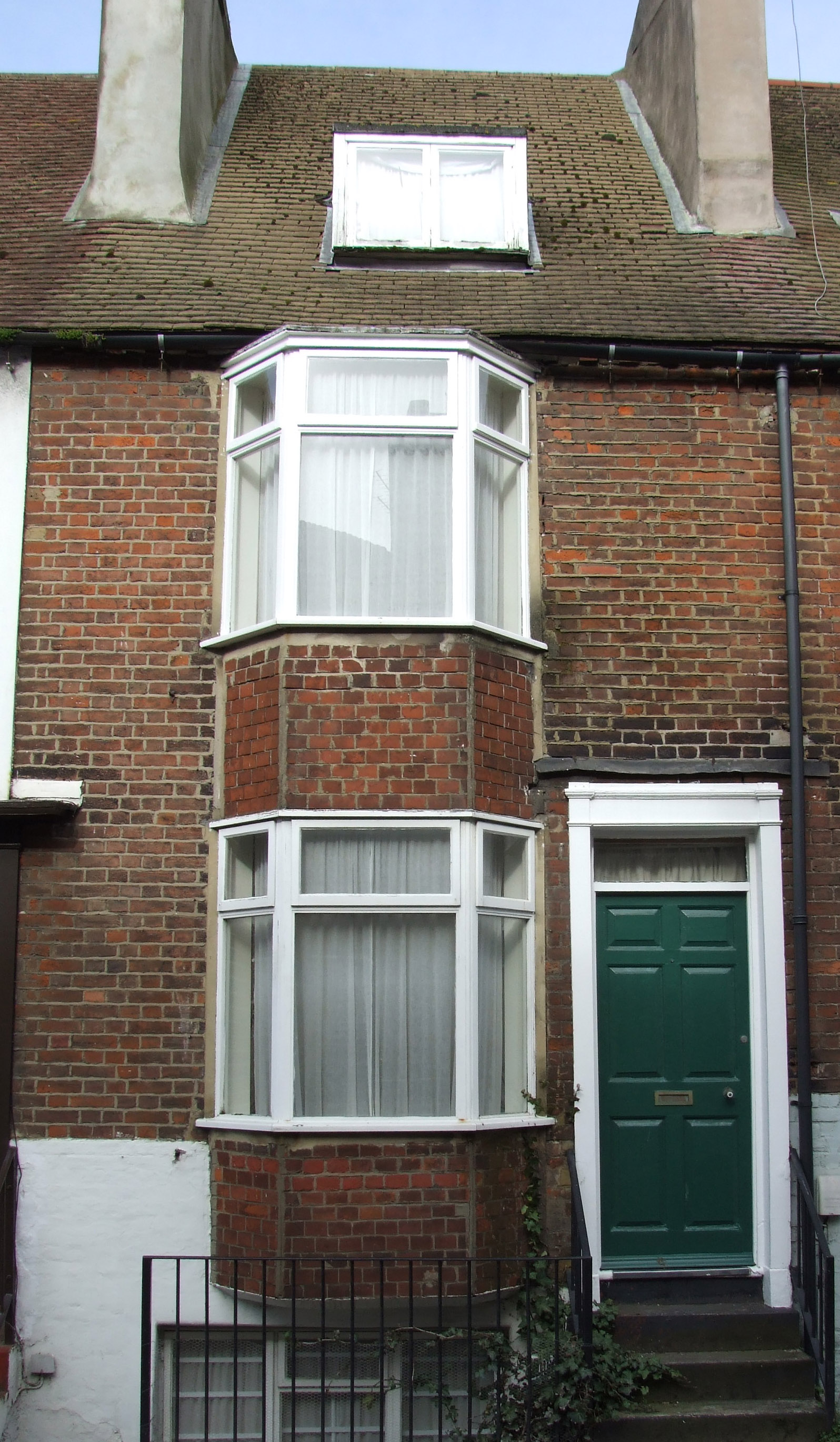
Brick coloured mathematical tiles on a bay window in George Street

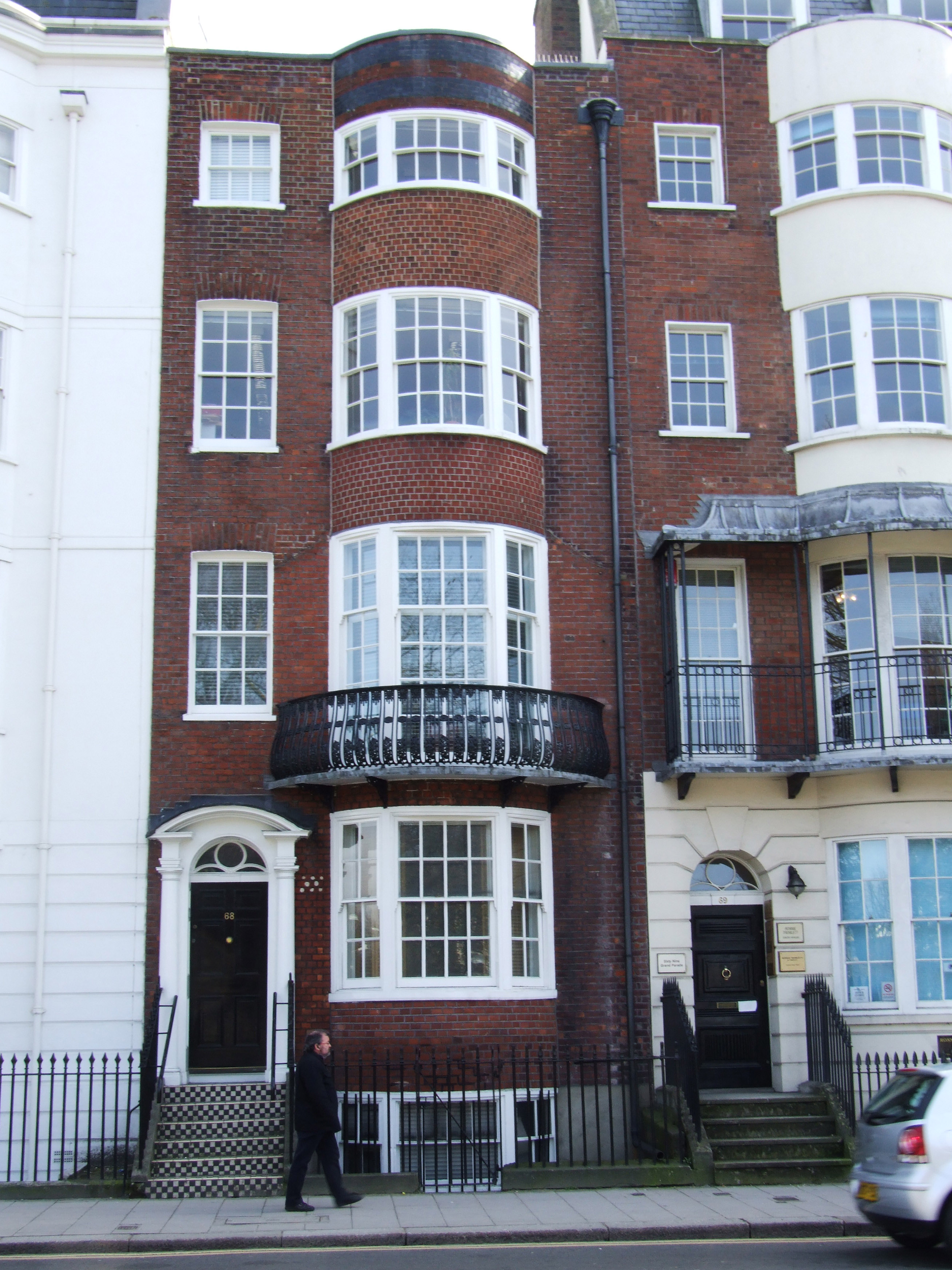
Terracotta coloured mathematical tiles on a bay window in Grand Parade

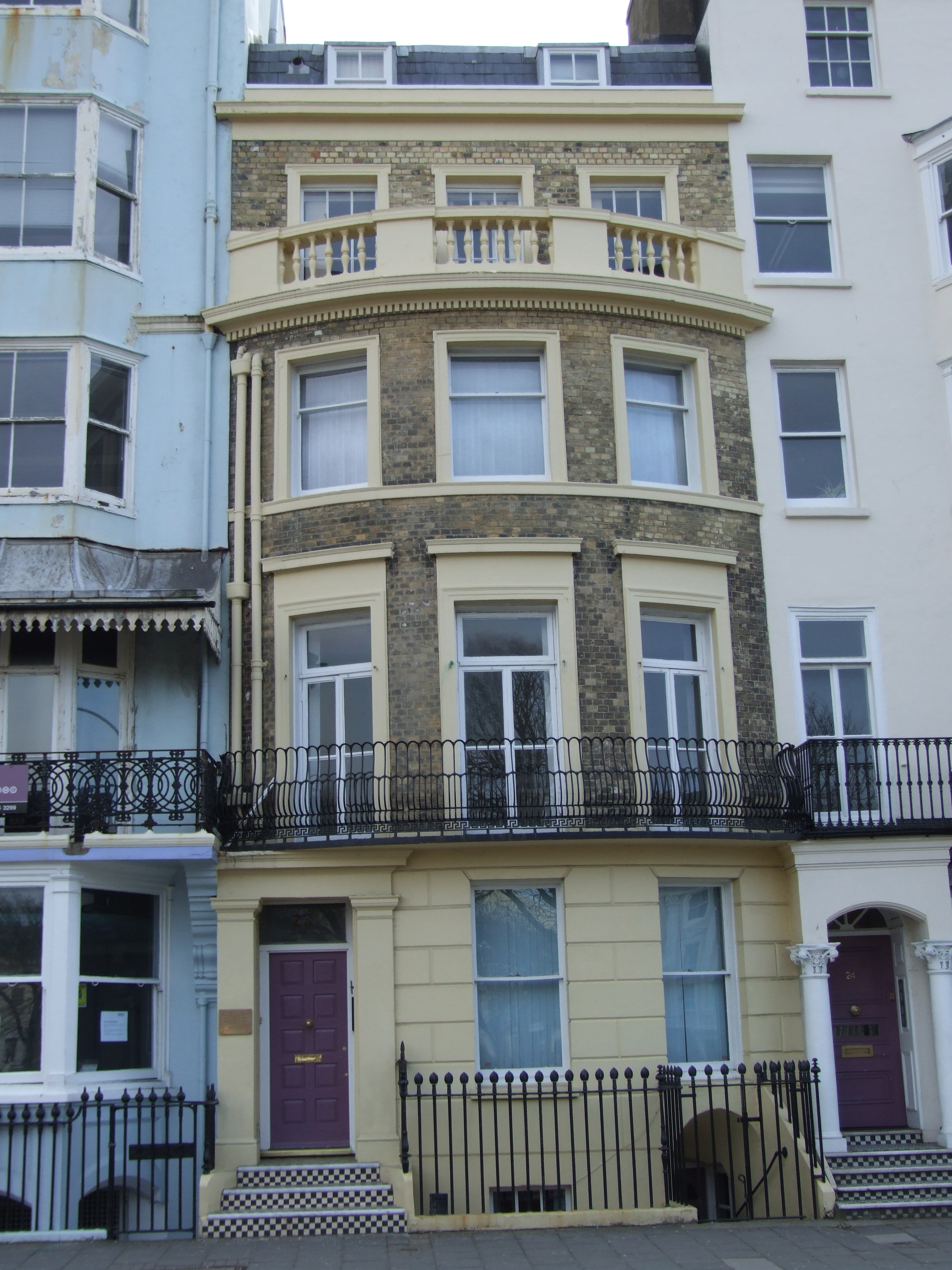
Cream coloured mathematical tiles on a building in Old Steine

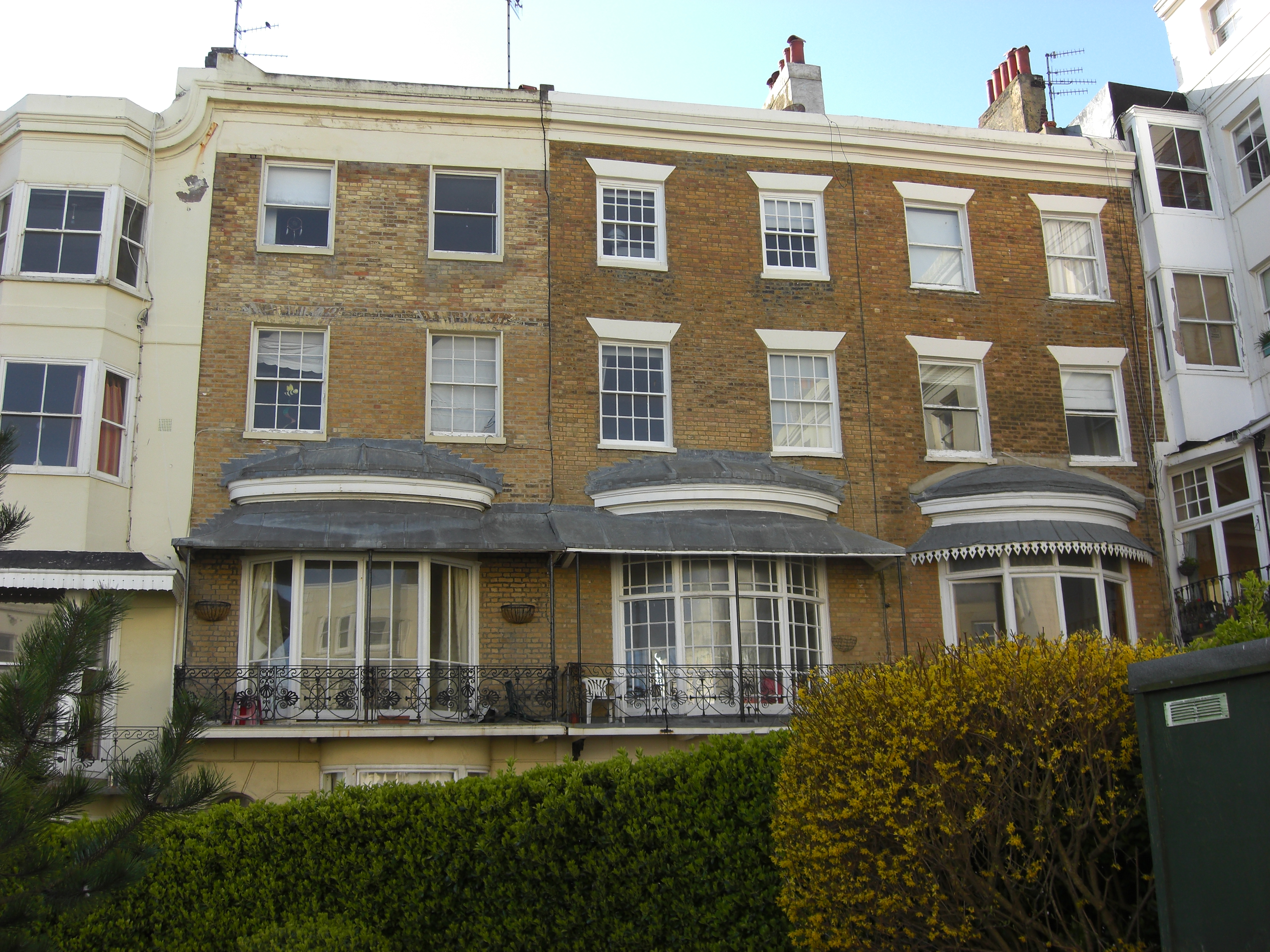
Cream coloured mathematical tiles on houses in Marine Square

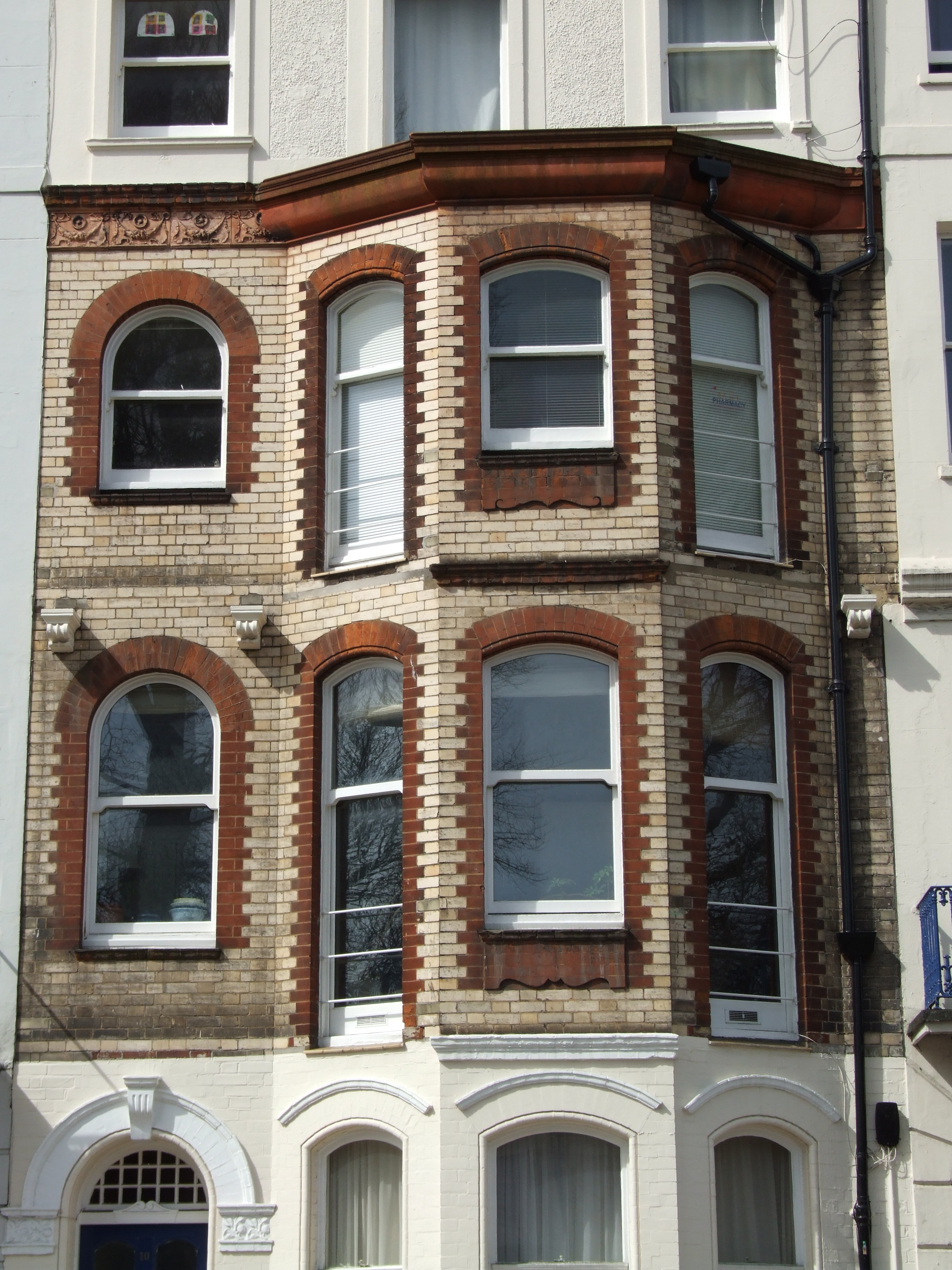
White and terracotta coloured mathematical tiles on Grand Parade

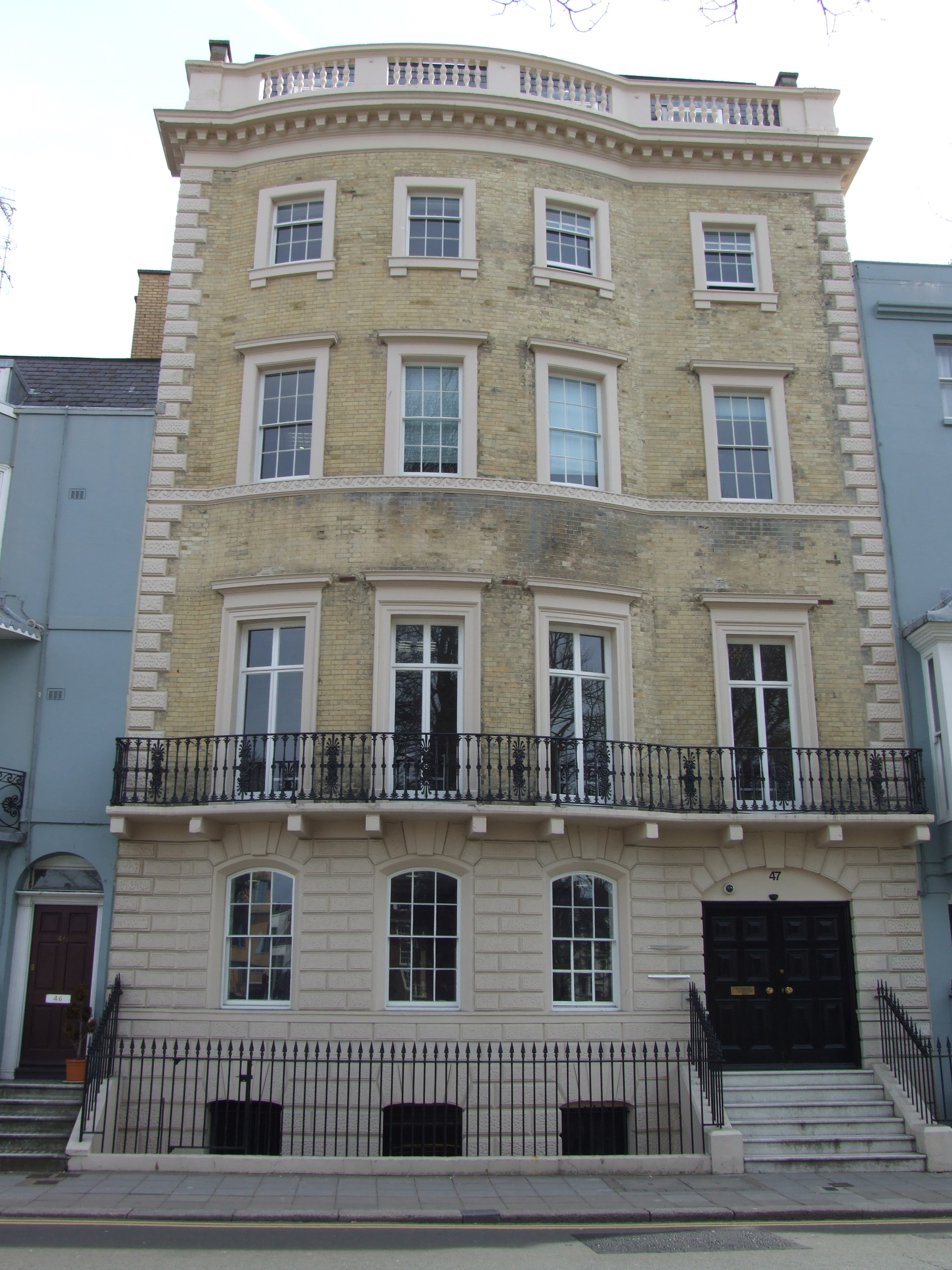
Cream coloured mathematical tiles on an Amon Wilds house at 47 Grand Parade

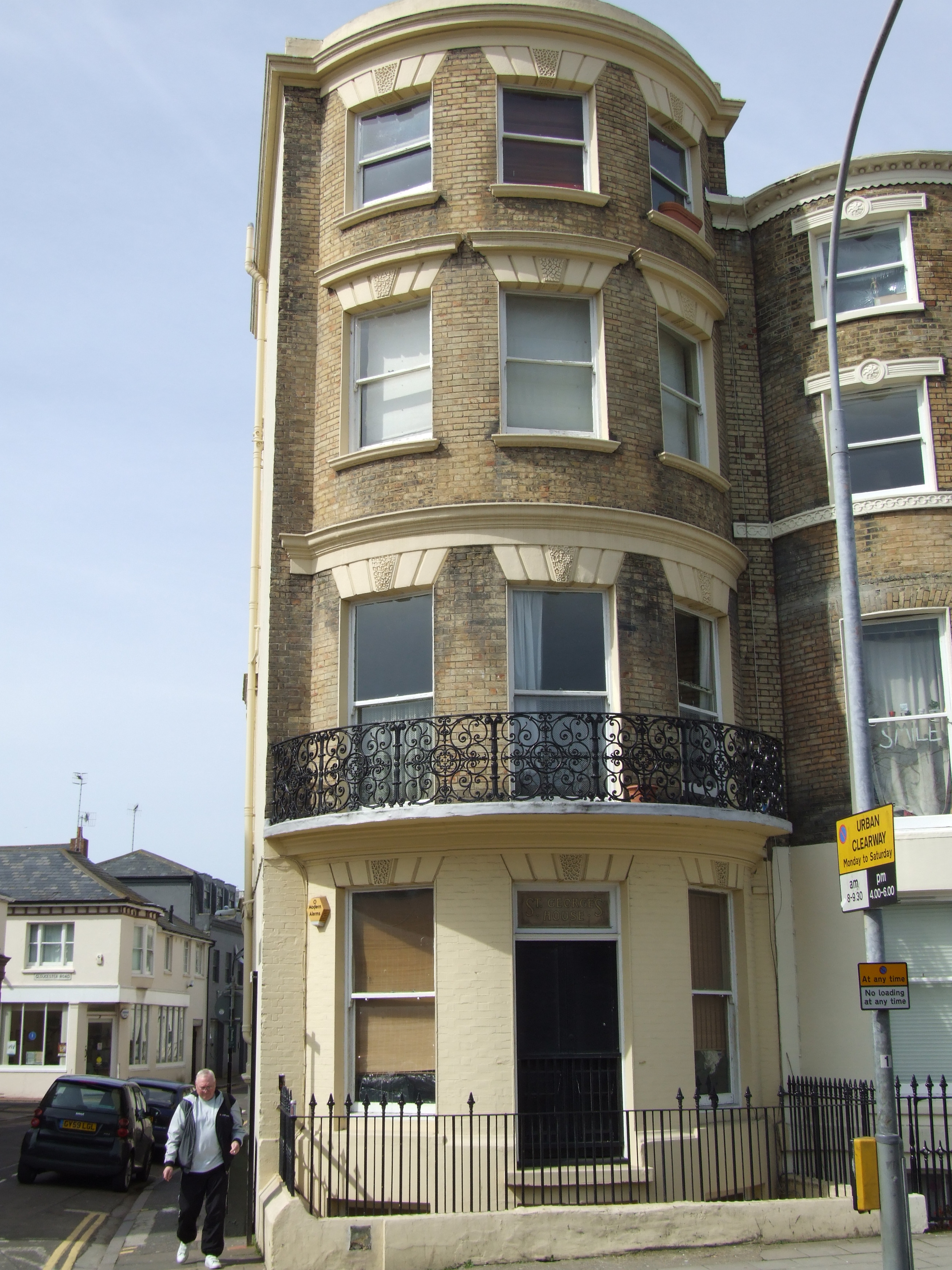
Cream coloured mathematical tiles on an Amon Wilds house on St George's Place

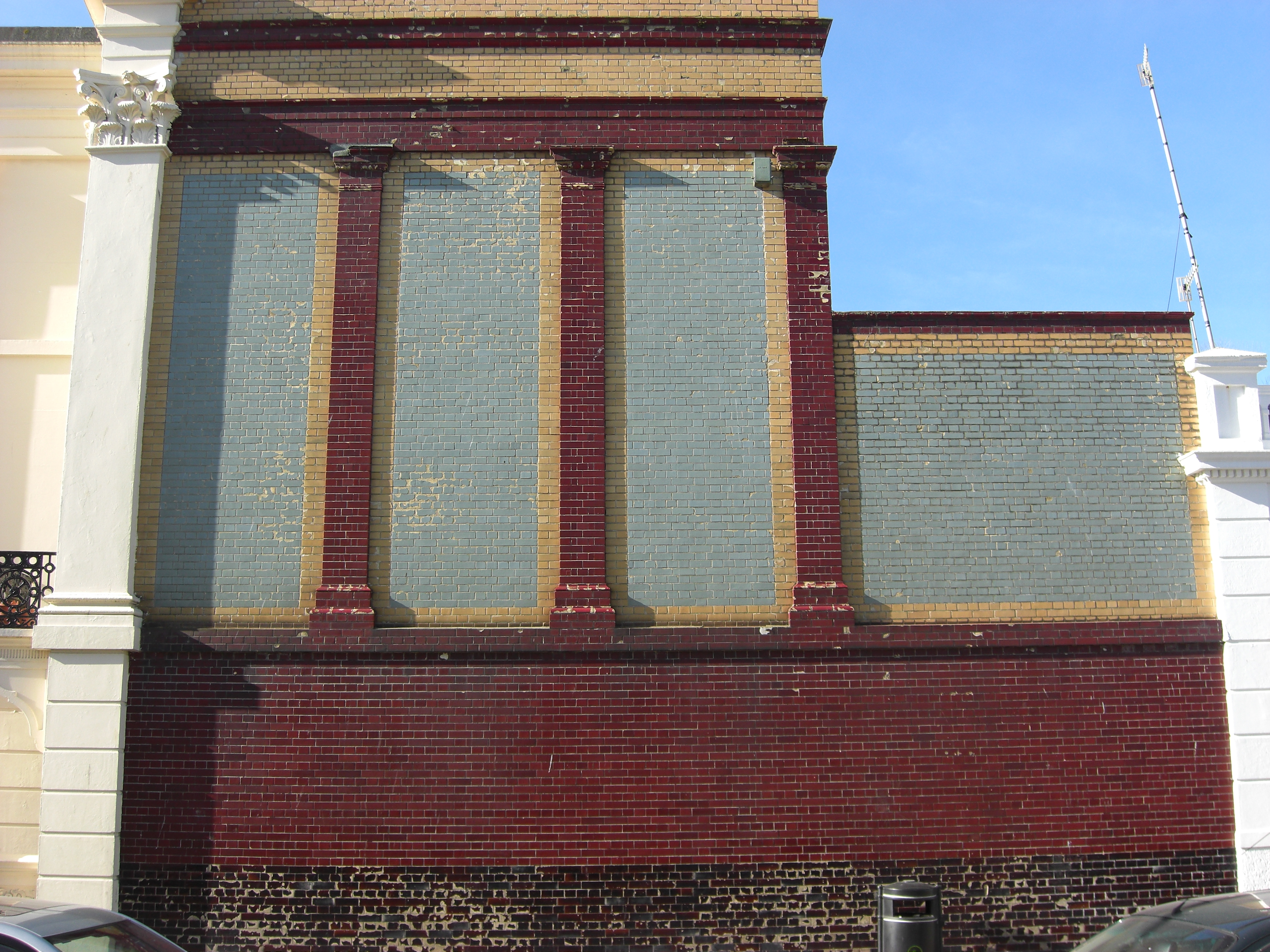
Rare example of blue, cream, maroon and dark maroon mathematical tiles at the end of the terrace on the west of Portland Place

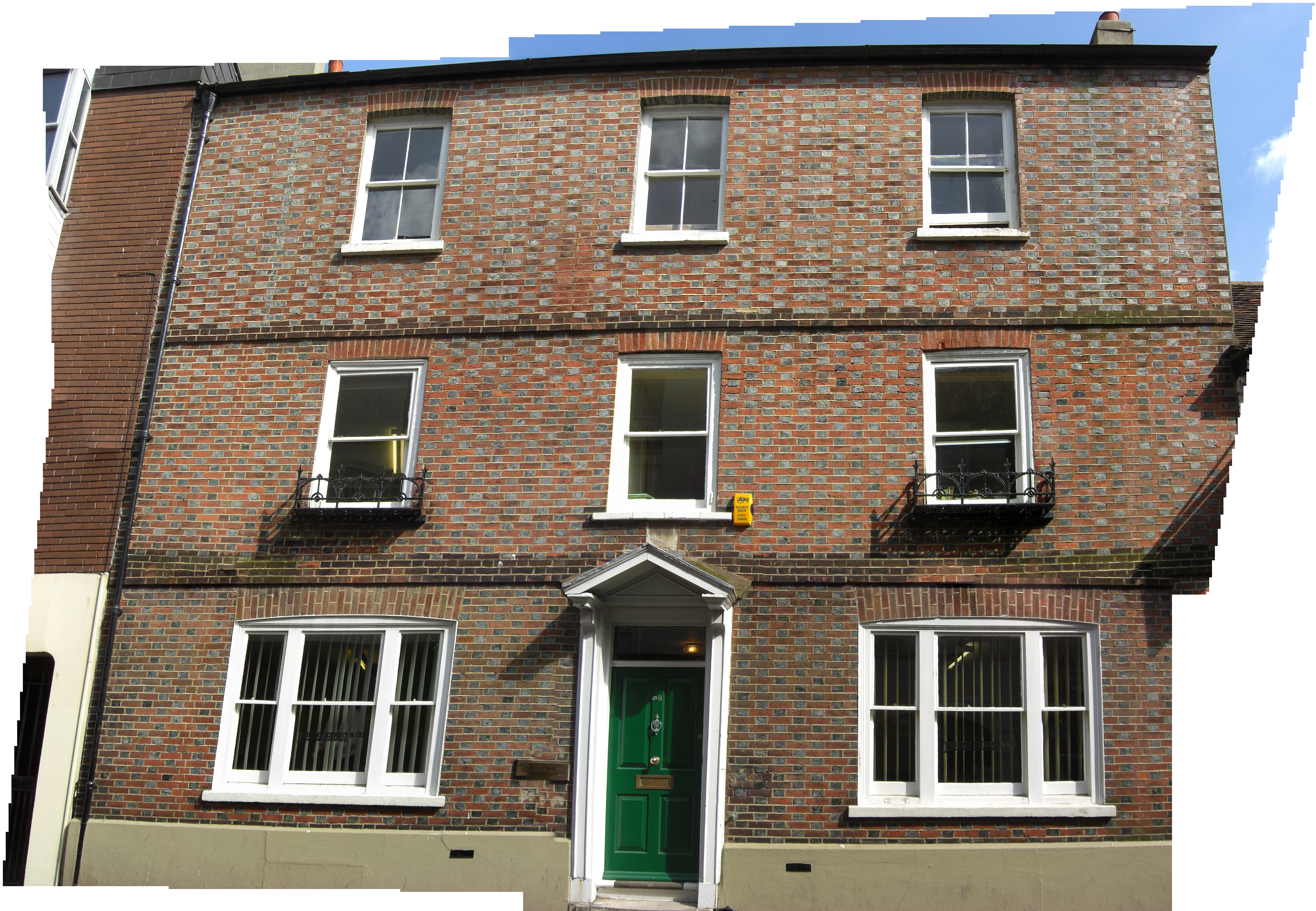
Brick and flint effect mathematical tiles on a building in Ship Street

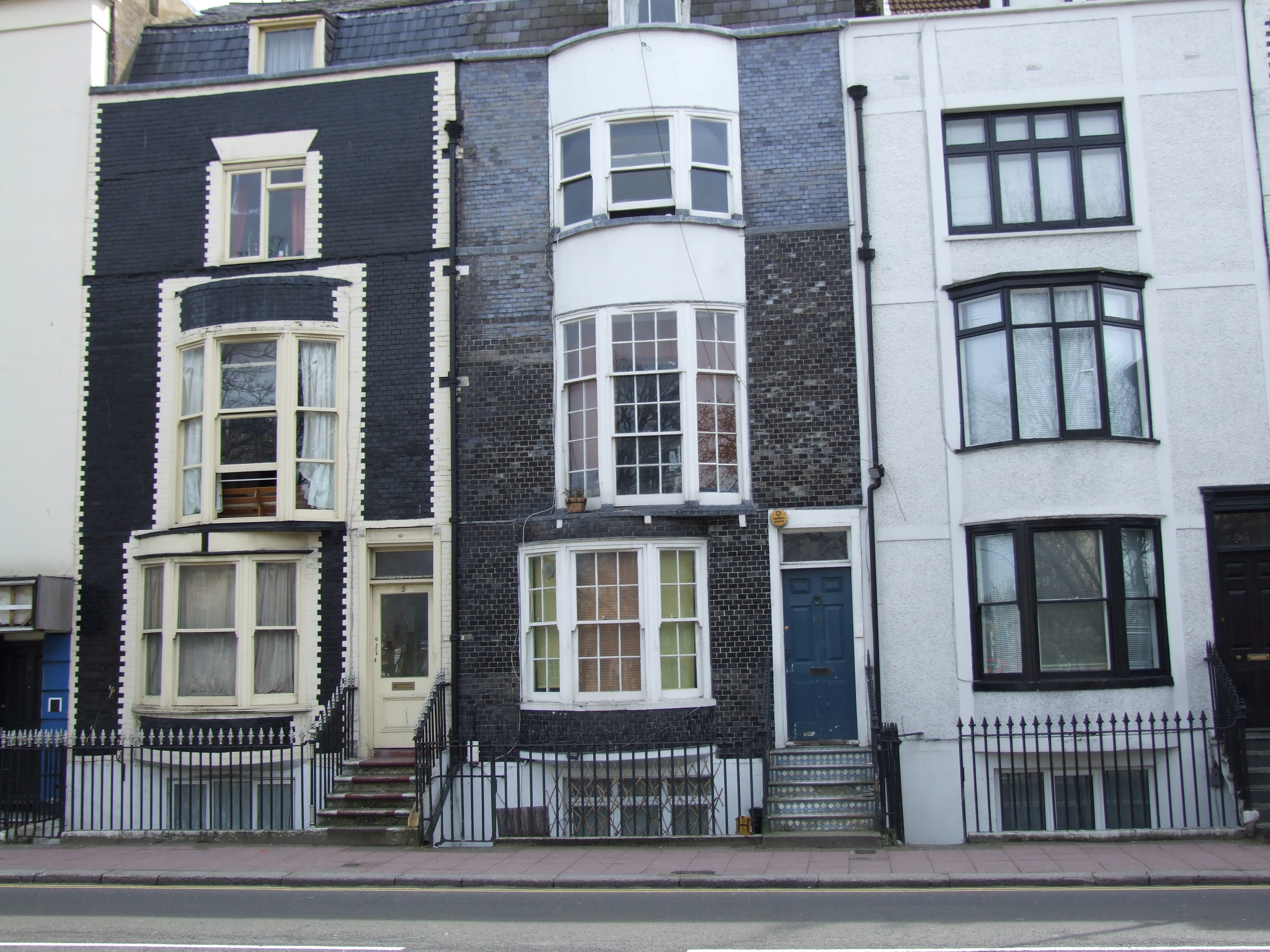
Black mathematical tiles on houses with unusual offset bay windows on Grand Parade

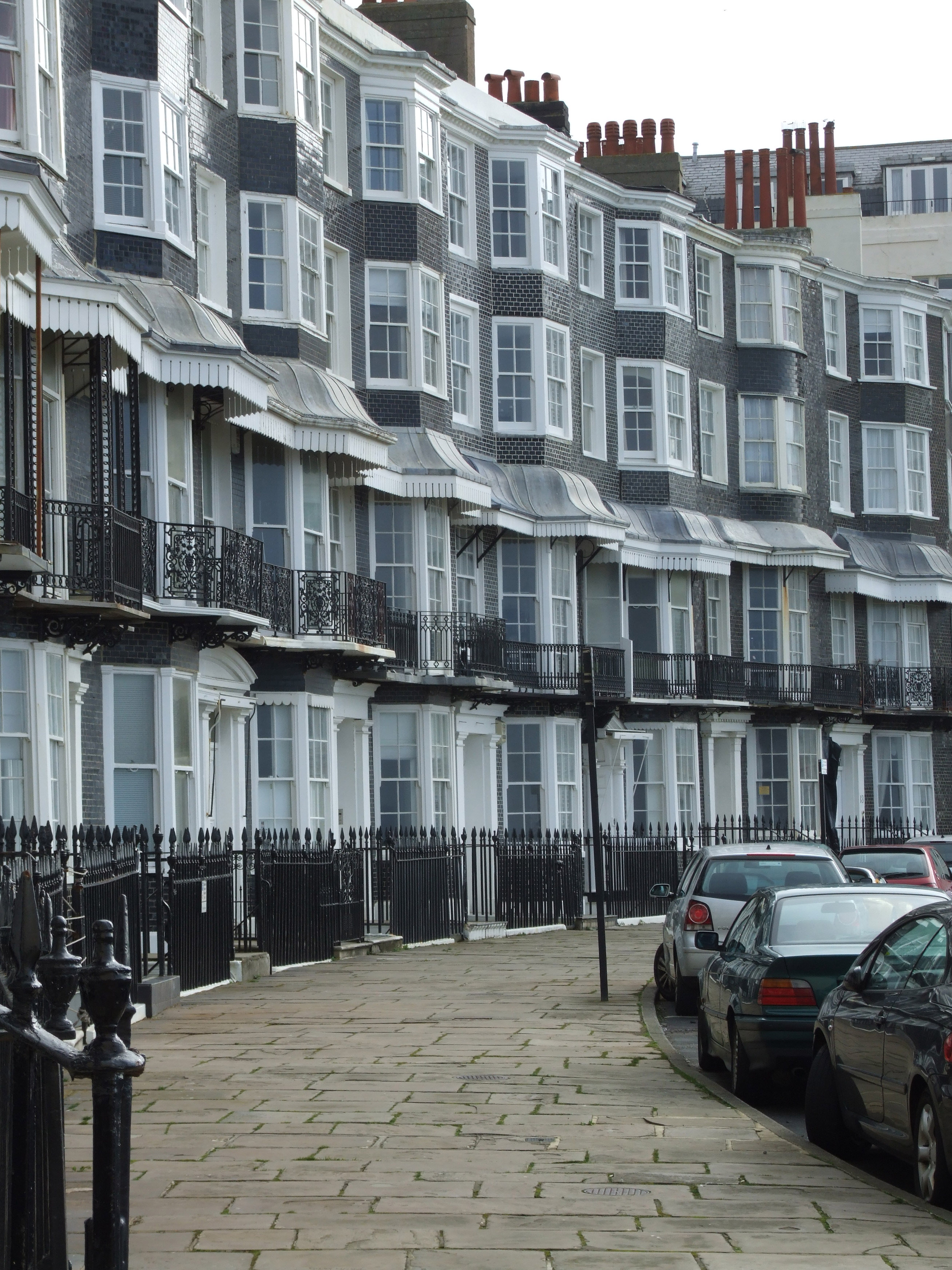
Houses on Royal Crescent, Brighton are entirely faced with black mathematical tiles

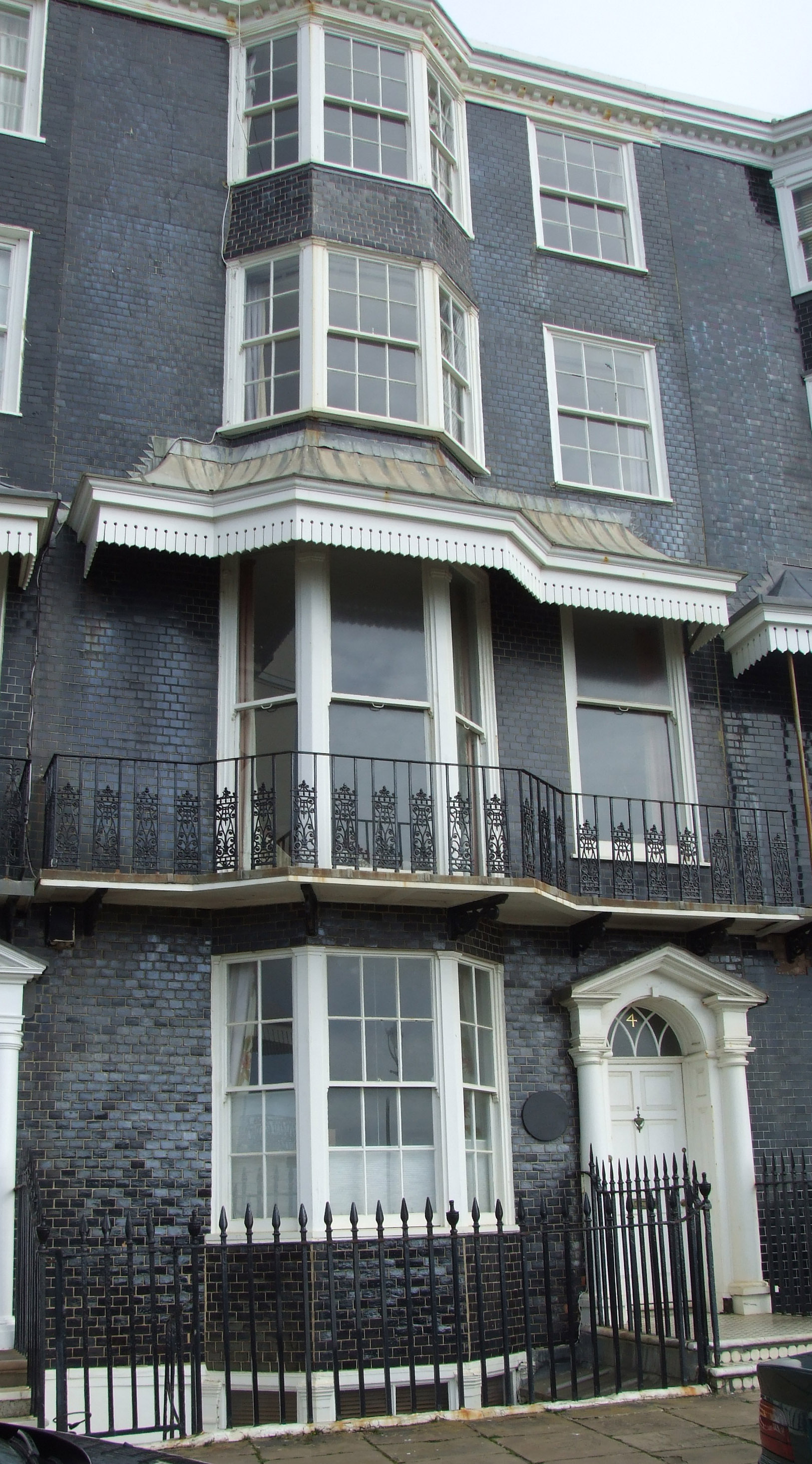
Laurence Olivier's former house on Royal Crescent, Brighton with mathematical tiles

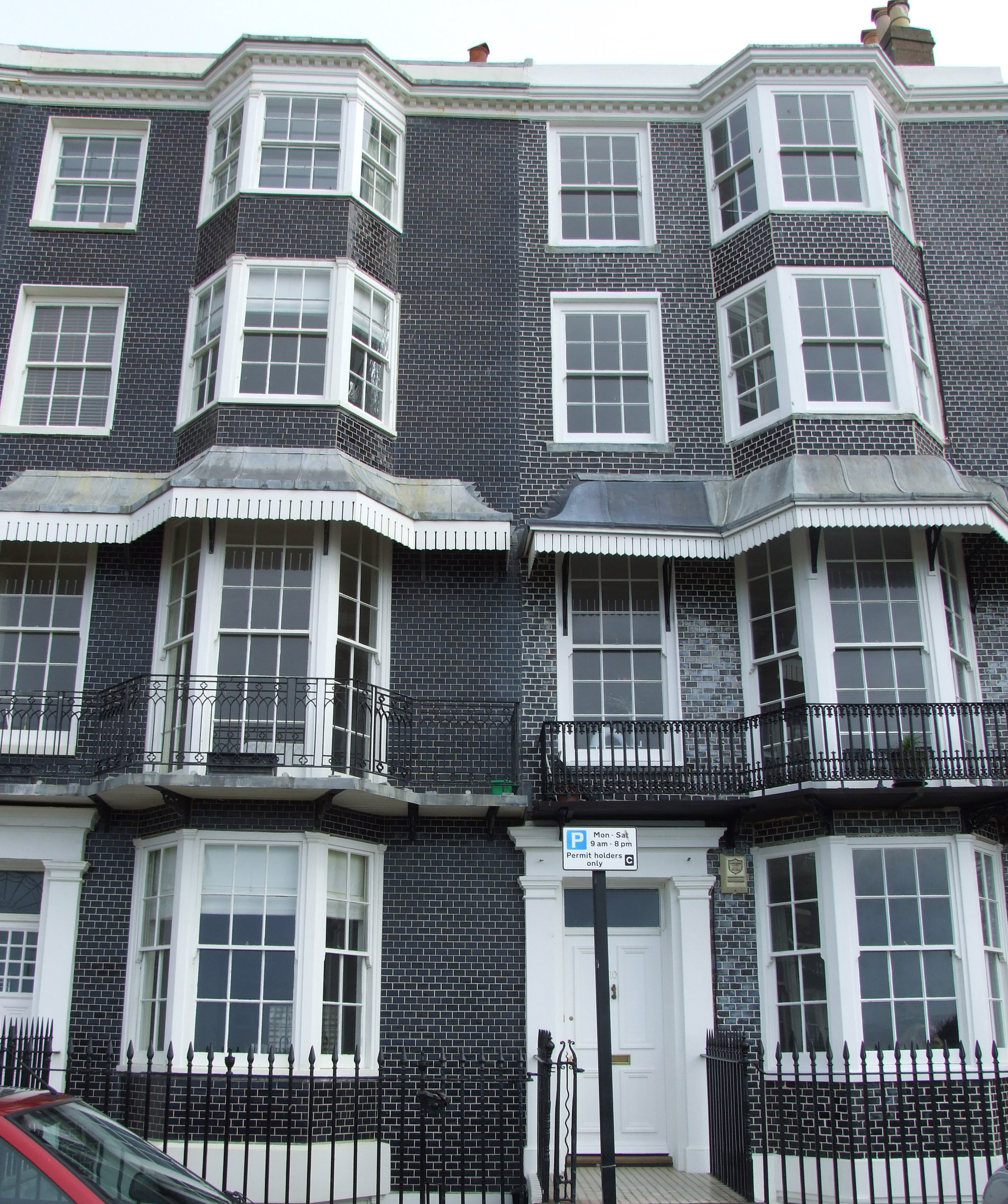
Two styles of black mathematical tiles on Royal Crescent, Brighton

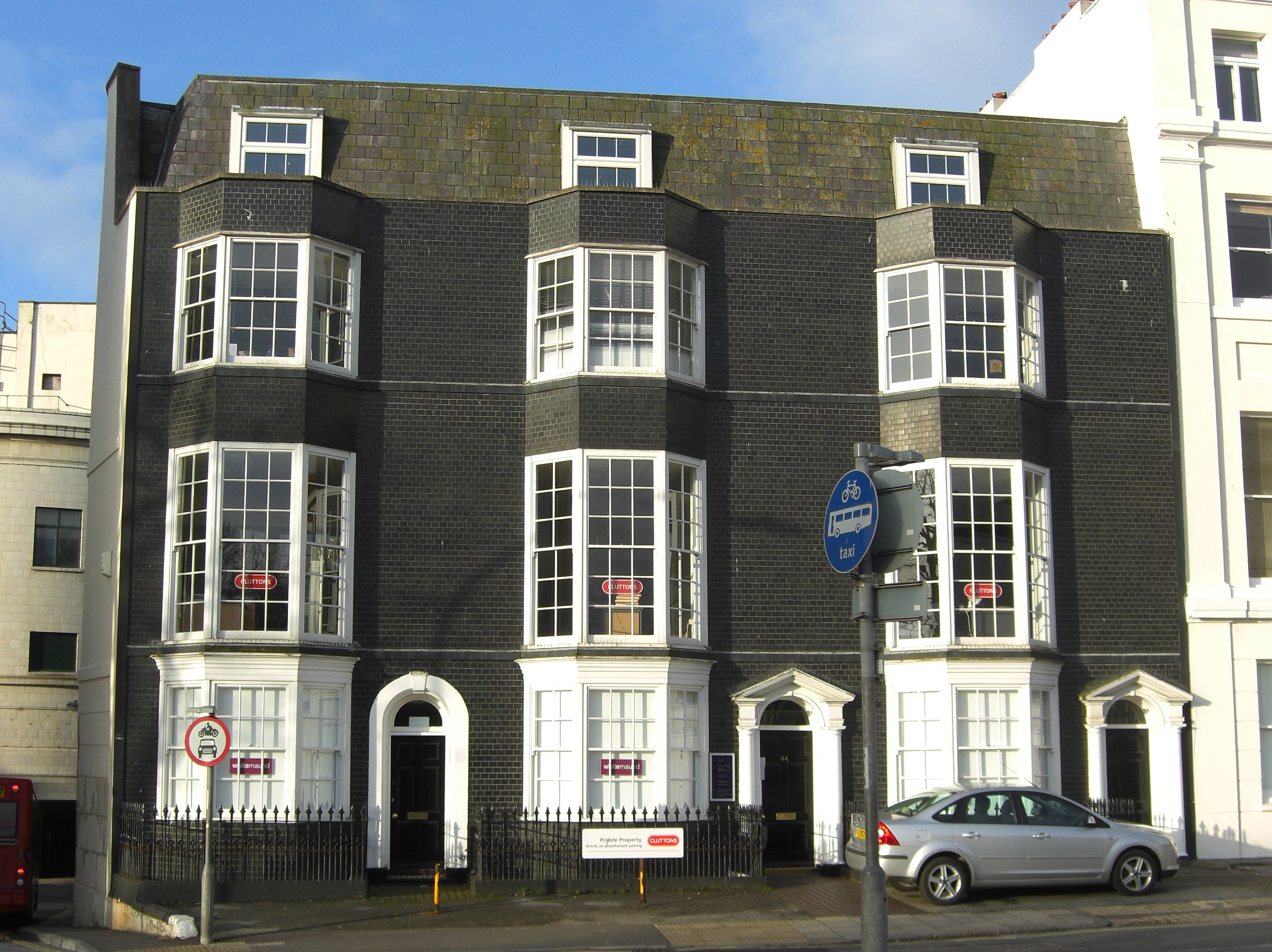
44 Old Steine

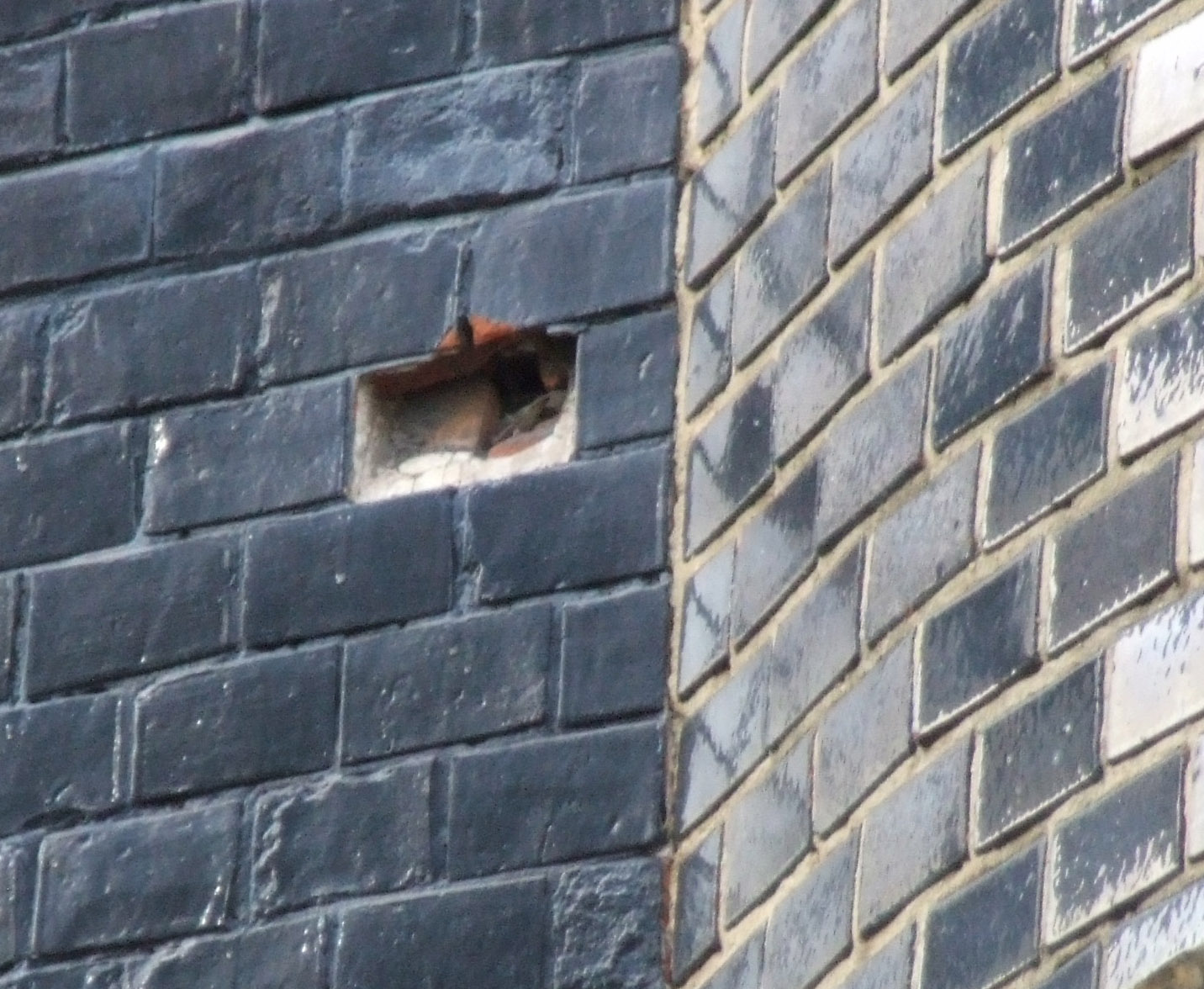
Missing mathematical tile on St James's Street, showing the flange of its lower left neighbour used to attach it to the woodwork

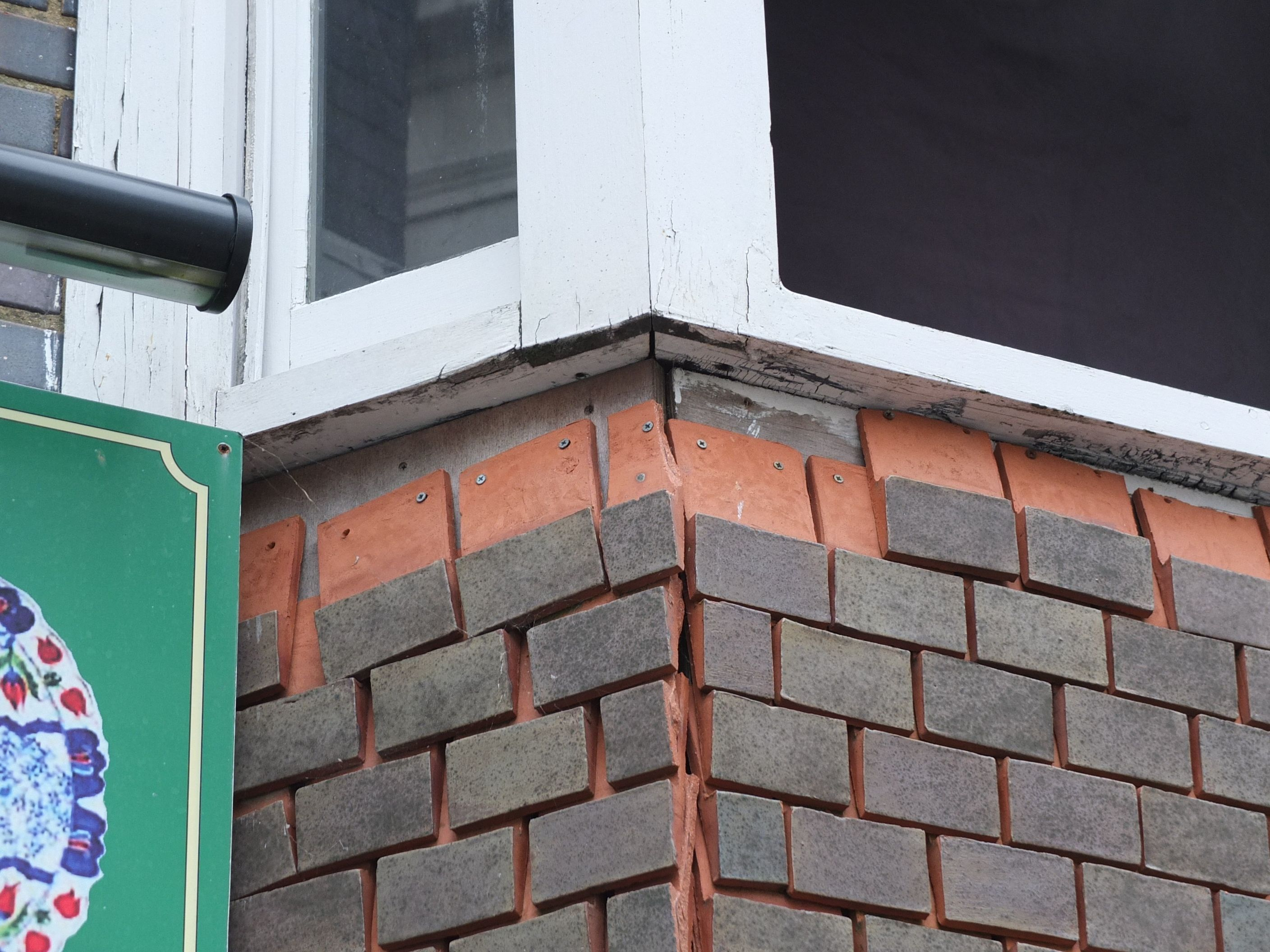
Modern mathematical tiles fixed to the building in Pool Valley, Brighton

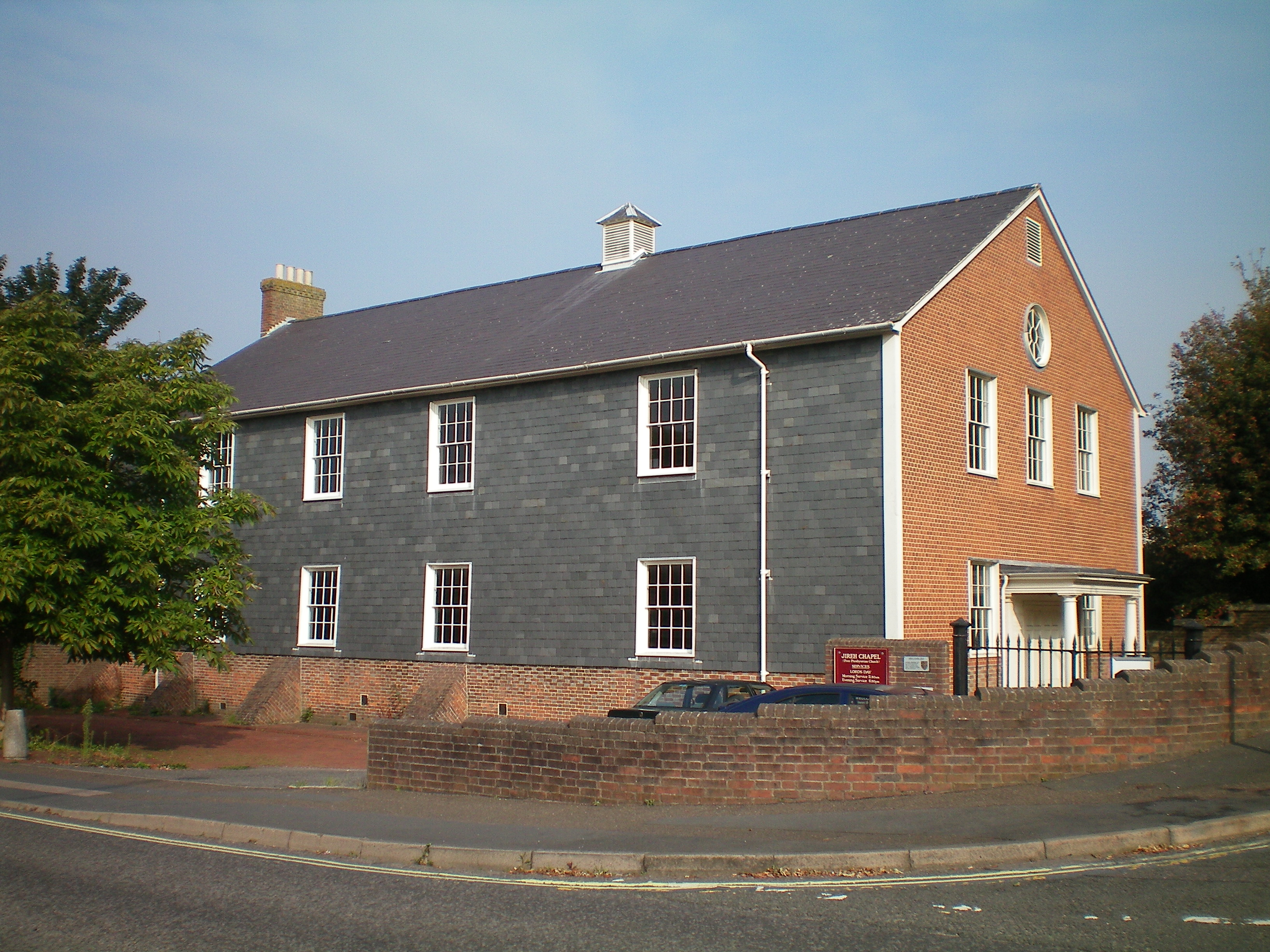
The Jireh Chapel at Cliffe, Lewes, has one mathematical-tiled face

== See also ==
- Buildings and architecture of Brighton and Hove
