= 9 Pool Valley, Brighton =

18th century building in Brighton, England

9 Pool Valley
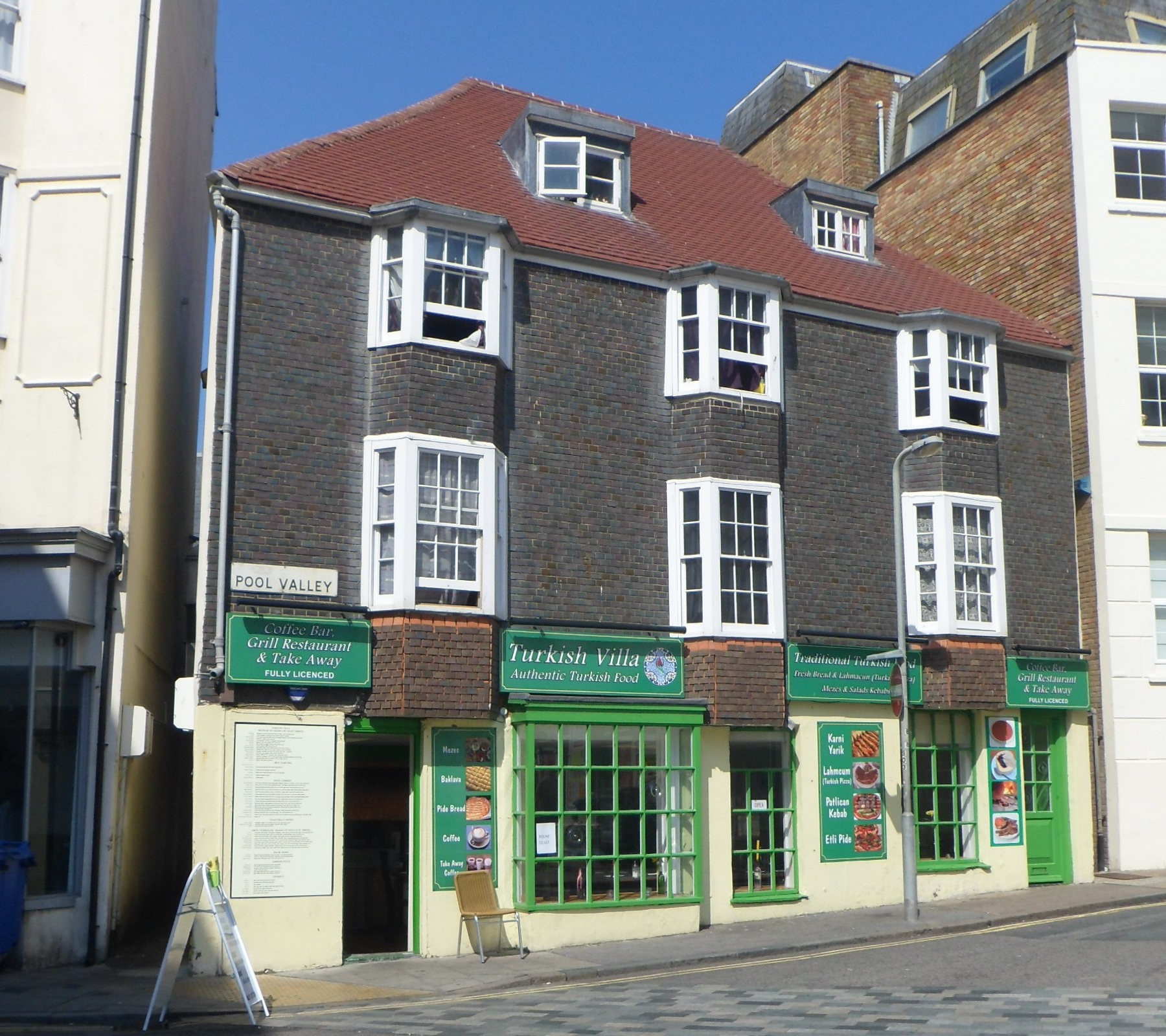
- The building from the east–southeast

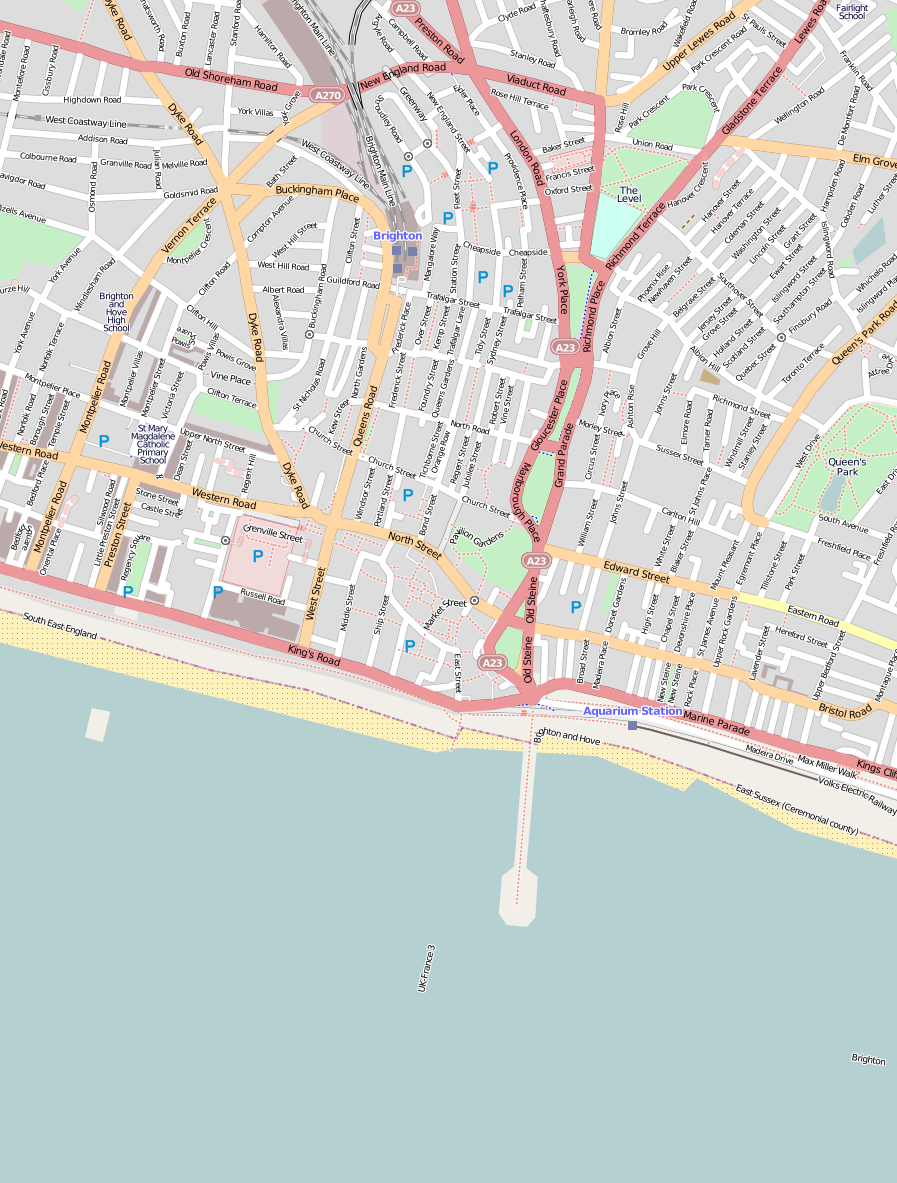
- Location of 9 Pool Valley within central Brighton
- 50.8202°N 0.1385°W
- Location: 9 Pool Valley, Brighton BN1 1NJ, United Kingdom

History
- Built: 1794
- Built for: Possibly Streeter family

Site notes
- Architect: Unknown
- Architectural style: Vernacular

Listed Building – Grade II*
- Official name: No. 9 and attached walls and light standard to rear, Pool Valley
- Designated: 13 October 1952
- Reference no.: 1380721

9 Pool Valley is a late 18th-century house and shop in the centre of Brighton, part of the English city of Brighton and Hove. Built as a bakery and shop for a local family, with two floors of living accommodation above, it later passed to another Brighton family who kept up the baking tradition until the mid-20th century. Since then it has had various commercial uses. Described as "one of the most famous surviving early buildings" in Brighton and "a charming relic",[1] the exterior is clad in distinctive black glazed mathematical tiles. English Heritage has listed it at Grade II* for its architectural and historical importance.

== History ==
Brighton is situated on the English Channel coast at a point where several valleys meet the sea. One of these was formed by the flow of the Wellesbourne, a winterbourne which came to the surface at Patcham. The intermittent flow of the stream created a boggy, marshy area of land around which the old village of Brighthelmstone developed. Just before entering the sea, it formed a small pool. As demand for land grew in the late 18th century during a period of rapid growth, the Wellesbourne was diverted into a culvert and built over: the Prince of Wales and the Duke of Marlborough paid for this. The pool was hidden under a new road, Pool Valley, in 1792–93.

Pool Valley connected the south end of Old Steine and the seafront. Old Steine (or The Steine) was the name now given to the marshy valley bottom previously used by fishermen drying their nets, and for the growing of hemp: it had been drained, and by 1790 it formed the focal point of the growing town of Brighton. Houses and entertainment venues surrounded it and faced the grass, which was used for promenading; railings were built around the land; and the fishermen were evicted.

As soon as the new road opened, buildings were built on both sides. The structure at number 9, on the northwest side of the street, was built for both commercial and residential use: the ground floor was used as a bakery, and there were two floors of accommodation above. It may have been built for the Streeters, a local family who were involved in the baking trade. In 1845, the business was run as a bakery and shop by Sarah Streeter. The Cowley family, long established in Brighton, took over at some point before the 1861 Census, after which the business became known as Cowley's Bun Shop and, later, Ye Olde Bunn Shoppe. Around the middle of the 20th century, the building passed out of the Cowley family's ownership, and the ground-floor shop unit was converted to other commercial uses such as a restaurant.

The building was listed at Grade II* on 13 October 1952. Such buildings are defined as being "particularly important ... [and] of more than special interest". As of February 2001, it was one of 70 Grade II*-listed buildings and structures, and 1,218 listed buildings of all grades, in the city of Brighton and Hove.

== Architecture ==
The building is one of the oldest surviving houses in Brighton, and has been called "one of [its] most famous surviving early buildings". Its modest appearance and small size prompted architectural historian Harry Stuart Goodhart-Rendel, a former resident of Brighton, to call it "as charming a relic of ... Brighthelmstone [Brighton's former name] as anyone could wish to see". It is a three-storey building with a modern shopfront on the lowest floor, two storeys in residential use above, and a large hipped roof with dormer windows.

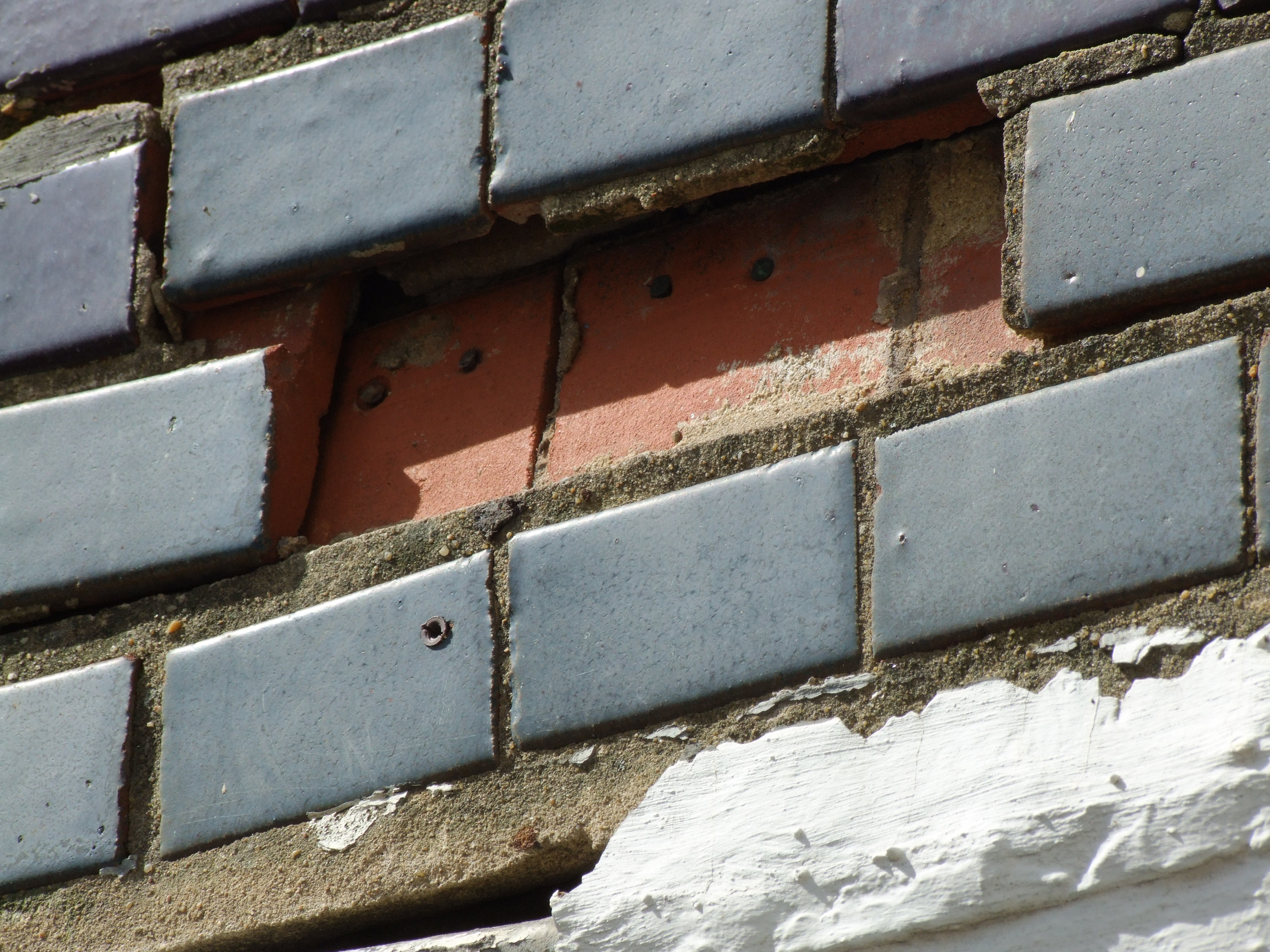
Two missing tiles show the structure of the top floors' cladding

The top two floors are laid with black glazed mathematical tiles—often used in the 18th and 19th centuries on buildings in Brighton, and a characteristic feature of the local architecture. The second and third storeys also have canted bay windows; to the sides and rear (facing an ancient alleyway), original sash windows remain. The left dormer window is a casement, while the right has a sash window.

== Bibliography ==
- Antram, Nicholas; Morrice, Richard (2008). Brighton and Hove. Pevsner Architectural Guides. London: Yale University Press. ISBN 978-0-300-12661-7.
- Carder, Timothy (1990). The Encyclopaedia of Brighton. Lewes: East Sussex County Libraries. ISBN 0-86147-315-9.
- Gilbert, Edmund M. (1975) [1954]. Brighton: Old Ocean's Bauble. Hassocks: Flare Books. ISBN 0-901759-39-2.
- Musgrave, Clifford (1981). Life in Brighton. Rochester: Rochester Press. ISBN 0-571-09285-3.
- Nairn, Ian; Pevsner, Nikolaus (1965). The Buildings of England: Sussex. Harmondsworth: Penguin Books. ISBN 0-14-071028-0.
