= Royal Crescent, Brighton =

Royal Crescent
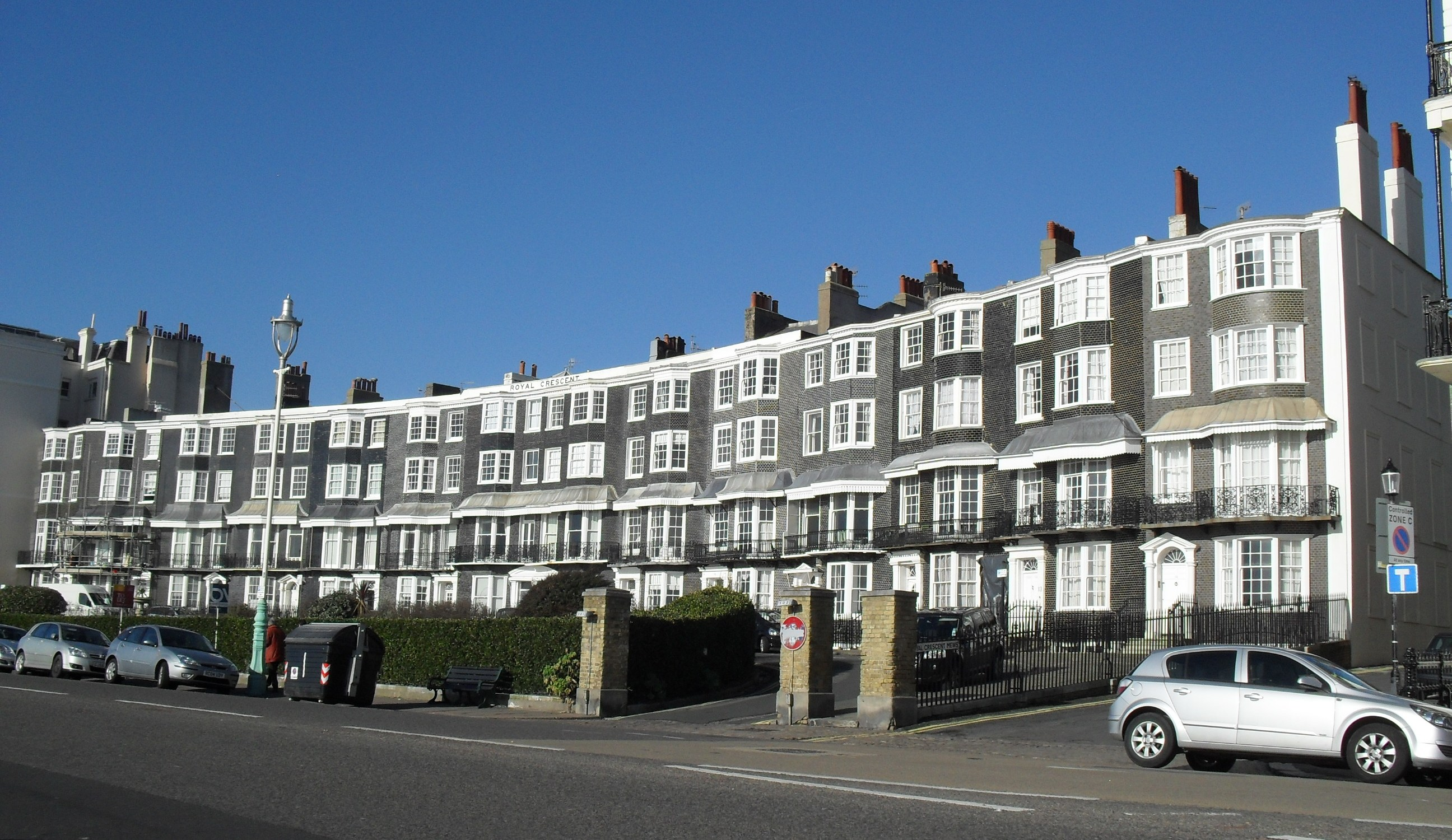
- The crescent from the southeast

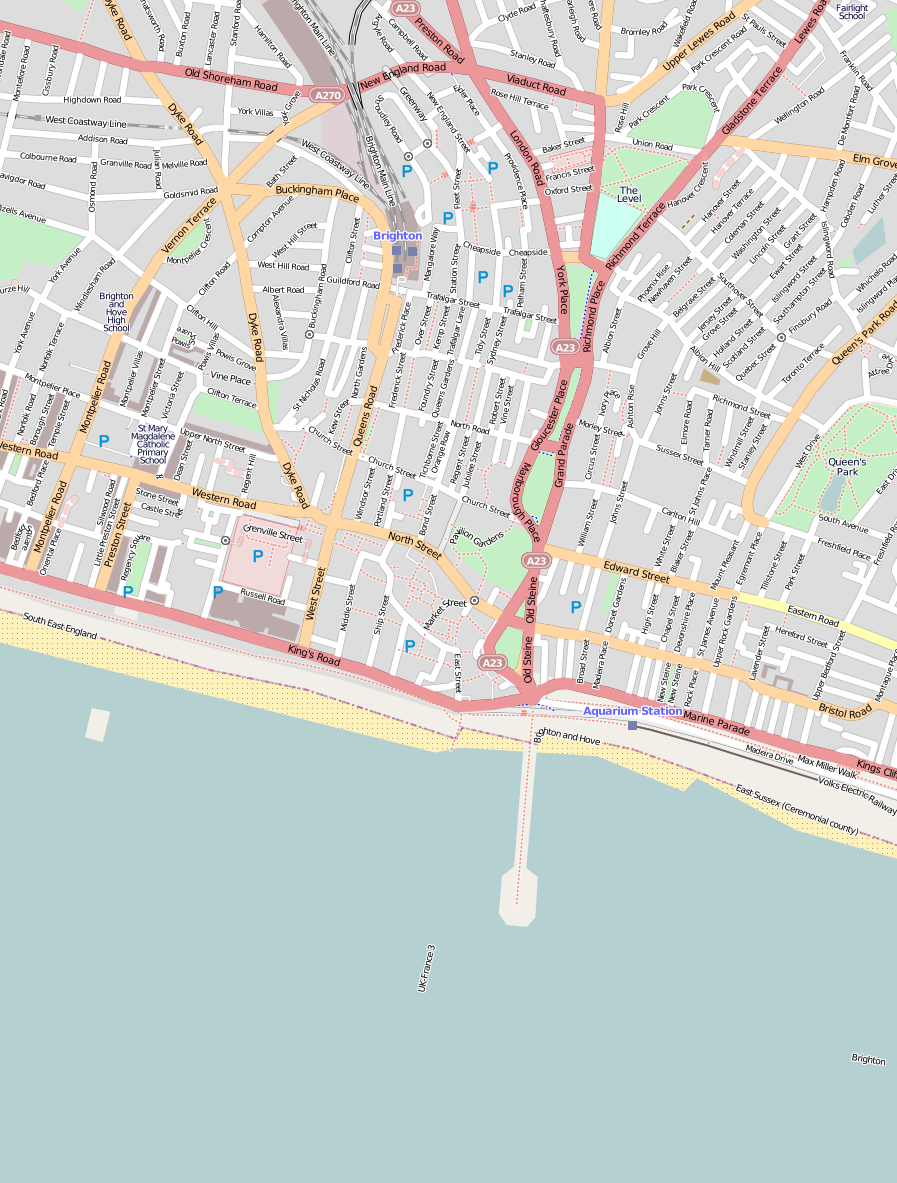
- Location of Royal Crescent within central Brighton
- 50.8185°N 0.1253°W
- Location: Royal Crescent, Marine Parade, Brighton, Brighton and Hove, East Sussex BN2 1AL, England

History
- Built: 1798–1807
- Built for: J.B. Otto

Site notes
- Architect: Unknown
- Architectural style: Classical

Listed Building – Grade II*
- Official name: Nos. 1–14 (Consecutive) Royal Crescent and attached railings
- Designated: 13 October 1952
- Reference no.: 1380838

Royal Crescent Mansions
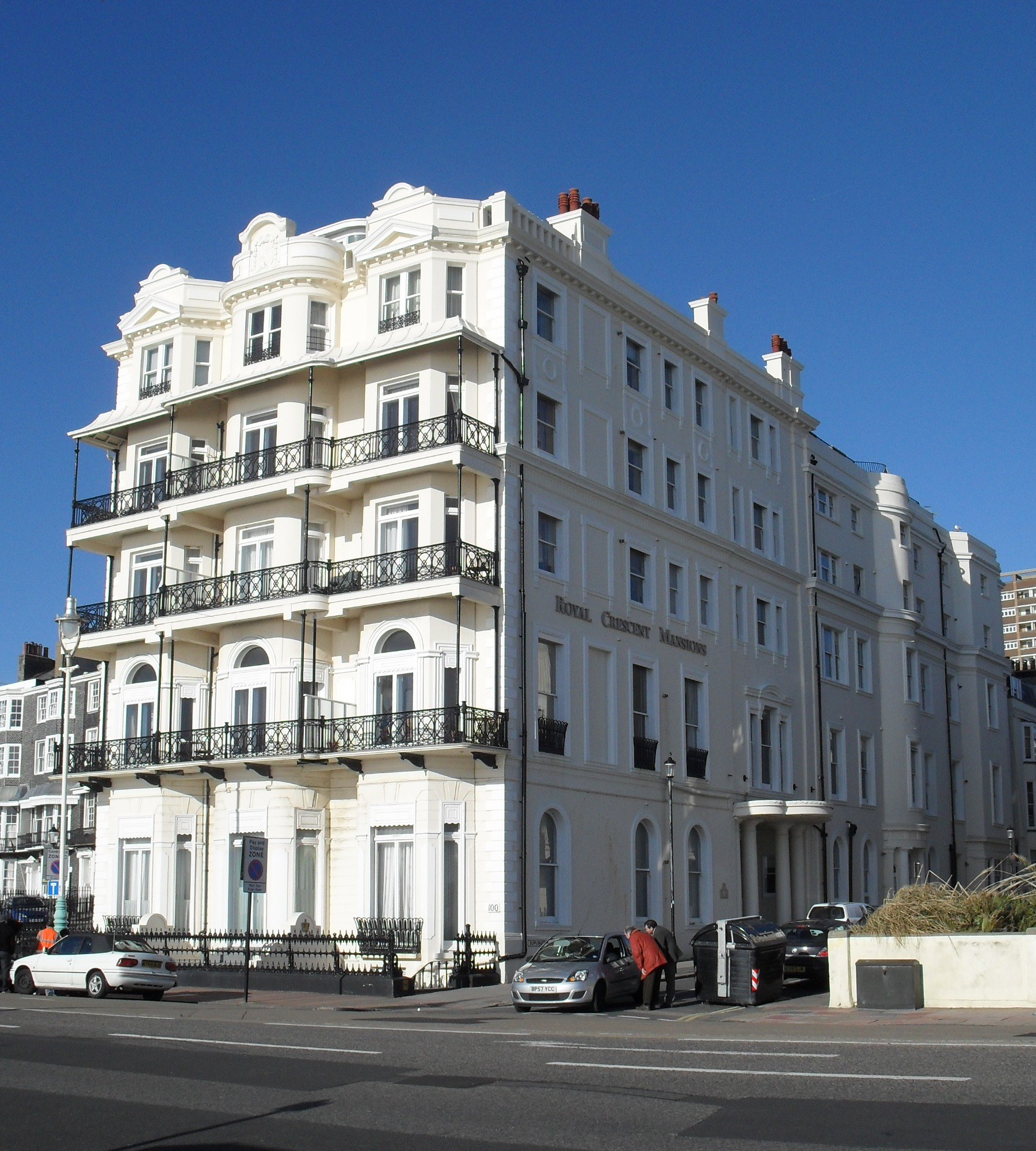
- The building from the southeast
- Interactive map of Royal Crescent Mansions
- 50.8185°N 0.1253°W
- Location: Royal Crescent Mansions, 100–101 Marine Parade, Brighton, Brighton and Hove, East Sussex BN2 1AX, England

History
- Built: Early 19th century
- Rebuilt: 1848–1857 (as hotel)

Site notes
- Architectural style: Classical

Listed Building – Grade II
- Official name: Royal Crescent Hotel and attached walls and railings
- Designated: 20 August 1971
- Reference no.: 1381755

Royal Crescent is a crescent-shaped terrace of houses on the seafront in Brighton, part of the English city of Brighton and Hove. Built in the late 18th and early 19th century as a speculative development on the open cliffs east of Brighton by a wealthy merchant, the 14 lodging houses formed the town's eastern boundary until about 1820. It was the seaside resort's first planned architectural composition, and the first built intentionally to face the sea. The variety of building materials used include black glazed mathematical tiles—a characteristic feature of Brighton's 18th-century architecture. English Heritage has listed the crescent at Grade II* for its architectural and historical importance. An adjacent five-storey building, formerly the Royal Crescent Hotel but now converted into flats with the name Royal Crescent Mansions, is listed separately at Grade II.

== History ==
Brighton's transformation from fishing village to high-class, fashionable spa town and resort happened in the second half of the 18th century and was prompted by several factors. Sea-bathing and drinking seawater became an upper-class fad, encouraged by the publication in 1750 of local doctor Richard Russell's book on the subject. The good climate—sunny, mild and breezy—also became widely known when Brighton's first guidebook was published by Anthony Relhan in 1761. Road improvements encouraged visitors from London and elsewhere: the road from London to Brighton, notorious for its poor (sometimes impassable) condition, was turnpiked throughout its length in 1770. The arrival of royalty and the effects of their patronage then gave the town such prestige that it became Britain's largest and most important seaside resort. The Duke of Cumberland lived in the town from 1779; the Prince of Wales first visited him in 1783 (although he may also have come in search of Brighton's reputed health benefits); and he liked it so much that he came back every year and eventually took up residence at the Royal Pavilion.

Late 18th-century Brighton became popular with speculative developers and builders: either professional builders who bought some land, started erecting houses themselves or using their own men, and tried to sell the remaining land at a profit as construction work continued—this was more common; or rich speculators from other industries who bought land (sometimes from a builder in the circumstances just described) and commissioned them to build houses to their specifications. J.B. Otto, a merchant who owned plantations in the West Indies, was an example of the latter. In 1798, he bought a wide east–west strip of land on the clifftop beyond the eastern edge of the built-up area, about 0.5 miles (0.8 km) east of the Royal Pavilion, and hired an architect (whose identity is not known) and builders to create a crescent of houses which could be let to long-term visitors.

Work started in the same year; the ends of the crescent were started first. The project was then delayed when Otto ran out of money; he returned to the West Indies to secure more funds, then came back to Brighton and supervised the completion of the crescent, which happened in 1807. Unlike many contemporary and later developments in Brighton, Otto was able to take his time to complete it because he was not wholly dependent on it for his financial success: his plantations were still his main source of income.

The crescent of 14 houses was the first to be built facing the sea and to be designed in harmony with it. Brighton's 18th-century development had been haphazard and unplanned, and Royal Crescent also represented the first unified architectural design, planned as a set-piece and overseen from start to finish by one man. The grand scale was intended to attract middle- and upper-class residents, both permanent and seasonal, and it was immediately successful: early tenants included the Rice family, a brewing dynasty from London.

In 1802, Otto attempted to impress the Prince of Wales—probably with a view to obtaining an invitation to dine with him at the Royal Pavilion, which was the pinnacle of social achievement in Brighton—by erecting a statue of him at Royal Crescent. He commissioned a sculptor called Rossi to do the work; he used Coade stone, ceramic stoneware manufactured by Eleanor Coade in London. The statue was reportedly unable to withstand the weathering effects of sea-spray and strong wind: by 1807, the fingers on the sculpture's left hand had been destroyed, and soon afterwards the whole right arm dropped off. The statue began to be mistaken for Lord Nelson, and the Prince was reportedly so displeased that he forbade Otto's name to be mentioned in his presence. The dilapidated statue—7 feet (2.1 m) tall on a 10-foot (3 m) plinth—was removed in 1819. The gardens in front of the crescent, in which the statue stood, passed into the ownership of the Brighton Corporation after the 1884 Brighton Improvement Act was passed.

Royal Crescent was listed at Grade II* on 13 October 1952. Such buildings are defined as being "particularly important ... [and] of more than special interest". As of February 2001, it was one of 70 Grade II*-listed buildings and structures, and 1,218 listed buildings of all grades, in the city of Brighton and Hove.

Notable residents of Royal Crescent have included actor Sir John Clements—who lived at number 7—and Sir Laurence Olivier, who lived at number 4 with his third wife Joan Plowright and also owned number 5.

== Architecture ==
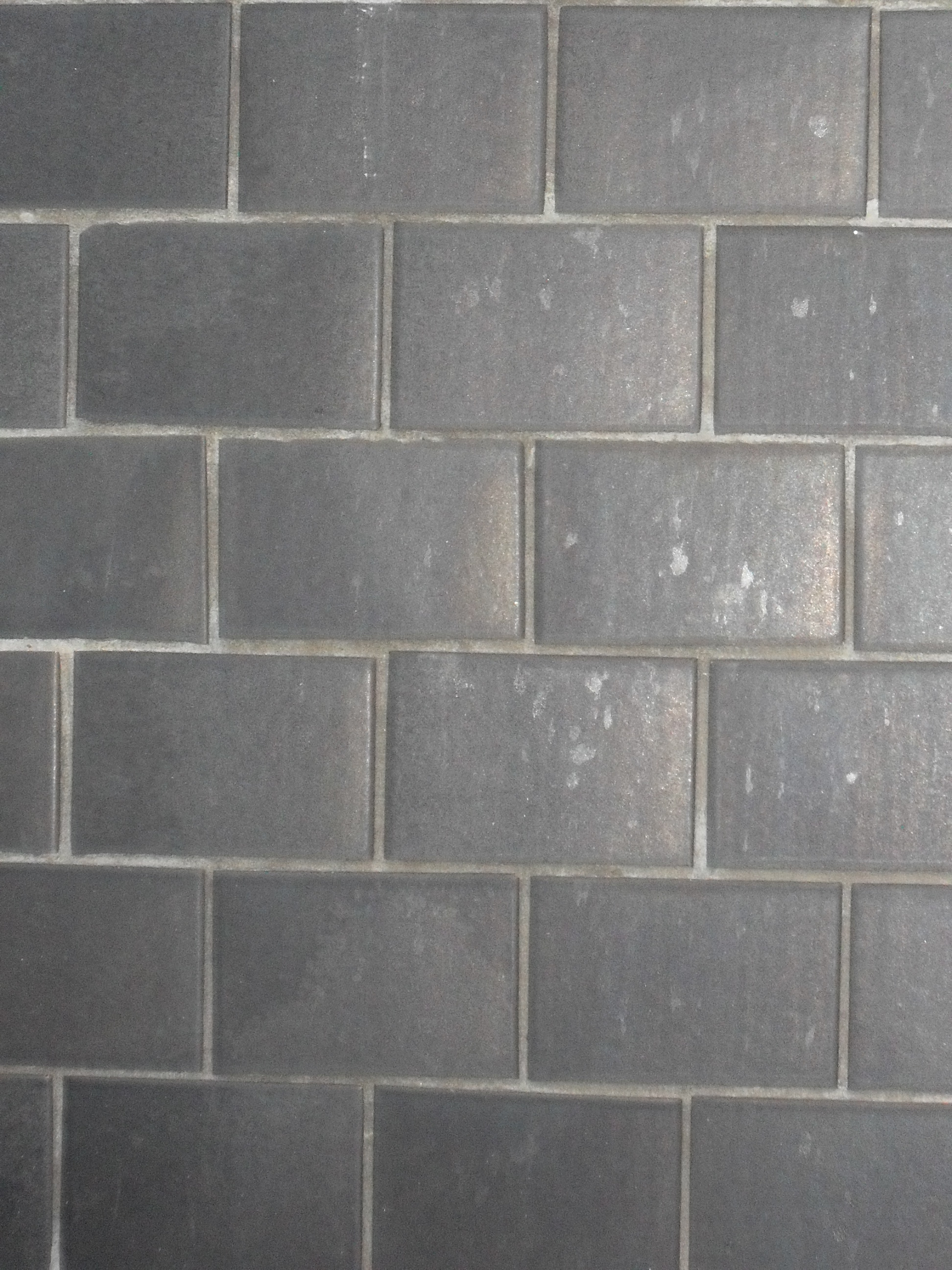
Black glazed mathematical tiles were much used in 18th-century Brighton.

Royal Crescent forms a shallow crescent-shaped of 14 terraced houses on a generally east–west layout behind Marine Parade. Numbers 1 and 14, the houses at each end, stand parallel to that road. Each four-storey house has common stylistic themes. There is a first-floor veranda on every house except number 1, the westernmost house, which has a balcony instead. Each veranda has curved metal roofs (with either cyma recta or cyma reversa mouldings), cast iron railings and bracketed supports.

The whole terrace has a timber-framed façade with brick nogging (infilling) and covered with black glazed mathematical tiles. These were laid in an interlocking pattern to mimic brick, and were frequently used in Brighton in the late 18th century. The glazing produced an iridescent effect which reflected sunlight in a visually pleasing way, and also coped better than bricks with sea-spray and other weathering effects. The houses were originally built with bow windows, but after critics argued that this spoilt the visual effect of the concave curve of the crescent, they were replaced (except at numbers 12 and 14) by canted bay windows with three sides. A parapet, running above numbers 7–10, has the painted legend royal crescent. When the painter of the lettering, a Mr Leggatt, leant back to check his work, he fell off his ladder and was fatally impaled on the metal railings below.

The entrance porches and doorways to each house are considered particularly impressive. The details differ slightly from house to house, but most have open-topped pediments, entablatures, semicircular fanlights and Tuscan-style pilasters.

== Royal Crescent Mansions ==
Standing slightly forward of Royal Crescent immediately to the east, the building now known as Royal Crescent Mansions was originally built as a two-storey house in the early 19th century. Former Foreign Secretary and Prime Minister George Canning once lived there; this is commemorated by a heritage plaque designed by Eric Gill in the 1920s. Extension to five storeys and conversion into a hotel began in 1848, and it opened in its new form in 1857. Some remodelling took place later in the 19th century. The sea-facing façade has a three-window range: from left to right, canted, bowed and canted. Iron balconies span the second, third and fourth floors. The building has nine windows on each floor on its west façade, next to Royal Crescent, and eleven to the east (facing Burlington Street). After many years as a hotel, it was converted to flats.

The building was listed at Grade II on 20 August 1971. As of February 2001, it was one of 1,124 buildings listed at that grade in Brighton and Hove; the status indicates that the building is considered "nationally important and of special interest".

== See also ==
- Grade II* listed buildings in Brighton and Hove
- Grade II listed buildings in Brighton and Hove: P–R
- Media related to Royal Crescent, Brighton at Wikimedia Commons
- Media related to Royal Crescent Mansions, Brighton at Wikimedia Commons
