= Jireh Chapel, Lewes =

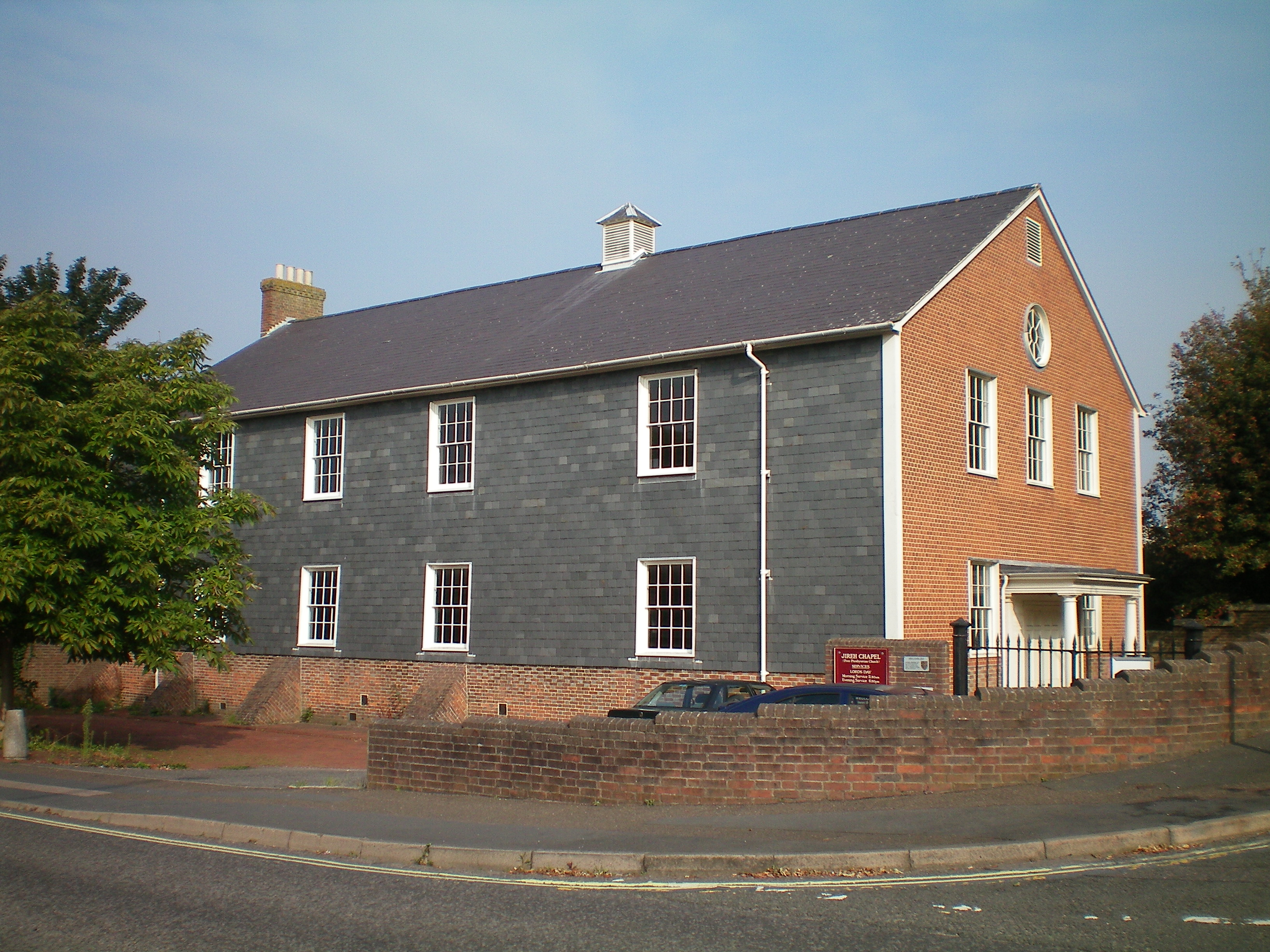
- The chapel from the southeast
- Jireh Chapel, Lewes
- 50.8755°N 0.0187°E
- OS grid reference: TQ 42119 10381
- Location: Malling Street, Cliffe, Lewes, East Sussex BN7 2RD
- Country: England
- Denomination: Baptist
- Churchmanship: Strict Baptist

History
- Former name(s): Jireh Chapel, Jireh Calvinistic Independent Chapel
- Status: Church
- Founded: 1805
- Founder: Jenkin Jenkins

Architecture
- Functional status: Active
- Style: Georgian
- Completed: 1805

Specifications
- Capacity: c. 1000
- Materials: Red brick, mathematical tile

Listed Building – Grade I
- Official name: Jireh Chapel and Sunday School to North
- Designated: 25 February 1952
- Reference no.: 1192055

Jireh Chapel is a former Calvinistic Independent chapel in the Cliffe area of Lewes, the county town of East Sussex and the main town in the local government district of Lewes. It is more than 200 years old and has been designated a Grade I Listed building. Used by the Free Presbyterian Church of Ulster for approximately 25 years in the late 20th and early 21st centuries, it was taken on in 2024 by a Strict Baptist congregation which formerly met at Brighton.

== History ==
The ancient market town of Lewes has a well-established history of Protestant Nonconformism. Many chapels were established in the 18th and 19th centuries in the town itself and in its suburbs of Southover and Cliffe. One such place of worship was the Jireh chapel. In or around 1805 a dispute arose between Jenkin Jenkins, the minister at Cliffe's Countess of Huntingdon's Connexion chapel, and its congregation. He was dismissed by the Countess's Trustees and arranged for a new chapel to be built for him nearby. (The Countess of Huntingdon chapel, which opened in 1775, survived until the 1880s but has been demolished.) Jireh Chapel was placed in the hands of trustees about 1807. Prior to that time it had been the personal property of Jenkin Jenkins. The Trust Deed states that the chapel is a place of Christian worship to be "frequented and enjoyed by a congregation of Protestant Dissenters of the Calvinistic persuasion professing ..". A list of certain Articles of Faith, extracted from the Thirty-Nine Articles of the Church of England, follows.

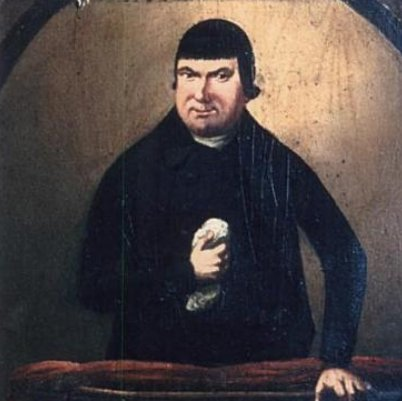
A painting of William Huntington S.S. that hung in the chapel

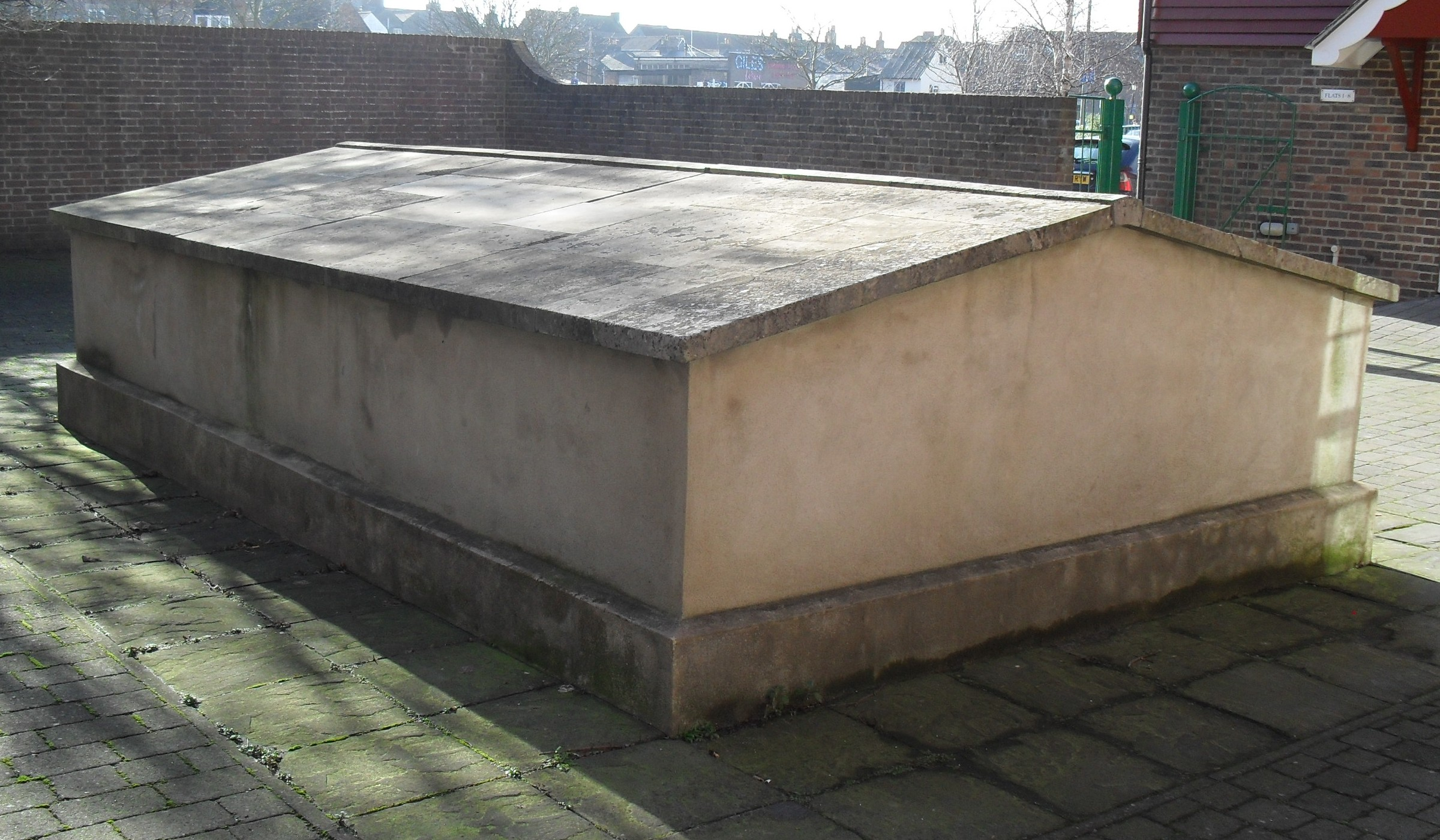
Huntington's grave at the chapel

Jenkins enlisted William Huntington to open the church, which was completed in 1805. Huntington, originally from Cranbrook in Kent, was an orthodox but controversial Calvinist preacher who ministered at Providence Chapel, Grays Inn Lane, London. Known by various pseudonyms, he became very popular in southeast England in the early 19th century, and helped to found several Calvinist chapels. An example of his eccentricity was his reference to Jenkins as "W.A." (the "Welsh Ambassador") and himself as "S.S." ("Sinner Saved"); the "W.A." epithet featured on a tablet below the chapel's gabled roof which commemorated its opening. It reads Jireh chapel erected by J. Jenkins W.A. with the voluntary Contributions of the Citizens of Zion; Anno Domini MDCCCV. Huntington died in 1813 and was buried in a tomb in the small graveyard behind the chapel.

The chapel proved popular, and was extended in 1826 to give a capacity of about 1,000. The interior was almost entirely wooden, with box-pews and galleries. A Sunday school was built in the grounds in 1874; it was linked to the chapel's north wall by a columned porch surmounted by a pediment. The chapel's use declined in the 20th century, and the Loyal Orange Institution of England, Southdowns Lodge used it for their annual commemorative service on the Sunday prior to November 5. Many members of the various Bonfire Societies attended this annual "Bonfire" service. The Free Presbyterian Church of Ulster acquired the chapel in April 1998 and used it as a place of worship until January 2024. The denomination was founded by Ian Paisley on 17 March 1951 in Crossgar, a village in County Down, Northern Ireland. It quickly became established across Northern Ireland, where dozens of churches were founded, and some congregations developed in the rest of Great Britain as well. Scotland and Wales each have several, and in 2026 there are seven in England.

== Architecture ==
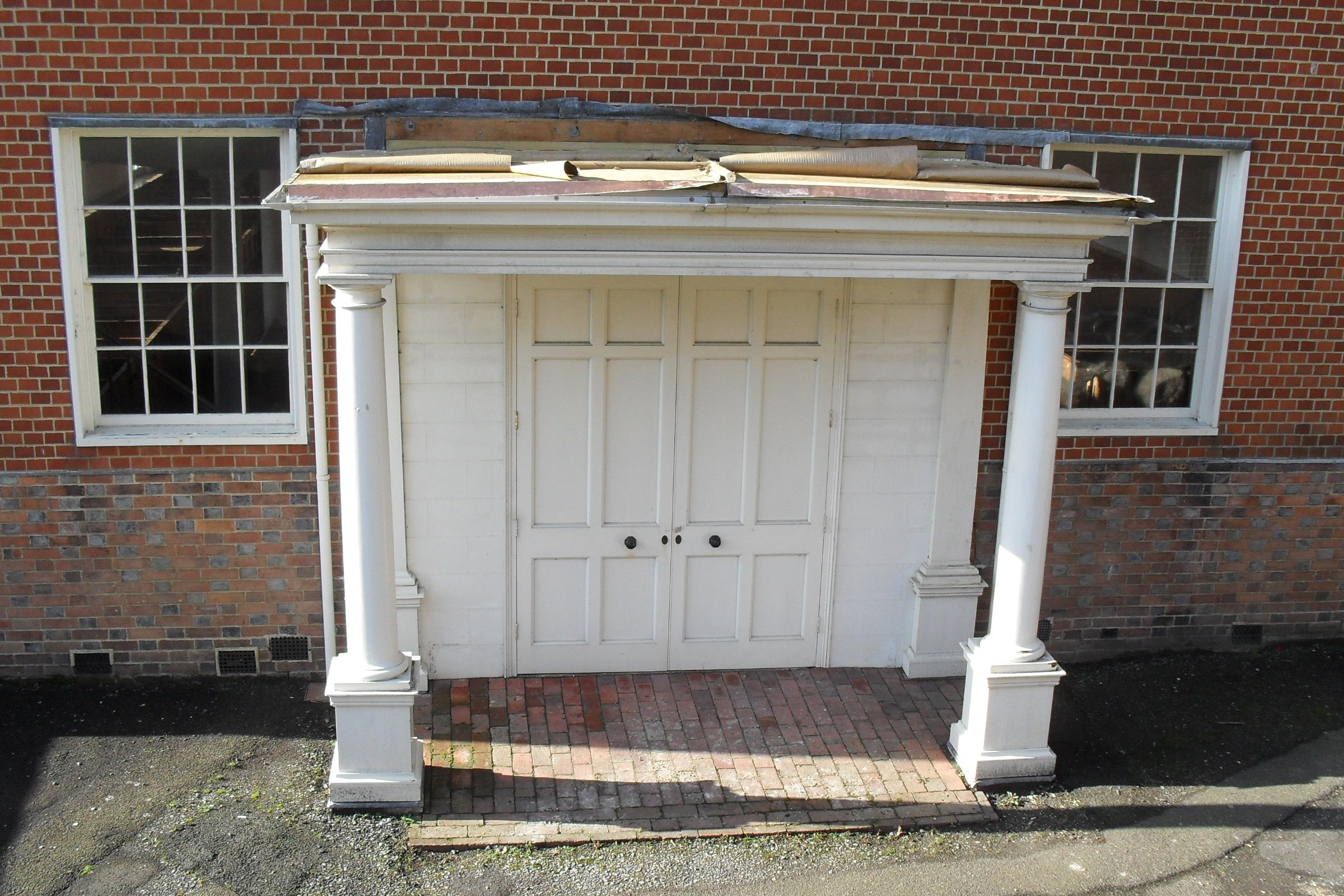
The Tuscan-columned porch

Although externally clad in red brick and tiles, the chapel is completely timber-framed. The entrance is at the east end and is framed by a porch with columns of the Tuscan order, described by Nikolaus Pevsner as "over-broad". Above this, three evenly spaced sash windows, an oculus and the stone tablet sit below the gable. A chimney breast extends up the west wall. The roof is covered with slate tiles and has a small boxlike louvred projection, topped with a pyramid-style cap, in the middle. There are four pairs of sash windows in the north and south walls, which are faced with mathematical tiles and slates respectively.

Inside, wood predominates: the barrel-vaulted timber roof is supported on wooden columns attached to the gallery which runs around all four sides of the interior. The galleries are in turn held up with five timber columns on the north and south sides. Wooden staircases leading to the galleries are situated in all four corners. An octagonal pulpit stands at the west end. Original pine box-pews remain in the galleries and the main body of the chapel.

== The church today ==
Since December, 2024, the chapel has been used for worship by the Strict Baptist church formed at Galeed Chapel, Brighton, in 1869. Two Sunday services and evening meetings on Wednesday and Friday take place each week.

The church was designated a Grade I Listed building on 25 February 1952.

Under the name Jireh Chapel, the church was licensed for worship in accordance with the Places of Worship Registration Act 1855 with the registration number 15521.

== See also ==
- Grade I listed buildings in East Sussex
- List of places of worship in Lewes District

== Notes ==
=== Bibliography ===
- Elleray, D. Robert (2004). Sussex Places of Worship. Worthing: Optimus Books. ISBN 0-9533132-7-1.
- Nairn, Ian; Pevsner, Nikolaus (1965). The Buildings of England: Sussex. Harmondsworth: Penguin Books. ISBN 0-14-071028-0.
- North, James E. (n.d.). A History of Jireh Chapel, Lewes. Huntingtonian Press.
- Stell, Christopher (1999). Paul Corbey Finney (ed.). Seeing Beyond the Word: Visual Arts and the Calvinist Tradition. Grand Rapids: William B. Eerdmans Publishing Company. ISBN 0-8028-3860-X.
