= Grade II* listed buildings in Brighton and Hove =

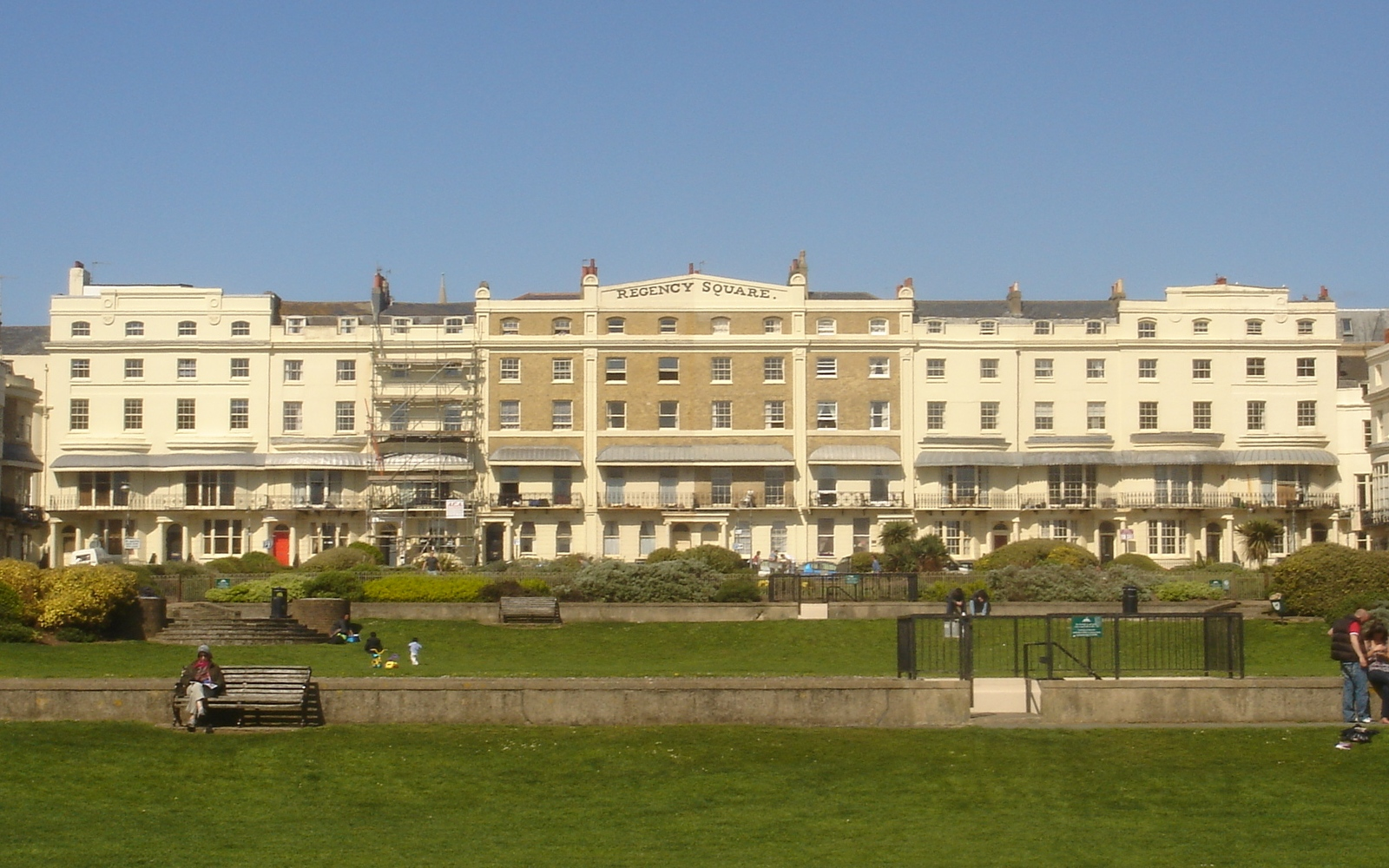
The north side of Regency Square, a "set piece" by prolific local architects Amon Wilds and his son, displays typical features of Brighton's 19th-century residential development: verandas, stucco, pediments and bow-fronts.

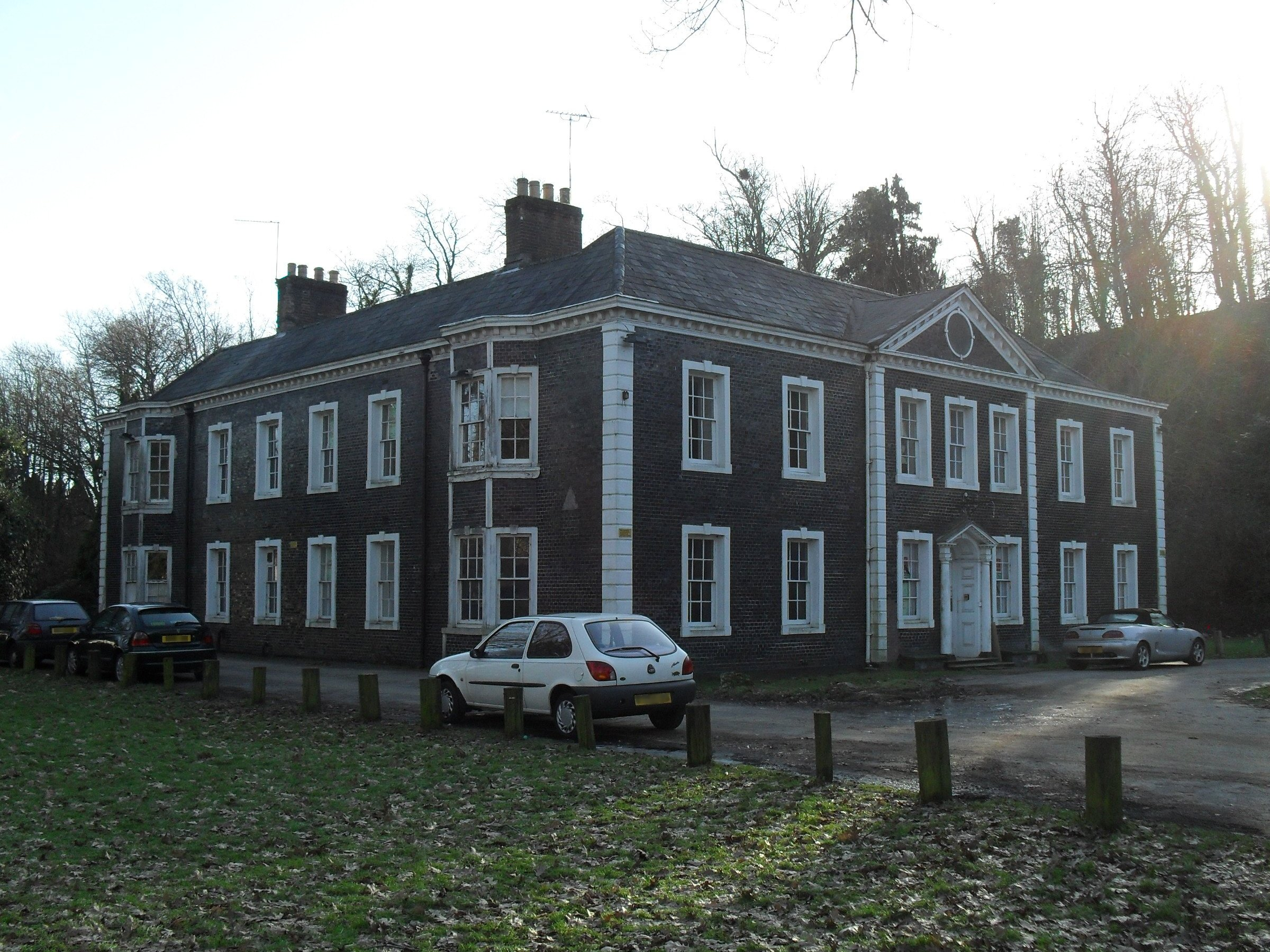
Mathematical tiles—glazed black tiles, laid to resemble brickwork—are another characteristic local feature. Patcham Place, built in 1764, is faced with them.

There are 72 Grade II* listed buildings in the city of Brighton and Hove, England. The city, on the English Channel coast approximately 52 miles (84 km) south of London, was formed as a unitary authority in 1997 by the merger of the neighbouring towns of Brighton and Hove. Queen Elizabeth II granted city status in 2000.

In England, a building or structure is defined as "listed" when it is placed on a statutory register of buildings of "special architectural or historic interest" by the Secretary of State for Culture, Media and Sport, a Government department, in accordance with the Planning (Listed Buildings and Conservation Areas) Act 1990. English Heritage, a non-departmental public body, acts as an agency of this department to administer the process and advise the department on relevant issues. There are three grades of listing status. Grade I, the highest, is defined as being of "exceptional interest"; Grade II* is used for "particularly important buildings of more than special interest"; and Grade II, the lowest, is used for buildings of "special interest".

Brighton was founded on top of the sea-facing cliffs where the South Downs meet the English Channel. A series of valleys allowed transport routes to develop towards Lewes, London and other important settlements. Although Neolithic settlement has been confirmed, the Anglo-Saxons were the first permanent settlers; the population was about 400 by the time of the Domesday survey in 1086. Its neighbour Hove, on flatter, more fertile land to the west, developed concurrently but independently: its existence was recorded in 1288, and two separate prebends (similar to benefices) existed by 1291. Fishing, farming and smuggling drove the economy, but decline set in during the Middle Ages and persisted until the 19th century. Coastal flooding destroyed buildings on many occasions, the parish church fell into ruins, and the population—almost all poor—numbered about 100 in 1801.

Brighton became fashionable as a holiday destination and health resort in the mid-18th century, and royal patronage (particularly by the flamboyant Prince Regent) increased its popularity with high society and the upper classes. Day-trippers and longer-term visitors from other social classes soon followed, and by the early 19th century the town was Britain's foremost seaside resort. Developments such as Royal Crescent, Regency Square, Oriental Place and Park Crescent characterised the bold architectural vision of the town's new residents; the design triumvirate of Amon Wilds, Amon Henry Wilds and Charles Busby were instrumental in realising these plans. Hove's fortunes improved in line with Brighton's success, and developments such as Palmeira Mansions and Sir Isaac Goldsmid's Adelaide Crescent covered the fields between the ancient village of Hove and Brighton's continuous westward expansion.

The Vicar of Brighton, Rev. Henry Michell Wagner—a wealthy, progressive clergyman with strong Anglo-Catholic views and an interest in architecture—and his son and successor Rev. Arthur Wagner were responsible for an array of new churches throughout Brighton and Hove (especially in poorer residential areas); many are listed at Grade I, and the Grade II*-listed examples of St Martin's and St Paul's merely add to a stock of Victorian places of worship which has been described as one of the best outside London. Elsewhere during the Victorian era, the former parish churches of both Brighton and Hove were rebuilt; an elaborate synagogue was provided for the Jewish population; Roman Catholic worship became established at the Classical-style St John the Baptist's Church; a new parish church was established in the form of Charles Barry's St Peter's; and several other churches were established.

Both towns were incorporated as boroughs: Brighton in 1854, Hove in 1898. Expansion in the 20th century, as the urban area became a large regional centre, resulted in ancient villages being absorbed into the boroughs. Hangleton, West Blatchington, Ovingdean, Rottingdean and others had historic buildings and long-established churches of their own; by 1928, Acts of Parliament had brought them into "Greater Brighton and Hove". In 1997, the towns were officially united as a unitary authority; three years later, city status was secured.

Some listings include contributory fixtures such as surrounding walls or railings in front of the building. These are summarised by notes alongside the building name.

== Grade II* listed buildings ==
Grade two star listed buildings
Name	Image	Completed	Location	Notes	Refs
All Saints Church		12th century	Patcham; 50.8666°N 0.1507°W	The present nave and parts of the chancel remain from the Norman-era church, which replaced a pre-Domesday place of worship on the same site in this downland village (absorbed into the Borough of Brighton in 1928). A wall painting depicting the Last Judgment has been dated to about 1230. The church was heavily restored in the Victorian era.	
Portslade Manor		12th century	Portslade; 50.8432°N 0.2182°W	The manor of Portslade existed before the Domesday survey of 1086, and the modest remains of a Norman manor house stand next to St Nicolas Church. The two-storey rubble and flint structure was extensively plundered in the Victorian era to provide material for imitation ruins nearby, but two 12th-century round-headed windows remain.	
St Margaret's Church		12th century	Rottingdean; 50.8068°N 0.0575°W	Rottingdean's parish church, damaged by French raiders in 1377, has a Norman nave and the remains of a contemporary transept, but most of the flint building is Early English Gothic; no trace of the original Saxon structure remains. Sir George Gilbert Scott was commissioned to restore it in 1856.	
St Nicolas Church		12th century	Portslade; 50.8431°N 0.2182°W	The village of Portslade, on a Roman road, has a Norman church with subsequent remodelling and extensions: a typical Sussex church, according to Pevsner. A memorial chapel for the locally important Brackenbury family was built in knapped flint in the 1870s; the rest of the church is flint rubble with some Caen stone.	
St Peter's Church		13th century	Preston Village; 50.8423°N 0.1495°W	The Churches Conservation Trust now own Preston's medieval parish church, which was superseded by the nearby St John the Evangelist's Church after a fire in 1906. St Peter's is the third church to have stood on the site. The chancel, nave and tower (with its "Sussex cap" roof) date from about 1260, but the vestry and porch were added during architect James Woodman's 1872 restoration.	
St Helen's Church		c. 1300	Hangleton; 50.8511°N 0.2009°W	Pevsner described this formerly isolated downland village church as standing "mellow and humble in [the] desperate surroundings" of the postwar Hangleton housing estate. The Norman building was unchanged until a modest restoration in 1871, and only became part of the Borough of Hove in 1928. It is of flint with Caen stone quoins, and has wall paintings, blocked doorways and a hagioscope.	
St Nicholas' Church		14th century	West Hill; 50.8254°N 0.1449°W	Until the Chapel Royal was built in the late 18th century, this was Brighton's only Anglican church. The present building—mostly 14th-century, but restored by Richard Cromwell Carpenter in 1853—succeeded an 11th-century predecessor. It survived French raiders and storms, and retains some medieval work (especially in the castellated tower). It lost its parish church status to St Peter's in 1873.	
Hangleton Manor Inn and The Old Manor House		c. 1550	Hangleton; 50.8481°N 0.2052°W	Hove's oldest secular building, the former manor house of Hangleton, is now a restaurant and bar. Most parts are mid 16th-century—after Lewes Priory was demolished in 1537, some of its flints were used in the building—but one doorway is a century older, and the western wing probably matches the dimensions of the 14th-century building. An allegedly haunted 17th-century dovecote remains outside.	
Old Farmhouse		1619	Rottingdean; 50.8068°N 0.0598°W	This is joined to the later Down House: it extends from its rear to form an L-shape, and is hidden behind it. The construction date is attested by a stone set into the east face. It is of flint with quoins and other dressings of red brick and a roof laid with tiles.	
Hillside		1724	Rottingdean; 50.8070°N 0.0597°W	This red- and blue-brick house, with five windows at first-floor level and four surrounding a prominent porch with Doric/Tuscan columns, has a date-stone showing 1724. There are chimneys at each end of the slate-clad roof. An extension projects westwards.	
Former stables of Stanmer House		c. 1725	Stanmer; 50.8697°N 0.1033°W	The yellow- and red-brick and flint stable block surrounds a courtyard in the grounds of the Grade I-listed Stanmer House. Alterations in 1778 and the 19th century changed the appearance and increased the hay-storage capacity. An arched entrance leads into the courtyard. The slate roof has some dormer windows.	
Down House		1730	Rottingdean; 50.8077°N 0.0593°W	This brick and flint house of six bays was built perpendicular to The Old Farmhouse, facing Rottingdean village green. The façade was built in 1730, but some structural work is 40 years older. The entrance is arched, topped by a pediment and flanked by Doric columns. All windows are sashes.	
Preston Manor^{[C]}		1738	Preston Village; 50.8425°N 0.1501°W	Thomas Western rebuilt the old manor house in 1738, but parts of the medieval building remain inside. There are later 18th-century additions as well; and in 1905 C. Stanley Peach was commissioned to and remodel the building in an Edwardian style. It is now owned by the council, and its preserved Edwardian interior is on public display. The main façade has five bays.	
Patcham Place		1764	Patcham; 50.8649°N 0.1532°W	This has its origins in William West's building of 1554, but John Payne's wholesale reconstruction of 1764 gave the building its present appearance. The walls of the seven-bay house have glazed black mathematical tiles, and there are wooden quoins and a Tuscan-columned pedimented doorway. The building was the city's Youth Hostel, but this use has ceased.	
First Base Day Centre (formerly St Stephen's Church)		1766	Montpelier; 50.8266°N 0.1531°W	John Crunden's building was originally the ballroom of the Castle Inn, one of Brighton's first entertainment venues. It became the Prince Regent's private chapel, and was later claimed by the Ecclesiastical Commissioners, taken down, moved a mile across Brighton and rebuilt as a parish church. Since its closure in 1939 it has had various uses; it is now a day-care centre for vulnerable people.	
Old Ship Assembly Rooms		1767	Brighton; 50.8204°N 0.1424°W	The Old Ship Hotel, the oldest inn in Brighton, was established around 1600, but its popularity grew when the Adamesque assembly room was added in 1767 by Robert Golden. Only the card-room part of his design survives unchanged; the ballroom and coffee room have been altered. The stuccoed seafront façade dates from about 1895.	
North Gate House^{[B]}		c. 1774	Brighton; 50.8235°N 0.1372°W	This three-storey building, now used as an administrative building, is the only surviving part of a terrace of nine houses built in about 1774. The rest were demolished when the area around the Royal Pavilion was redeveloped in the 1820s. It has flint, brick and stucco work, and ogive arches are used as a stylistic theme. It was extended and refurbished for Princess Augusta Sophia in 1832.	
Chapel Royal		1793	Brighton; 50.8226°N 0.1394°W	The patronage of the Prince Regent was vital to Brighton's early development, but he attended church infrequently—preferring to socialise than travel the long distance from the Royal Pavilion to St Nicholas' Church. The Vicar of Brighton arranged for a new church to be built nearer the Pavilion accordingly. Thomas Saunders' stuccoed chapel was remodelled in red brick and terracotta by Arthur Blomfield in 1882, who also added the corner clock tower.	
9 Pool Valley^{[A]}		1794	Brighton; 50.8202°N 0.1385°W	A pool was built over in 1792–93, and the road called Pool Valley was quickly developed. The oldest surviving house, and one of the oldest in Brighton, was used as a bun shop until the mid-20th century, and still has a shopfront on the ground floor. A hipped roof, black mathematical tiles and first-floor bay windows are also visible. Harry Stuart Goodhart-Rendel called it a "charming relic".	
Court House and 1 and 2 Court House Close		18th century	Rottingdean; 50.8075°N 0.0596°W	This flint-built house used to be a farmhouse. It has dressings of red brick, a five-window range, five bays and a porch with a decorative frieze as part of its entablature, which is supported on chamfers resting on columns. There is also some stucco work, and the roof is tiled.	
Southdown House^{[B]}		18th century	Patcham; 50.8637°N 0.1512°W	This Georgian house was built early in that era, but its exact date is not recorded. The main building material is knapped flint; brick quoins and some cobblestones are also used. There is a five-window range on the façade, and three dormer windows and two chimneys project from the tiled roof. Many features inside are original, including a newel staircase with a mahogany handrail.	
Brighton Museum and Art Gallery^{[C]}		1804	Brighton; 50.8235°N 0.1378°W	This is part of the Brighton Dome complex, in which the Corn Exchange and Dome are listed at Grade I. William Porden's former stables, built for the Prince Regent's Royal Pavilion, were remodelled several times in the 19th century, and latterly by Francis May (the Brighton Corporation surveyor and architect) in 1901–02. He introduced a Hindoo style reminiscent of the Royal Pavilion itself. The interior is Moorish Revival.	
1–14 Royal Crescent^{[C]}		1807	Brighton; 50.8185°N 0.1253°W	Brighton's first planned architectural set-piece, this terrace of lodging houses formed its eastern boundary until 1820. The Classical-style houses, built speculatively by rich merchant J.B. Otto in an isolated clifftop location, have bay windows, balustrades, verandas on the second of four storeys, black mathematical tiles and a timber-framed structure filled with brick.	
Ovingdean Rectory		1807	Ovingdean; 50.8157°N 0.0768°W	Ovingdean's former rectory stands next to St Wulfran's Church and the village green. It is primarily of brick, but cobblestones cover the façade, which also has four windows on the first floor and a Tuscan-columned porch below. There are also dormer windows and chimneys.	
Theatre Royal		1807	North Laine; 50.8234°N 0.1398°W		
2–4 Regency Square^{[C]}		c. 1818	Brighton; 50.8230°N 0.1509°W	Forming the southwest part of the square, this part of the terrace has four storeys. Number 2, a former home of social reformer William King, is built of brick; the others are stuccoed. The entrance porches have both Doric and Ionic columns.	
5–20 Regency Square^{[C]}		c. 1818	Brighton; 50.8227°N 0.1510°W	The west side of the square is formed by this long terrace of houses of mixed height: numbers 5 to 13 have four storeys, while 14 to 20 rise to three storeys. Most combine stucco at ground level with painted brickwork above, but four houses are entirely stuccoed. The windows show variety as well, although a three-window range is the commonest layout. Features include triglyphs, modillions and paterae (circular motifs).	
26–37 Regency Square^{[C]}		c. 1818	Brighton; 50.8233°N 0.1504°W	The terrace of houses on Regency Square's north side face the sea across the sloping gardens. The central block, numbers 30 to 33, are topped by a wide pediment on which regency square is picked out in black. Numbers 26 to 29 and 34 to 37 have single-window ranges to each house and form subordinate wings. Porches vary from Ionic to Doric.	
51–56 Regency Square^{[C]}		c. 1818	Brighton; 50.8228°N 0.1497°W	This terrace is a three-part composition: numbers 53 and 54 stand forward slightly. Like most of the other houses in the square, the façades are of painted brick and stucco, and the roofs are tiled with slate. All six houses rise to four storeys.	
57–59 Regency Square^{[C]}		c. 1818	Brighton; 50.8226°N 0.1498°W	This terrace is no longer symmetrical but was probably built to be. Numbers 58 and 59 are five storeys high; number 57, former home of Somers Clarke, has its four floors augmented by attic space with dormer windows in its mansard roof. All three have porches with Ionic columns.	
60–66 Regency Square^{[C]}		c. 1818	Brighton; 50.8223°N 0.1499°W	These houses were planned as a symmetrical terrace. The outer two houses on each side (60, 61, 65 and 66) have four storeys, mansard roofs and dormers, and are slightly recessed. Numbers 62 to 64 rise to five storeys and sit below a panelled parapet topped by a slim pediment. Ionic porches enclose round-arched doors with fanlights.	
West Blatchington Windmill		c. 1820	West Blatchington; 50.8466°N 0.1852°W	Pevsner found this structure "eminently curious" and incorrectly dated it to 1724. It is now known to be of 1820s vintage, and was painted by John Constable during that decade. The smock mill's sails sit on top of an L-shaped barn which houses the machinery. Milling stopped in 1907, and it has been open for public visits since 1976.	
Royal Albion Hotel^{[B]}		1826	Brighton; 50.8197°N 0.1373°W	Richard Russell, a Lewes-based doctor whose praise of sea-bathing and "water treatment" helped Brighton's early growth, built his house facing Old Steine in about 1752. Russell House, as it became, was demolished in 1826 when Amon Henry Wilds built the first part of a hotel which has since been extended several times. The four- and five-storey stuccoed façade has columns and pilasters. A fire in 1998 caused severe damage.	
1–18 Oriental Place^{[C]}		1827	Brighton; 50.8230°N 0.1537°W	Amon Henry Wilds started work on this terrace in 1825 in association with landscape gardener Henry Phillips, whose grand plans for gardens and a giant conservatory nearby foundered when money ran out. The stuccoed terrace has a long parapet and pediments.	
19–35 Oriental Place^{[C]}		1827	Brighton; 50.8229°N 0.1533°W	Like its counterpart on the west side of the narrow street, the east side of Oriental Place consists of a long row of houses with a cast-iron balcony spanning the whole terrace at first-floor level. Wilds's signature motif, the ammonite capital, appears at second-floor level on top of large pilasters.	
St Peter's Church		1828	Brighton; 50.8283°N 0.1350°W	The young, little-known Charles Barry won a competition to design a new Anglican church to relieve pressure on St Nicholas' Church and to serve a rapidly growing area of Brighton described as "the entrance to the town". His Gothic Revival proposal beat nearly 80 rival entries, and was completed in 1828. The tower has tall, spindly pinnacles. Somers Clarke added to the nave between 1889 and 1906, and Charles Eamer Kempe provided much stained glasswork. Structural problems and declining attendances threatened redundancy, but in 2009 a church plant was established in the building, improving its viability.	
Western Pavilion^{[C]}		1828	Brighton; 50.8246°N 0.1519°W	Amon Henry Wilds built most of Western Terrace, including the exotic house at its north end: it was his home from 1828. He incorporated Hindoo and Indo-Saracenic elements: the design mimics the Royal Pavilion's onion dome and other features (Pevsner called it the Royal Pavilion's baby brother). The stucco building has a lead roof. The north façade to Western Road has housed a ground-floor shop since 1957.	
131 King's Road		1830	Brighton; 50.8220°N 0.1513°W	Formerly number 1 Regency Square, this was built slightly later than its neighbours and was remodelled as a shop and restaurant in about 1900. It was originally called St Albans House: Amon Henry Wilds built it for the Duke and Duchess of St Albans. A large riding school used to be attached at the rear. The building rises to five storeys, and presents a five-window façade to Regency Square and three towards the sea and King's Road.	
Walls, ramps and stairways on south front of Adelaide Crescent		c. 1830	Hove; 50.8240°N 0.1650°W	These structures were part of the crescent's original design, and were built early in the scheme's life. They were needed because the site sloped downwards from north to south and had to be flattened and artificially raised above the level of the seafront road before the houses could be built. Rusticated stucco walls with balusters enclose the ramps and steps.	
North Gate of the Royal Pavilion^{[C]}		1832	Brighton; 50.8235°N 0.1372°W	This decorative archway stands at the Church Road entrance to the Royal Pavilion's gardens, and was built in the style of the Pavilion in 1832 by William Good—probably with guidance from John Nash, the Pavilion's designer. The stone structure (both Bath and Portland stone are used) supports a copper onion dome. A scalloped ogive arch forms the gateway. Two identical wings adjoining the main structure have octagonal pilasters and Tuscan-style columns which end with oval finials.	
St Andrew's Church		1834	Hove; 50.8286°N 0.1750°W	This had been Hove's parish church since the 12th century. George Basevi rebuilt it from a derelict state in 1834, and retained and updated its Norman style—although the chancel is Early English Gothic-style. All Saints Church became the parish church in 1892.	
St John the Baptist's Church		1835	Kemptown; 50.8194°N 0.1261°W	William Hallett—later the Mayor of Brighton—is not known to have designed any buildings other than this early Roman Catholic church, Brighton's first. The Classical-style stuccoed structure has a large pediment supported by Corinthian columns. John Edward Carew provided a Baroque-style sculpture for the interior.	
Brighton railway station^{[D]}		1841	Brighton; 50.8288°N 0.1411°W	David Mocatta's two-storey stuccoed Italianate station building of September 1841 is partly hidden by H.E. Wallis's road-facing gabled canopy of 1882–83. Wallis also designed the soaring three-bay train shed roofs—597 feet (182 m) long, of iron with some timber framing and glass, and supported on octagonal iron columns. Continuous growth has necessitated many extensions and alterations.	
London Road viaduct		1846	Round Hill; 50.8353°N 0.1421°W	The L&BR's proposed railway route from Brighton to Newhaven had to negotiate the fields of a steep north–south valley. John Urpeth Rastrick's solution was a sharply curving, 1,200-foot (370 m) long, 67-foot (20 m) high viaduct with 27 arches. It has about 10 million red and brown bricks, and is topped by a balustrade with stone balusters. Dense housing now surrounds it.	
7–31 Montpelier Crescent^{[E]}		1847	Montpelier; 50.8294°N 0.1480°W	Amon Henry Wilds started work on this wide, inland-facing development in 1843. It was not treated as a single design: instead, individual villas were designed in stages (probably starting from the centre) and then connected. Pediments, Corinthian pilasters and stucco work give a Regency flavour.	
St Paul's Church^{[F]}		1848	Brighton; 50.8221°N 0.1444°W	Between them, Rev. Henry Michell Wagner and his son Arthur were Vicars of Brighton for most of the 19th century. They used their wealth to found new churches throughout the town, especially in poor areas; six survive, of which St Paul's is the oldest. Richard Cromwell Carpenter started building it in 1846; George Frederick Bodley added the narthex in 1874, and a rood screen. The Decorated Gothic building is of knapped flint with some brick and stonework. Arthur Wagner was the incumbent here for 52 years until his death in 1902.	
1–16 Park Crescent^{[B]}		1854	Round Hill; 50.8326°N 0.1320°W	Local businessman James Ireland laid out a speculative pleasure garden and cricket pitch, the Royal Gardens and Royal New Ground, next to the Lewes Road. The venture failed, and Amon Henry Wilds started work on a high-class horseshoe-shaped set of terraces on the land. The former cricket pitch became its private garden. The western side of the terrace has houses of two and three storeys, each with a three-window range.	
17–24 and 26–32 Park Crescent		1854	Round Hill; 50.8330°N 0.1306°W	The curved north side of Park Crescent has three-storey houses throughout. Number 25 no longer exists: a World War II bomb destroyed 24–26, and they were rebuilt in a matching style as two houses (omitting number 25) in 1983. Features common to each house include stucco walls, slate roofs, three-window ranges, architraves with mouldings, pairs of chimneys and recessed entrance bays demarcated by quoins.	
33–48 Park Crescent^{[C]}		1854	Round Hill; 50.8323°N 0.1303°W	The east side of the terrace matches the west: the houses are treated as individual villas from the front (the Lewes Road façade), but to the rear they appear to form one continuous structure, with a flat wall facing the garden. They took several years to complete. Three sash windows, recessed entrances, bracketed eaves, stucco walls and slate roofs are the standard features.	
1–19 Adelaide Crescent^{[G]}		1860	Hove; 50.8245°N 0.1630°W	Sir Isaac Goldsmid, a banker and philanthropist, asked Decimus Burton to design a crescent of houses on his recently acquired seafront land in 1830. Plans were exhibited in 1831, and numbers 1–8 were complete by 1834, but the scheme foundered and the Renaissance Revival designs were simplified and eventually executed between 1850 and 1860.	
20–38 Adelaide Crescent^{[G]}		1860	Hove; 50.8248°N 0.1650°W	The delays caused Goldsmid to reconsider his proposal, and the crescent was fashioned into an open-ended square instead. Its west side, built between 1850 and 1860, is slightly more austere than its eastern counterpart and has no sea-facing terrace to set off its south end. The designs of its porches are also different.	
Boiler and Engine House at British Engineerium (formerly Goldstone Pumping Station)		1866	West Blatchington; 50.8442°N 0.1758°W	The Brighton, Hove and Preston Constant Service Waterworks Company bought 3.5 acres (1.4 ha) of land at Goldstone Bottom in 1862, and built a pumping station and associated structures four years later. The beam engine supplied 150,000 imperial gallons (680,000 L) per hour. The multicoloured brick structure went out of use in the 1940s and was saved from demolition in 1971. The building has three bays; the end pair are two-storey and have gabled roofs.	
Chimney at British Engineerium (formerly Goldstone Pumping Station)		1866	West Blatchington; 50.8441°N 0.1759°W	This elaborate structure is now, like the former engine house which stands about 6.5 feet (2.0 m) to the north, part of the British Engineerium museum complex (opened in 1976). The chimney tapers from a red-brick plinth and rises to 95 feet (29 m). Polychromatic brickwork is again used, and intricate external details include recessed, round-arched sections on each face, an entablature and a cornice with decorative moulding.	
Middle Street Synagogue^{[H]}		1874	The Lanes; 50.8211°N 0.1428°W	In 1874, Thomas Lainson won a competition to design a new, larger synagogue for Brighton—the fourth in the town since Emmanuel Hyam Cohen established one in 1792. Pale yellow and brown local brick around an iron frame, stone dressings, multicoloured tiling, columns of sandstone, a pediment-style gable above a substantial cornice and a rose window combine to give an opulent Italian Renaissance/Neo-Byzantine Revival appearance.	
St Martin's Church		1875	Round Hill; 50.8333°N 0.1284°W	Designed by George Somers Leigh Clarke for Rev. Arthur Wagner as a memorial to his father, this 1,500-capacity church served a dense residential area and the soldiers of Preston Barracks—hence the dedication to the patron saint of soldiers, Martin of Tours. The large yellow- and red-brick Early English-style church has only a bellcote; a tower was planned but never built.	
St Mary the Virgin Church		1879	Kemptown; 50.8203°N 0.1294°W	Sussex church historian Robert Elleray described the interior of the present church as "one of the best in Sussex". It replaced Amon Henry Wilds's Temple of Nemesis-mimicking Neoclassical structure of 1826, which collapsed during renovations in 1876. Sir William Emerson's only English church—he worked mostly in India—combines the Early English and French Gothic styles.	
St Barnabas Church		1883	Hove; 50.8346°N 0.1774°W	John Loughborough Pearson's knapped flint and brick Early English Gothic-style Anglican church was built at the Vicar of Brighton's request to serve a rapidly growing residential area in Hove. Features include a many-sided apse, a Lady chapel and a flèche.	
33 Palmeira Mansions		1884	Hove; 50.8270°N 0.1638°W	H.J. Lanchester's twin blocks of four-storey Italianate houses form the north side of Palmeira Square, named after Sir Isaac Goldsmid (Baron Palmeira). Number 33 is remarkable for its extremely ornate interior: marble inlaid walls, stained glass, fittings in an array of styles (Adamesque, Rococo, Moorish and others) and large areas of lincrusta, all added by ink-company owner A.W. Mason after he bought it in 1889.	
Madeira Terrace, Madeira Walk, Madeira Lift, and Madeira Shelter Hall		1890	East Cliff; 50.8187°N 0.1297°W	Madeira Terrace is a 2,837-by-25-foot (864.7 m × 7.6 m) covered walkway at the foot of East Cliff. The lift opened on 24 May 1890 and goes from the terrace up to Marine Parade. Philip Lockwood was responsible for the whole structure, a brick and iron complex which was finished in 1897. Decorations include keystones depicting Neptune and Venus, dragons, a pagoda-style roof to the lift and a weather vane depicting a dolphin. The terrace was identified by the Victorian Society as one of the top ten at-risk Victorian and Edwardian buildings in 2015, and was upgraded from Grade II listed status in 2020.	
St Peter's Church		1890	West Blatchington; 50.8472°N 0.1851°W	Originally an 11th-century parish church for a downland village which vanished, this was rebuilt in 1890 by Somers Clarke, a local architect, after a resident left money in her will. Saxon and Norman remains were incorporated into the new building. Another extension was built in 1961–62 after West Blatchington became another housing estate.	
52–58 Middle Street (Former Brighton Hippodrome)		1897	The Lanes; 50.8218°N 0.1427°W	This stuccoed building, with a Rococo and Middle Eastern-style interior, began as an ice rink, but in 1901 Frank Matcham converted it into a variety theatre and circus. The Rolling Stones and Beatles played there in the same month in 1964. Soon afterwards the building became a television studio then a bingo hall, and a flat floor was inserted; but the original U-shaped auditorium is still visible.	
Palace Pier		1899	Brighton; 50.8154°N 0.1371°W	The only surviving pier in Brighton, this 1,760-foot (540 m) structure replaced the wrecked Chain Pier. R. St George Moore's design was executed by builder Arthur Mayoh, and took nearly eight years to complete: work started in November 1891. Features include various pavilions, kiosks with pagoda-style roofs and a funfair.	
St Joseph's Church^{[I]}		1906	Elm Grove; 50.8320°N 0.1279°W	Young architect William Kedo Broder submitted elaborate plans for this Roman Catholic church, endowed by a widow who wanted a permanent building to replace the area's 1860s mission chapel. He built the chancel and nave in 1880, but his death in a railway accident in 1881 led to his ideas being reinterpreted and scaled back by other architects. Joseph S. Hansom (1881–83) and Frederick Walters (1906) finished the church, which is a commanding rag-stone and Bath Stone Early English-style structure.	
Embassy Court		1935	Brighton; 50.8230°N 0.1564°W	This seafront landmark replaced one of the last remaining private houses on King's Road, which was demolished in 1935. Wells Coates, whose Modernist Isokon building of 1934 aroused fascination in London, adopted a similar theme on a larger scale in Brighton: the eleven-storey block, with strong horizontal lines enhanced by the restored pale cream render on the exterior, has 72 flats. Its proximity to the Regency architecture of Brunswick Town was controversial.	
Saltdean Lido		1938	Saltdean; 50.8016°N 0.0421°W	Designed by Richard W.H. Jones in 1937–38, this innovative lido was listed at Grade II in 1987 and upgraded to Grade II* on 18 March 2011. Jones also designed the nearby Ocean Hotel in a similar Art Deco/Moderne style. Julie Burchill called it "the most beautiful building in Britain", but it closed and reopened several times and was threatened with demolition for flats in 2010. After refurbishment it reopened again in 2017.	
Pevensey Building		1962	University of Sussex; 50.8653°N 0.0869°W	Sir Basil Spence, designer of most of the University of Sussex's buildings, used the Stoa of Attalos as his inspiration for this early building, used for mathematics and physics. The eleven-bay, three-storey brick and concrete-arched structure has a recessed ground floor, forming an undercroft. The windows are timber-framed.	
Chichester Building		1965	University of Sussex; 50.8658°N 0.0869°W	Started by Spence in 1962, the Chichester Building is used by the chemistry department. The materials are similar to those of the Pevensey Building, but the façade has ten bays and a prominent entrance staircase. The attached lecture theatre is a plain, nearly circular drum.	
Meeting House^{[J]}		1966	University of Sussex; 50.8650°N 0.0880°W	A wall of coloured glass, enveloped in a skin of concrete blocks with large gaps, provides light to the interior of Spence's circular non-denominational religious building, which is of brick and concrete and has a flattened cone-shaped copper roof. The design is a simplified version of his original proposal, which the council's planners rejected. It was registered for marriages in January 1967.	
Engineering and Applied Sciences Building		1966	University of Sussex; 50.8663°N 0.0874°W	Construction of this block, with an attached workshop now converted into another lecture hall, started in 1964. The three-storey, flat-roofed, brick and concrete structure has an 11-bay façade and an arcade on the south side.	
Arts Building A and B^{[K]}		1966	University of Sussex; 50.8664°N 0.0895°W	The entrance to Arts A is defined by two tall concrete pillars, and brick and concrete are the main building materials. A courtyard with brick cloisters and a sunken pool sits between Arts A and B. The windows are timber-framed.	
Attenborough Centre for the Creative Arts^{[L]}		1969	University of Sussex; 50.8646°N 0.0899°W	The Gardner Arts Centre closed in 2007 when money ran out, but it reopened as the Attenborough Centre for the Creative Arts. The Gulbenkian Foundation helped to fund its construction, which started in 1966. Spence's design consisted of three windowless red-brick rings; the innermost ring formed an auditorium.	
University of Sussex Library		1971	University of Sussex; 50.8653°N 0.0901°W	Work started in 1962, but Spence did not complete this building until nine years later. An extension was added in 1997. A concrete staircase (left of the centre) leads to the entrance, recessed behind projecting brickwork which forms a "gateway". Three buttresses project from the 15-bay façade.	

== See also ==
- Buildings and architecture of Brighton and Hove
- List of conservation areas in Brighton and Hove
