= Portslade Manor =

Former manor house in East Sussex, UK

Coordinates: 50.8432°N 0.2181°W

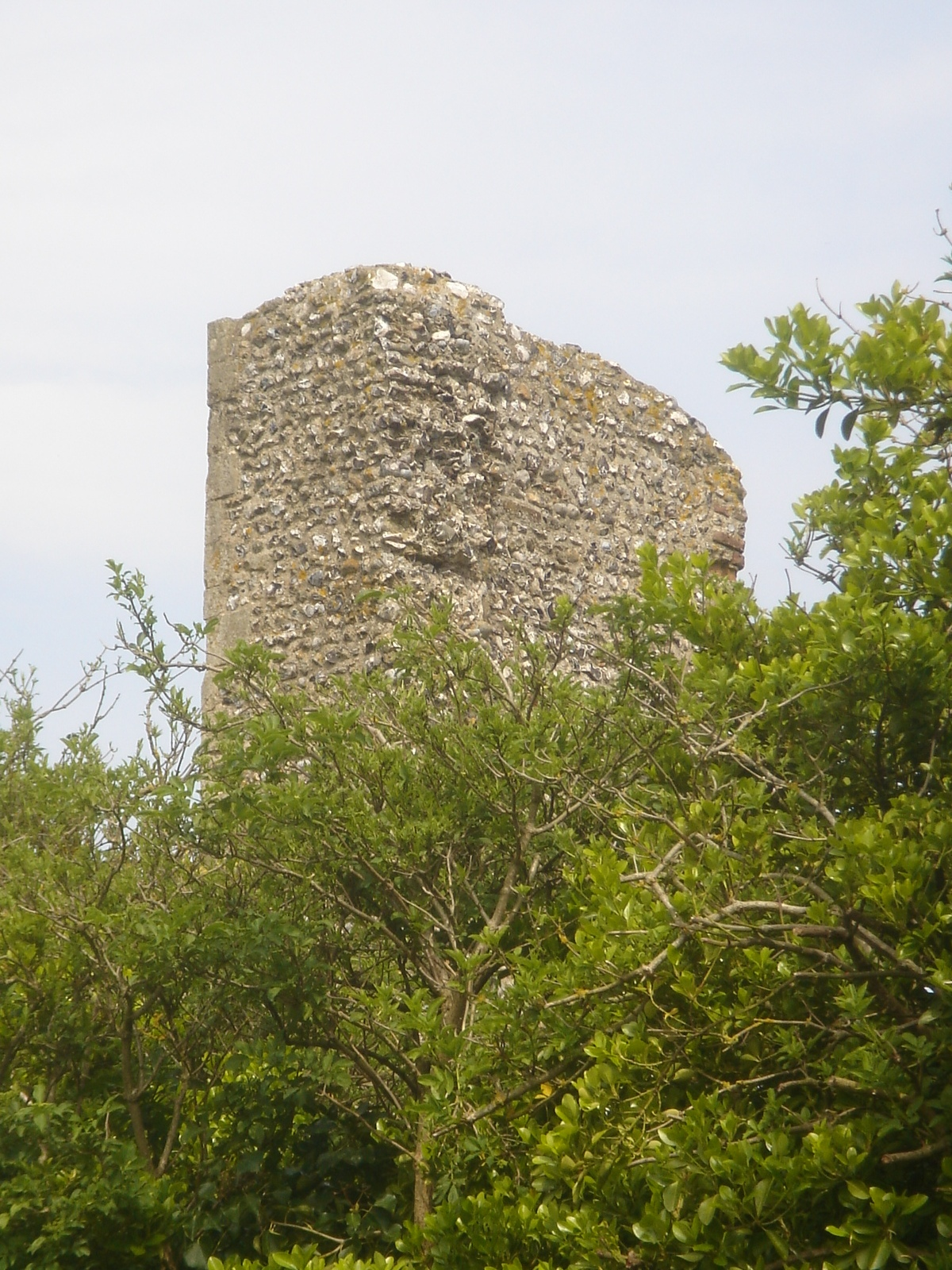
The remains of the old manor house

Portslade Old Manor is one of the very few examples of Norman manor houses that still exist in England. It has been deemed a Scheduled Ancient Monument, and a Grade II* listed building.

In the Domesday Book there are two references to Portslade:

"Oswald holds half a hide in Portslade he held it before 1066. It did not pay tax, he could go where he would with the land, One villager, value 6s".

"Albert held half a hide in Portslade. It did not pay tax. One villager with half plough. The value is and was 6s."

In 1312, the Lord of the manor of Portslade, John de Warenne, 7th Earl of Surrey, was granted a charter by King Edward II to hold a Fair at Portslade annually on 6 December, the Feast Day of Saint Nicolas.

Portslade Manor House was in use until 1807 when the new manor house was built. The old house was then used as an almshouse for the poor. In the Victorian era it was partially demolished, to provide building material for a garden folly in the new manor grounds.

In 2019 Fresh Start Portslade was granted a National Lottery Grant to improve access and visibility of Portslade's Norman Manor house, communicate its historic importance, and explore possible solutions for its longer-term sustainability.

== See also ==
- Grade II* listed buildings in Brighton and Hove
