= Attenborough Centre for the Creative Arts =

Arts centre in Brighton, England

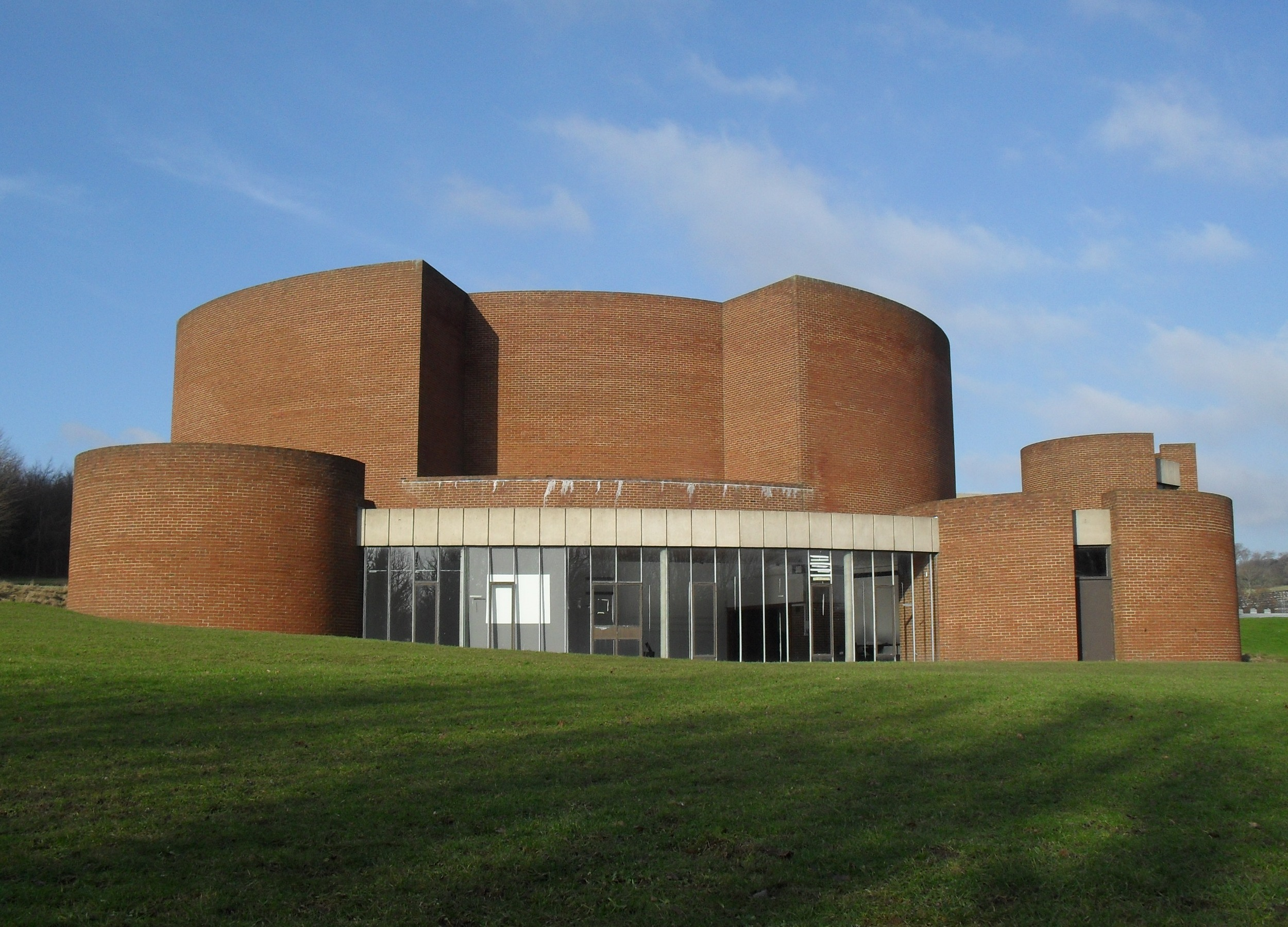
- The building in 2010.
- Interactive map of Attenborough Centre for the Creative Arts
- Former names: Gardner Arts Centre
- Location: University of Sussex, Falmer, Brighton and Hove, UK
- Coordinates: 50.8646°N 0.0899°W
- Capacity: 350 (seated) / 480 (standing)
- Type: Arts centre
- Events: Performance, dance, live art, film, music

Construction
- Opened: 1969

Website
- attenboroughcentre.com

The Attenborough Centre for the Creative Arts (ACCA), previously the Gardner Arts Centre, is an arts centre, part of the University of Sussex at Falmer, Brighton and Hove, UK. Its public programme includes performance, dance, live art, film, music, discussion and debate. The building is mid-century modern Grade II* listed, designed by Basil Spence. The venue's name is in commemoration of the University's former Chancellor, the late actor, director and producer, Richard Attenborough. It is also a memorial to Attenborough's daughter Jane, a Sussex alumnus, who died in the 2004 Indian Ocean earthquake and tsunami.

== History ==
The Calouste Gulbenkian Foundation helped to fund its construction, which started in 1966. It opened for use in November 1969.

It operated as the Gardner Arts Centre from 1969 to 2007, then closed, was refurbished and reopened in 2016 as the Attenborough Centre for the Creative Arts. It is Britain’s first campus-based university arts centre.

It closed at the end of the spring 2007 season, when money ran out. The building was leased from the University of Sussex and needed about £14 million of improvements. Also, in 2006 Brighton and Hove City Council withdrew its annual £30,000 grant in favour of other city centre arts groups; and in 2007 the Arts Council stopped its funding. It was subsequently used as a storage space.

Refurbishment addressed the building's previous shortcomings for contemporary use, making it an interdisciplinary space, in the following ways: the auditorium is flexible with end-stage, theatre in the round and thrust stage arrangement seating; rehearsal studios; specialist lighting, sound and audio-visual equipment; a gallery; rehearsal studios; and a new café and bar. The building exterior remained the same.

It reopened to the public in 2016, renamed the Attenborough Centre for the Creative Arts.

== The building ==
The building is mid-century modern Grade II* listed, designed by Basil Spence in the early 1960s. Spence's design consisted of three windowless red-brick rings; the innermost ring formed an auditorium. The concentric circles relate to the unity of all the arts.

Its capacity is 350 (seated) or 480 (standing). The main studio section of the BBC reality TV show Interior Design Masters has been filmed there from at least season 4 onwards.

== See also ==
- Grade II* listed buildings in Brighton and Hove
