= Madeira Terrace =

Cast iron seafront complex in Brighton, UK

Coordinates: 50.8187°N 0.1297°W

Madeira Terrace, Madeira Walk, Madeira Lift, and Madeira Shelter Hall are an 865 m long, Victorian cast iron stretch of seafront arches and walkway, with integral former shelter hall and a 3-stage lift tower, on Madeira Drive in Brighton, UK. The complex was built between 1890 and 1897 and designed by the Brighton Borough Surveyor, Philip C. Lockwood. The various structures have a common design style and colour scheme, and form a unified whole. Madeira Terrace, Madeira Walk, the lift tower and related buildings are listed Grade II* on the National Heritage List for England, having been upgraded in 2020.

By 2021 the terrace was in a state of disrepair and at risk of collapse. The entire length of Madeira Walk, the upper deck and some of the staircases have been closed to the public since 2012. In October 2024, Historic England agreed to provide £750,000 to begin the restoration of the arches but the project was expected to total in the multimillion-pound range.

== Madeira Terrace and Madeira Walk ==
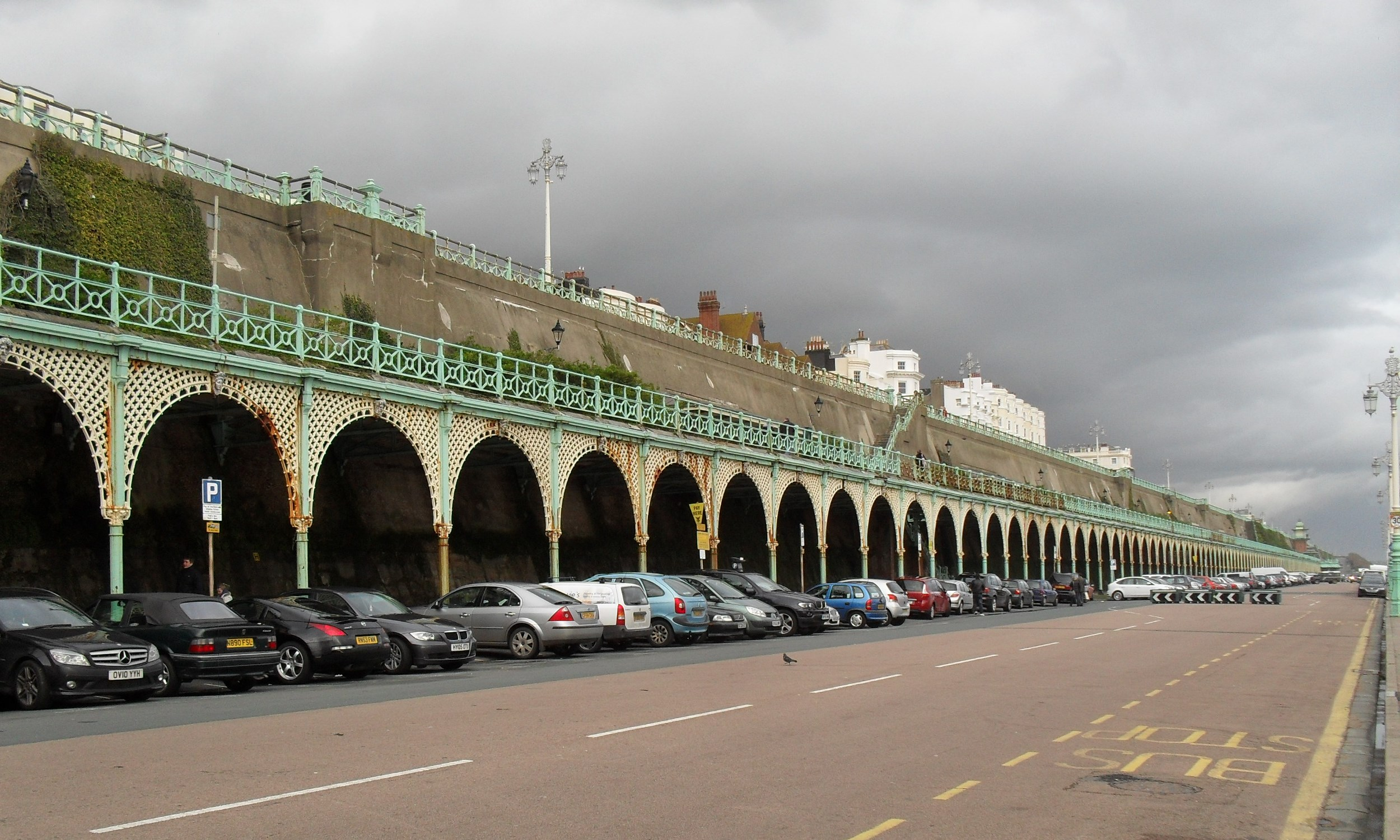
Madeira Terrace (2011).

Madeira Terrace is a 2,837-by-25-foot (864.7 m × 7.6 m) covered walkway at the foot of East Cliff, stretching from the Colonnade, Madeira Drive to the west, to Duke's Mound in the east. It faces south toward the sea and stands against the cliff behind.

The terrace and walkway are decorated with cast iron balustrades and there are 151 separate arches. Decorations include keystones depicting possibly Neptune, Venus, and dragons. The walkway has four shelters along its length, each with a roof. There are also numerous cast-iron benches.

"There are also five sets of steps along the length of the complex which give access to all three levels. At the western extent there is a ramp from the beach level up to the promenade. The ramp has commercial units within its brick arches. The last cast-iron arch to the western side is also brick-faced". Later in the twentieth century a former public toilet was added, half in-filling the preceding four arches.

The Brighton Borough Surveyor Philip C. Lockwood (1821–1908) was responsible for the whole structure, which was finished in 1897. It was constructed in three phases from 1890 and is one of the longest cast-iron structures in the world, intended to "facilitate the act of promenading."

"The critical part of the Terrace's structure are the massive north south cast iron trusses that are supported by the retaining wall and the cast iron columns along the front elevation." The wall was constructed in 1830 to hold back the unstable cliff face and to enable construction of the A259 Marine Parade road. "These trusses are very dependant on the fixity provided by the wall and to ensure this fixity they are buried deep into the wall."

By 2021 the terrace was in a state of disrepair and at risk of collapse. The entire length of Madeira Walk and the upper deck, and some of the staircases, has been closed to the public since 2012. Only 5 of the 133 trusses have any significant fractures. In 2015 it was identified by The Victorian Society as one of the top ten at-risk Victorian and Edwardian buildings. The Save Madeira Terrace crowdfunding campaign raised £466,000 to restore 3 arches. In 2020 Brighton and Hove City Council had secured funds to restore an as yet unspecified series of 30 of the arches.

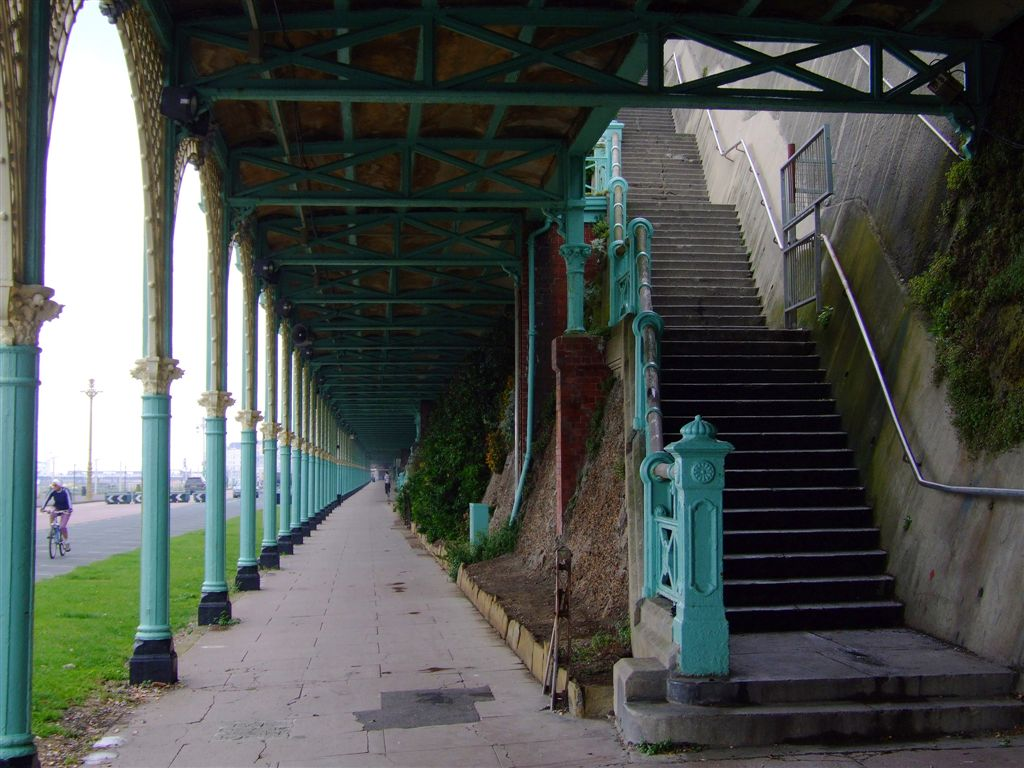
Madeira Walk and a staircase (2008).

== Madeira Lift ==
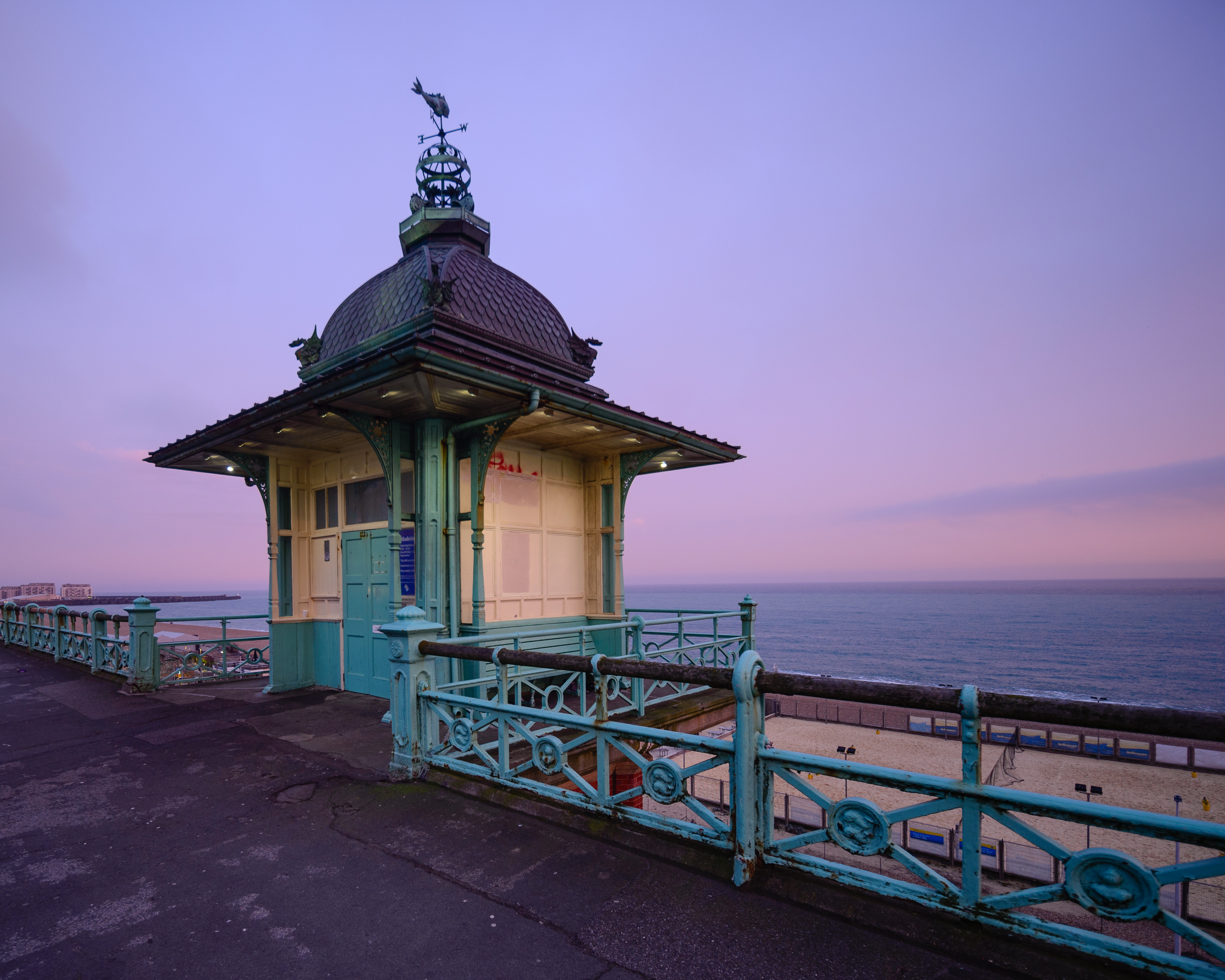
Madeira Lift from Marine Parade (2018).

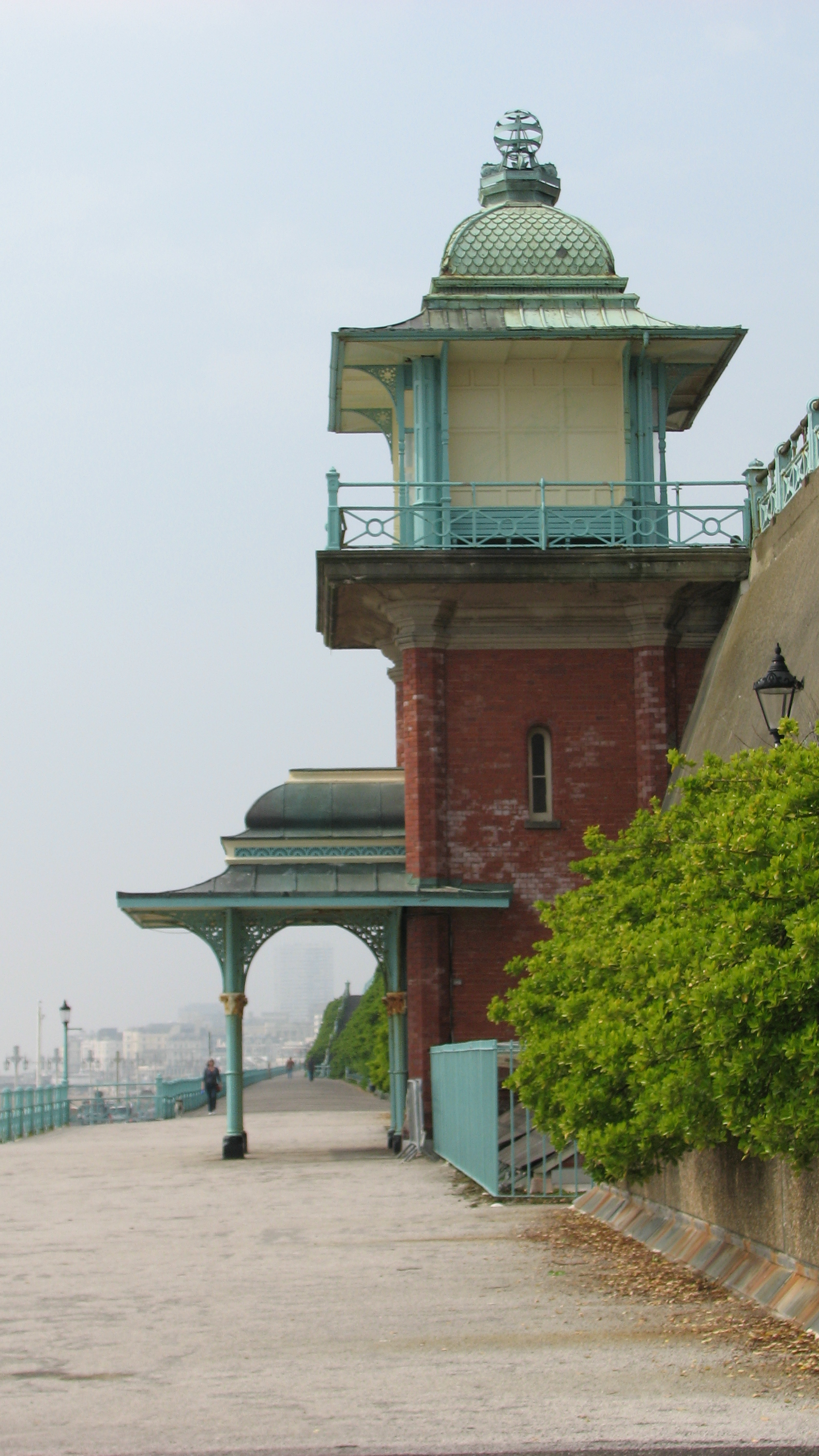
Madeira Lift with the exit onto the terrace walkway (2009).

Toward the east of the terrace, in Kemptown, Madeira Lift is an ornamental Victorian lift or elevator which opened on 24 May 1890. The 3-stage lift tower links Madeira Drive at beach level, to Marine Parade above, with an intermediate stop at the terrace walkway. At its base it opens into Madeira Shelter Hall, which is currently occupied by the Concorde 2 music venue.

The lift tower has a pagoda-style roof and a weather vane depicting a dolphin. The top stage of the lift tower originally had a square-faced, projecting clock, but this is no longer in place. The top section is surrounded to the east, west and south by a square platform with a railing. The lift has sliding, metal grille-type doors and is timber-lined and functional.

The lift was closed to the public in July 2007, and major work was carried out on the lift mechanisms and shaft. It reopened in April 2009. Later, it was closed again and its exterior at marine Parade restored, reopening in 2013.

The lift previously operated without the intermediate stop, throughout the summer—closing on the last weekend of September each year. It is operated by Concorde 2 on behalf of Brighton and Hove City Council. As of 2023, it is now closed indefinitely pending future repairs to the shaft of the lift.

Thieves stripped various shelters and the roof of the lift of over 10 tonnes of lead and copper in December 2019.

== Madeira Shelter Hall ==
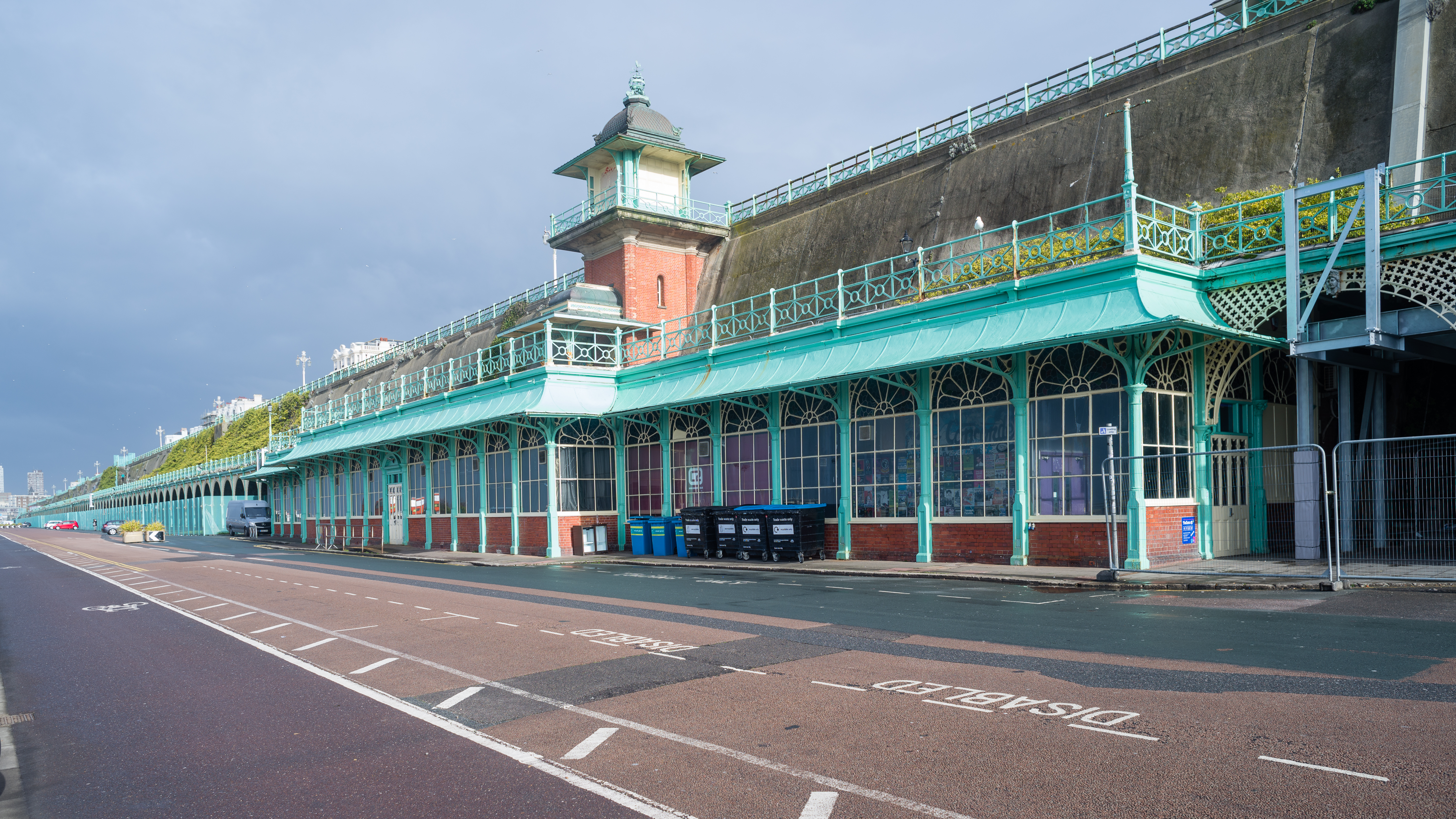
Madeira Shelter Hall (now Concorde 2) and related buildings (2018).

Madeira Shelter Hall, also known as Eastern Shelter Hall, is the single-storey shelter hall for the lift. "It has a projecting 11-window centre bay, with recessed wings of seven bays to either side." In the 1800s it was also tea rooms. Later it was a bikers' cafe in the 1960s; an amusement arcade in the 1970s; opening as the Concorde 2 on New Year's Eve 1999—a 600-capacity music venue that remains in use.

== Gallery ==
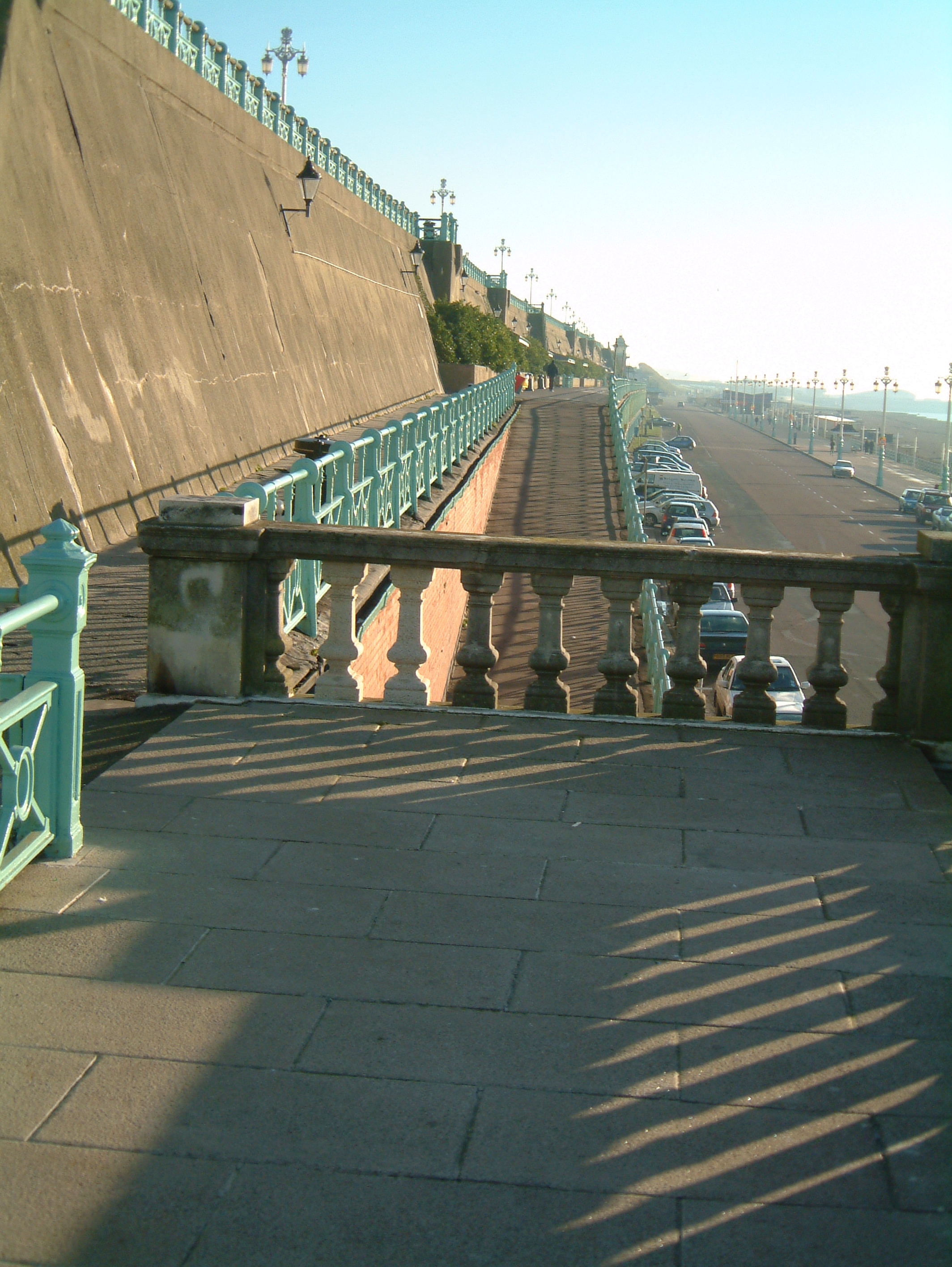
The ramp at the west end (2002).

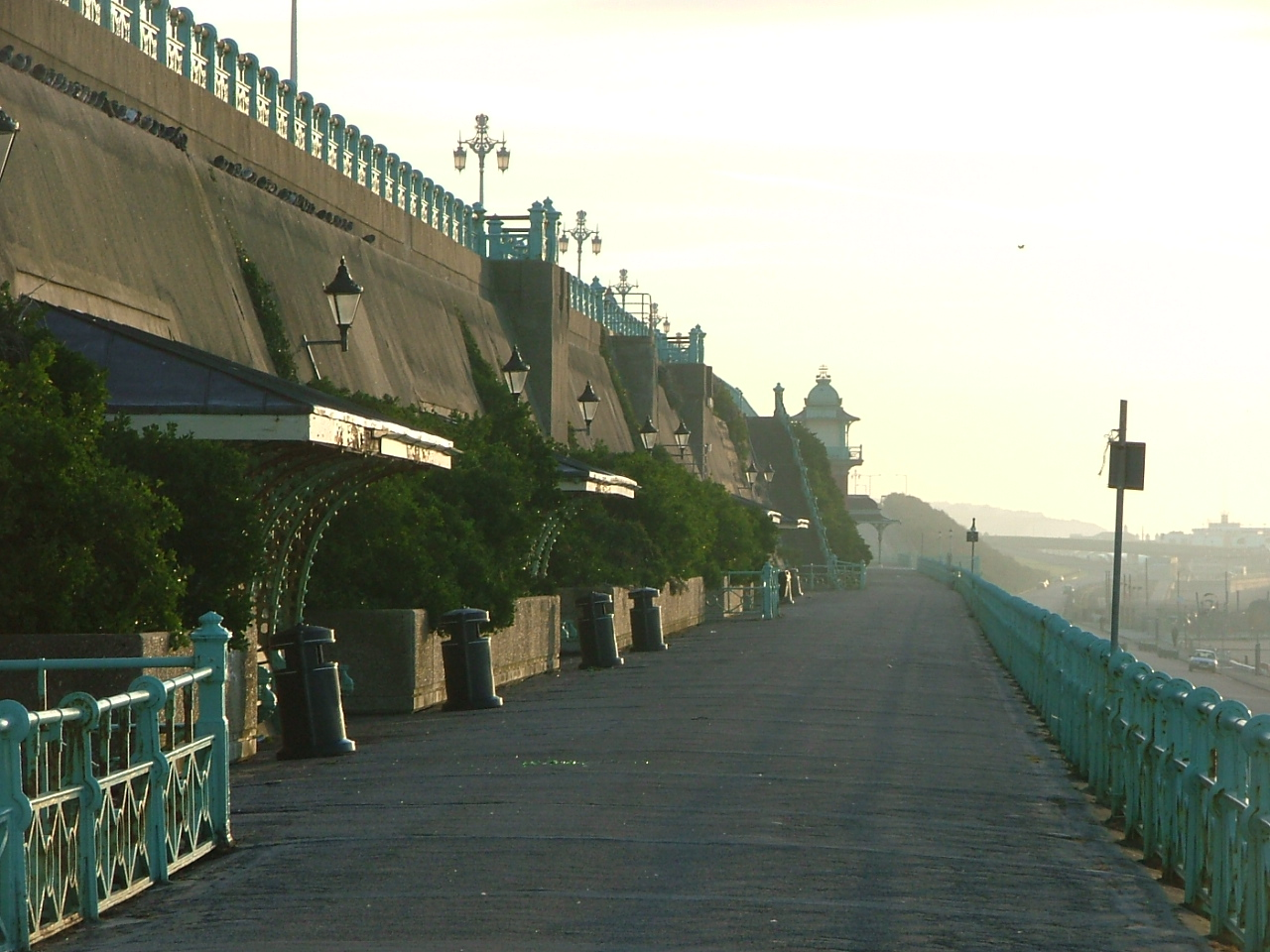
The walkway and shelters (2005).

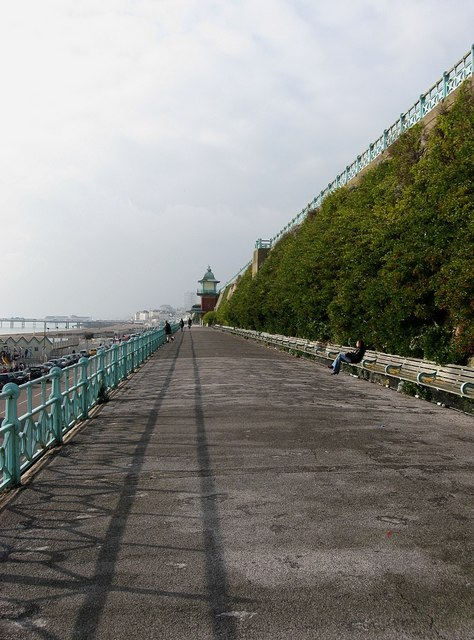
The east end of the walkway (2009).

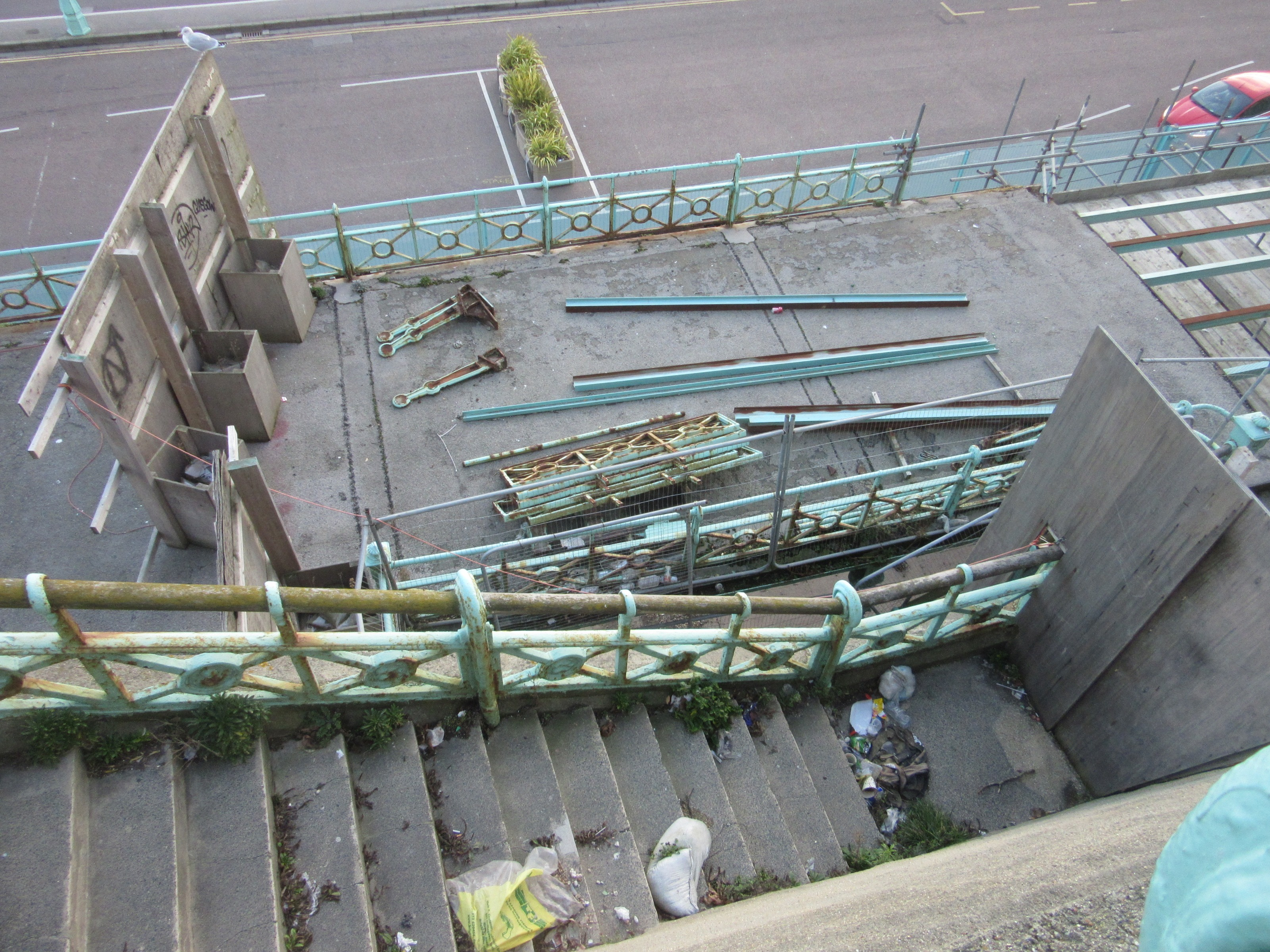
A section of the walkway and a staircase (2016).

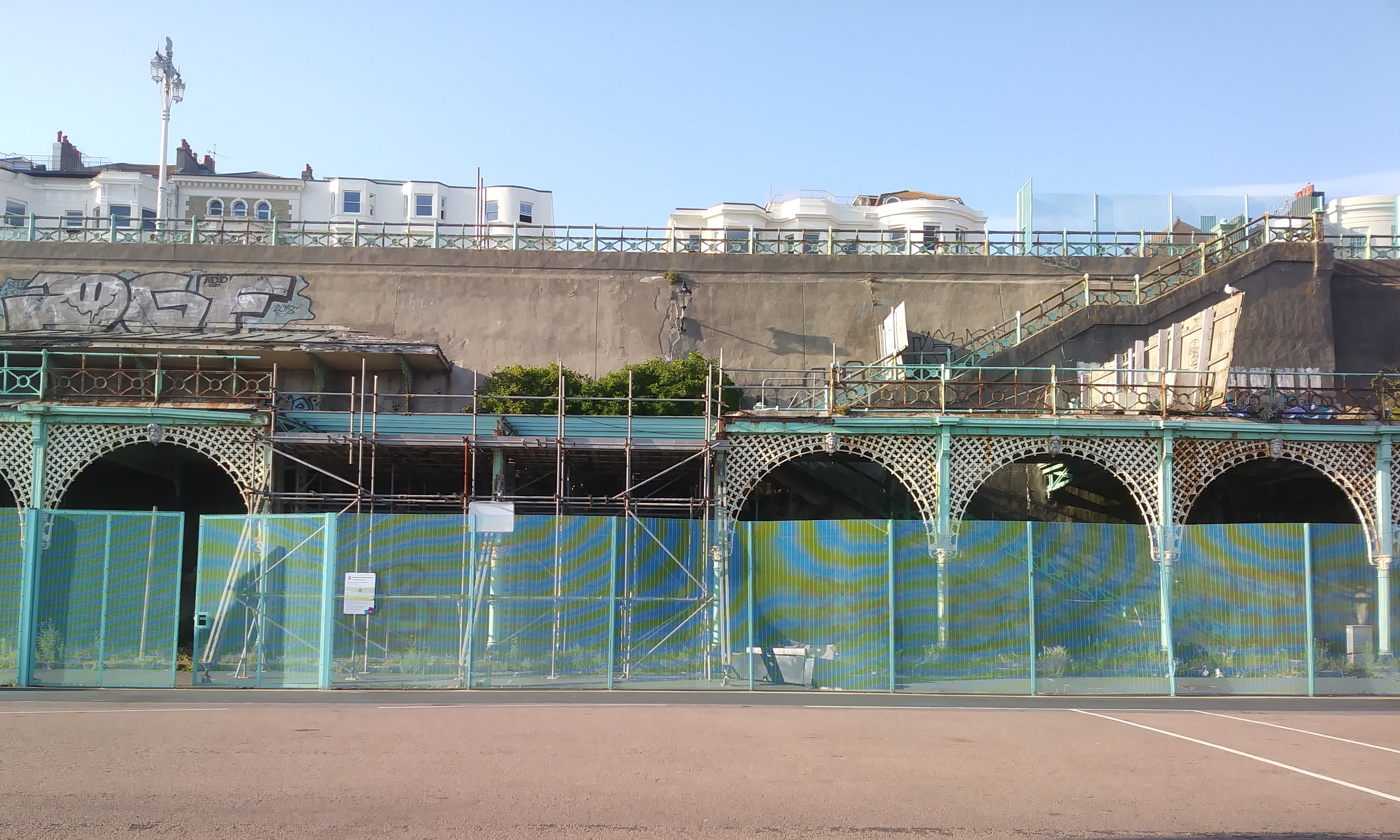
Madeira Terrace (2019).

== See also ==
- Grade II* listed buildings in Brighton and Hove
- List of conservation areas in Brighton and Hove

== Bibliography ==
- Antram, Nicholas; Morrice, Richard (2008). Brighton and Hove. Pevsner Architectural Guides. London: Yale University Press. ISBN 978-0-300-12661-7.
- Collis, Rose (2010). The New Encyclopaedia of Brighton. (based on the original by Tim Carder) (1st ed.). Brighton: Brighton & Hove Libraries. ISBN 978-0-9564664-0-2.
