= Hillside, Brighton and Hove =

House in Brighton and Hove, England

Coordinates: 50.8070°N 0.0596°W

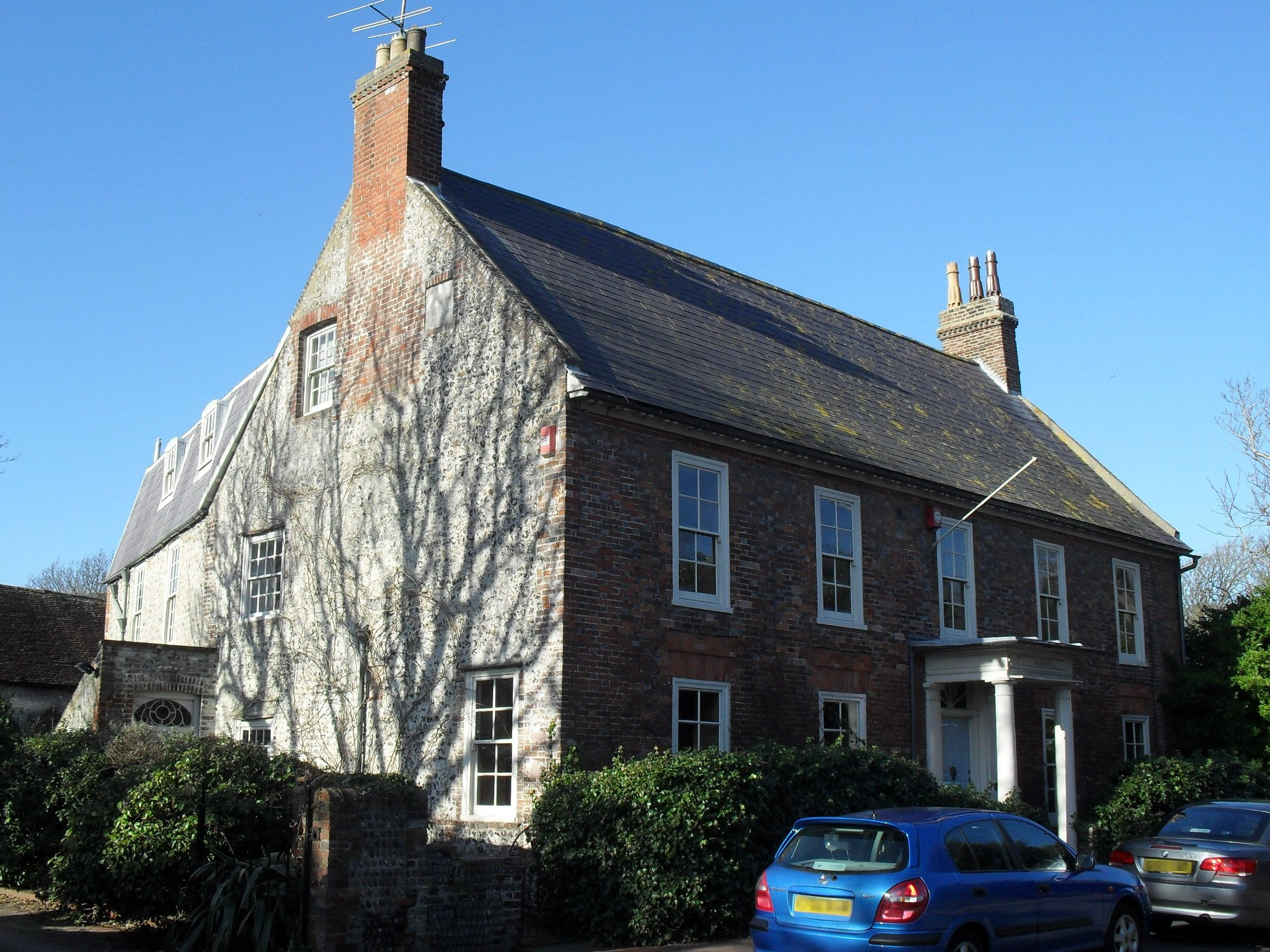
The Grade II* listed house at Hillside.

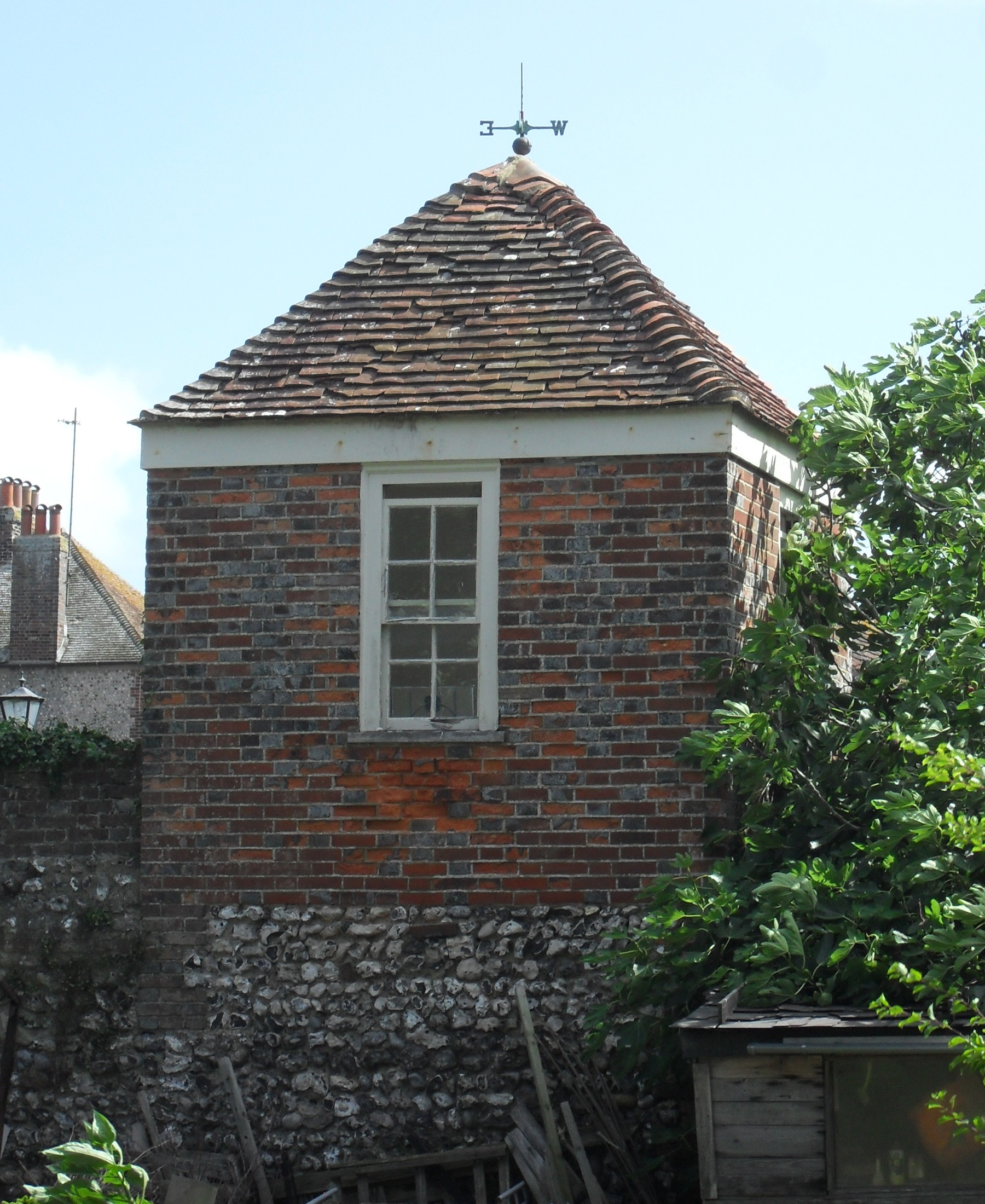
The gazebo at Hillside.

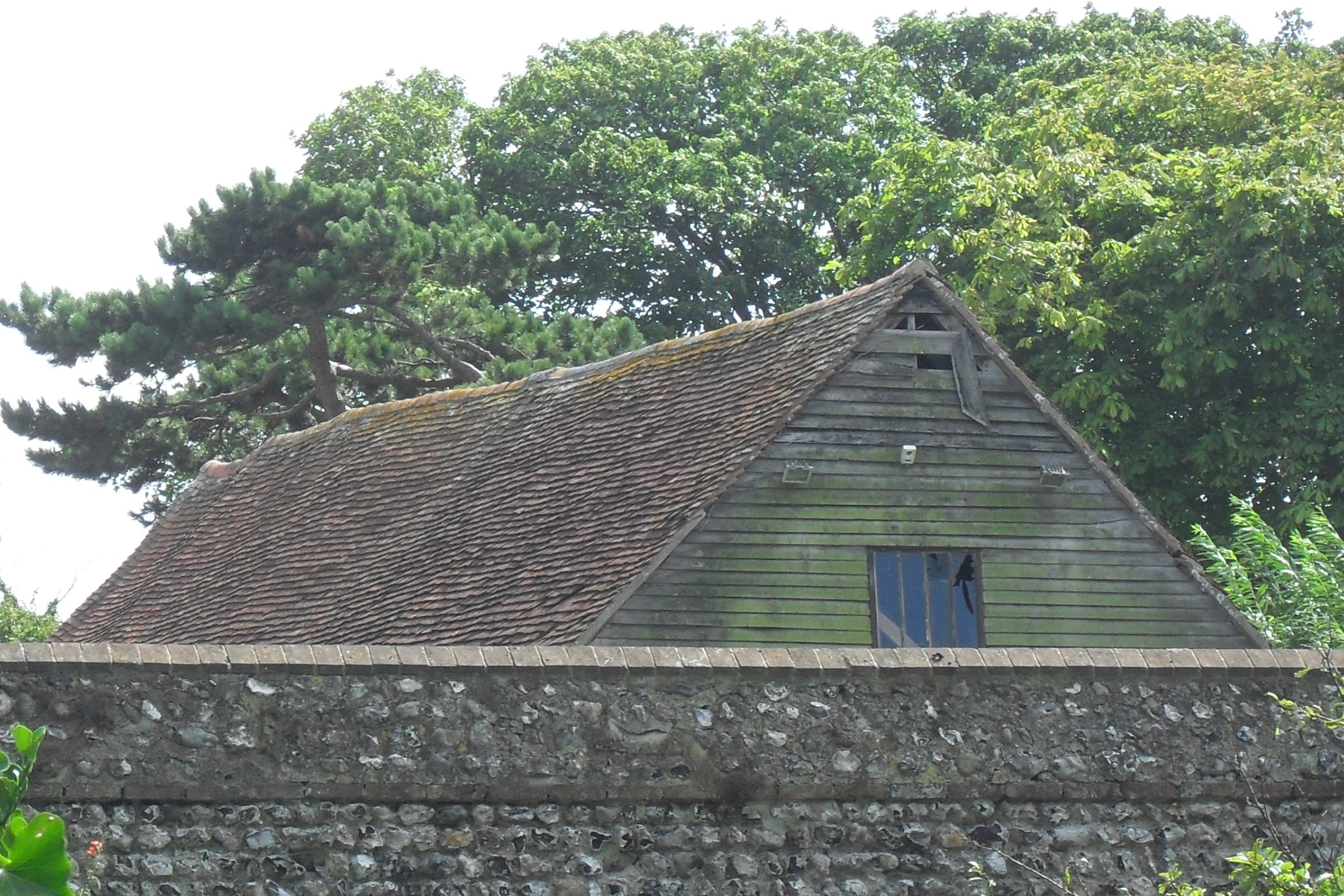
The Grade II listed barn at Hillside.

Hillside is an 18th-century Grade II* listed building in Rottingdean, in the city of Brighton and Hove. The house contains a gazebo listed for its special architectural or historic interest, and also contains a Grade II listed barn.

== History ==
Hillside was built in 1724 as a farmhouse for West Side farm in Rottingdean. It has an 18th-century red and grey brick facade. In 1822, a gazebo was built in the garden, looking out onto Falmer Road; the gazebo was listed as a building of special architectural or historic interest in 1952. The property also contains a 17th-century barn, which became a Grade II listed building in 1973. The barn neighbours Kipling's Garden, and in 2013, developers proposed turning the barn into a house. In 1894, the building is listed as being owned by a Colonel A.M. Phillips.

All of the Hillside buildings are part of the Rottingdean Conservation Area since its creation in 1970.
