= Ovingdean Rectory =

Clergy house in Ovingdean, East Sussex, England

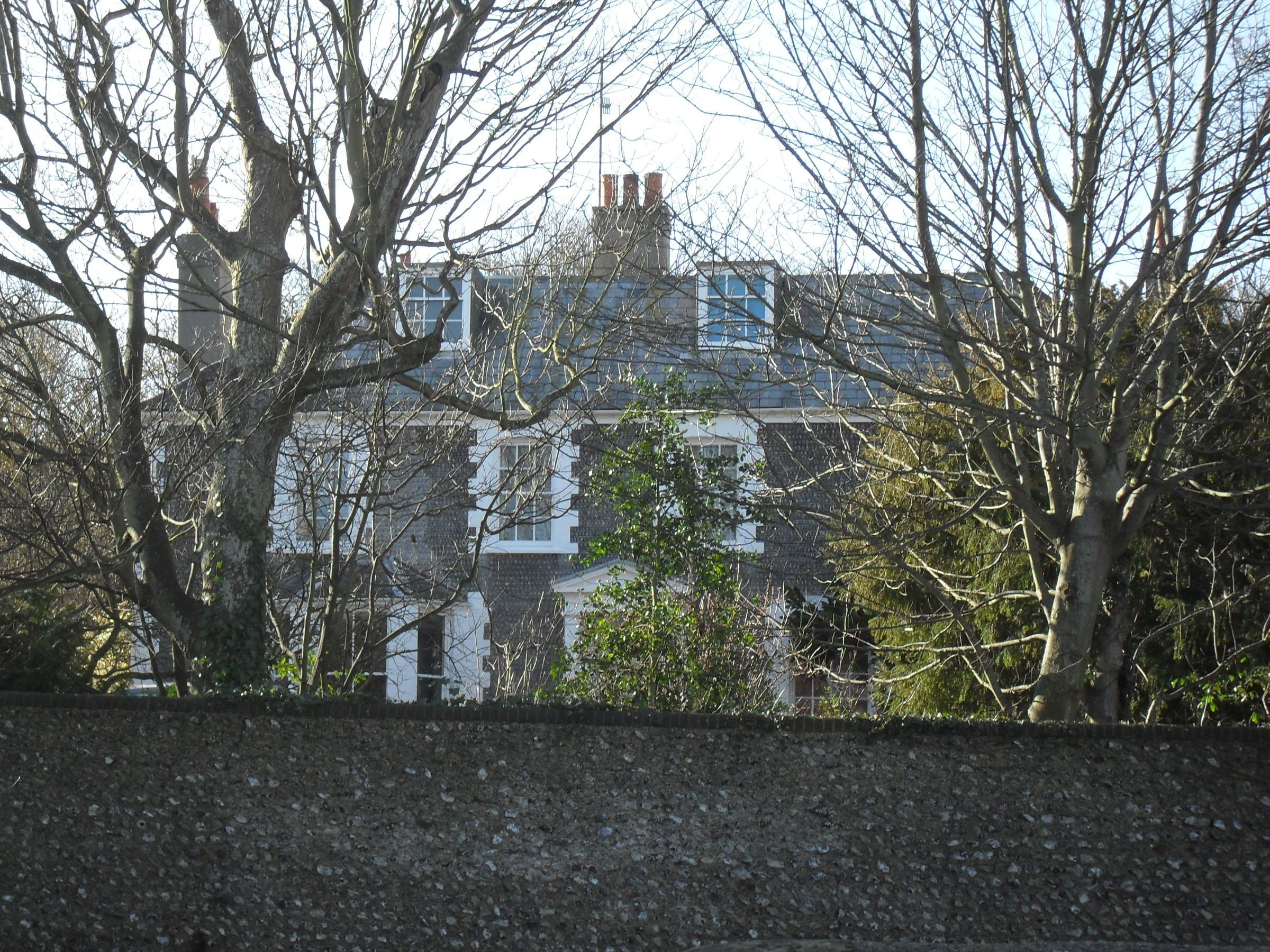
Ovingdean Rectory

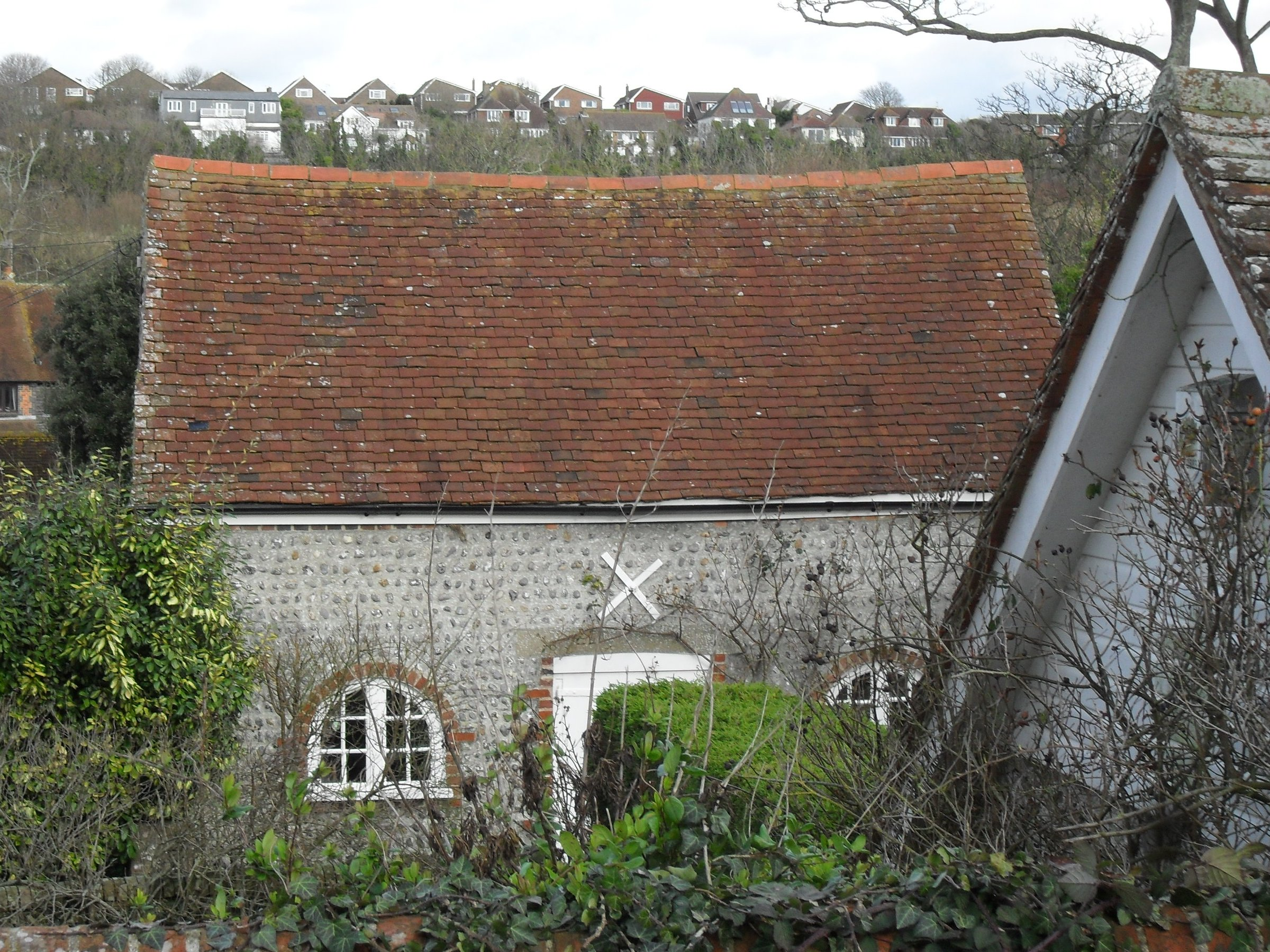
Coach house at Ovingdean Rectory

Ovingdean Rectory is a clergy house at Ovingdean, East Sussex, England. The building was built from 1804 to 1807, replacing an earlier rectory described as "a mean, thatched parsonage-house" in a letter to Sir William Burrell There are mathematical tiles on the southern and western exterior. It is adjacent to St Wulfran's Church.

It is listed Grade II* on the National Heritage List for England. The coach house to the rectory is listed Grade II.
