= Southdown House =

Listed building in Patcham, Brighton and Hove

Coordinates: 50.863719°N 0.151218°W

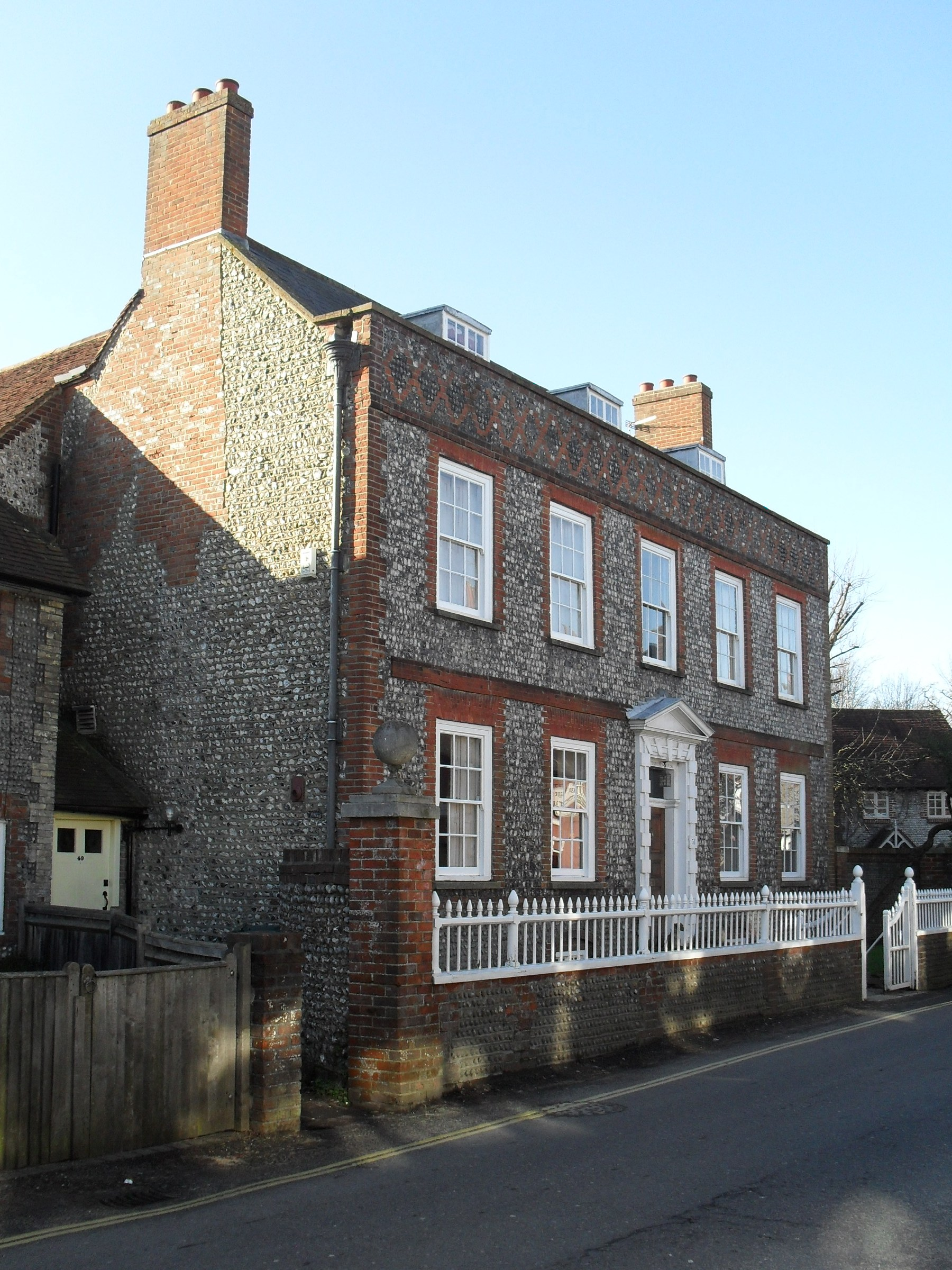
Southdown House in 2009.

Southdown House is a Grade II* listed building in Patcham, Brighton and Hove, England. It is a Georgian house made out of brick and flint, and is now situated at 51 Old London Road. (Note: Formerly London Road.)

== History ==
The exact date of the construction of Southdown House is unknown, however it is believed to have been built in the early eighteenth century, in a cluster of thirteen buildings in Patcham. The house is in the largest cluster of eighteenth century buildings in Brighton and Hove. The two-storey house was built out of brick and flint, and contains five bays. Originally, the house had adjacent stables, which were converted into a house in the twentieth century; that building is now a Grade II listed building. In 1906, the house is recorded as being owned by a Major Howard Vyse Welch, who was a judge at that year's Sussex County Show, and fought in the East Surrey Regiment during the First World War. The house was later owned by a man named Eric Poore, who died in 1953; at the time, the estate was valued at £30,104. The house became a Grade II* listed building in 1952, and a late nineteenth or early twentieth century lamppost outside the property was listed as a Grade II listed building in 1999.
