= St. Bartholomew's Church =

St. Bartholomew's Church, or St Bart's, may refer to:

== Churches ==
=== Australia ===
- St Bartholomew's Church, Burnley, Melbourne, Victoria
- St Bartholomew's Church, Norwood, Adelaide, South Australia
- St Bartholomew's Anglican Church and Cemetery, Prospect, New South Wales

=== Belgium ===
- St Bartholomew's Church, Liège

=== Canada ===
- St. Bartholomew's Anglican Church (Ottawa)

=== Czech Republic ===
- Cathedral of St. Bartholomew (Plzeň)
- St. Bartholomew's Church, Vrahovice

=== Germany ===
- St. Bartholomew's Church, Berchtesgaden
- Frankfurt Cathedral, also called Saint Bartholomew's Cathedral

=== India ===
- St Bartholomew's Church (Chorão Island), Goa State

=== Italy ===
- San Bartolomeo all'Isola, Rome
- Saint Bartholomew, Brugherio

=== Ireland ===
- St Bartholomew's Church, Dublin

=== Lithuania ===
- Church of St. Bartholomew, Vilnius

=== Malta ===
- Church of St Bartholomew, Għargħur
- St Bartholomew's Chapel, Rabat
- St Bartholomew's Chapel, Żurrieq

=== Philippines ===
- San Bartolome Church (Malabon), Metro Manila
- San Bartolome Apostol Parish Church, known as Nagcarlan Church, Laguna
- San Bartolome Church (Magalang), Pampanga

=== Slovenia ===
- St. Bartholomew's Church (Ljubljana)

=== United Kingdom ===
- St Bartholomew-the-Great, City of London
- St Bartholomew-the-Less, City of London
- Church of St Bartholomew, Aldsworth, Gloucestershire
- St Bartholomew's Church, Armley, Leeds, West Yorkshire
- St Andrew and St Bartholomew's Church, Ashleworth, a church in Gloucestershire with a hagioscope
- St Bartholomew's Church, Barbon, Cumbria
- St Bartholomew's Church, Barrow, Cheshire
- St Bartholomew's Church, Burwash, East Sussex
- St Bartholomew's Church, Edgbaston, Birmingham, West Midlands
- St Bartholomew's Church, Brighton
- St Bartholomew's Church, Chipping, Lancashire
- St Bartholomew's Church, Church Minshull, Cheshire
- St Bartholomew's Church, Colne, Lancashire
- St Bartholomew's Church, Cranmore, Somerset
- St Bartholomew's Church, Crewkerne, Somerset
- St Bartholomew's Church, Furtho, Northamptonshire
- St Bartholomew's Church, Goodnestone, Kent
- St Bartholomew's Church, Groton, Suffolk
- St Bartholomew's Church, Great Gransden, Huntingdonshire district of Cambridgeshire
- St Bartholomew's Church, Great Harwood, Lancashire
- St Bartholomew's Church, Greens Norton, Northamptonshire
- St Bartholomew's Church, Haslemere, Surrey
- St Bartholomew's Church, Longnor, Staffordshire
- St Bartholomew's Church, Lostwithiel, Cornwall
- St Bartholomew's Church, Lower Basildon, Berkshire
- Old St Bartholomew's Church, Lower Sapey, Worcestershire
- St Bartholomew's Church, Lyng, Somerset
- St Bartholomew's Church, Nettlebed, Oxfordshire
- Church of St Bartholomew, Notgrove, Gloucestershire
- St Bartholomew's Church, Newbiggin-by-the-Sea, Northumberland
- Church of St Bartholomew, Oake, Somerset
- St Bartholomew's Church, Orford, Suffolk
- St Bartholomew's Chapel, Oxford
- St Bartholomew's Chapel, Rochester, Kent
- St Bartholomew's Church, Penn, West Midlands
- St Bartholomew's Church, Quorn, Leicestershire
- St Bartholomew's Church, Richard's Castle, Herefordshire
- Church of St Bartholomew, Rodhuish, Somerset
- St Bartholomew's Church, Sealand, Flintshire, North Wales
- St Bartholomew's Church, Thurstaston, Wirral
- St Bartholomew's Church, Tong, Shropshire
- Church of St Bartholomew, Ubley, Somerset
- St Bartholomew's Church, Wednesbury, West Midlands
- St Bartholomew's Church, Welby, Lincolnshire
- St Bartholomew's Church, Whittington, Gloucestershire
- St Bartholomew's Church, Wilmslow, Cheshire
- St Bartholomew's Church, Winchester, Hampshire
- Church of St Bartholomew, Winstone, Gloucestershire
- Church of St Bartholomew, Yeovilton, Somerset

=== United States ===
- St. Bartholomew's Episcopal Church (Atlanta), an Episcopal parish in Atlanta, Georgia
- St. Bartholomew's Church (Burroughs, Georgia), a National Register of Historic Places listing in Chatham County, Georgia
- St. Bartholomew's Episcopal Church (Quantico, Maryland), historic Episcopal church at Quantico, Wicomico County, Maryland
- St. Bartholomew's Protestant Episcopal Church and Rectory, a historic Episcopal church and rectory in Crown Heights, Brooklyn, New York
- St. Bartholomew's Episcopal Church (Manhattan) or St. Bart's, a historic Episcopal parish in Midtown Manhattan, New York
- St. Bartholomew's Anglican Church (Tonawanda, New York)
- St. Bartholomew's Episcopal Church (Montgomery, Vermont), a historic building in Montgomery, Vermont
- St. Bartholomew's Episcopal Church (Poway), a parish in the Episcopal Diocese of San Diego

== See also ==
- St. Bartholomew, was one of the twelve apostles of Jesus Christ
- St. Bartholomew's (disambiguation)
- St. Bartholomew's Anglican Church (disambiguation)
- Covenham St Bartholomew, a village in Lincolnshire, England, United Kingdom
- Saint-Barthélemy (disambiguation)
- Bartholomew (disambiguation)
- St. Bartholomew's Episcopal Church (disambiguation), multiple churches of this name
