= St. Bartholomew's Episcopal Church =

St. Bartholomew's Episcopal Church may refer to:

- St. Bartholomew's Episcopal Church (Atlanta)
- St. Bartholomew's Episcopal Church (Brooklyn)
- St. Bartholomew's Episcopal Church (Manhattan)
- St. Bartholomew's Episcopal Church (Montgomery, Vermont)
- St. Bartholomew's Episcopal Church (Poway, California)
- St. Bartholomew's Episcopal Church (Quantico, Maryland)

== See also ==
- St. Bartholomew's Church (disambiguation)
