= Church of the Annunciation, Brighton =

Church in East Sussex, England

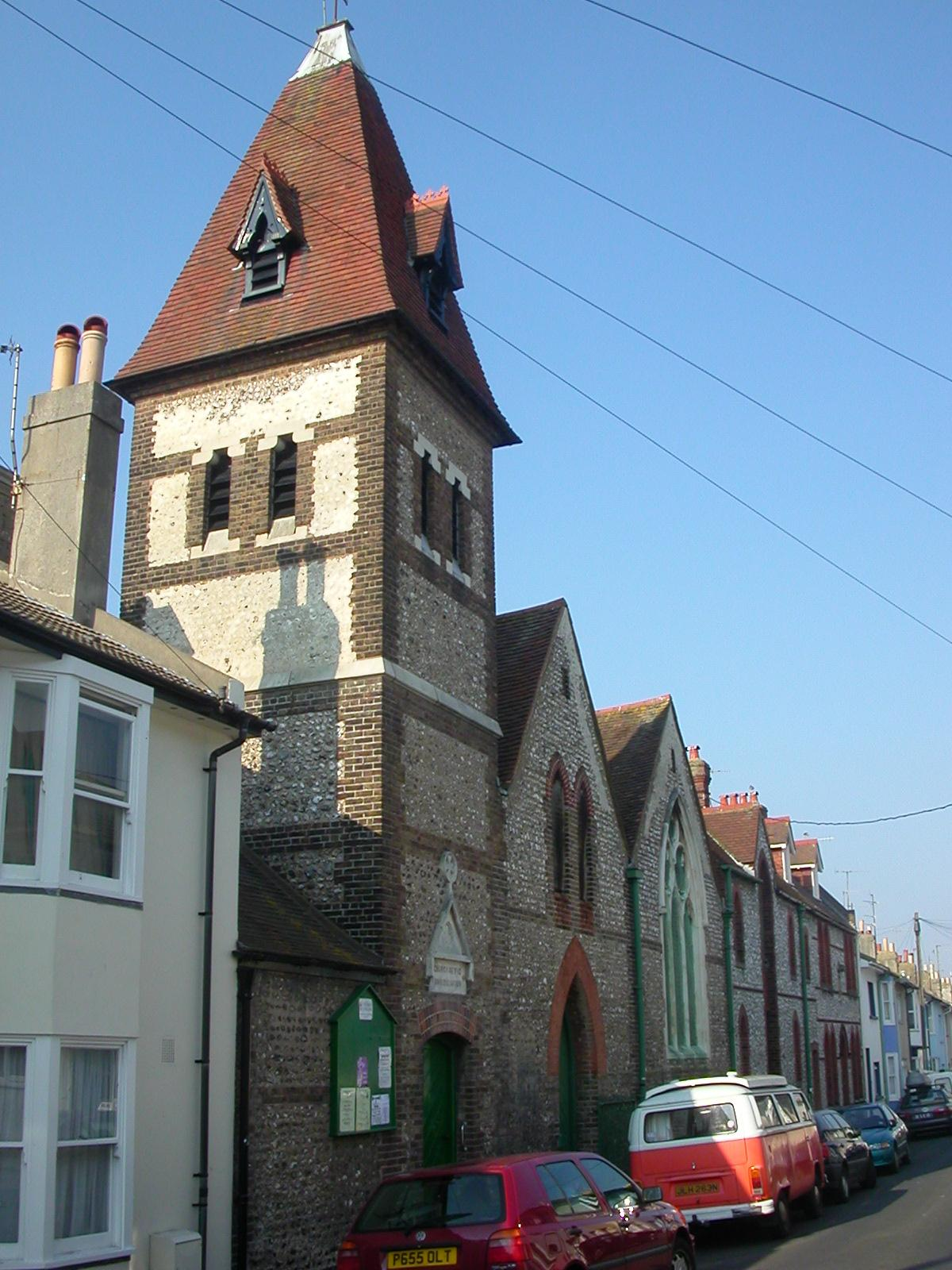
- Church of the Annunciation, Brighton
- 50°49′45.71″N 0°7′46.54″W
- Denomination: Church of England
- Churchmanship: Modern Catholic

History
- Status: Active
- Dedication: The Annunciation

Architecture
- Functional status: Parish church
- Heritage designation: Grade II listed
- Designated: 20 September 1996
- Architect: William Dancy
- Style: Gothic Revival
- Completed: 15 August 1864

Administration
- Province: Province of Canterbury
- Diocese: Diocese of Chichester
- Archdeaconry: Brighton and Lewes
- Deanery: Brighton
- Parish: The Annunciation Brighton

Clergy
- Vicar: Anthony Murley

The Church of the Annunciation is an Anglican church in Brighton, part of the English city of Brighton and Hove. It was one of several churches built in the 1860s on behalf of Rev. Arthur Wagner, the son of Rev. Henry Michell Wagner, Vicar of Brighton (1824–1870), and served a new area of poor housing in what is now the Hanover district. The church is a Grade II listed building.

== History ==
Arthur Wagner was ordained in 1850. For the next 20 years, until his father's death, he had some degree of freedom to choose the sites and designs for new churches in Brighton, which was growing rapidly at the time. Having paid for the construction and opening of one chapel of ease in 1862, in a working-class area in what is now the North Laine area, he decided to do the same in 1864 in another poor area which was being constructed on high ground between the Old Steine (site of the Royal Pavilion) and Queen's Park. The chosen site, on Washington Street, was narrow and offered little room to expand. Nevertheless, a local architect named William Dancy designed a building similar to St Mary Magdalene's (the church financed by Wagner in 1862) but adapted to fit the location.

The Church of the Annunciation was opened on 15 August 1864, and was initially administered by curates from St Paul's Church before being allocated its own parish, which covers much of the present-day Hanover area. Its popularity ensured that an enlargement was required by 1881. Little could be done in the small space available, but Brighton-based architect Edmund Scott — who had worked with Wagner on St Bartholomew's Church a few years earlier — was able to provide a new north aisle in a similar style to the original south aisle, using wooden columns for support in the same way as Dancy had. The rebuilt church, which cost £5,000 (again, fully funded by Wagner), was consecrated in 1884.

Arthur Wagner's churches followed the Anglo-Catholic Ritualist tradition, for which he often faced hostility from Protestant figures within the Anglican church. In 1902, the ecclesiastical court ruled that many of the elaborate fixtures within the church, including icons, candlesticks and confessional boxes, had to be removed, after receiving a complaint. In the interwar period, however, there was a new wave of decoration and ornamentation, including the introduction of two reredos.

The Church of the Annunciation was designated a Grade II listed building on 20 September 1996.

== Architecture ==
The main (eastern) side of the church consists of twin gables decorated with flint facings and red-brick surrounds. The western side has three sets of triple lancet windows, the centre set of which is above the high altar. The overall style suggests a revival of Early English Gothic.

The Annunciation stained-glass window was designed by Edward Burne-Jones and made by Morris & Co. In 1882, the church was presented with the east window from St Nicholas' Church, which had been designed for that church 29 years previously by the ecclesiastical architect Richard Cromwell Carpenter. It was built into the centre of the eastern face when the church was being rebuilt by Scott. A tower was added by Scott and another architect, F.T. Cawthorn, in 1892, and a vicarage was built next to the church in 1898.

== See also ==
- Grade II listed buildings in Brighton and Hove: C–D
- List of places of worship in Brighton and Hove

== Bibliography ==
- Antram, Nicholas; Morrice, Richard (2008). Brighton and Hove. Pevsner Architectural Guides. London: Yale University Press. ISBN 978-0-300-12661-7.
- Dale, Antony (1989). Brighton Churches. London: Routledge. ISBN 0-415-00863-8.
