= St Barts =

See either:

- St. Bartholomew's (disambiguation)
- Saint Barthélemy (St Barths), in the Caribbean
- Saint-Barthélemy (disambiguation)
