= Listed buildings in Groton, Suffolk =

Historic structures in Suffolk, England

Groton is a village and civil parish in the Babergh District of Suffolk, England. It contains 21 listed buildings that are recorded in the National Heritage List for England. Of these one is grade I, one is grade II* and 19 are grade II.

This list is based on the information retrieved online from Historic England.

== Key ==
Grade	Criteria
I	Buildings that are of exceptional interest
II*	Particularly important buildings of more than special interest
II	Buildings that are of special interest

== Listing ==
Name	Grade	Location	Type	Completed (Note: The date given is the date used by Historic England as significant for the initial building or that of an important part in the structure's description.)	Date designated	Grid ref. (Note: The grid reference is based on the British national grid reference system, sometimes known as OSGB36, used by the Ordnance Survey.) Geo-coordinates	Notes	Entry number (Note: The "List Entry Number" is a unique number assigned to each listed building and scheduled monument by Historic England.)	Image	Wikidata
Frog Hall Cottage	II				10 July 1980	TL9663743199; 52°03′08″N 0°51′59″E		1037282	Upload Photo	Q26288985
Groton House	II				16 February 1976	TL9611242580; 52°02′49″N 0°51′30″E		1351465	Upload Photo	Q26634568
Place Barn	II				10 July 1980	TL9596141968; 52°02′29″N 0°51′21″E		1037283	Upload Photo	Q26288986
Castling's Hall	II	Castling's Heath			23 January 1958	TL9710643347; 52°03′12″N 0°52′24″E		1194647	Upload Photo	Q26489263
Castling's Heath Cottage	II	Castling's Heath			10 July 1980	TL9693843036; 52°03′03″N 0°52′15″E		1194652	Upload Photo	Q26489268
Manor Farmhouse	II	Castling's Heath			10 July 1980	TL9716242994; 52°03′01″N 0°52′26″E		1351466	Upload Photo	Q26634569
Church of St Bartholomew	I	Church Street	church building		23 January 1958	TL9596941680; 52°02′20″N 0°51′21″E		1037284	Church of St Bartholomew More images	Q17541918
Fox and Hounds Inn	II	Church Street	inn		10 July 1980	TL9590241568; 52°02′16″N 0°51′17″E		1037285	Fox and Hounds Inn More images	Q26288987
Groton Hall	II*	Church Street	house		23 January 1958	TL9597741658; 52°02′19″N 0°51′21″E		1285612	Groton Hall More images	Q17534184
Gosling Green House	II	Gosling Green			10 July 1980	TL9720342402; 52°02′42″N 0°52′27″E		1194662	Upload Photo	Q26489277
Byeways Cotlee Mittecot	II	Groton Street			10 July 1980	TL9585841732; 52°02′22″N 0°51′15″E		1037286	Upload Photo	Q26288989
Crown House	II	Groton Street			23 January 1958	TL9584941757; 52°02′23″N 0°51′15″E		1037287	Upload Photo	Q26288991
Groton Place	II	Groton Street			23 January 1958	TL9572842079; 52°02′33″N 0°51′09″E		1194685	Upload Photo	Q26489300
Old Rectory Cottage	II	Groton Street			10 July 1980	TL9583541797; 52°02′24″N 0°51′14″E		1285584	Upload Photo	Q26574266
The Old Rectory	II	Groton Street			10 July 1980	TL9583341815; 52°02′24″N 0°51′14″E		1037288	Upload Photo	Q26288993
The Old School House	II	Groton Street			10 July 1980	TL9585141684; 52°02′20″N 0°51′15″E		1037289	Upload Photo	Q26288994
Spout Farmhouse	II	Horners Green			10 July 1980	TL9648141886; 52°02′26″N 0°51′48″E		1285589	Upload Photo	Q26574271
Daisygreen Cottages	II	Parliament Heath			16 February 1976	TL9606143675; 52°03′24″N 0°51′30″E		1194694	Upload Photo	Q26489307
Lodge Cottage	II	Parliament Heath			10 July 1980	TL9594743160; 52°03′08″N 0°51′23″E		1037290	Upload Photo	Q26288995
Malting Farmhouse	II	Parliament Heath			10 July 1980	TL9631843366; 52°03′14″N 0°51′43″E		1351467	Upload Photo	Q26634570
Primrose Cottage	II	Parliament Heath			10 July 1980	TL9621143411; 52°03′16″N 0°51′37″E		1037291	Upload Photo	Q26288996

== See also ==
- Grade I listed buildings in Suffolk
- Grade II* listed buildings in Suffolk

== Sources ==
- Bettely, James; Pevsner, Nikolaus (2015) [1961], Suffolk: West, The Buildings of England, New Haven and London: Yale University Press, ISBN 978-0-300-19655-9
