= St. Bartholomew's Anglican Church =

St. Bartholomew's Anglican Church may refer to:

== Australia ==
- St. Bartholomew's Anglican Church and Cemetery (Prospect, New South Wales)

== Canada ==
- St. Bartholomew's Anglican Church (Ottawa)
- St. Bartholomew's Anglican Church (Toronto)

== United States ==
- St. Bartholomew's Anglican Church (Tonawanda, New York)

== See also ==
- St. Bartholomew's Church (disambiguation)
