= Arthur Wagner =

Church of England clergyman (1824–1902)

The Reverend Arthur Wagner
- Seated at his writing-desk, c. 1880
- Born: 13 June 1824; Park Hill, Windsor, Berkshire
- Died: 14 January 1902 (aged 77); Brighton, East Sussex
- Resting place: Woodvale Cemetery, Brighton; 50.835°N 0.115°W
- Education: B.A. (Hons), Mathematics
- Alma mater: Eton College (1835–42); Trinity College, Cambridge (1842–46)
- Occupation: Clergyman
- Years active: 1848–1902
- Known for: Vicar of St Paul's Church, Brighton
- Parent(s): Henry Michell Wagner (1792–1870) and Elizabeth Harriott (1797–1829)
- Relatives: Mary Ann Wagner (aunt); Elizabeth Coombe (cousin); Fanny Coombe (cousin)

Arthur Douglas Wagner (13 June 1824 – 14 January 1902) was a Church of England clergyman in Brighton, East Sussex, England. He served for more than 50 years at St Paul's Church in the town—first as a curate, then from 1873 as its vicar. As the only son of the Rev. Henry Michell Wagner (Vicar of Brighton for 46 years) and his wife Elizabeth Harriott, who died when he was a child, Arthur Wagner inherited considerable wealth. Following the pattern set by his father—who founded several churches in Brighton—he was able to pay for the construction and endowment of four churches in the town, three of which survive, and another in rural East Sussex where he owned a country estate. Like his father, he became embroiled in disputes and controversy: he held strongly Tractarian views and was often criticised for the advanced ritualism of the services he held at St Paul's, while his involvement in the Constance Kent affair caused national debate about priest–penitent privilege.

Wagner's influence in Victorian Brighton was considerable. "Not just a very rich clergyman of advanced religious beliefs", he was also greatly interested in church architecture and decoration. His wealth and his successful ministry at St Paul's allowed Wagner to found new churches in growing suburbs such as Hanover, Montpelier and the London Road/Lewes Road areas, which were notable both for their richly designed interiors and for their determinedly Tractarian tradition. The vast St Bartholomew's Church continues to serve a densely populated inner-city area; St Martin's Church, built shortly afterwards, is even larger and served a district partly developed by Wagner himself; the Church of the Annunciation combines a modest exterior with striking internal fittings; and he was involved with the design and fitting out of St Paul's Church, although his father paid for it. Arthur Wagner's influence was also seen in the "grandeur and artistry" of St Michael and All Angels Church, built for the ministry of one of his curates at St Paul's. Although his official status was never more than vicar of a single church, his influence was such that "he was acknowledged as virtual Bishop-coadjutant of Brighton".

== Early life and ordination ==
Arthur Douglas Wagner was the only son of Henry Michell Wagner (1792–1870), Vicar of Brighton from 1824 until his death, and Elizabeth Harriott Douglas (1797–1829). (Note: Henry Michell Wagner remarried after her his first wife's death. His second marriage produced two sons, Joshua and Henry junior, who were therefore half-brothers to Arthur Wagner.) They had met in 1820 and were married in 1823. Both had an ecclesiastical background: Henry Wagner's grandfather Henry Michell was Vicar of Brighton during the 18th century and was an influential figure when the town's fashionability was at its height, and Elizabeth Harriott's father William Douglas and grandfather John Douglas were respectively the Precentor of Salisbury Cathedral and the Bishop of Salisbury.

Wagner's birthplace, Park Hill in Windsor, was owned by his mother's family. Born on 13 June 1824, he was named Arthur after Arthur Wellesley, 1st Duke of Wellington, whose son had been tutored by Henry Wagner from 1817 and who later appointed Wagner as Vicar of Brighton. His baptism took place at St Mary's Church in nearby Winkfield on 6 August 1824.

The family's permanent residence from 1824, when Henry Michell Wagner became Vicar of Brighton, was the medieval vicarage in The Lanes. This was demolished and replaced by a new vicarage (still extant as part of Brighton and Hove High School, and now a Grade II listed building) in 1835. After Wagner's mother died in 1829, his grandmother Anne Elizabeth Wagner and maiden aunt Mary Ann Wagner moved into the vicarage and helped with his upbringing. He attended St Nicholas' parish church from an early age, and is believed to have gone to school for a time at an "academy for young gentlemen" in Montpelier Road, next to where the new vicarage was later built. He then attended Eton College for seven years from September 1835 and then studied mathematics at Trinity College, Cambridge between 1842 and 1846. He graduated with an honours degree.

"It [was] evident from the earliest days" that Wagner would follow his father into Anglican ministry. Henry Michell Wagner had already funded three new Anglican churches in Brighton when, in 1846, he engaged the Tractarian-influenced architect Richard Cromwell Carpenter to design and build a fourth specifically for Arthur Wagner—who had already formed Tractarian views on ecclesiology and worship, particularly through the influence of Joshua Watson, his step-grandfather and a prominent High Churchman. St Paul's Church, centrally located on West Street close to long-established poor districts around the old town, was completed in 1848 and consecrated in October 1849. In January 1850, Wagner was ordained and became perpetual curate of the church, which was not yet parished because it was administered as a chapel of ease by St Nicholas' Church, Brighton's ancient parish church.

== Wagner's churches ==
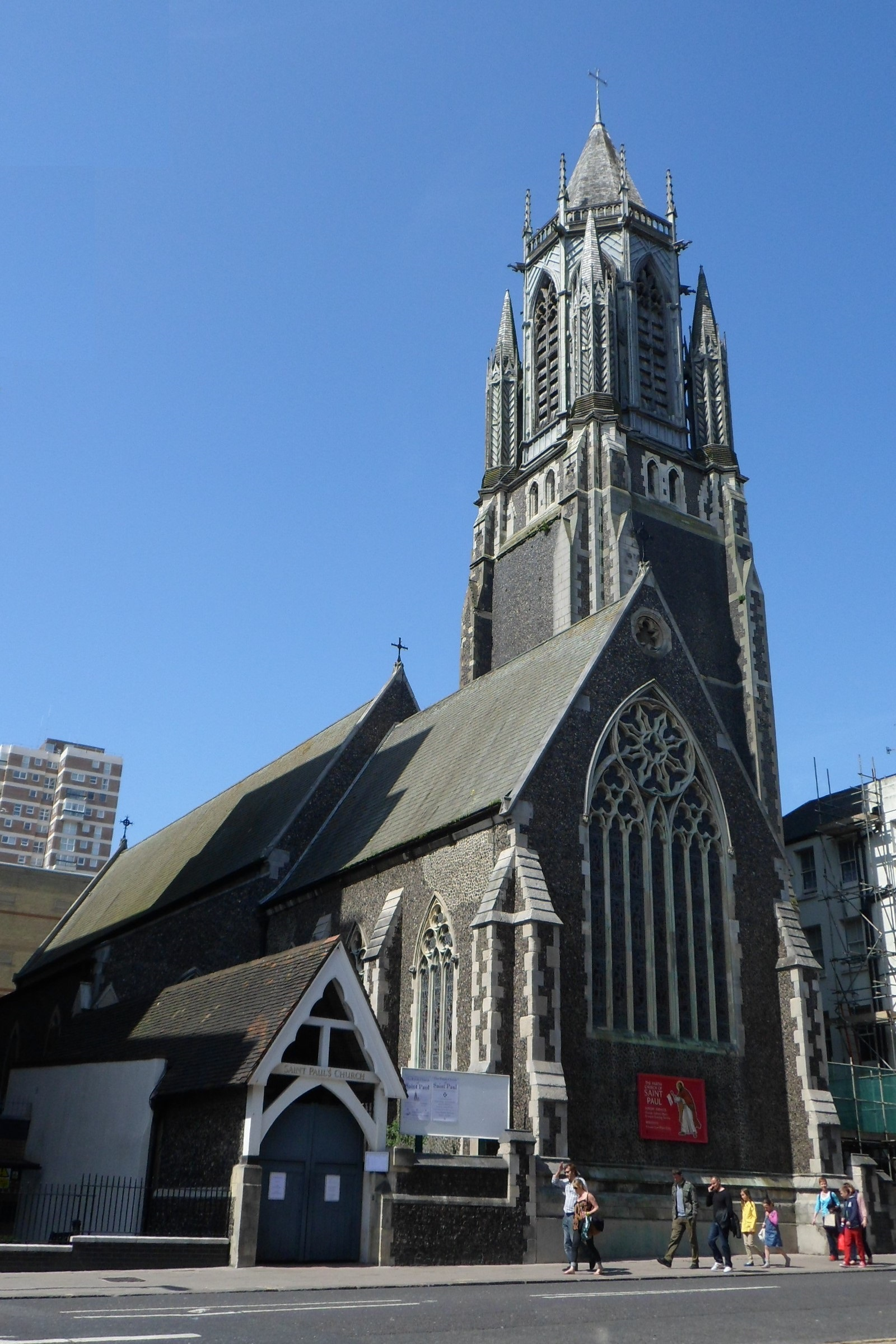
St Paul's Church, Brighton

Although his father paid for its construction, St Paul's Church on West Street was effectively Arthur Wagner's first church: he ministered there from the start and paid for many of the fittings himself. Soon, he was looking to expand the Church of England's reach in poor areas of Brighton, just as his father had done, by finding sites for new churches and paying for them to be built. His first two churches were built while Henry Michell Wagner was still Vicar of Brighton, a position he held until his death in 1870.

First to be established was the St Mary and St Mary Magdalene's Church (1862), a small and plain Gothic Revival building in "a poor quarter of the original town" (Bread Street, in the present North Laine district). It was a chapel of ease to St Paul's and was never consecrated. George Frederick Bodley, a Gothic Revival architect who lived in Brighton at the time, was responsible for the simple design, and Wagner paid for the £2,500 cost himself. The area became depopulated in the mid-20th century as commercial development took over, and the church closed temporarily in the 1920s and permanently in 1948. After a period of use by the local electricity board, it was demolished in the mid-1960s to be replaced by an office building which severed the old street. Architecturally it was a "modest" building but "of distinction" because of its arched timber-framed roof and red-brick exterior.

The Church of the Annunciation, built to serve the Hanover neighbourhood whose houses included many built with the help of loans from Wagner, was his next church. It opened in 1864 on the Feast of the Annunciation (25 March) and was a chapel of ease to St Paul's until a parish was allocated in 1881. Local architect William Dancy designed an Early English Gothic Revival building on an awkward, narrow and sloping site on Washington Street. It was similar on the outside to St Mary and St Mary Magdalene's Church.

Wagner founded a temporary church dedicated to Saint Bartholomew in 1868 in the densely populated area between London Road and Brighton railway station. It stood on Providence Place next to a 400-capacity church school. After his father's death in 1870, Wagner made plans for a much larger permanent church on the site. Originally conceived as a 13-bay, 322 feet (98 m) by 46 feet (14 m) building with an integrated school, it was shortened to 11½ bays before building began in February 1872 (and in the end only nine were built). The new plans (submitted in September 1873) provided for a shorter but wider and much taller church: 170 by 59 by 135 feet (52 m × 18 m × 41 m). When it opened in September 1874, the new St Bartholomew's Church offered free seating for 1,500 worshippers—the first church in Brighton to be free of pew rents from the date of opening. Despite its vast size (the nave is the largest in any British parish church), the church cost £18,000—much less than St Peter's Church, built 50 years previously—because plain brickwork was used instead of the latter's Portland stone and certain planned features such as transepts were omitted. Much was spent on the ornate interior decoration, though.

Although built just after Henry Michell Wagner's death, St Bartholomew's Church was not planned as a memorial to Arthur Wagner's father: that distinction went to St Martin's Church nearby on the Lewes Road in the Round Hill area of Brighton, also planned and built in the early 1870s. At the time of his death, Henry Michell Wagner was planning to found another Anglican church in Brighton and had set aside £3,000 from his personal wealth, but had not decided on a location or any other details. Arthur Wagner and his half-brothers Joshua and Henry chose the site and agreed to fund the whole project themselves. The Round Hill area was being developed with high-density housing at this time, and the Wagner family planned to build the church on the west side of Lewes Road opposite the bottom of Elm Grove.

The Church of the Transfiguration, soon afterwards renamed the Church of the Resurrection, was built in 1876–77 and was situated just 100 yards (91 m) from St Paul's Church on West Street. Wagner intended to attract the town's fishermen and other poor residents to the church, realising that they were "awed by the size and grandeur" of St Paul's and its congregation, which by this stage consisted of fashionable high-class visitors and wealthy residents. Construction was problematical because the owner of an adjacent brewery objected, forcing Wagner to change the plans and have it built underground. Richard Herbert Carpenter was the architect. The church opened in 1878 but was never successful: it was converted into a warehouse in 1912 and demolished in 1966.

== Community of the Blessed Virgin Mary ==
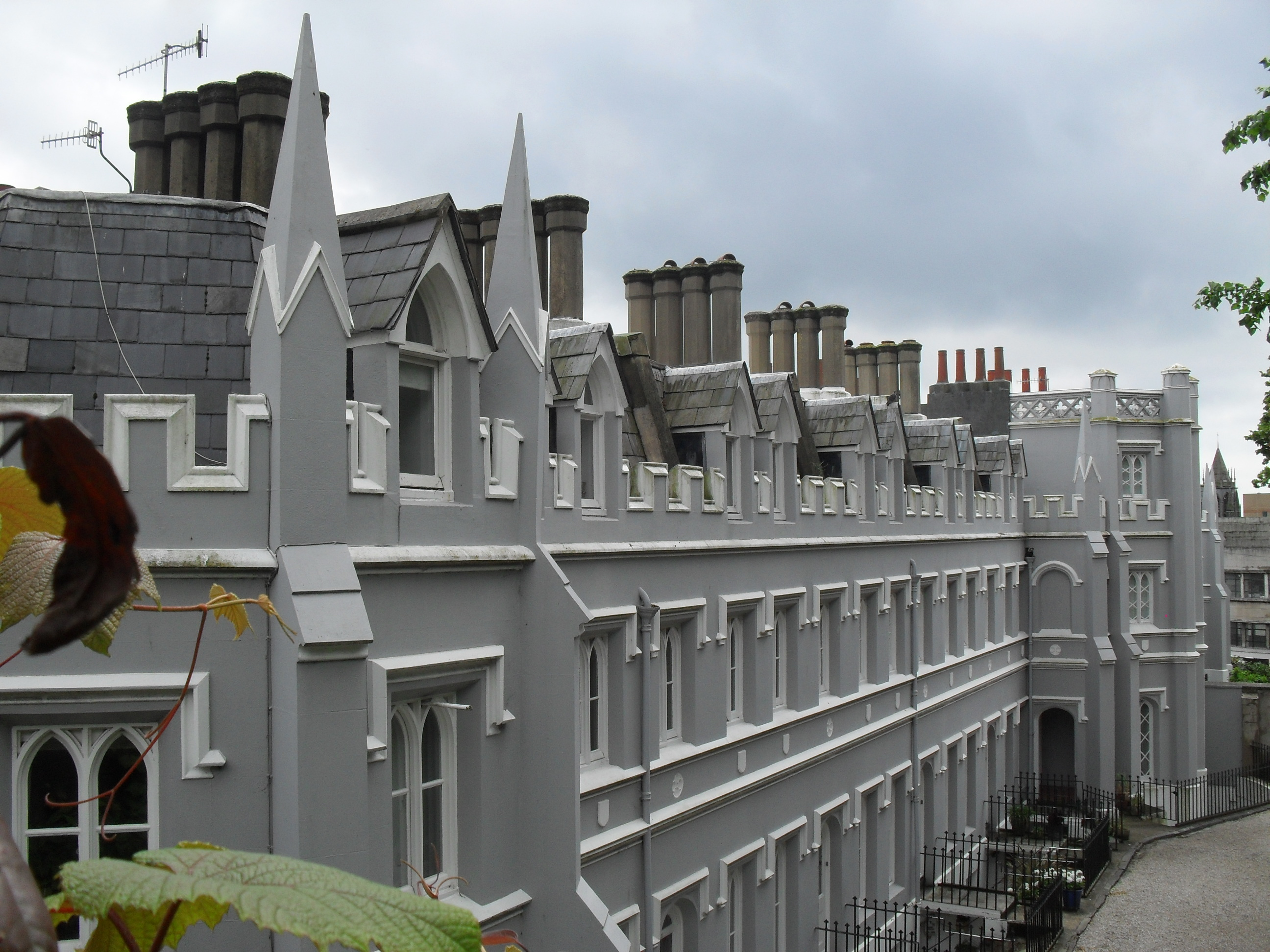
The Community was housed at Wykeham Terrace, Brighton.

Wagner founded a religious order in Brighton in 1855. Named the Community of the Blessed Virgin Mary, it was linked with St Paul's Church: the sisters helped to look after the building, visit parishioners and run the Sunday School. At first they were based in two houses on nearby Queen's Square. Around the same time, Wagner's cousin Rev. George Wagner—curate of St Stephen's Church—had established a "Home for Female Penitents" (prostitutes) on the Lewes Road. George Wagner died in 1857, at which point Arthur Wagner moved the home to Wykeham Terrace (adjacent to Queen's Square) and put the sisters in charge of rehabilitating the former prostitutes and taking in others who had been referred to the home by police officers or doctors. (Prostitution was a significant problem in mid-19th-century Brighton: more than 300 women and some children were known to work as prostitutes at that time, and there were nearly 100 brothels). Moving the home to Wykeham Terrace, where it took up nine of the twelve houses, allowed more than 40 women to be looked after, whereas the capacity at Lewes Road had been 12. Wagner and the sisters maintained a strict regime, with regular surveillance, hard work and punishments for misbehaviour, but the women were offered proper healthcare, education, training for domestic service, and charitable help. At a time when such assistance was limited, and provided only by private means, it was "probably the most effective single unit in the town".

By the late 19th century, St Mary's Home for Penitents had outgrown the Wykeham Terrace buildings. Wagner's ill health meant no action could be taken to address this; but ten years after his death, a large new site was secured on the Falmer Road in Rottingdean (Note: But located within Ovingdean parish.) and a much larger building designed by local architect F.T. Cawthorn was erected. It remained in use until the late 20th century. Short-lived stints as an old people's home, a school and a centre for the Church of Scientology ended in 1977, 1980 and 1984 respectively, at which point it was converted into flats called Rottingdean Place (opened in 1987).

=== Constance Kent affair ===
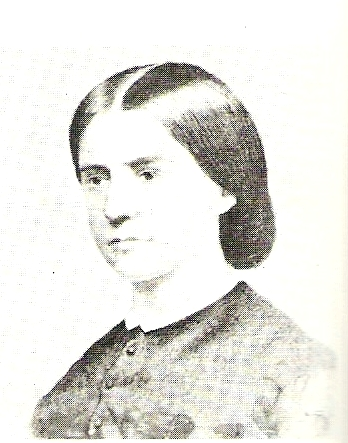
Constance Kent

"The most famous incident of Arthur Wagner's life" concerned his involvement with the trial of Constance Kent, who committed one of Victorian England's most notorious murders. Kent was a 16-year-old girl who lived in Rode, Somerset with an extended family of siblings and half-siblings, her father and his second wife, and various housemaids and other household employees. Even before her birth mother died, Kent's stepmother Mary Drewe Pratt "acquired a dominant position in the household" and behaved disrespectfully towards her. Constance Kent's resentment built up until she reached a point where she wanted to take revenge to protect her mother's memory. Dismissing the idea of killing her, Kent instead decided to murder her stepmother's favourite child—Francis Savill Kent, who was 13 years younger than her. On 30 June 1860, she took the boy (then aged nearly four) from his bed, suffocated him and slit his throat, leaving his body in a privy outside the house. The local police had great difficulty establishing a motive or making any progress with the case, and even when Inspector Jonathan Whicher was called in from Scotland Yard no successful prosecution was achieved—although both Constance Kent and a governess were arrested, charged and released at various times.

In 1861, Constance Kent entered a convent in Dinan in France after leaving a finishing school in the same town. Enjoying convent life but unable to stay at Dinan for ever, a mutual friend wrote to Arthur Wagner asking if he could accommodate her at St Mary's Home for Penitents as a paying guest. She moved there in August 1863. While living there she was confirmed and began to make confession regularly. Around Easter 1865, she confessed the murder of her half-brother to Arthur Wagner, described the circumstances and said she would give herself up to the police.

News of Kent's confession became public soon afterwards, and Wagner faced public condemnation. It was claimed he encouraged Kent to confess, and that he convinced her to surrender to the police. He repeatedly denied this, although he stated that he did not discourage Kent from going to the police after she told him she would. At her insistence, Wagner spoke to the Home Secretary Sir George Grey, 2nd Baronet and chief magistrate Sir Thomas Henry, to whom Kent gave a written confession. When the case was heard in May 1865, Wagner was cross-examined; his refusal to state what Constance Kent had said to him during her confession resulted in an "outburst of ultra-Protestant fury". Public disquiet at the use of Catholic-style ritual at St Paul's Church turned to national outrage when it was established that confession was heard. Physical and verbal attacks on Wagner occurred regularly, and Wagner's home and the St Mary's Home for Penitents were put under police guard. Anti-Catholic Liberal politician George Hammond Whalley falsely claimed in the House of Commons that Wagner had "got rid of" a young resident of St Mary's Home who had left money to the Home in her will—she was in fact an inmate of a home elsewhere in Sussex, and Wagner had only met her briefly—and the Central Protestant Association (an anti-High Church organisation) called for the Mayor of Brighton to bring before Parliament a statement condemning the "base and degrading confessional practices carried on ... by traitors" within the Church of England. A meeting they held in Brighton descended into violence. Later in May 1865, Wagner was assaulted in the street; and on another occasion he was shot at by an unknown assailant but suffered no injury. Only after national newspapers such as The Times and The Morning Post ran articles condemning the ultra-Protestant disturbances in Brighton did the furor die down.

Kent was found guilty of the murder in summer 1865. Her death sentence was commuted to life imprisonment; she served 20 years before being released. Wagner wrote to William Ewart Gladstone several times during her imprisonment asking for leniency to be shown and to try to secure her early release, but without success. He maintained regular communication with Kent throughout her term of imprisonment.

== Other work ==
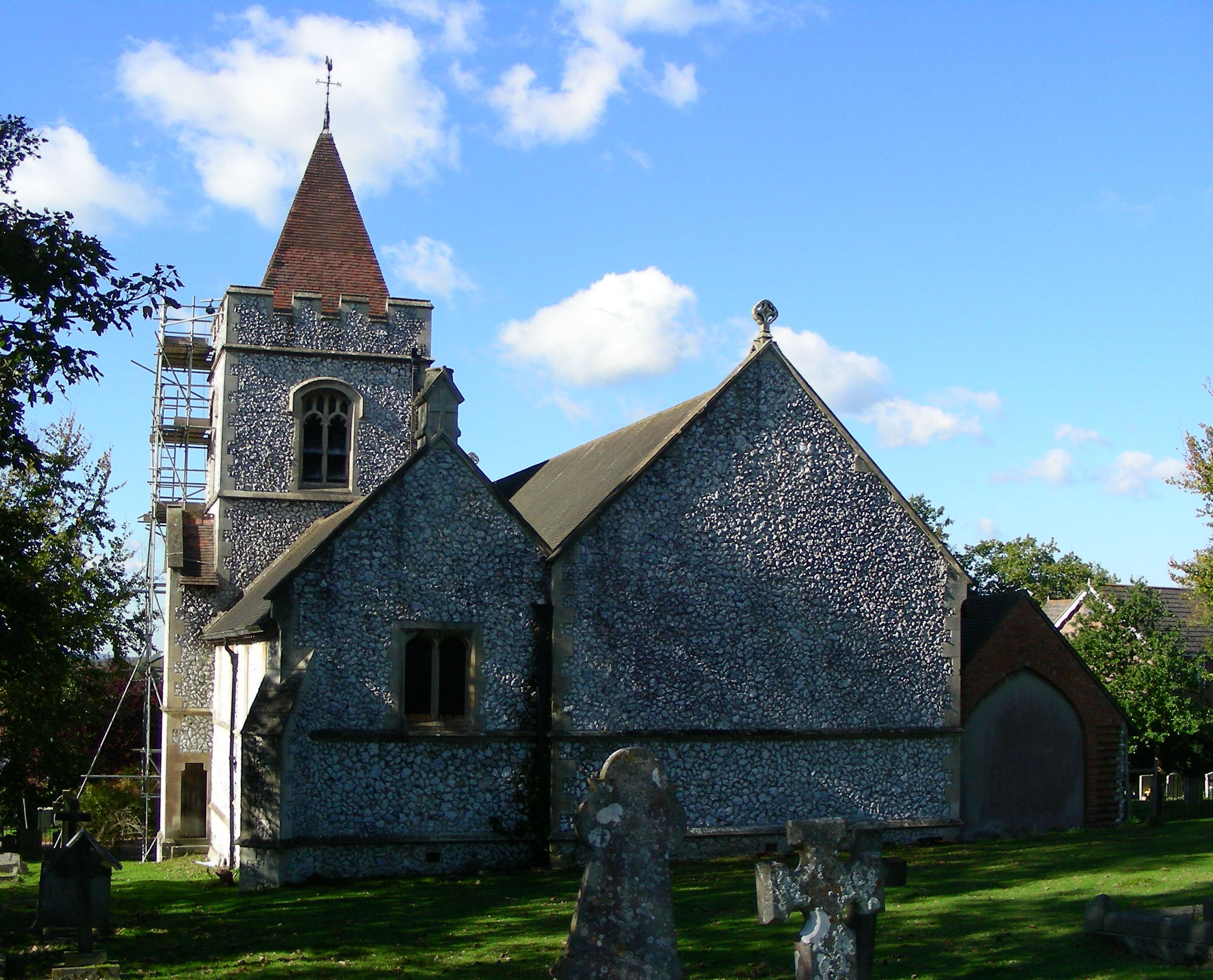
St Mary the Virgin's Church, Buxted

Wagner had a lifelong concern for the lives of poor people in Brighton, and throughout his life he took practical steps to help them. During the 1860s he helped financially with the development of large parts of the Hanover neighbourhood, which was a densely populated area with much terraced housing. "One of his hidden charities" involved lending small amounts of money regularly to small-scale housebuilders who wanted to build these houses but could not afford large loans from conventional providers. In this way, large numbers of houses were built rapidly in streets such as Islingword Road and Whichelo Place. Similarly, he paid for the construction of much of the housing in the densely populated area between Upper Lewes Road and Lewes Road, developed between the 1860s and the 1880s and served by St Martin's Church. He was responsible for building about 400 houses in this area, none of which were to cost more than £120.

After his father Henry Michell Wagner's death, Arthur Wagner bought a small rural estate in East Sussex, and divided his time between Brighton and there. Totease House was situated on the edge of Buxted and was built in the early 19th century. St Margaret's Church at Buxted Park, the parish church of Buxted, was distant from the centre of the village and from the house, so Wagner paid for an additional church to be built. St Mary the Virgin's Church was built in 1885–87 and opened on 11 June 1887. The Gothic Revival design was the work of Edmund Scott (architect of St Bartholomew's Church) and F.T. Cawthorn. Nine years earlier, Wagner had built a house in the village to provide extra accommodation for the sisters of the Community of the Blessed Virgin Mary, and in 1883 he built himself a new house with its own chapel which was shared with the Community's sisters. Both buildings survive, but the sisters' house passed into new ownership when they moved to their larger premises at Rottingdean in 1912.

== Personal life and views ==
Arthur Wagner remained unmarried throughout his life. Two unmarried cousins looked after him for much of his life. His generally "simple" and "ascetic" lifestyle, which included lifelong fasting on Fridays, contrasted with his enthusiasm for collecting manuscripts and books, which totalled 12,000 by his death. Many of these were religious books, tracts and manuscripts, including valuable first editions, but he also collected histories, biographies, geographical and topographical books, and lithographs. No record survives of how much the sale of Wagner's library fetched, but such was the volume of works that the sale process took three days. His last years were characterised by ill health and failing mental faculties, but he resisted calls to resign from his parish.

Prominent High Churchmen who were counted among Wagner's friends included John Keble and John Henry Newman, who converted to Roman Catholicism in 1845 and later became Cardinal Newman. Both Keble and Henry Edward Manning preached at St Paul's Church at Wagner's invitation. Prime Minister William Ewart Gladstone worshipped at St Paul's Church whenever he was in Brighton and was "a slight acquaintance" of Wagner's. Wagner and fellow Tractarian Edward Bouverie Pusey had known each other since childhood and were close friends.

Wagner had a lifelong opposition to the consecration of Anglican churches, on the basis that this would "[give] an opening for the State to intervene in their affairs". This view was shared by many Tractarians. On one occasion he complained to Richard Durnford, Bishop of Chichester, that consecration was "a farce". Pusey supported Wagner in his attempts to leave his newly built churches unconsecrated, but to no avail.

Wagner was noted for his generosity as much as for his great wealth. It is estimated that he spent between £60,000 and £70,000 of his own money on new churches in Brighton alone, excluding the ongoing costs of maintaining them which he invariably bore himself. Until the 1880s, when they were granted their own parishes, all of his new churches were chapels of ease to St Paul's Church; Wagner paid for several curates to look after these churches. He also contributed hundreds of pounds annually to church schools and considerably more to the running of St Mary's Home for Penitents: it is known that he spent £2,500 on it in 1865, for example. His housebuilding activities in Hanover and Round Hill cost at least £40,000.

Arthur Wagner's tolerant personality and aversion to quarrel contrasted with his father, who enjoyed challenging his opponents and asserting his authority. However, Henry Michell Wagner was much more tolerant of ecclesiastical differences and traditional structures of authority. For example, the elder Wagner maintained excellent relations with all five Bishops of Chichester who worked with him during his years as Vicar of Brighton; but Richard Durnford, the incumbent during most of Arthur Wagner's time at St Paul's Church, found him to be "a difficult man who liked his [own] way". Both Wagners, though, tended to generate controversy and opposition but stood "impervious" and "unmoved" against it. In Arthur Wagner's case, this ability to remain aloof to opposition was helped by his remote, introvert nature and aversion to publicity: he did little beyond his church work, his lifestyle was simple and austere, and was described by one friend as humourless.

== Death ==
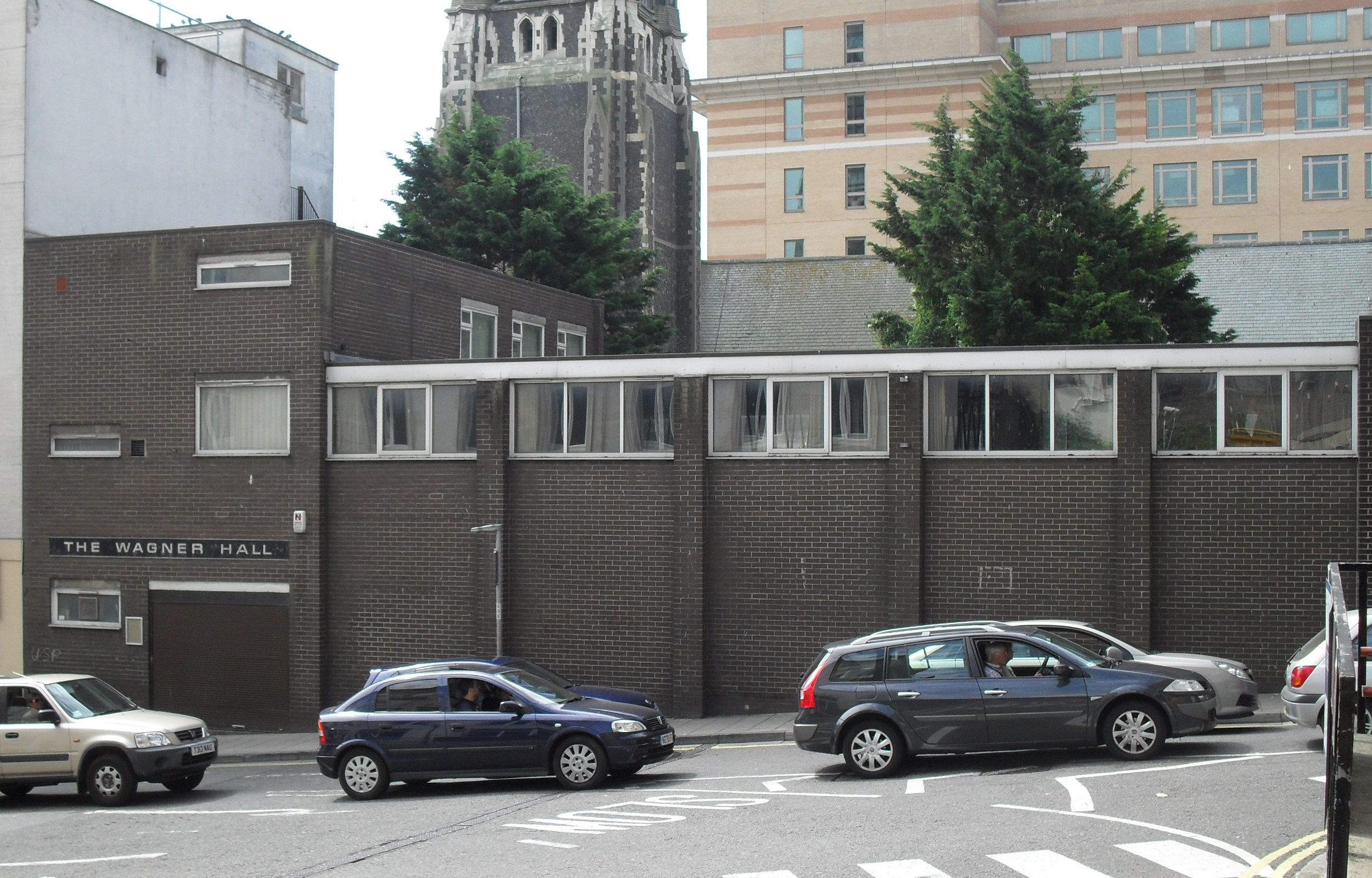
Wagner Hall next to St Paul's Church (left background) commemorates Arthur Wagner.

Arthur Wagner died on 14 January 1902 at Belvedere, the home he had occupied since his father's death in 1870. It was next to the old Vicarage on Montpelier Road in the Montpelier area of Brighton. He was buried at Brighton Extra Mural Cemetery alongside his father, and is among many of "Victorian ... Brighton's great and good" to be buried there. The burial was attended by 3,000 people, and churches across Brighton held Requiems in his honour. He left an estate of nearly £50,000 at 1902 prices; the money was endowed to the churches he founded and to the Community of the Blessed Virgin Mary.

After Wagner's death, Belvedere was sold and became a hotel called the Park Royal Court Hotel. It was demolished in 1965, and the Park Royal flats now stand on the site.

Wagner is commemorated by the Wagner Hall, built in 1965 as a new church hall for St Paul's Church. It stands next to the church on Regency Road on the site of a Baptist chapel.

== Publications ==
Wagner published the following pamphlets:

- Parochial Sermons Bearing on the Subjects of the Day (1855)
- Reasons for Disobeying on Principle (1874)
- Christ or Caesar: an Open Letter to the Archbishop of Canterbury (1874)
- Christ or Caesar, Part II: a Letter to the Lord Bishop of Chichester (1877)
