= St Paul's Church, Brighton =

Church in Brighton, England

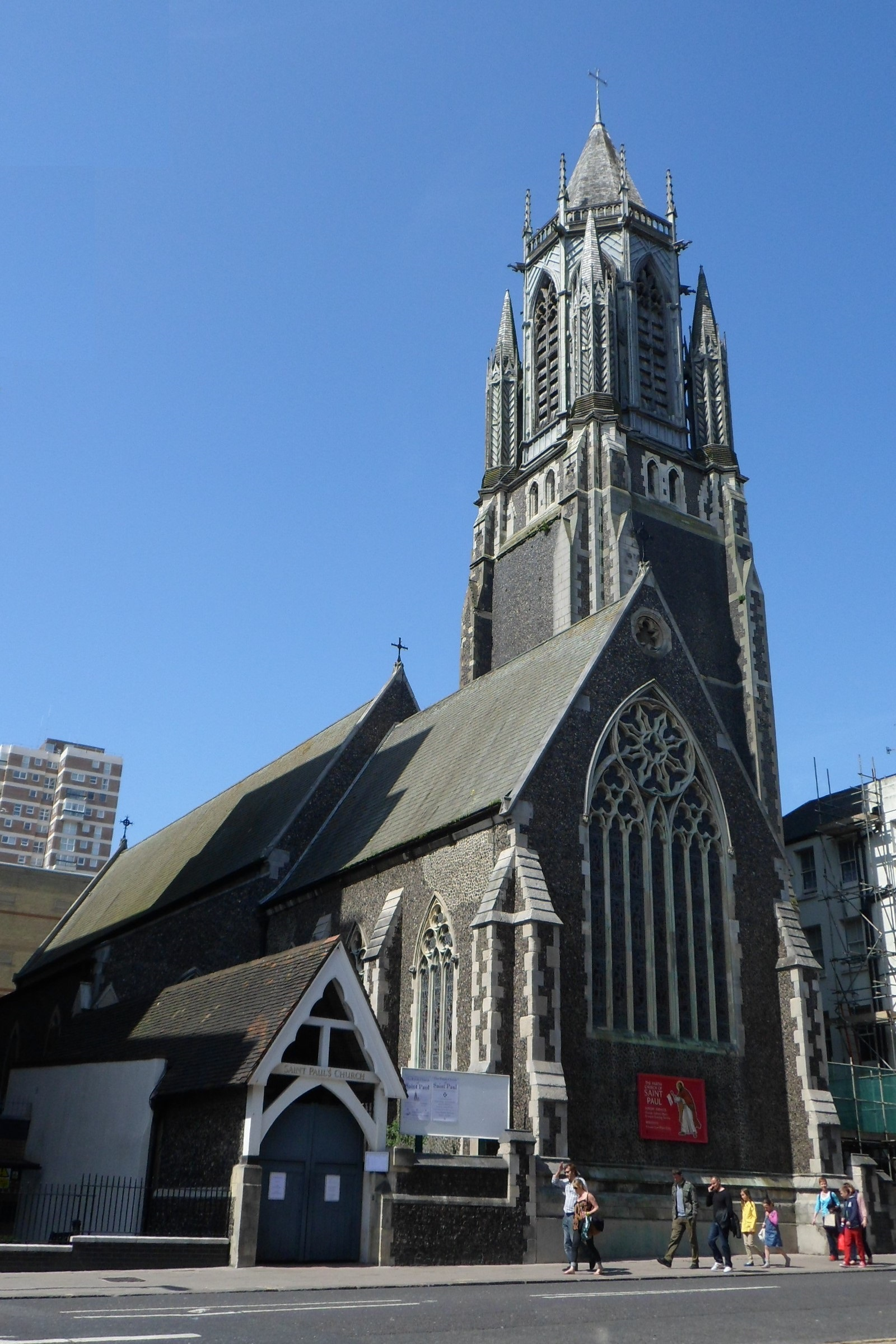
- St Paul's Church viewed from the southeast
- St Paul's Church, Brighton
- 50°49′19.39″N 0°8′39.81″W
- Denomination: Church of England
- Churchmanship: Anglo Catholic
- Website: Saint Paul's, Brighton

History
- Dedication: Saint Paul

Architecture
- Architect: Richard Cromwell Carpenter

Administration
- Province: Canterbury
- Diocese: Chichester
- Archdeaconry: Archdeaconry of Brighton & Lewes
- Deanery: Brighton
- Parish: Brighton, St Paul

Clergy
- Vicar: Fr Ben Eadon CMP

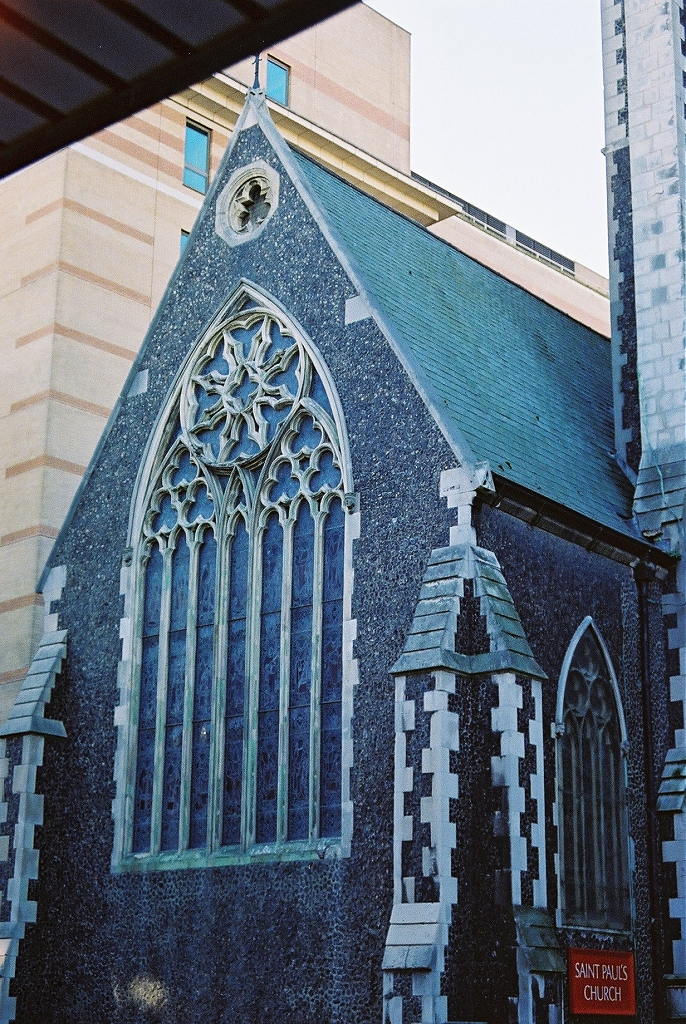
The eastern end of the church

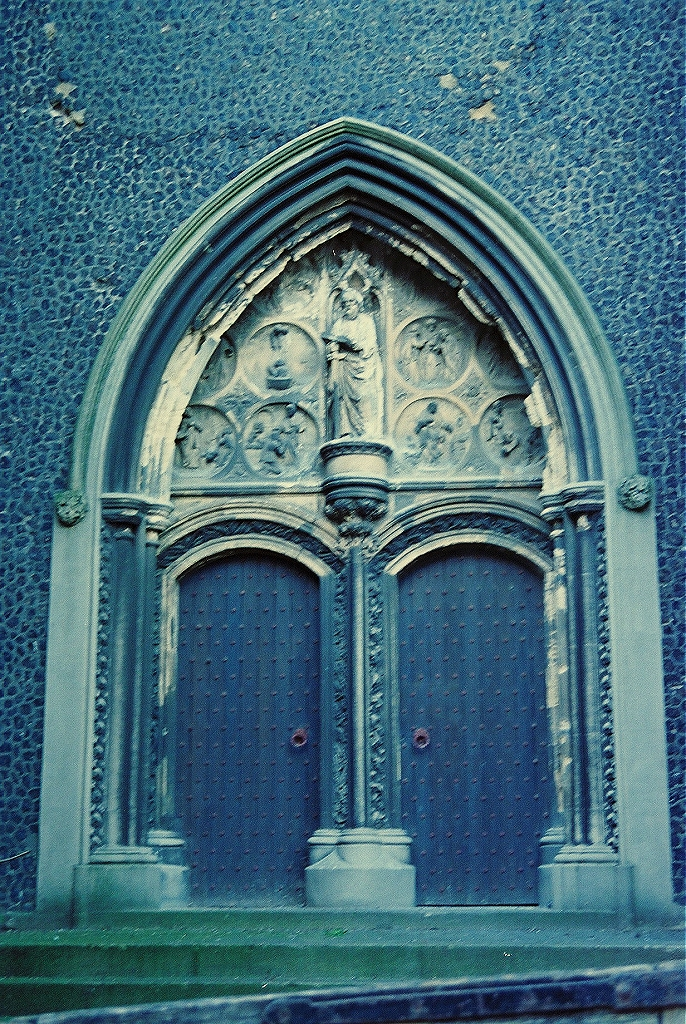
The eastern doorway facing West Street

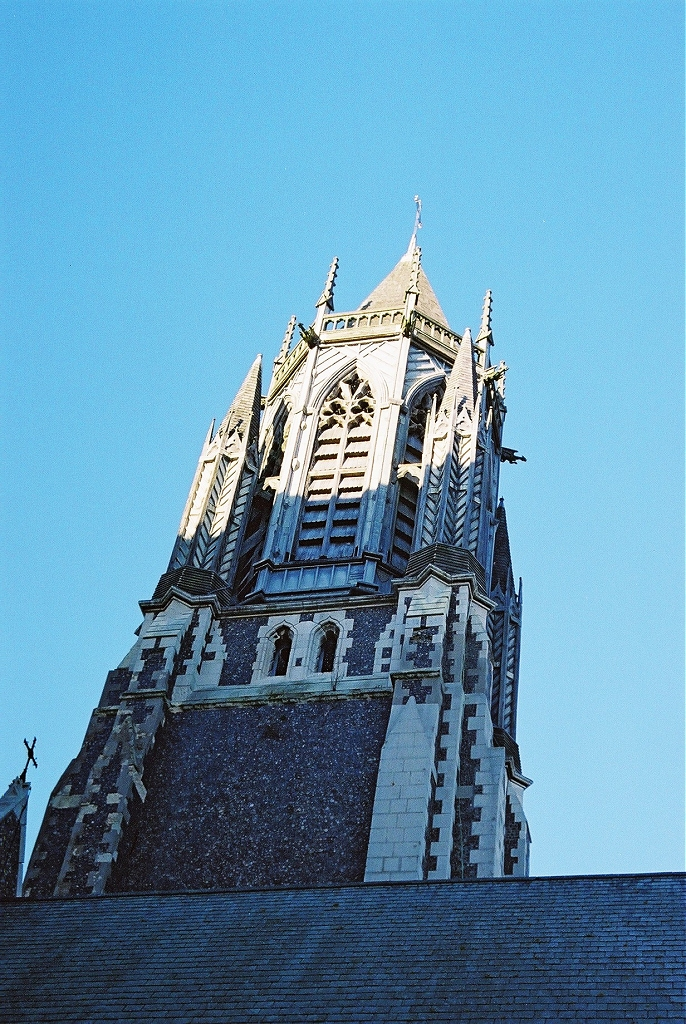
The tower from the south

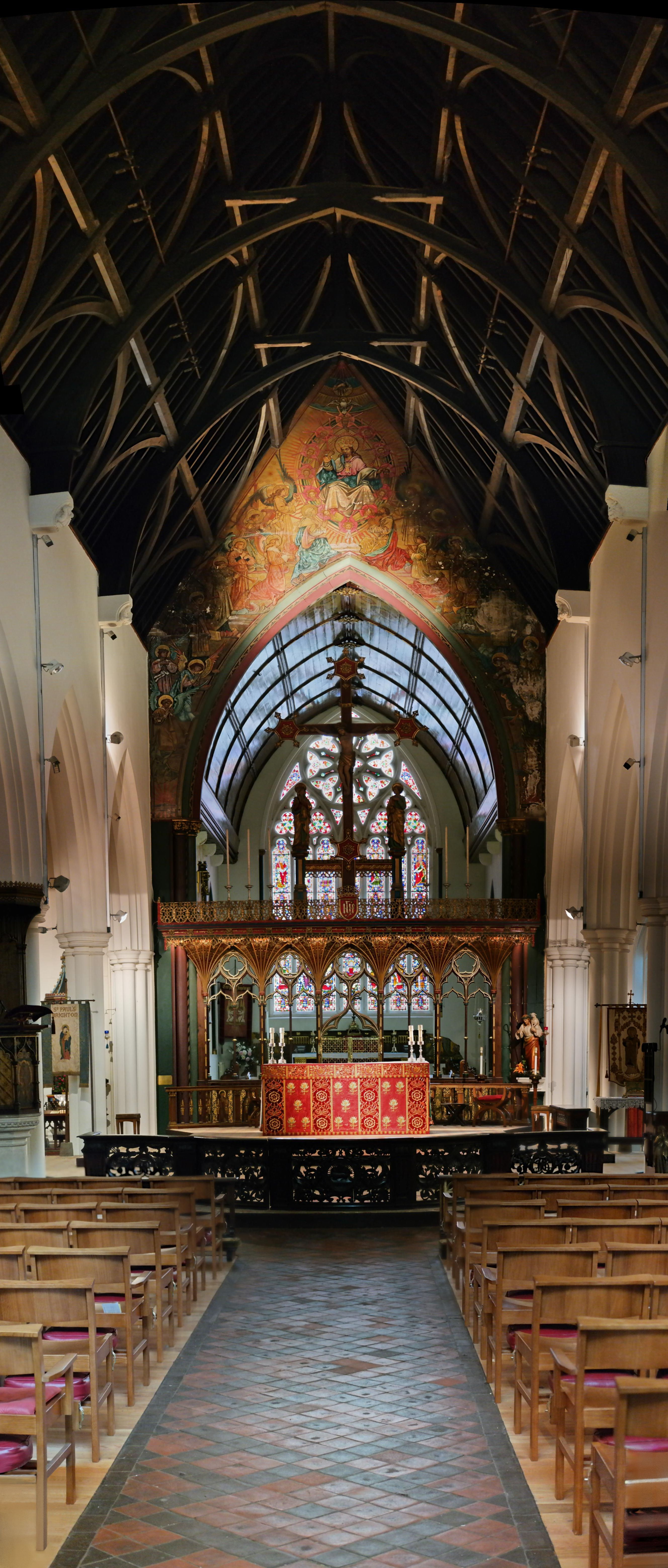
Interior, with stained glass window and vaulting

St Paul's Church, dedicated to Paul of Tarsus, is a Church of England parish church in Brighton, Sussex, England, on West Street in the city centre.

== History and construction ==
The site of St Paul's Church had been occupied since 1830 by a small chapel for the use of fishermen. At that time, many of the town's fishermen lived in poor housing on streets surrounding Russell Street (an area now hidden under the rear of the Churchill Square shopping centre). In 1846, Reverend Henry Michell Wagner, Vicar of Brighton since 1824, bought the chapel and some surrounding buildings for £3,000, cleared the site and appointed a builder and a designer.

St Paul's was the fourth church to have been built on the instruction of Rev. Henry Michell Wagner. His first was All Souls on Eastern Road, built between 1833 and 1834 but demolished in 1968. This was followed by Christ Church on Montpelier Road in Montpelier, near the boundary with Hove, to which King William IV, his Queen Consort Adelaide and his successor Queen Victoria had each contributed £50 towards the £4,500 cost of construction; this church was demolished in 1982. His third was the church of St John the Evangelist in Carlton Hill, on the edge of the Kemptown district; this church, which also received a £50 donation from Queen Victoria, was consecrated in 1840, and became the Greek Orthodox Church of the Holy Trinity, Brighton in 1980. St Paul's is therefore the earliest of Rev. Wagner's churches to remain in use as a place of Anglican worship.

== Architecture and design ==
Brighton-based builders Cheesman & Son, as they were known at the time, were chosen to construct the building to a design by R. C. Carpenter: they had worked with Rev. Wagner since 1834, when they built a vicarage for him, and were responsible for both Christ Church and the church of St John the Evangelist. However, Rev. Wagner's intention had always been for the church to be his son Arthur's first ministry following his ordination, and Arthur asked for the design work to be undertaken by a separate designer. Arthur Wagner was 22 years old at the time the land was purchased, and was preparing to be ordained (this took place in 1850). He was a follower of the Oxford Movement (or Tractarian Movement), whose favoured architectural style at the time was a revival of the 14th-century aspects of Gothic architecture (see also here).

The exterior of the church consists of knapped flint dressed with Caen stone, a type of limestone also used on the Tower of London. Inside, as well as a nave and chancel, there are two vestries, an organ chamber and a small "crypt chapel" dug into sloping ground. This subsequently became a library. One of the vestries was originally built as a reading-room; it is now known as the "Fishermen's Vestry".

== Opening of the church ==
St Paul's church opened to the public on 18 October 1848 after approximately two years of building works. The cost of £12,000 was met by a combination of grants from various bodies and societies, public donations, Henry Wagner himself (£1,475) and other members of his family (£1,263). At the time, the practice of pew rental was still common, and although Arthur Wagner wanted his church to have free seating for all, his father Henry insisted that 460 of the 1,200 seats should be reserved for rental. (The first church in Brighton to be free throughout from the time it opened was St Bartholomew's Church, for which Arthur Wagner had the sole responsibility after it opened in 1874.)

The consecration took place on 23 October 1849, and Arthur Wagner assumed responsibility for the church in 1850 when his father presented its curacy to him in perpetuity. Rev. Arthur Wagner, held the position until his death in 1902 at the age of 77.

== Subsequent developments ==
St Paul's gained its own parish in 1873, when the parishes of Brighton were reorganised. Rev. Wagner abolished pew rents at this time.

The windows of the church were originally plain glass, but Rev. Wagner commissioned a number of stained glass designs during his curacy. All of the stained glass windows in the main body of the church were designed by the renowned Gothic revival architect and designer A.W.N. Pugin just before his death in 1852, although they were constructed and installed by others. Rev. Wagner's mother, father and aunt are all commemorated in the designs, along with some important members of Brighton's Anglican community and other figures.

Alterations in 1861 included the construction of a narthex at the western end, additions to the rood screen between the chancel and the nave, and a reredos designed by Edward Burne-Jones, whose career as an artist was just beginning at this time. The reredos was designed as a triptych; in its central panel, depicting the Adoration of the Magi scene, one of the Magi is a representation of William Morris, the artist, writer and socialist activist: Morris and Burne-Jones were friends and artistic collaborators. Local Gothic revivalist George Frederick Bodley was chosen as the architect for the project as a whole.

Rev. Wagner inherited his father's wealth upon his death in 1870, and in 1873 spent more than £4,100 on a tower and bells for the church, which had lacked either a tower or a spire until that time. Cheesman & Son builders took sixteen months to build the tower, completing it in February 1875. The tower once contained change ringing bells, however they were removed after the tower became unsafe. Two bells remain in the tower, one cast in 1873 by Mears and Stainbank, and the larger of the two cast in 1853 by C & G Mears with a weight of 38 hundredweight, three quarters.

The predominantly timber octagonal spire was constructed (instead of a more traditional stone design) because of anxieties caused by the then recent collapse of the 450-year-old stone spire of Chichester Cathedral in 1861. An illustration of the church, showing the (subsequently abandoned) plans for a more traditional masonry spire design, hangs in the "Fishermen's Vestry".

A London-based firm, James Powell and Sons, designed and constructed an octagonal brass lectern which was later donated to the church anonymously.

In the 1970s, some more changes were made to the interior fixtures of the church: a detached altar was built (featuring communion rails from a church in Edinburgh), and a set of Stations of the Cross were installed, from a church in Eastbourne undergoing demolition.

== Worship and controversy in the 19th century ==
From the beginning, St Paul's Church was associated with the Oxford Movement (or "Tractarian Movement") within High Church Anglicanism. Several leading figures within the movement either preached at the church at various times (Henry Manning, John Keble) or were friends and associates of Rev. Arthur Wagner (Edward Bouverie Pusey, John Henry Newman). Archdeacon Manning, as he was at the time, in fact preached the very first sermon shortly after the church opened. Services—including Holy Communion—were frequent and displayed many of the standard features of the then controversial Ritualism in the Church of England. Extreme Protestants within the Anglican Church protested strongly against this throughout the mid- to late 19th century. The existence of confessionals in the church, which became public knowledge during the 1865 murder trial of Constance Kent (who had confessed her crime to Rev. Wagner), provoked an intensely hostile reaction nationally as well as locally, with consequences ranging from debates in the House of Commons to an assault on Rev. Wagner. Similar hostility and protest were encountered during the early years of St Bartholomew's Church, whose services were similarly Anglo-Catholic and Ritualist in style.

Even Rev. Henry Wagner was critical of the extent to which Ritualist practices featured at the church. Having been invited by his son to preach there, he included in his sermon the King James Version of Matthew 17:15: "Lord, have mercy on my son: for he is lunatick [sic], and sore vexed...".

Under Rev Arthur Wagner the Rev. Richard William Enraght ssc served as a curate at St Paul's between 1867 and 1871. Fr. Enraght’s belief in the Church of England's Catholic Tradition, his promotion of ritualism in worship, and his writings on Catholic Worship and Church–State relationships, later led him into conflict with the Public Worship Regulation Act 1874: as Vicar of Holy Trinity Church in Bordesley in 1880, he was prosecuted and imprisoned. Enraght became nationally and internationally known as a “prisoner for conscience sake”. Rev Richard Enraght and Rev Arthur Wagner's memory have been honoured by bus company Brighton & Hove: a bus has been named after each.

== Listed building ==
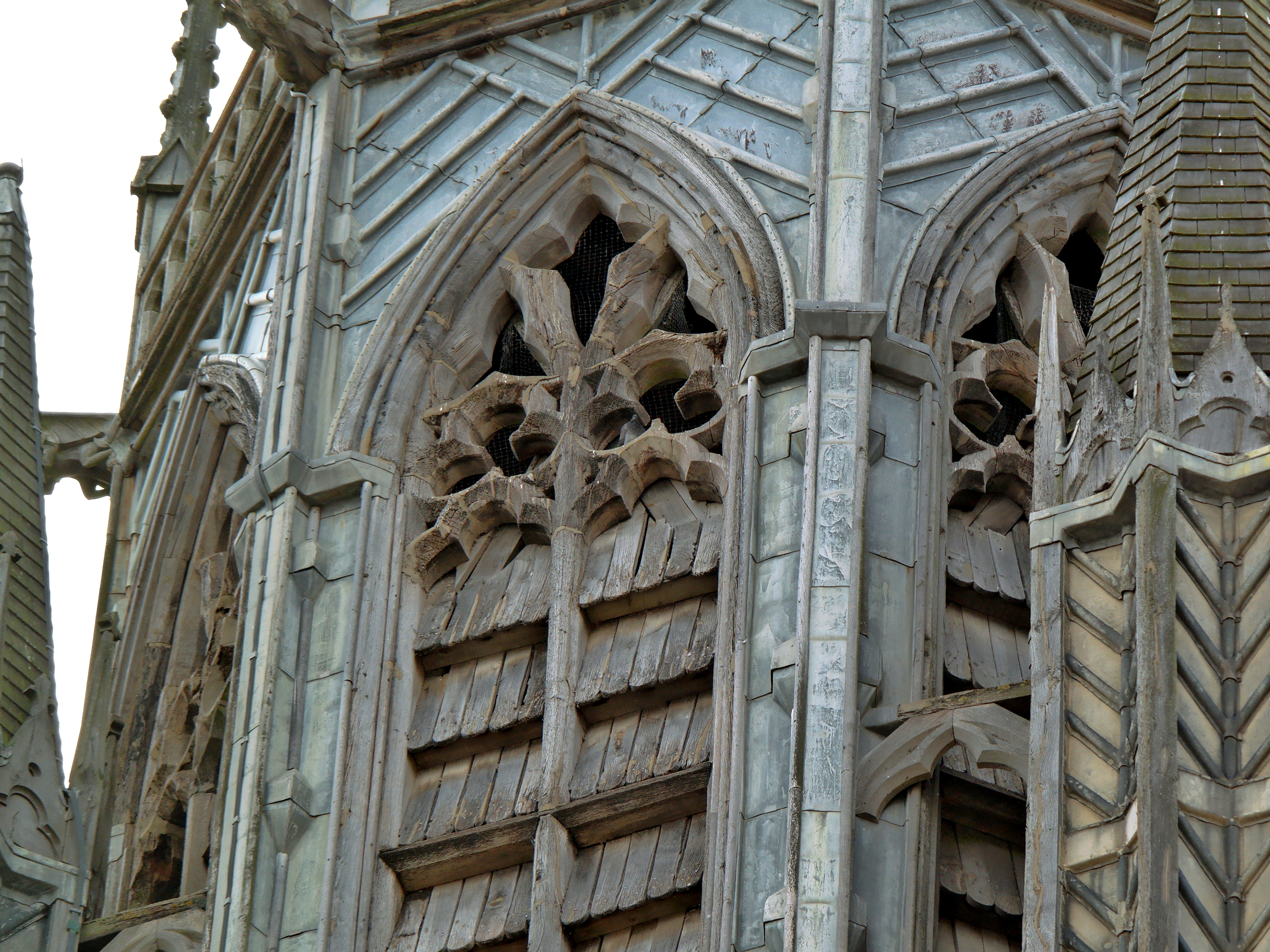
Carved detail on the wooden spire, showing patchwork cement repairs

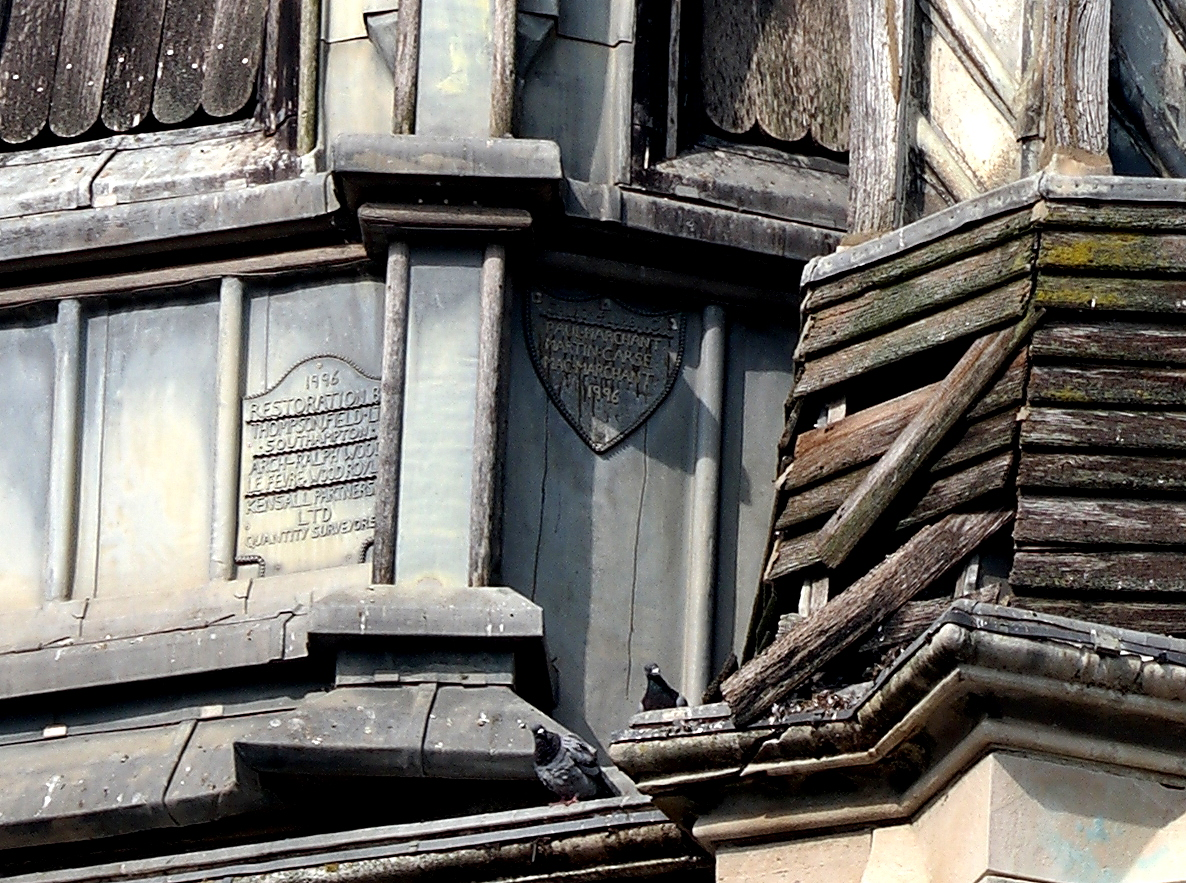
Structural deterioration (2014), and 1996 renovation plaques

The church is a Grade II* listed building, meaning it is a "particularly significant building of more than local interest". It is one of 72 Grade II* listed buildings, and 1,220 listed buildings of all grades, in the city of Brighton and Hove.

== See also ==
- Grade II* listed buildings in Brighton and Hove
- List of places of worship in Brighton and Hove
- List of works by R. C. Carpenter
