= St. Bartholomew's Episcopal Church (Poway, California) =

Church building in California, U.S.

Coordinates: 33°0′29″N 117°3′22″W

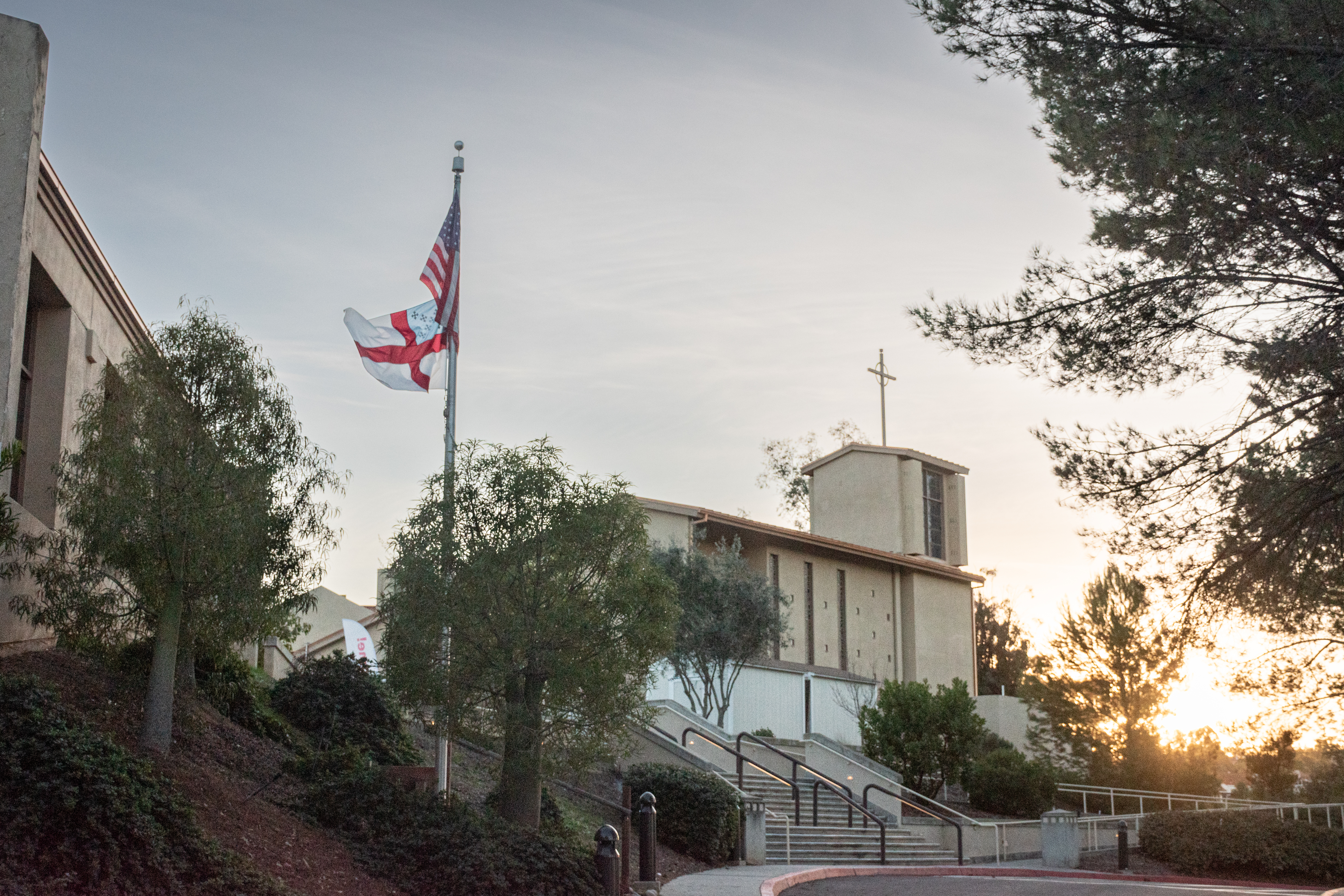
St. Bartholomew's Episcopal Church, Poway, California

St. Bartholomew's Episcopal Church is a place of worship in Poway, California, United States. It is one of the largest parish churches in the Episcopal Diocese of San Diego.

== History ==
St. Bartholomew's was founded in 1960 and began worship at a local establishment before breaking ground on the current campus site on Pomerado Road in Poway in 1968. The current sanctuary was dedicated in 1980, and several additional buildings were subsequently dedicated for administration, music, columbarium, and smaller worship. Their street banner, "All are welcome, no exceptions!" is a familiar and recognizable slogan in the local community.

St. Bartholomew's had a successful thrift shop on Poway Road for 53 years before closing in 2020 along with the thrift shops in the plaza, as new homes were built on the site. The church built the Epiphanie School in Loranette, Haiti in 2018, and continues to support it, and also builds tiny homes in Tijuana in conjunction with Project Mercy twice per year.

The former Bishop of Jerusalem, The Most Reverend Samir Kafity, was Bishop in Residence at St. Bartholomew's from 1998 until his death in 2015. The current Rector, The Rev. Nina Bacas, was called in June 2023.

St. Bartholomew's has a successful music program, and offers a music season of masterworks and other concerts, under the direction of Dr. John-Luke Addison, including the premiere of his Requiem composition in 2023.
