= St. Bartholomew's =

St. Bartholomew’s or Barts may refer to:

- St. Bartholomew's Church (disambiguation), the name of several churches

== Hospitals ==
- St Bartholomew's Hospital, Bristol, founded 1240
- St Bartholomew's Hospital, City of London, founded 1123
- St Bartholomew's Hospital, Rochester, founded 1078

== Other uses ==
- Barts and The London School of Medicine and Dentistry, a medical and dental school, part of Queen Mary University of London
- St Bartholomew's School in Newbury, Berkshire, England

== See also ==
- Bartholomew (disambiguation)
- Saint-Barthélemy (disambiguation)
- Saint Barthélemy, an island in the Caribbean, often called St. Barts
- St. Bartholomew, an apostle of Jesus Christ
- Barts Health NHS Trust
- St. Bartholomew's Day massacre, 1572
