= St Bartholomew's Church, Brighton =

Church in Brighton, England

Coordinates: 50°49′51″N 0°8′14″W

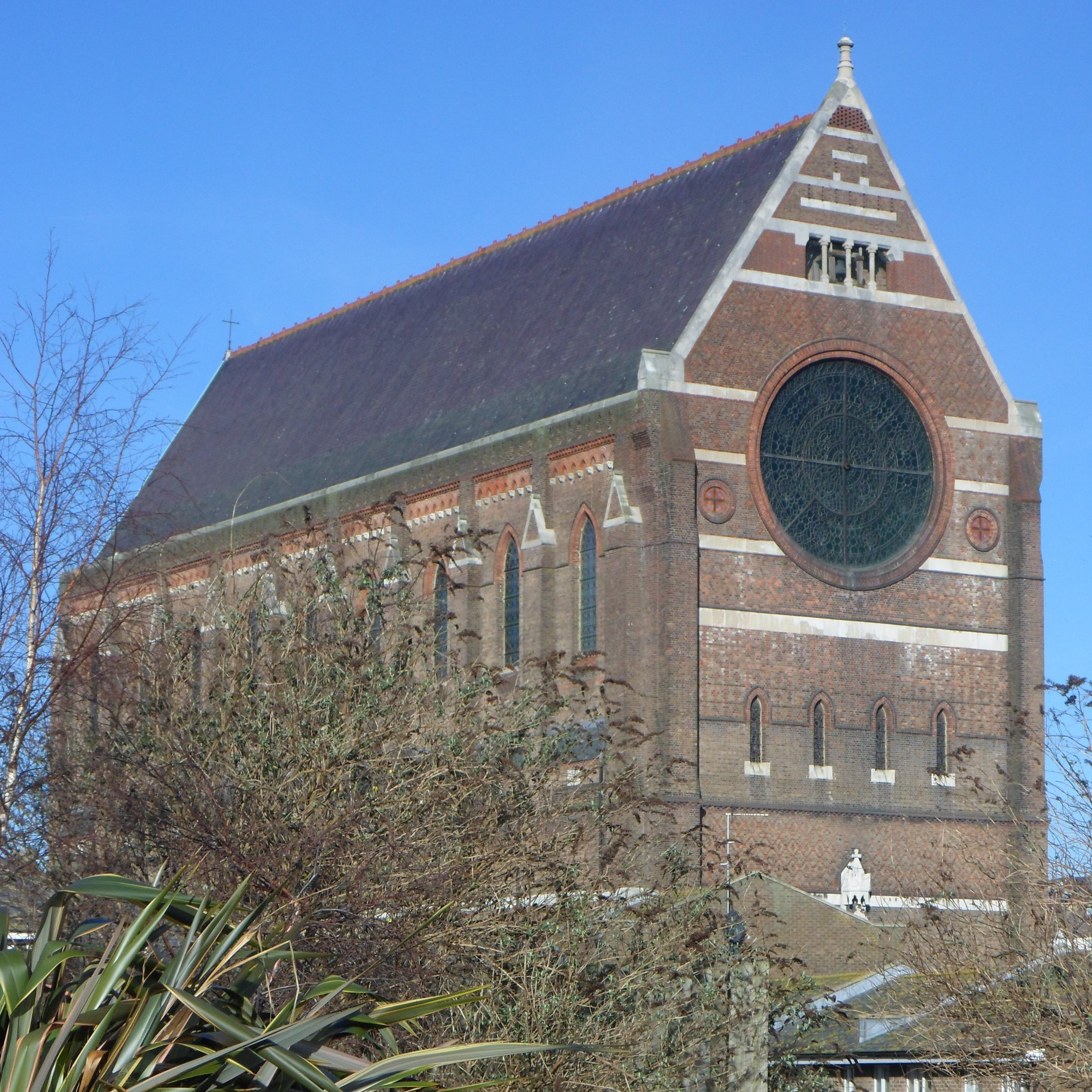
- The church from the south-southwest
- St Bartholomew's Church, Brighton
- Denomination: Church of England
- Churchmanship: Traditional Anglo-Catholic / Anglo-Papalist

History
- Dedication: St Bartholomew

Specifications
- Height: 144 ft (44 m)

Administration
- Province: Canterbury
- Diocese: Chichester
- Archdeaconry: Chichester
- Deanery: Brighton
- Parish: Brighton, St Bartholomew

Clergy
- Vicar: Vacant (since 2024)

Listed Building – Grade I
- Official name: Church of St Bartholomew
- Designated: 13 October 1952
- Reference no.: 1379913

St Bartholomew's Church, dedicated to the apostle Bartholomew, is an Anglican church in Brighton, England. The neo-gothic building is located on Ann Street, on a sloping site between Brighton railway station and the A23 London Road, adjacent to the New England Quarter development. It is notable for its height – dominating the streets around it and being visible from many parts of the city – and its distinctive red-brick construction.

== History and construction ==
The Revd Henry Michell Wagner, who had occupied the position of Vicar of Brighton since 1824, died in 1870, giving his son, the Revd Arthur Douglas Wagner (the curate of St Paul's Church in West Street), the opportunity to continue and improve his father's proposals for new parish churches in Brighton. He undertook three such schemes in the 1870s, two in conjunction with his two half-brothers, but Saint Bartholomew's is the only church which was his sole responsibility throughout.

In 1868, Arthur Wagner had built a temporary church on Providence Place, a back street parallel with the main London Road, along with a school accommodating 400 pupils. After his father's death, he resolved to build a more impressive new church in the same area. The original plan, which was submitted to the Town Council in 1871 and approved on 7 June of that year, consisted of a combined church and school building, 322 feet (98 m) in length, 46 feet (14 m) wide, and 41.75 feet (12.73 m) high. This was amended shortly afterwards to reduce the number of bays in the interior from 13 to 11½; the additional space formed a "courtyard" area between the church and the existing school building, which was to be retained.

Building work began on 8 February 1872; but Wagner's plans changed again, in favour of a significantly taller structure. When they were submitted on 16 September 1873, the revised plans reduced the length to 170 feet (52 m), but widened the building to 59 feet (18 m) and, most significantly, proposed a height of 135 feet (41 m) to the ridge of the roof. The cross on the roof at the south end (the liturgical west end) adds a further 9 feet (2.7 m) to this.

Construction based on the new plan started shortly after its submission, and continued for 19 months. The official opening was on 18 September 1874, while building work was still taking place; and with entirely free seating throughout (for up to 1,500 worshippers) it became the first church in Brighton to offer universal free entrance from the date of opening. This was not welcomed by local members of the clergy, who had historically gained reliable incomes from the practice of "pew rents".

== Architecture and design ==
A Brighton-based architect, Edmund Scott, was commissioned by Wagner to undertake the design work—although modern interpretations of the modest nature of the work he undertook elsewhere in Brighton and surrounding areas tend to agree that he may have been directed and influenced extensively by Wagner, "a client who was prepared to disregard expense" on this project. Scott was not associated with any particular architectural movement, and worked alone on most of his projects, many of which no longer survive, although the Gothic Revival St Botolph's Church in the Heene area of nearby Worthing, built in 1873, remains an important example of his work. Two earlier examples of his less grand designs still remain in Portslade in the form of the Early English style St Andrew's Church, built in 1864 as a free and open church with no pew rents, and the original St Nicolas Church School, built in 1872 and now in use as an annex of Portslade Infants School.

=== Exterior ===
The exterior appearance is unusual and severe, especially because of the building's height and the manner in which it towers above nearby streets of low-level buildings. Many of the houses and other buildings which originally surrounded the church have been cleared, accentuating the contrast. However, the slightly taller buildings of the nearby New England Quarter development now reduce the church's visual impact from some angles, especially as the land they are built on is at a slightly higher level.

High walls of reddish-brown brick, now aged to a purplish-brown colour, are topped by a steeply pitched roof with dark tiling. A mixture of red and black tiles were originally applied, but the roof was re-tiled in its present monochrome form in 1930. Running the length of the east and west sides of the exterior walls are a series of narrow buttresses with tall, pointed windows. On the south side, an unusually large rose window dominates the area below the apex of the roof, upon which stands a 9-foot gilt cross which brings the total height of the structure to 144 feet (44 m).

The building work was undertaken by a Brighton company, Stanning & Co., and cost £18,000 (1874 prices). This was in contrast to the £25,000 spent on St Peter's church around 50 years previously, under the supervision of Arthur Wagner's father, Henry Michell Wagner. The use of Portland stone on the latter added to the expense; the use of bricks for St Bartholomew's helped to reduce it, as did the abandonment of the revised plan's intention to build 11½ bays. (Only nine were constructed.) Additionally, the northern face of the church was never properly completed, and proposals for additional features such as transepts and a spire mentioned in contemporary publications were never carried out.

=== Interior ===
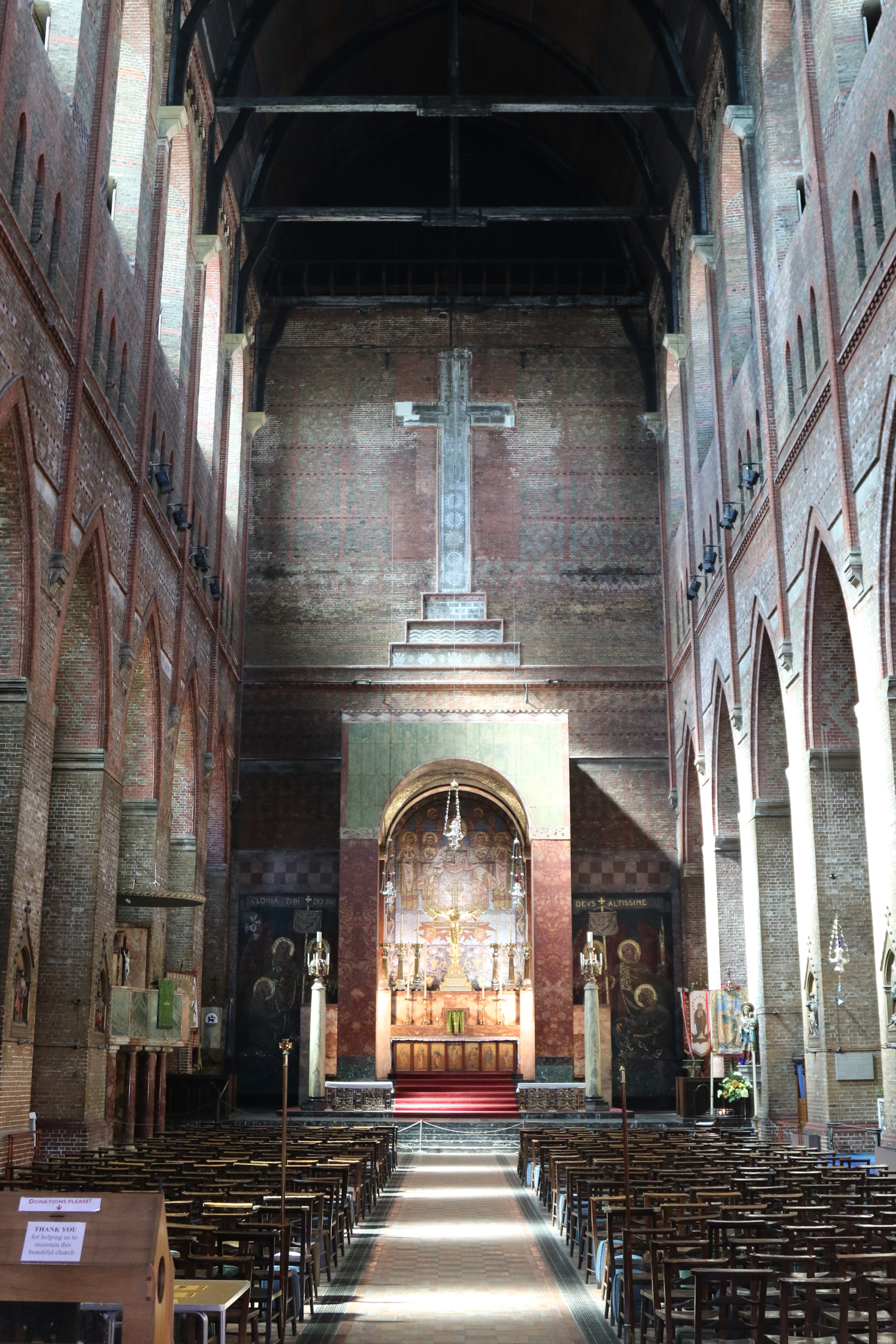
The nave

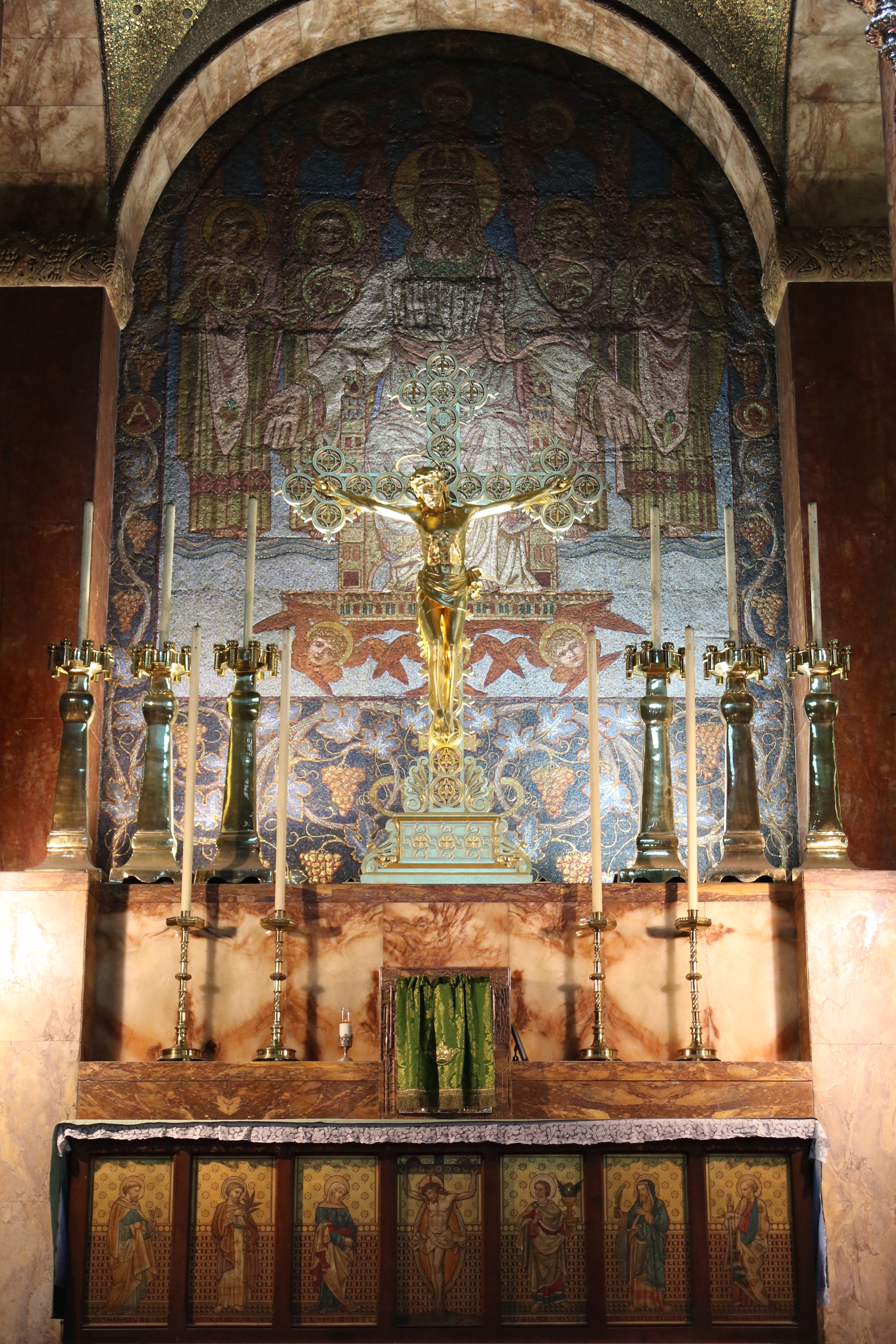
High altar

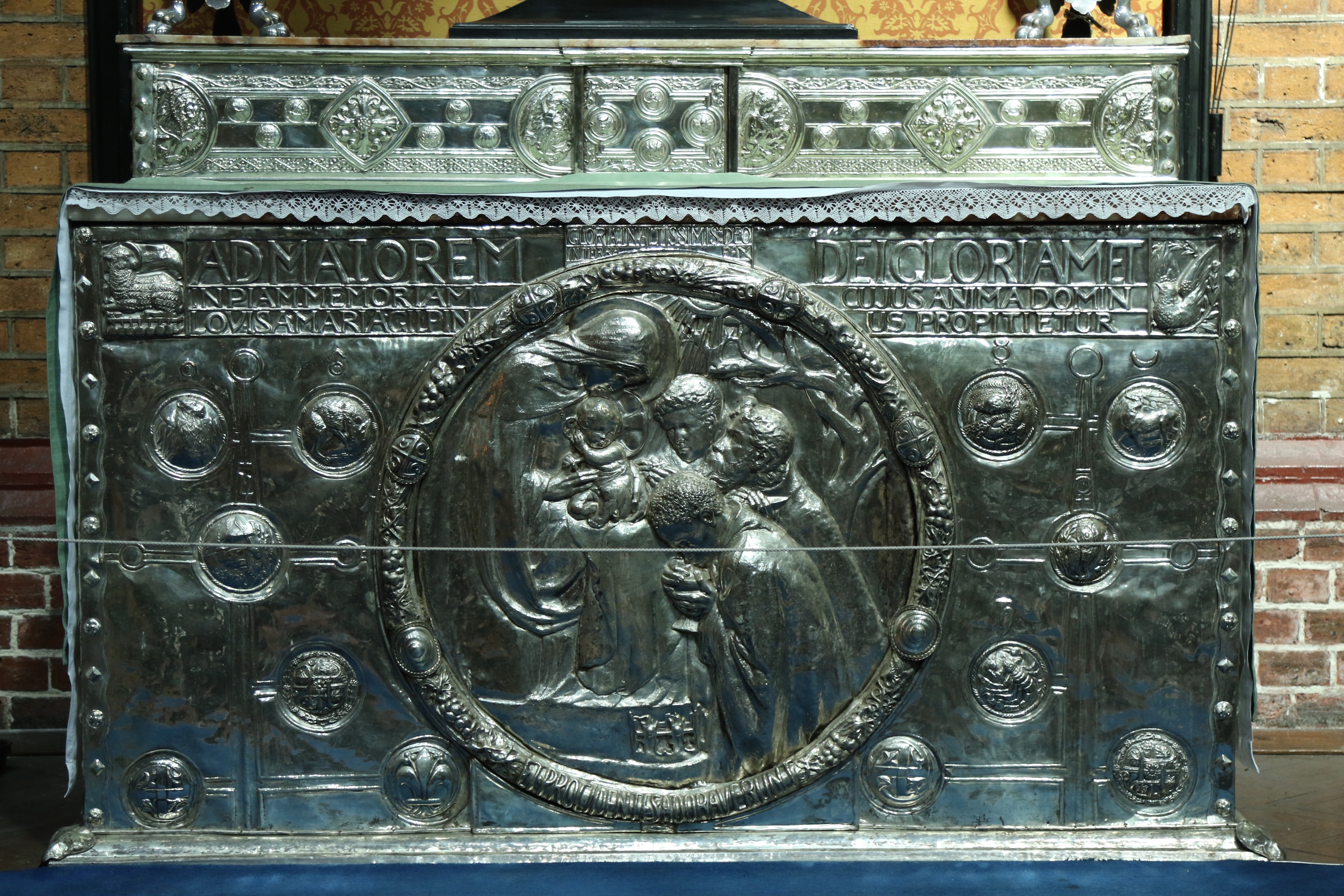
Side chapel altar front by Henry Wilson dating from 1902

Openness and a relative lack of division into smaller sections characterises the interior, giving an impression of vast space which is enhanced by the uninterrupted height: the church is effectively one large hall. Each side wall has several tall arches underneath which side-chapels are located, but these are well integrated with the nave. Above this is a shallow triforium, and above this, immediately below the roof line, is the clerestory with its tall pointed windows.

The interior walls are mostly made up of unadorned brickwork identical to that of the exterior. However, built into the northern end wall, above the altar, is a substantial cross, 30 feet high and built from Sussex chalk; and a set of carved wood and stone Stations of the Cross brought from Bruges in 1881 are located on the walls of the side-chapels. Also, the walls above the altar support a range of mosaics by F. Hamilton Jackson, a follower of the Arts and Crafts movement.

The High altar and sanctuary themselves are highly decorative, and are among a range of new features introduced under the stewardship of the Revd Arthur W. C. Cocks, who became vicar of St Bartholomomew's in 1895. Architect and designer Henry Wilson, who was the first editor of the Architectural Review magazine when it was founded in 1896 and who was also involved in the Arts and Crafts movement, was responsible for the work undertaken at this time, having been appointed in 1895 upon the death of Edmund Scott. The sanctuary is dominated by a 45-foot baldacchino in red and green marble, with a new altar below housing a silver tabernacle and a white marble shelf with a large crucifix and six candlesticks. In 1908 this was flanked by a pair of white marble columns bearing two further candles.

One of the side chapels contains a Lady altar designed in intricate repoussé silver on copper by Wilson in 1902. The High altar's original crucifix was moved to this altar in 1912, with a new crucifix of a different design replacing it.

Wilson designed and built a new pulpit, again in a variety of marbles, in 1906. Six red marble columns stand on a base of black marble and support a large block of green Irish marble, similar in colour to that of the baldacchino's marble canopy. At the same time, a large organ gallery was built at the south end of the church to house the organ and up to 150 choristers and orchestra members; and in 1908, a large octagonal font, again in green marble, is located in a recess on the south-eastern side of the church.

Wilson's association with St Bartholomew's ended in 1911, when Arthur Cocks left (having converted to Roman Catholicism) and his successor, the Revd Henry Ross, brought his own ideas in. Few of these were carried out, partly because of the disruption caused by World War I, although the mosaics above the altar were completed in 1912. The aborted plans included a second attempt at completing the north end, which was still unfinished; a subsequent third attempt failed to proceed because of a lack of funding, with the re-tiling of the roof being the priority at that time (1930).

=== "Tallest church" claims ===
Many sources claim that St Bartholomew's is the "tallest church in England", "the British Isles", or a variation on this. This requires some clarification; many churches are taller when their spires or steeples are included, and even the tallest church – St Walburge's Church in Preston, Lancashire, whose spire reaches 309 feet (94 m) – is exceeded in height by four English cathedrals.

However, St Bartholomew's lacks any form of steeple or tower, and the quoted height of 135 feet (41 m) is therefore the height to the apex of the roof – with the gilt cross adding a further 9 feet. If towers, steeples and spires are excluded, therefore, the "tallest church" claim has greater merit. Similarly, when cathedrals are excluded and only parish churches considered, the nave is the largest in Britain. Nevertheless, comparative measurements are difficult to obtain.

=== Reaction to the building ===
The stark and unusual design and the relatively opulent interior caused considerable controversy at first, especially among more reactionary Anglicans mistrustful of the Anglo-Catholic nature of Wagner and, by extension, his church. Musgrave (1981) notes that a letter written to the Brighton Herald in 1874, by a writer "who signed himself 'a true Protestant and no sham', expressed the deepest disquiet over such features as a certain 'dark spiral staircases... off which little and almost dark rooms, or cells... are built.'" The writer accuses these of housing nunneries or anchorites, and questions whether the building is indeed being used solely as a church. In fact, the staircases and "cells" are merely parts of the triforium.

A remarkable debate at the Town Council in 1893, at which it was reported that the overall height of the building was two feet higher than that approved in the plans of 1873, led to a further barrage of criticism. As the statutory fine for the planning violation was only 40 shillings (£2), it was considered irrelevant to impose it on the rich Wagner; but records of the debate indicate that a variety of derogatory descriptions of the building were made, including (as per Musgrave) "a cheese warehouse", "a Noah's Ark in brick", "a monster excrescence", "a brick parallelogram", "a huge barn", "uselessly large, painfully ugly and sadly out of place", and "Wagner's folly". (References to "Noah's Ark" are sometimes still heard today, mainly in relation to the shape and dimensions of the building.)

Additionally, residents of the houses formerly occupying the land immediately to the west of the church – where the London Road car park, St Bartholomew's school, and the eastern end of the New England Quarter stand today – complained to Wagner that the height of the church caused downward draughts of wind which caused their chimneys to smoke excessively. Wagner's financial resources allowed him to buy some of the houses and reduce the tenants' rents, in order to avoid continued objections.

== Present ==
The church is a Grade I-listed building, meaning that it is considered to be a building "of outstanding or national architectural or historic interest". Its size gives it distinctive acoustics and the ability to accommodate large numbers of people, making it an ideal venue for classical and other music concerts.

== Photo gallery ==
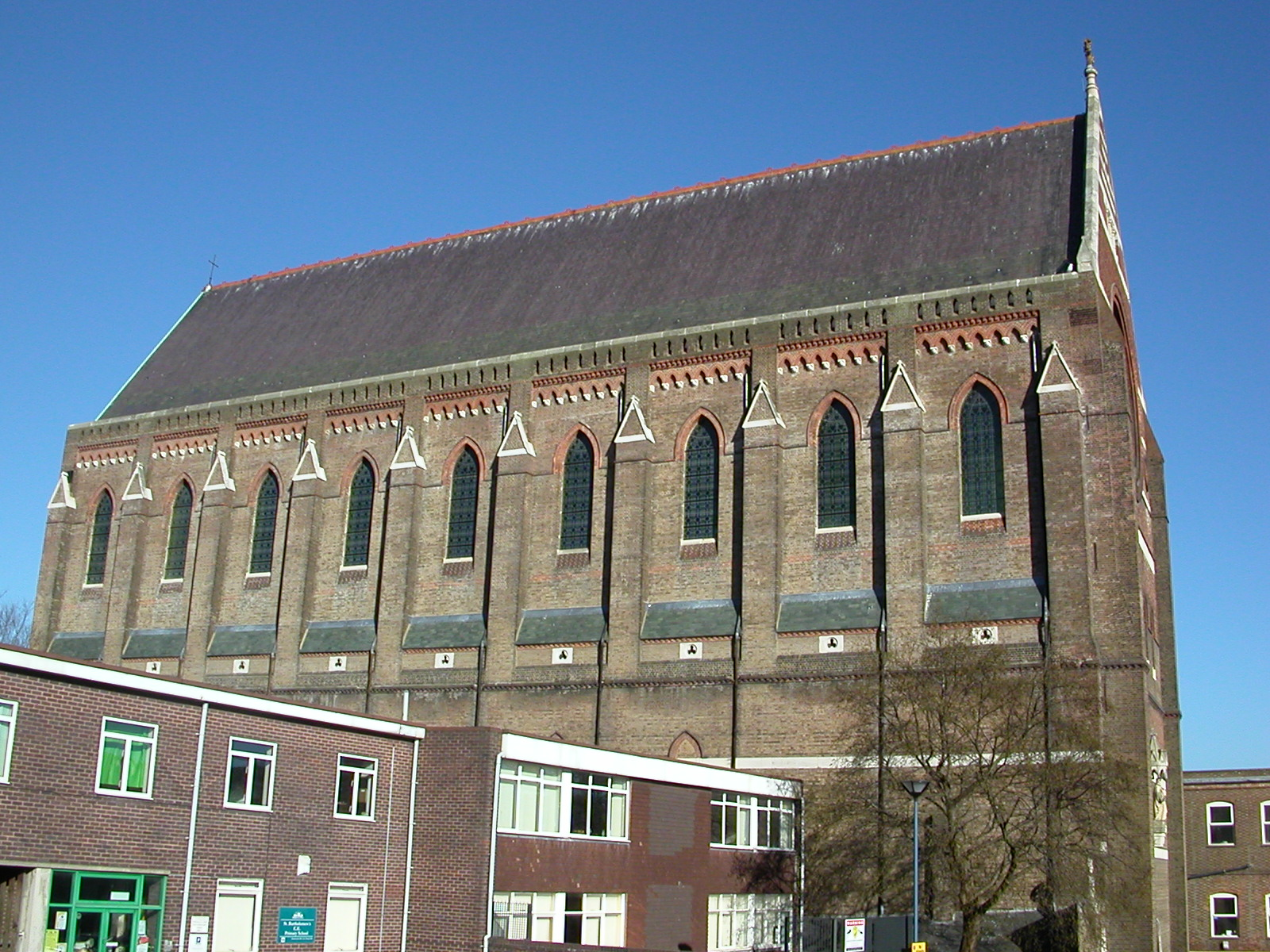
The liturgical north (actually West) side.

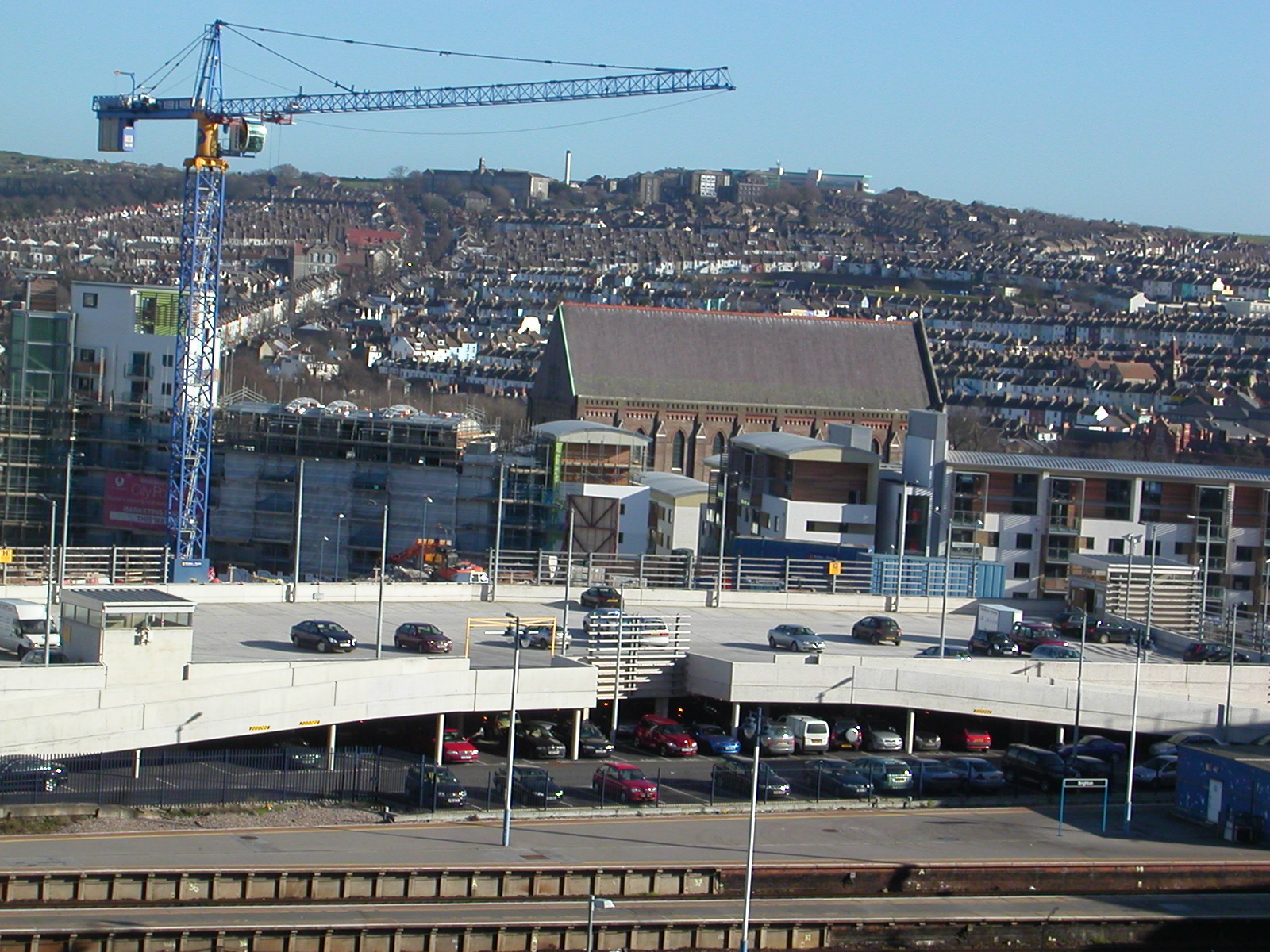
The substantial length and height of the church dominate the surrounding areas and make it visible from much of the city, although new buildings in the adjacent New England Quarter are beginning to encroach.

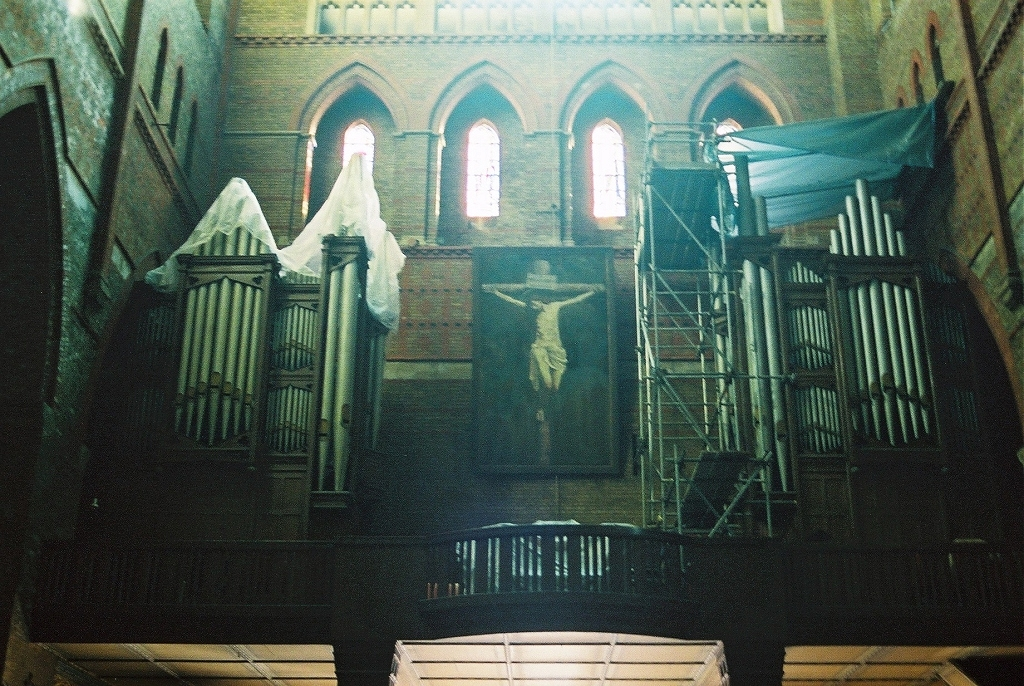
The organ, dating from 1901, and painting of the Crucifixion. Both are on the liturgical West wall beneath the rose window.

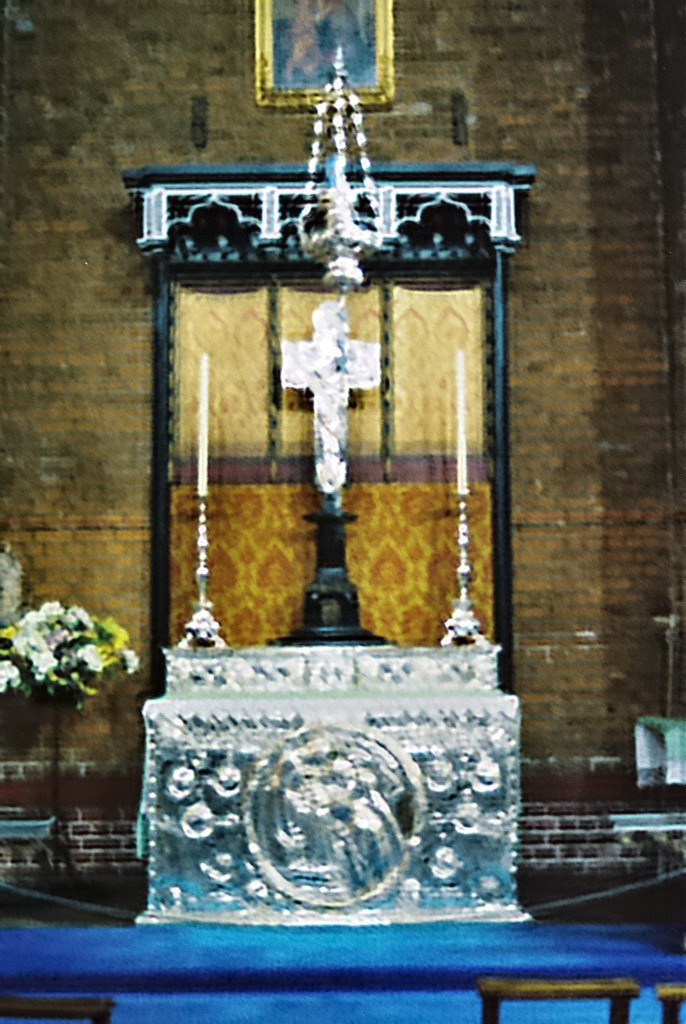
Henry Wilson's Lady altar.

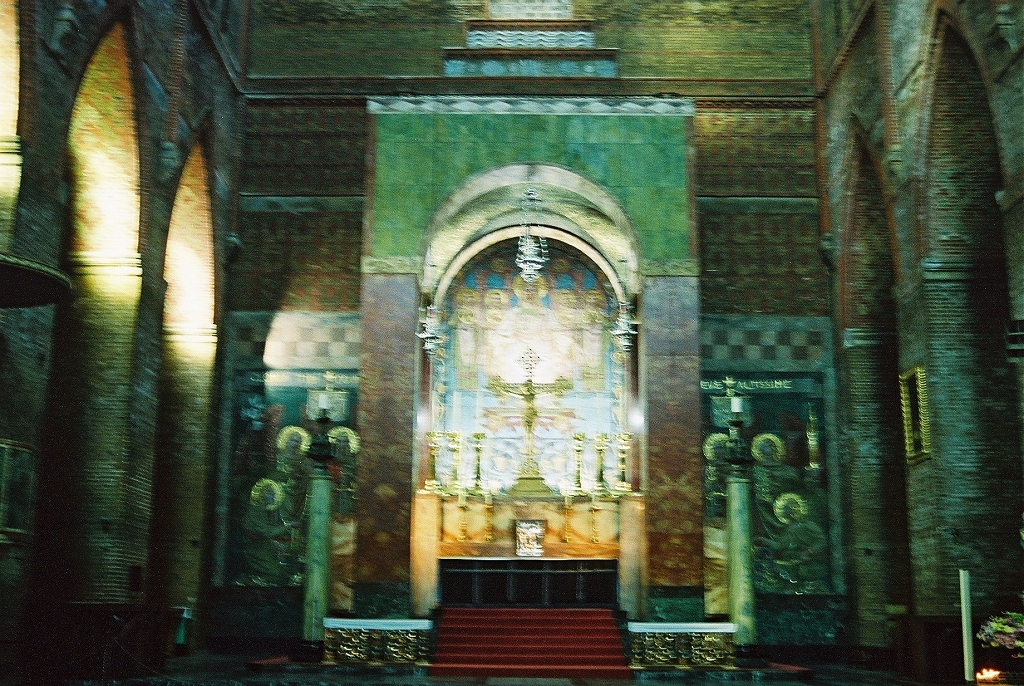
The sanctuary, altar and baldacchino, with the base of the enormous chalk cross immediately above.

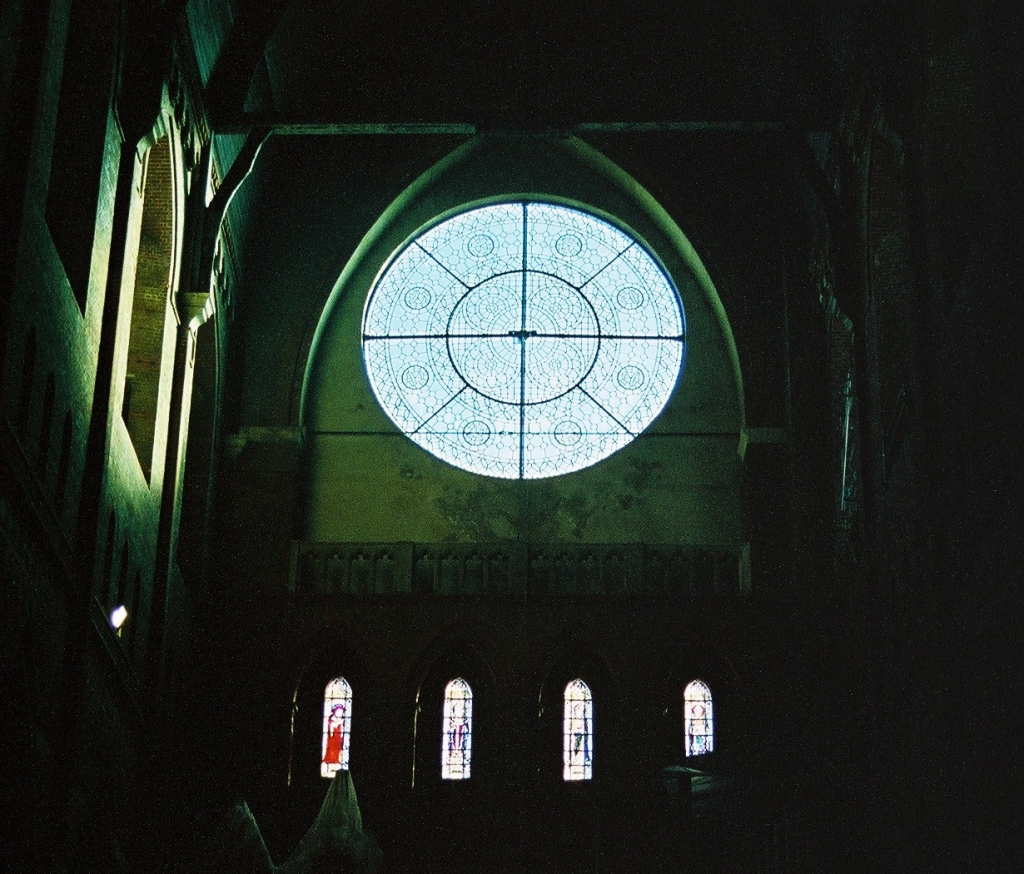
Interior view of the large rose window.

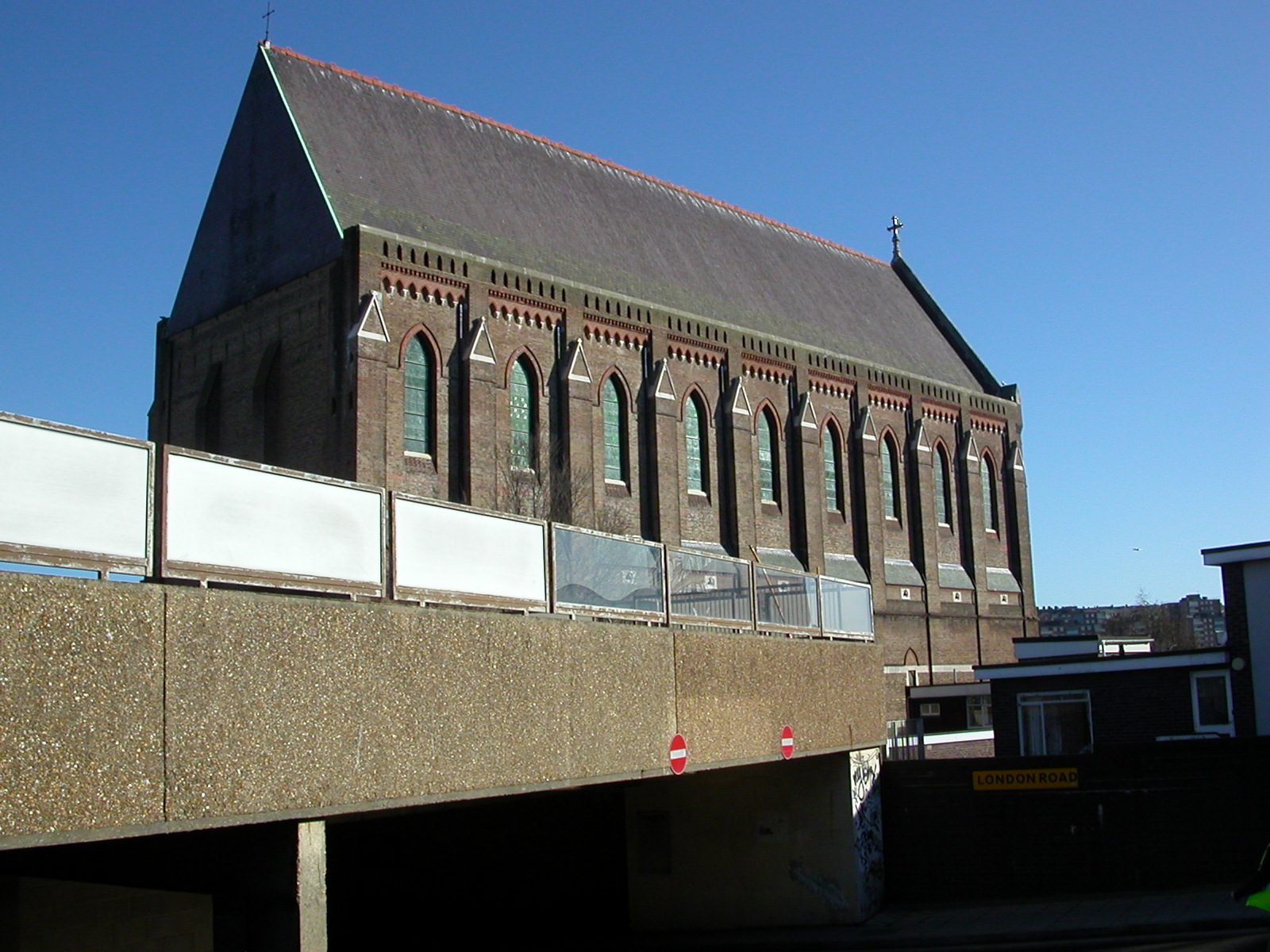
The rear of the church towering above the London Road multi-storey car park in the foreground.

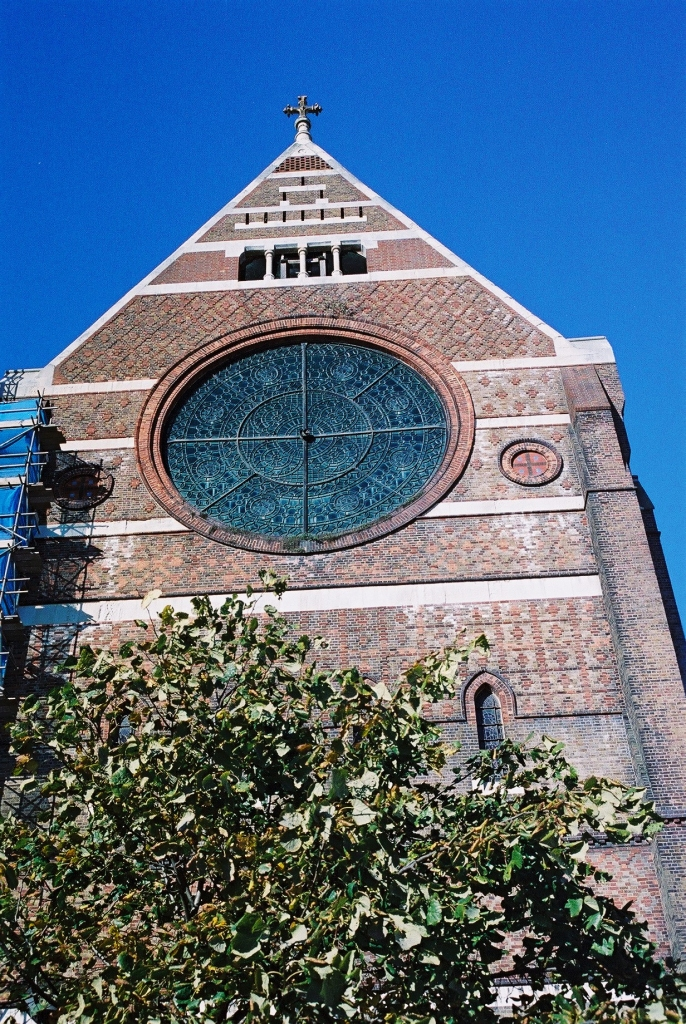
The liturgical west (actually south) end of the church, showing the steep roof surmounted by a small cross and the rose window below.

== See also ==
- List of places of worship in Brighton and Hove
- List of Grade I listed buildings in Brighton and Hove

== Bibliography ==
- Brighton Polytechnic. School of Architecture and Interior Design (1987). A Guide to the Buildings of Brighton. Macclesfield: McMillan Martin. ISBN 1-869865-03-0.
- Dale, Antony (1989). Brighton Churches. London: Routledge. ISBN 0-415-00863-8.
- Musgrave, Clifford (1981). Life in Brighton. Rochester: Rochester Press. ISBN 0-571-09285-3.
