= St Bartholomew's Church, Groton =

Coordinates: 52°02′20″N 0°51′21″E

St Bartholomew's, Groton

- Location in Suffolk
- Location: Groton, Suffolk
- Country: England
- Denomination: Anglican
- Website: St Bartholomew's, Groton

History
- Status: Parish church
- Founded: 13th century
- Dedication: Saint Bartholomew

Architecture
- Functional status: Active
- Heritage designation: Grade I
- Designated: 23 January 1958
- Architectural type: Norman
- Style: Perpendicular Gothic

Administration
- Province: Canterbury
- Diocese: St Edmundsbury and Ipswich
- Archdeaconry: Ipswich
- Deanery: Sudbury
- Parish: Benefice of Box River

St Bartholomew's Church is an Anglican church in the village of Groton in south-west Suffolk, England. It is an active parish church in the Diocese of St Edmundsbury and Ipswich and the archdeaconry of Ipswich. St Bartholomew's is a Grade I listed building.

== History ==
The present Church of St Bartholomew dates from the 15th century. The tower is older, of the 13th century. The building was restored in the 19th century. The church remains an active parish church in the Diocese of St Edmundsbury and Ipswich and the archdeaconry of Ipswich. Occasional services are held.

The church's most notable benefactors were the Winthrop family, lords of the manor of Groton. The parents of John Winthrop (1588-1649) are buried in the church. Trained as a lawyer, Winthrop later led one of the earliest expeditions to America, became governor of the Massachusetts Bay Colony, and is considered one of the founding fathers of the state of Massachusetts. (Note: John Winthrop's American descendants, who prospered in the New World, retained close connections with Groton and St Bartholomew's since the 19th century and continue to provide the church with financial support.)

The ashes of the crime writer Ruth Rendell, who lived in the village, are interred in the churchyard.

== Architecture ==
St Bartholomew's is built of local flint. The building is castellated and the style is predominantly Perpendicular Gothic. The roofs were restored in the early 20th century. The interior is whitewashed in Suffolk Pink.

The East window commemorates John Winthrop and was funded by his descendant Robert C. Winthrop, Speaker of the United States House of Representatives in the 19th century. It was designed by Daniel Bell, of Clayton and Bell, in 1875.

St Bartholomew's is a Grade I listed building.

== Gallery ==
Nave and chancel

Stained glass in the church

Winthrop family chest tomb in the churchyard

== Sources ==
- Bettley, James; Pevsner, Nikolaus (2015). Suffolk: West. The Buildings of England. New Haven, US and London: Yale University Press. ISBN 978-0-300-19655-9.
