= St. Bartholomew's Protestant Episcopal Church and Rectory =

Church in Brooklyn, New York

- U.S. National Register of Historic Places
- New York City Landmark
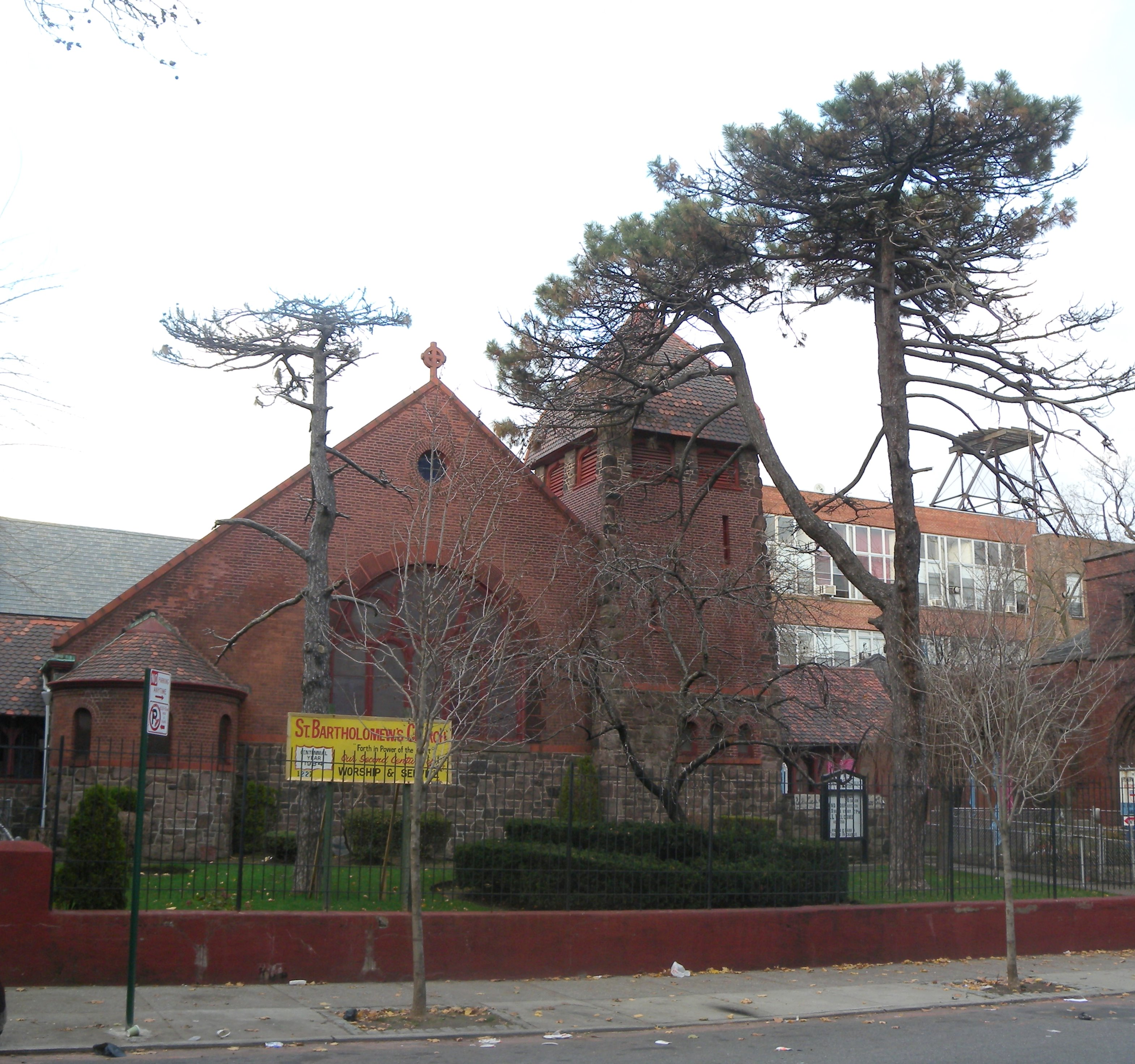
- St. Bartholomew's Protestant Episcopal Church, December 2011
- Location: 1227 Pacific St., Brooklyn, New York
- Coordinates: 40°40′41″N 73°57′9″W
- Built: 1886
- Architect: Chappell, George P.
- Architectural style: Romanesque
- NRHP reference No.: 80002639
- NYCL No.: 0820

Significant dates
- Added to NRHP: April 23, 1980
- Designated NYCL: March 19, 1974

St. Bartholomew's Protestant Episcopal Church and Rectory is a historic Episcopal church and rectory located at 1227 Pacific St., east of Bedford Avenue in Crown Heights, Brooklyn, New York, New York. It was built in 1886 in the Romanesque Revival style. It is constructed of brick with stone trim and topped by a slate roof. It features a squat, battered stone tower crowned by an ogival, tiled roof. The two story brick and stone rectory features twin gables and ogival tower.

It was listed on the National Register of Historic Places in 1980. By 2026, the site was listed for sale for a potential redevelopment.

== See also ==
- List of New York City Designated Landmarks in Brooklyn
- National Register of Historic Places listings in Kings County, New York
