= St. Bartholomew's Episcopal Church (Atlanta) =

Church in Atlanta, Georgia, U.S.

Coordinates: 33.8175°N 84.3286°W

- St. Bartholomew's Episcopal Church
- "Whoever you are, wherever you are on your journey, you are welcome to this place and to this table."
- St. Bartholomew's Episcopal Church
- Location: 1790 LaVista Road, Atlanta, Georgia
- Denomination: Episcopal Church
- Website: stbartsatlanta.org

History
- Founded: 1954
- Dedication: St Bartholomew
- Consecrated: August 24, 1996

Administration
- Province: IV
- Diocese: Atlanta
- Deanery: East Atlanta

Clergy
- Bishop: Robert C. Wright
- Abbot: Mark Flanagan, Junior Warden, Charlie Tighe, Clerk

St. Bartholomew's is an Episcopal parish in Atlanta, Georgia, which is notable for its ministries, choral music, and architecture. It is a congregation of the Episcopal Diocese of Atlanta.

In 2023, the church reported 658 members; in 2018, it reported 888 members. No membership statistics were reported in 2024 national parochial reports. Plate and pledge financial support reported by the church in 2024 was $569,240, a decrease from $820,775 in 2018. Average Sunday Attendance (ASA) reported in 2024 was 108 persons. This was a relative decrease on ASA of 262 in 2015.

== Architecture ==
The main structures of St. Bartholomew's are all modernist (or International style) in design. Architectural buffs have granted the main church building some attention, one blogger calling it a "nice setting", and another calling attention to the "bluer" ceiling of its nave.

== History ==
=== 1950s and 1960s ===
In the early 1950s, many people were moving into DeKalb County, especially in the vicinity of W. D. Thomson School, the area now known as Toco Hill. St. Bartholomew's Church originated when a group of Episcopalians recognized the need for a church in this rapidly growing community. With the permission of the Bishop of Atlanta, the Rt. Rev. Randolph Claiborne, these Episcopalians met in December 1953, to start the process. On February 24, 1954, St. Bartholomew's officially became an "organized mission of the Protestant Episcopal Church", with the Rev. Harry Tisdale (then Rector of Holy Trinity in Decatur) as priest-in-charge. In March of that same year, the mission purchased property on LaVista Road and soon bought a former barracks building and moved it onto the property. This building served as church, parish house, Sunday School, kitchen, office and nursery. Later, it housed Nicholas House for homeless families.

In January 1955, when the Rev. Austin Ford began his ministry, the mission's original six families had grown to fifty. One of the original organizers was George A. Craig, a grad student/employee of Georgia Tech. On January 27, 1957, St. Bartholomew's achieved full recognition as a parish. With communicants exceeding 250, construction began on a new church building (now the Parish Hall). In 1960, the 700 communicants spun off another parish, St. Bede's. In 1967, Fr. Ford left to establish Emmaus House, a ministry in the inner city.

=== 1970s ===
The Rev. Charles Hackett served as rector until 1971, when he resigned to continue his studies and start the Anglican Studies program at Emory University's Candler School of Theology. In 1972, the Rev. Harwood ("Woody") Bartlett became the rector, and during his tenure, the parish joined several other area churches in outreach efforts focused on the inner city, including programs at several housing projects.

The Olde English Festival began in 1978, in an effort to raise funds for a new organ. The fun and profits of the Festival led to its continuation for 25 years. After the first few years, all proceeds went to causes outside the parish.

Also in 1978, the parish once again expanded its facilities to create offices, a music department, and more classrooms.

=== 1980s ===
In 1982, Fr. Bartlett left to become the director of the Episcopal Charities Foundation. During the interim period between rectors, the parish opened a family shelter in Sunday school rooms in response to increasing homelessness in the community.

The Rev. Chester (Chet) Grey became rector in that same year. He played a major role in the establishment of Jerusalem House, a residence for those affected by AIDS. In 1988, Project Open Hand began using the kitchen facilities at St. Bartholomew's to prepare meals for 14 people with AIDS. The organization, which expanded its mission in 2000 to serve those living with virtually any chronic illness, homebound seniors and at-risk youth, now occupies a new, much larger facility, where it prepares over 5,000 meals each day for thousands of people across 18 Georgia counties. Now called Open Hand Atlanta, the organization also provides much-needed nutrition education throughout the state, and Market Baskets, which include fresh fruit and vegetables, for clients now able to prepare meals themselves.

=== 1990s ===
The St. Joseph of Arimathea garden opened in 1992, and the Emmanuel Center for Pastoral Counseling also opened during this period. In 1993, Fr. Grey left to assume the role of Dean of Trinity Cathedral in Trenton, New Jersey, as another major building program was underway.

In 1994, the Rev. Stacy Sauls became the rector and oversaw the construction that was underway. In 1995, the construction of a new worship space was completed, and the old church became the parish hall and chapel. Fr. Sauls also supervised the purchase of a new organ. The Toco Hill Community Ministry was formed to provide financial help for families in trouble. The parish converted the former rectory into a meeting place, now known as the Amerson House. During these years, the music program grew in strength, size, and quality with directors Randolph James and Brad Hughley.

=== 2000s ===
Stacy Sauls left in 2000, upon his election as the Bishop of Lexington. In the interregnum, the parish was led by the Rev. Jim Curtis.

In 2002, the Rev. Wm. McCord ("Mac") Thigpen III, became the sixth (and first openly gay) rector of St. Bartholomew's. He has presided over the completion of the Rosales organ, a full renovation of the Amerson House (former rectory), and a celebration of the parish's fifty-year history.

=== Rectors ===
- The Rev. Harry Tisdale, (Priest-in-Charge) 1954
- The Rev. Austin Ford, (Vicar) 1955–1956, (Rector) 1957–1967
- The Rev. Ted Hackett, 1967–1971
- The Rev. Jerry Zeller, (Interim) 1971–1972
- The Rev. Woody Bartlett, 1972–1982
- The Rev. Jack Murrey, (Interim) 1983
- The Rev. Chester Grey, 1983–1993
- The Rev. John Westerhoff, (Interim) 1993
- The Rev. Stacy Sauls, 1994–2000
- The Rev. Jim Curtis, (Interim) 2001
- The Very Rev. William McCord Thigpen, III, 2002–2016
- The Rev. Allan Sandlin, (Interim) 2016–2017
- The Rev. Dr. Angela F. Shepherd, 2018–2025

== Outreach ==
St. Bartholomew's has traditionally had a strong outreach program. The missions of St. Bartholomew's have always been central to its work and passion. Below is a list of some of the parish's current outreach projects/organizations:

=== Domestic missions ===
- Toco Hills Community Alliance
- Emmaus House
- Friends of L'Arche Atlanta
- Hunger Walk
- Jerusalem House
- Project Open Hand
- Refugee Resettlement
- Nicholas House
- Villa International

=== Global missions ===
- Bread for the World
- Medical Mission trips to Haiti and Honduras
- Kids 4 Peace

== Music and concerts ==
St. Bartholomew's has a large music program, of four choirs totalling 60 members (The St. Bartholomew's Choir; the Evensong Choir; The Treble Choir, made of girls and boys; and The Schola Cantorum, to sing the office of Compline). In addition to liturgy, the music department sponsors multiple concerts throughout the year as an outreach ministry to the community. The church's nave holds the Rex Rector Memorial Organ, Opus 29 of Rosales Organ Builders, which was built in 2003 and "is one of the finest instruments or its kind in the Atlanta area." St. Bartholomew's has also welcomed outside choral and music groups to its venue, including Lauda Musicam of Atlanta, New Trinity Baroque, Atlanta Gay and Lesbian Chorus, and the Atlanta chapter of the American Guild of Organists.

== See also ==
- Anglicanism
- Anglo-Catholicism
- High Church
- Atlanta
