= Saint-Barthélemy (disambiguation) =

Saint Barthélemy is an island in the French West Indies.

Saint-Barthélemy may also refer to:

- Saint-Barthélemy, Quebec, a municipality in the province of Quebec, Canada
- Saint-Barthélemy, Vaud, a municipality in the canton of Vaud, Switzerland
- A number of places in France:
  - Saint-Barthélemy, Isère, in the Isère département
  - Saint-Barthélemy, Landes, in the Landes département
  - Saint-Barthélemy, Manche, in the Manche département
  - Saint-Barthélemy, Morbihan, in the Morbihan département
  - Saint-Barthélemy, Haute-Saône, in the Haute-Saône département
  - Saint-Barthélemy, Seine-et-Marne, in the Seine-et-Marne département
  - Saint-Barthélemy-d'Agenais, in the Lot-et-Garonne département
  - Saint-Barthélemy-d'Anjou, in the Maine-et-Loire département
  - Saint-Barthélemy-de-Bellegarde, in the Dordogne département
  - Saint-Barthélemy-de-Bussière, in the Dordogne département
  - Saint-Barthélemy-de-Séchilienne, in the Isère département
  - Saint-Barthélemy-de-Vals, in the Drôme département
  - Saint-Barthélemy-Grozon, in the Ardèche département
  - Saint-Barthélemy-le-Meil, in the Ardèche département
  - Saint-Barthélemy-le-Plain, in the Ardèche département
  - Saint-Barthélemy-Lestra, in the Loire département
  - Saint-Barthelemy, a northern suburb of Marseille in the Bouches-du-Rhône département

== See also ==
- St. Bartholomew's (disambiguation)
