= John Boucher =

John Boucher may refer to:

- John Boucher (1777–1818), English divine
- John Boucher (1819–78), British divine
- John George Boucher (1895–1960), Canadian ice hockey player
- John Mycroft Boucher (1870–1948) British tennis player
- John B. Boucher (1938–2010), Canadian Métis leader

== See also ==
- John Bouchier (disambiguation)
