= Galeed Strict Baptist Chapel, Brighton =

Place of worship in Brighton

Galeed Strict Baptist Chapel
- Galeed Chapel
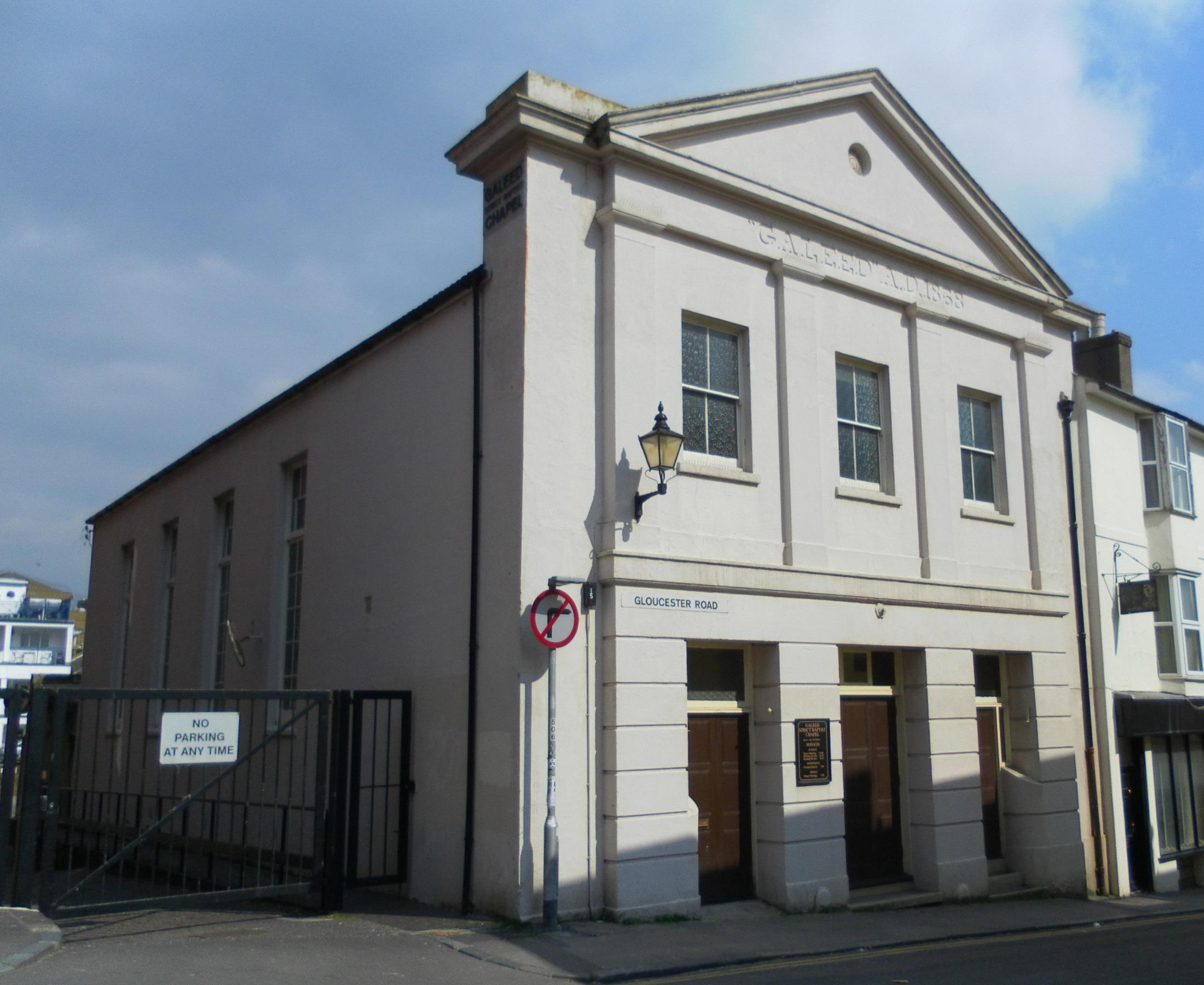
- The chapel from the west-southwest in 2013
- Galeed Strict Baptist Chapel
- 50.8274°N 0.1409°W
- OS grid reference: TQ 31029 04743
- Location: 80 Gloucester Road, North Laine, Brighton BN1 4AQ
- Country: England
- Denomination: Baptist
- Churchmanship: Strict Baptists
- Website: galeedchapel.co.uk

History
- Status: Church
- Founded: 15 October 1868
- Events: 1867: Secession of Strict Baptists from The Tabernacle, West Street; 5 January 1868: Seceders established new church at Windsor Street; 15 October 1868: New chapel opened on Gloucester Road; 16 September 1869: Church formally constituted 7 October 1870: Chapel registered for marriages

Architecture
- Functional status: Active
- Architect: Benjamin H. Nunn
- Architectural type: Chapel
- Style: Neoclassical
- Years built: 1868
- Completed: 1868

Galeed Strict Baptist Chapel (also known as Galeed Chapel) is a Strict Baptist place of worship in the North Laine area of Brighton, part of the English seaside city of Brighton and Hove. It was built in 1868 in an "austere Neoclassical" style for members of a newly formed church who had been worshipping in a hired building nearby since seceding from another chapel elsewhere in Brighton in 1867 as a result of doctrinal differences. The chapel, which has changed little since it opened, remains in use by Gospel Standard Strict Baptists and is the only such place of worship remaining in the city. It is situated in a conservation area and is a locally listed building. People associated with Galeed Chapel include the founders of the Evangelical Library and the Gospel Standard Baptist Library, several editors of the Gospel Standard magazine, and the author of a definitive history of the Strict Baptist movement.

== Name ==
Galeed is a Biblical name based on a Hebrew word meaning "heap of witness". In the Book of Genesis chapter 31, it is used to refer to a pile of stones built to commemorate a peace agreement between Jacob and his relative Laban. The name was chosen by Henry White, the chapel's first pastor.

== Background ==
Protestant Nonconformism was a significant feature of the religious life of East Sussex from the 17th century—in particular a local form of Calvinist doctrine "explicitly rooted in 16th-century puritanism". In Brighton, the largest town, several Strict Baptist and independent Calvinistic causes were founded in the 18th and 19th centuries, all of which could trace their origins back to one of two older churches: Salem Chapel (1766) and Providence Chapel (1805). Salem Chapel on Bond Street in the North Laine district was formed when some members of Bethel Strict Baptist Chapel, Wivelsfield were sent to offer assistance to a group of Calvinistic Baptists who wanted to found a church in Brighton. A permanent chapel was built in 1787, rebuilt in 1861 and survived until 1974, having closed two years earlier. Providence Chapel, an independent Calvinistic cause on nearby Church Street, was founded by a former curate of St Nicholas Church who had seceded from the Church of England and met the Calvinistic preacher William Huntington, who helped him to found the new chapel.

A chapel called The Tabernacle opened on West Street in 1834 for seceders from Salem Chapel. It was independent Calvinistic in character, and struggled after the death in 1840 of its first pastor. In 1847, John Grace—who had originally moved to Brighton to work at Hanningtons department store—took over as pastor. Grace, born in Eastbourne and baptised at Rehoboth Chapel, Pell Green, was an "open communion" Calvinistic Baptist who held less narrow views on the doctrine of baptism than the Strict Baptists (to whom "baptism is the door to the church and communion [should be] confined to those who are members"—a position also known as "closed communion"). Although employed in commerce, he had experience as a Baptist preacher: in Eastbourne he had held meetings at his house and then in a chapel built alongside a bakery he owned. He had been invited to preach at Providence Chapel for the first time on 7 February 1836, and soon became a regular preacher there, embarking upon "a ministry of increasing usefulness". In 1847, John Vinall—the pastor of Jireh Chapel, Lewes who also had pastoral oversight of Providence Chapel—"wished to make other arrangements for the ministry", so Grace decided to leave. His appointment at The Tabernacle led to a significant upturn in the chapel's fortunes: later in 1847 it had to be extended to accommodate 900 people. Some of the new members moved from Providence Chapel with him.

The Tabernacle's members held a mixture of beliefs: "Baptists and non-Baptists, strict communionists and open communionists", united by their support of Grace's ministry. He died in 1865, after which two other pastors shared responsibilities at The Tabernacle. One (William Harbour) held an "open communion" position, but the other, Henry White, was a Strict Baptist. In 1867 the majority of chapel members voted for Harbour to take the pastorate; those who held Strict Baptist beliefs decided to secede and form a new church under White's leadership. Meetings were held in houses first, then the group obtained a room on Windsor Street in the North Laine district. Henry White led the first service on 5 January 1868, and the building in which they met had to be extended as the church's popularity grew. Within a few months, the members decided to move out of the rented accommodation and build a permanent chapel nearby, for which White would be the first pastor. The doctrinal shift by which the new church was founded was not unusual locally: "many—even a majority of—Strict Baptist causes in Sussex have Independent origins".

== History of Galeed Chapel ==
The members of the new church acquired a site on the north side of Gloucester Road, close to Windsor Street and situated near the junction with Queens Road close to Brighton railway station, for their permanent chapel. Benjamin H. Nunn was commissioned to design it; he was the son-in-law of John Grace. John Marshall, one of the founding members of the church, built the chapel, and it was ready in late 1868. The cost incurred was funded by a mortgage which was paid off 14 years later.

The new chapel opened on 15 October 1868. Three opening services were held on that day; a different visiting minister preached at each. The name Galeed had been chosen by this time. Henry White was then inducted as pastor on 4 January 1869, but he died that August at the age of 36 and a six-year period of interregnum started. Despite this, the church grew rapidly during this time. It was formally constituted along Strict Baptist lines on 16 September 1869 with ten members. Among them were John Marshall, who built the chapel, and Sarah Volk—mother of the inventor Magnus Volk. The membership grew to 19 at another meeting on 19 September, and many more new members were baptised and joined the church over the next few years. By 20 October 1869 seven deacons had been elected. On 7 October 1870, under the name Galeed, the chapel was registered for worship in accordance with the Places of Worship Registration Act 1855 and for the solemnisation of marriages in accordance with the Marriage Act 1836. Five years later, the church's original confession of faith was expanded based on the Articles of Faith of Gospel Standard-aligned churches.

A new pastor was called in 1876. James Dennett, originally from Birmingham, was appointed to the pastorate after a trial period early that year, but resigned in August 1876 and returned to his home region for health reasons. This led to "another period under a varied ministry" with no settled leadership, which came to an end when James Popham joined Galeed Chapel. Born in Lancaster, he was influenced by Strict Baptist doctrines at chapels in Nottingham and joined a chapel at Liverpool as pastor in 1873. He was invited to preach at Brighton in June 1881, and was then asked to lead the church for three months in 1882. This coincided with a similar invitation from a Strict Baptist chapel in Croydon, and Popham served at both before accepting the pastorate of Galeed Chapel and moving permanently from Liverpool in September 1882. He led the church for 55 years until his death in June 1937, and was an important figure for Strict Baptists nationally in several ways. For 31 years from 1905 he edited the Gospel Standard magazine, with which many Strict Baptist chapels including Galeed are affiliated. (James Dennett had also edited the magazine between 1884 and 1890 and again from 1891 to 1898, and its founder John Gadsby became a member of Galeed Chapel in the 1880s.) From 1919 he also edited another Christian magazine, The Friendly Companion. During World War I, on behalf of Galeed Chapel, he wrote a letter and arranged for the publication of a small hymnbook, The Strict Baptist Active Service Hymnbook, which were sent to all Strict Baptist combatants. He also published several compilations of his sermons: more than 1,400 individual sermons survive. James Popham's golden jubilee on 5 October 1932 was a major event in Brighton. People came from all parts of the country to attend, and the service had to be moved from Galeed Chapel to the much larger Countess of Huntington's Connexion Church building on North Street because so many wanted to attend the service: such a gathering "had hardly ever been seen in Brighton before for such an occasion". About 1,500 people attended in total, split across two services, and the Brighton and Hove Herald reported that the church was so full that some attendees had to sit in the adjacent schoolroom to listen.

Popham died in June 1937 after a period of ill health. John Gosden conducted his funeral: he had been a deacon at Galeed Chapel for five years and had taken over from Popham as editor of the Gospel Standard magazine in 1935. A long interregnum followed; Gosden himself was invited to preach for three months, but he was already leading a Strict Baptist church in Maidstone and decided not to take up the offer of the pastorate at Galeed. It was not until 1957 that the vacancy was filled. Frank L. Gosden had been a member of Galeed Chapel before World War II and had served as pastor at Shover's Green Baptist Chapel and Ebenezer Chapel, Heathfield. He served until his death in January 1980. The next pastor, John Walder, took up his position in 1983. He had been a member of Providence Chapel at Burgess Hill and the Strict Baptist chapel at Scaynes Hill, where his father was pastor. Walder's pastorate at Galeed was affected by periods of illness and by the deaths of several of the church's deacons. He died in 2016. The present pastor, Matthew Hyde, succeeded him in 2018.

The regular pattern of services at Galeed Chapel consists of morning and evening services on Sundays (the morning service being preceded by a prayer meeting), a service of preaching on a Wednesday evening, and a Friday evening prayer meeting. William Gadsby's 19th-century hymnbook A Selection of Hymns for Public Worship is used.

In the mid-20th century, two major repositories of Christian publications which had links to Galeed Chapel were founded. Geoffrey Williams, a member of the chapel since 1903, started collecting Protestant literature and eventually began lending it to friends and other members. In 1924 his collection formed the basis of the Beddington Free Grace Library, now known as the Evangelical Library. Its remit was broader than Strict Baptist publications, so in 1949 Sydney Paul—a deacon at Galeed for 40 years—established the Gospel Standard Baptist Library to hold such literature. In 1980 it moved from its original premises on Buckingham Road in Brighton, in a building owned by Galeed Chapel at the time, to a dedicated library building in Hove. Sydney Paul also wrote the seven-volume Further History of the Gospel Standard Baptists, "the standard history" of the movement, and several other books, and took over from John Gosden as editor of the Gospel Standard magazine in 1964. The Gospel Standard Baptist Library building is in the grounds of the Bethesda Care Home, which opened in 1972 to cater for elderly people who have been "regular attenders of Gospel Standard Strict Baptist Churches". Galeed Chapel's services are broadcast to the care home, and residents can also be taken there by minibus.

== Location and heritage ==
Galeed Chapel is in the North Laine area of Brighton. This centrally located district is bounded by North Street, Queens Road, Cheapside and Gloucester Place (the A23 road). The neighbourhood developed rapidly in the early to mid-19th century as Brighton expanded beyond its old boundaries, and is characterised by terraced houses, small industrial units and workshops, independent shops, pubs and theatres. It has been called "the heart and soul of Brighton". Gloucester Road, on which the chapel stands, was developed relatively late in the area's history, mostly between 1848 and 1853. For the most part it is a "busy shopping street". Much of the district is covered by one of the city of Brighton and Hove's 34 conservation areas, and Galeed Chapel lies within the conservation area boundary.

The chapel became a locally listed building in 2015. Brighton and Hove City Council's appraisal of the building describes it as "[a] good example of a particularly austere Neoclassical chapel" and notes that it stands out within the North Laine Conservation Area because of its design and its use as a religious building. It is also the only surviving Strict Baptist chapel in the city, outlasting various others such as Salem and The Tabernacle (which had adopted a Strict Baptist theology in 1906).

== Architecture ==
Galeed Chapel is a Neoclassical-style building with a stuccoed exterior. The façade has three bays and two storeys; there are three recessed doorways at ground-floor level, which is rusticated, and three sash windows separated by slightly projecting pilasters at first-floor level. The pilasters support a triangular pediment, below which is the inscription galeed a.d. 1868. A small oculus is set into the pediment, and a gas lamp projects from the left-hand (westernmost) pilaster. The exterior has been described as "plain" and "austere". The original 19th-century interior is largely unchanged: the only alterations were in 1875, when an additional vestry and connecting staircase were built, a new vestibule created in 1974 when some pews were removed, and redecoration and new toilets in the 21st century.

== See also ==
- List of Strict Baptist churches
- Media related to Galeed Strict Baptist Chapel, Brighton at Wikimedia Commons

== Bibliography ==
- Chambers, Ralph (1953). The Strict Baptist Chapels of England: Sussex. Vol. 2. Thornton Heath: Ralph Chambers.
- Cheyne, Thomas Kelly; Sutherland Black, J., eds. (1901) [1899]. Encyclopaedia Biblica: A Critical Dictionary of the Literary, Political, and Religious History, the Archaeology, Geography, and Natural History of the Bible. Vol. 2: E–K. New York: The Macmillan Company.
- Collis, Rose (2010). The New Encyclopaedia of Brighton. (based on the original by Tim Carder) (1st ed.). Brighton: Brighton & Hove Libraries. ISBN 978-0-9564664-0-2.
- Elleray, D. Robert (2004). Sussex Places of Worship. Worthing: Optimus Books. ISBN 0-9533132-7-1.
- Franks, Colin (January 1995). The North Laine Conservation Area Study (PDF) (Report) (3rd ed.). Brighton: Brighton Borough Council Environmental Services Department. Archived (PDF) from the original on 26 February 2021.
- Homan, Roger (1997). "Mission and Fission: the organization of Huntingtonian and Calvinistic Baptist causes in Sussex in the 18th and 19th centuries". Sussex Archaeological Collections. 135. Lewes: Sussex Archaeological Society: 265–282. doi:10.5284/1085045. ISSN 0143-8204.
- Hyde, M. J., ed. (2018). A Short History of Galeed Strict Baptist Chapel, Brighton, 1868–2018. Brighton: Galeed Chapel.
- Ramsbottom, B.A. (1985). The History of the Gospel Standard Magazine (1835–1985). Carshalton: Gospel Standard Societies. ISBN 0-9510796-0-3.
- Stell, Christopher (2002). Nonconformist Chapels and Meeting-houses in Eastern England. Swindon: English Heritage. ISBN 1-873592-50-7.
