= Montpelier Place Baptist Church, Brighton =

Montpelier Place Baptist Church
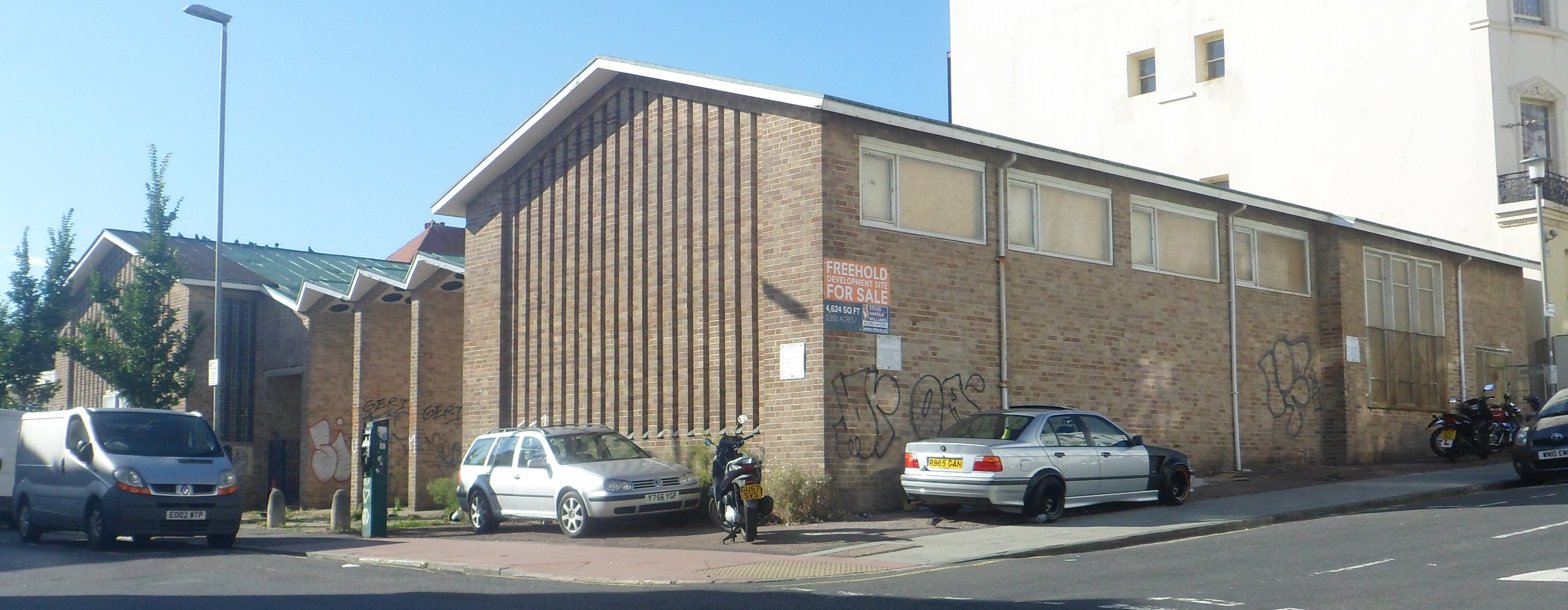
- The church from the southeast in August 2017, just before demolition started
- Montpelier Place Baptist Church
- 50.8269°N 0.1541°W
- OS grid reference: TQ 30101 04664
- Location: Montpelier Place, Montpelier, Brighton BN1 3BF
- Country: England
- Denomination: Baptist
- Churchmanship: Strict Baptists

History
- Former name: Baptist Tabernacle
- Status: Church
- Founded: 16 April 1834 (at West Street)
- Events: 1 April 1967: present church opened 15 May 1967: present church registered 12 December 2014: registration cancelled December 2017: demolition commenced

Architecture
- Functional status: Demolished
- Architect: E. Joseph Wood
- Architectural type: Church
- Style: Modernist
- Years built: 1965–66
- Completed: 1966
- Closed: 2012
- Demolished: 2018

Montpelier Place Baptist Church, originally known as the Baptist Tabernacle, is a former Baptist church in the Montpelier area of Brighton, part of the English seaside city of Brighton and Hove. It opened in 1967 to replace a 140-year predecessor on West Street in central Brighton, but was closed in 2012 and demolished over the 2017–2018 Christmas and New Year period. Houses and flats now occupy the site; the development was completed in December 2019.

The Tabernacle in West Street served Independent Calvinistic worshippers at first, but its doctrines later changed to Strict Baptist. Its successor maintained this character, and in its later years—along with another church in Brighton—was a member of an organisation for Reformed Evangelical Christian churches. Decline in the 21st century led to its closure and a period of dereliction during which it was squatted. The building was starkly Modernist in style, with echoes of Basil Spence's Coventry Cathedral—a contrast to the Classical appearance of the West Street Tabernacle.

== History ==
=== West Street ===
Protestant Nonconformism was a significant feature of the religious life of East Sussex from the 17th century—in particular a local form of Calvinist doctrine "explicitly rooted in 16th-century puritanism". In Brighton, the largest town, several Strict Baptist and independent Calvinistic causes were founded in the 18th and 19th centuries, all of which could trace their origins back to one of two older churches: Salem Chapel (1766) and Providence Chapel (1805). Salem Chapel on Bond Street in the North Laine district was formed when some members of Bethel Strict Baptist Chapel, Wivelsfield were sent to offer assistance to a group of Calvinistic Baptists who wanted to found a church in Brighton. A permanent chapel was built in 1787, rebuilt in 1861 and survived until 1974, having closed two years earlier. Providence Chapel, an independent Calvinistic cause on nearby Church Street, was founded by a former curate of St Nicholas Church who had seceded from the Church of England and met the Calvinistic preacher William Huntington, who helped him to found the new chapel.

One of the later chapels was the Tabernacle on West Street, opened in 1834. One source states that it was one of three founded by seceders from Providence Chapel, along with the short-lived Cave Adullam (1836) and Jireh (1842) chapels; while another historian states that on 13 August 1833, a visiting preacher from London had to step in at short notice to lead a special service at Salem Chapel after the minister was taken ill, and that "his testimony that day was [so] well received" that worshippers asked for him to return to Brighton and minister there permanently. In January 1834 he began to preach in hired rooms, including the Assembly Room of the Old Ship Hotel; and on 16 April of that year a church was formally constituted along Independent Calvinistic lines under his leadership.

A site was found just off West Street, the western boundary of the ancient town, and the foundation stone of the Tabernacle was laid on 1 May 1834. Building work was complete four months later, and the new chapel was registered for the solemnisation of marriages in November 1837. The building was Neoclassical in style, topped with a pediment and with a rendered façade; a photograph from the 1950s, taken after the council cleared buildings which had obscured it from view in order to build Regency Road, shows a tall two-storey three-bay symmetrical façade with arched windows flanked by pilasters of the Ionic order. The chapel had a capacity of 900; the interior had galleries around three sides and a double-decker pulpit entered from a vestry at first-floor level.

Until 1865, the theology of the chapel was consistent with other independent Calvinistic chapels and distinct from that of Strict Baptist chapels, which held a narrower view of the doctrine of baptism: to the latter, "baptism is the door to the church and communion [should be] confined to those who are members". The Tabernacle, in contrast, practised "open communion"—although some worshippers identified more closely with Strict Baptist beliefs. Disagreement over the election of a new pastor in 1865 led to a secession by Strict Baptist members, who founded Galeed Chapel on nearby Gloucester Road in 1868. In 1906, though, the Tabernacle itself was reconstituted as a Strict Baptist chapel after the election of the next minister. Such doctrinal shifts were common: "many—even a majority of—Strict Baptist causes in Sussex have Independent origins".

By the 1960s the chapel was too large for its remaining congregation, and the land west of West Street was proposed for redevelopment by Brighton Corporation. Plans were drawn up in 1960, a public inquiry took place in 1962, and the compulsory purchase of buildings covering 15 acres (6.1 ha) was agreed in January 1963. Among them was the Tabernacle, which was demolished two years later; its registration was formally cancelled in November of that year. A new church hall for St Paul's Church, named Wagner Hall after its long-serving vicar Arthur Wagner, was built on the site of the Tabernacle.

=== Montpelier Place ===
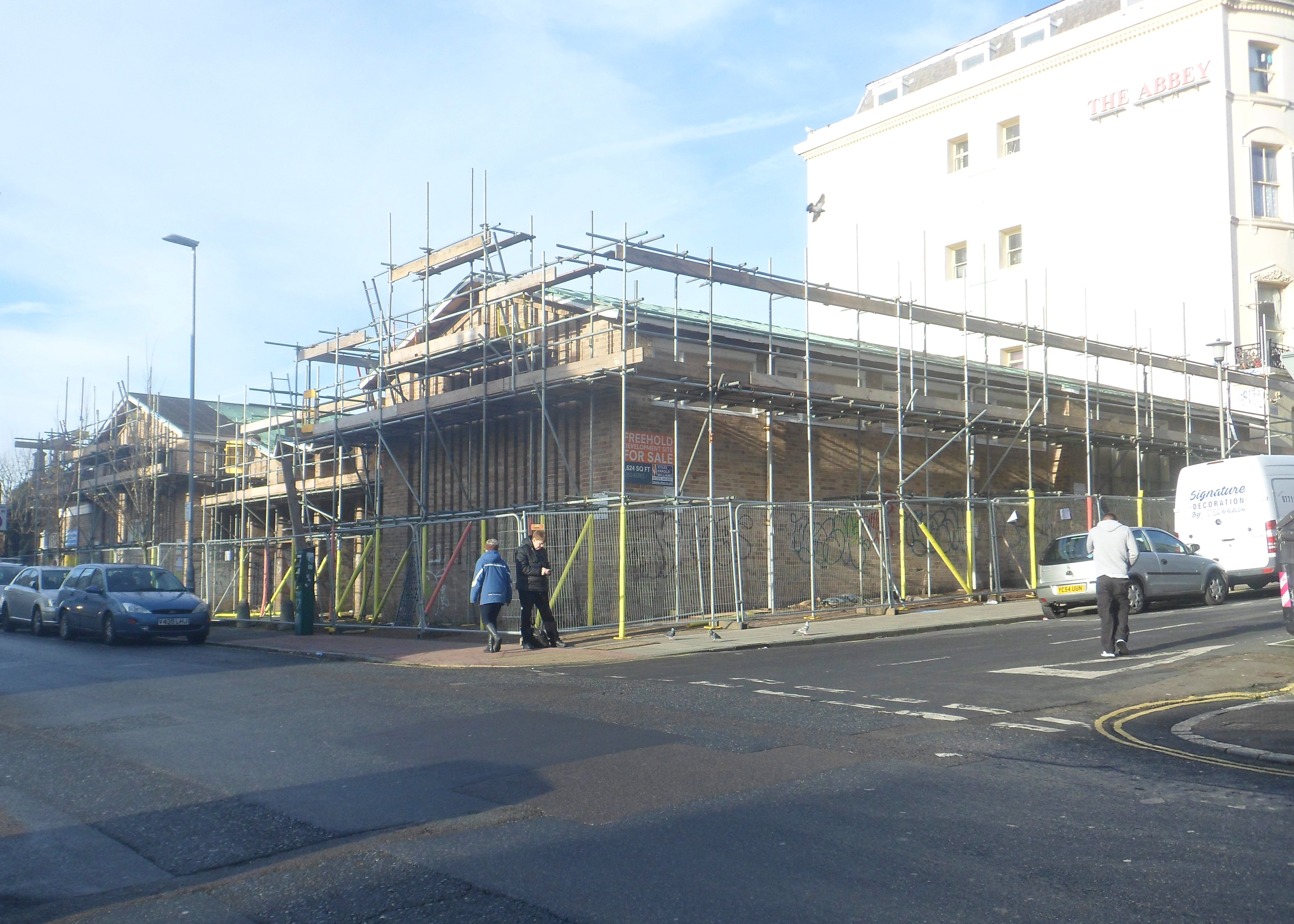
The derelict church in December 2017, days before demolition started

At the same time, work started on a replacement church for the congregation. In the Montpelier district of Brighton, on the border with Hove, a site had become available at the corner of Montpelier Place and Norfolk Terrace. It had been the site of the Emmanuel Reformed Episcopal Church, a rendered Early English Gothic Revival building with a corner tower, which had been built in 1867. This building was cleared away in 1965, and later that year E. Joseph Wood was commissioned to design the new building. The foundation stone from the old chapel was incorporated into one of the external walls.

The new chapel was built across the ancient parish boundary of Brighton and Hove. Work continued until the church opened on 1 April 1967. It was formally registered for worship for Strict Baptists on 15 May of that year, and licensed for the solemnisation of marriages (under the name Baptist Tabernacle) on the same date. Later, the church aligned itself with GraceNet UK, an association of Reformed Evangelical Christian churches and organisations, along with the Ebenezer Reformed Baptist Church—another long-established chapel in Brighton.

Decline set in at Montpelier Place Baptist Church in the 21st century. Its GraceNet UK counterpart Ebenzer Chapel was demolished and rebuilt in 2006–07 as a new church with flats above; and there was no longer the requirement for two churches in the city. Montpelier Place Baptist Church closed in 2012 and stood empty until it was squatted in early 2014. Its registration for marriages was formally cancelled in December of the same year.

The Brighton and Hove Islamic Cultural Centre, owners of a nearby mosque, had considered the site as a location for a new mosque and Muslim community centre, but in 2017 the Grace Baptist Trust sold the derelict building to developers for £3 million. In the same year a local firm, Crowther Architects Associates LLP, drew up plans for residential redevelopment of the site, consisting of three blocks featuring five townhouses, 19 flats and one building for commercial or community use. Planning permission for this was granted in October 2017, demolition of the church started soon afterwards and was complete by early 2018, and the new development (named Montpelier Place in marketing material) was completed in December 2019.

== Architecture ==
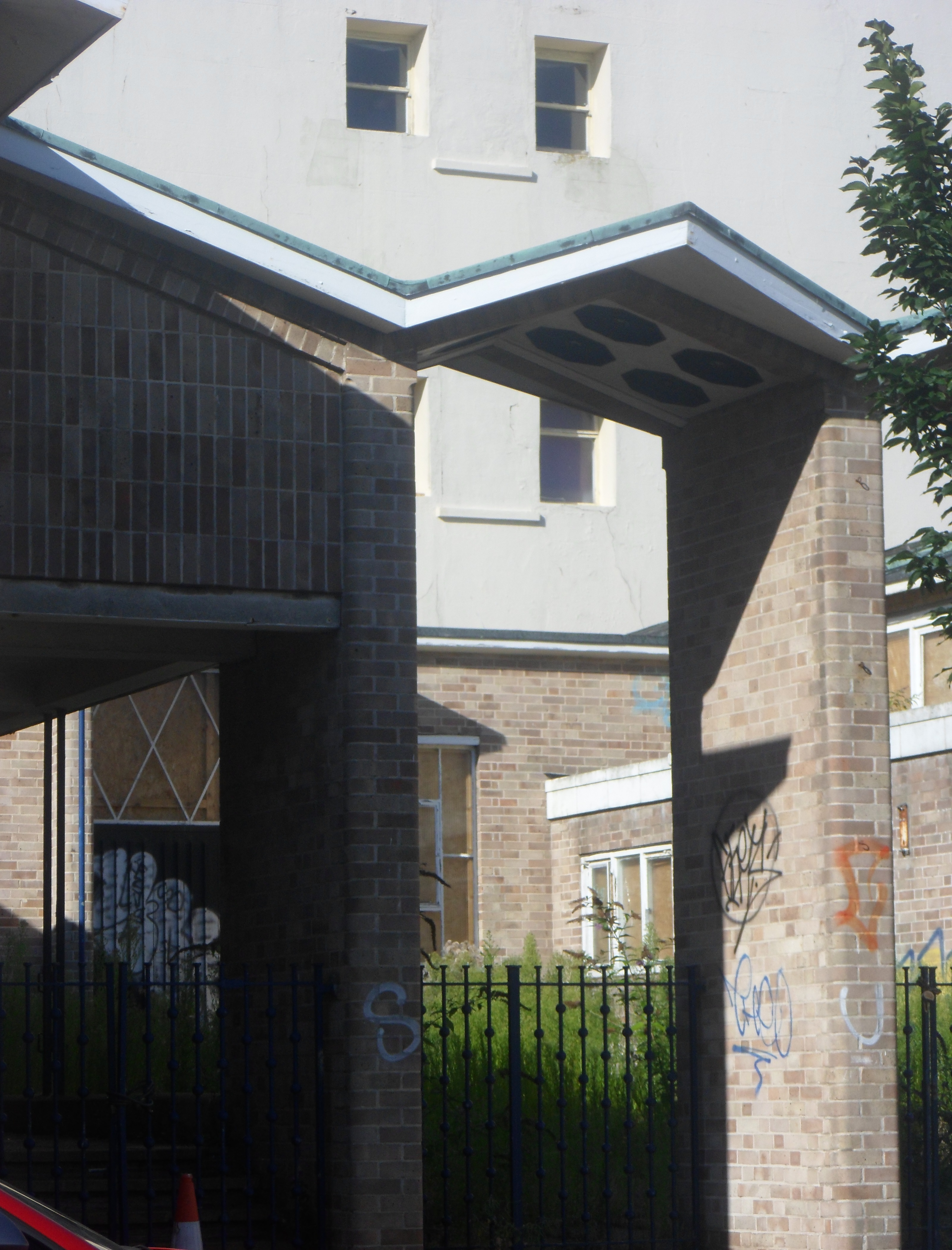
Detail of part of the saw-tooth roof and brick arcade

The Montpelier district of Brighton is largely homogeneous: developed mostly in the 1840s and 1850s, with some gaps filled in later in the 19th century, it is "largely Regency or post-Regency in style", with some elements of Italianate and early Victorian architecture. There are few "significant interruptions to the stuccoed orthodoxy", and 20th-century buildings are even rarer: Montpelier Place Baptist Church was therefore a distinctive feature.

Architecturally, the church has been described as "in isolation not without merit, but too low and spreading" in the context of a closely built urban environment of tall 19th-century buildings. The main façade of the building faced south, with a wide western bay and narrower eastern bay, both topped with shallow gables and separated by an arcade formed by narrow vertical brick slabs topped by a "saw-tooth overhanging roof reminiscent of Coventry Cathedral", which had opened in 1961. Behind this arcade was a partly open courtyard. The larger, western part of the building was the church; the eastern section was used as a hall. Both of the southern walls of these bays had an "incised" pattern of vertical bands of recessed bricks.

== See also ==
- List of demolished places of worship in Brighton and Hove
- Media related to Montpelier Place Baptist Church, Hove at Wikimedia Commons

== Bibliography ==
- Antram, Nicholas; Morrice, Richard (2008). Brighton and Hove. Pevsner Architectural Guides. London: Yale University Press. ISBN 978-0-300-12661-7.
- Antram, Nicholas; Pevsner, Nikolaus (2013). Sussex: East with Brighton and Hove. The Buildings of England. London: Yale University Press. ISBN 978-0-300-18473-0.
- Carder, Timothy (1990). The Encyclopaedia of Brighton. Lewes: East Sussex County Libraries. ISBN 0-86147-315-9.
- Chambers, Ralph (1953). The Strict Baptist Chapels of England: Sussex. Vol. 2. Thornton Heath: Ralph Chambers.
- Collis, Rose (2010). The New Encyclopaedia of Brighton. (based on the original by Tim Carder) (1st ed.). Brighton: Brighton & Hove Libraries. ISBN 978-0-9564664-0-2.
- Elleray, D. Robert (2004). Sussex Places of Worship. Worthing: Optimus Books. ISBN 0-9533132-7-1.
- Homan, Roger (1997). "Mission and Fission: the organization of Huntingtonian and Calvinistic Baptist causes in Sussex in the 18th and 19th centuries". Sussex Archaeological Collections. 135. Lewes: Sussex Archaeological Society: 265–282. doi:10.5284/1085045. ISSN 0143-8204.
- Shipley, Berys J.M. (2001). The Lost Churches of Brighton and Hove. Worthing: Optimus Books. ISBN 0-9533132-5-5.
