= John Bouchier =

John Bouchier may refer to:

- John Bourchier, 1st Baron Berners (died 1474)
- John Bourchier, 2nd Baron Berners (1467–1533), English soldier, statesman and translator
- John de Bourchier (died c. 1330), English judge

== See also ==
- John Boucher (disambiguation)
- John Bouchier-Hayes (born 1944), Irish fencer
