= Thomas Dawson (physician) =

British physician (c. 1725–1782)

Thomas Dawson (1725?–1782) was an English physician.

== Life ==
Born about 1725, he was the son of Eli Dawson, a dissenter, and was educated in Kendal, at the dissenting academy of Caleb Rotheram. Initially minister of a congregation at the Gravel Pit Meeting-house in Hackney parish, he went to Glasgow College in 1749, and graduated M.D. there 8 June 1753.

Dawson went into practice in London, occasionally going round the wards of Guy's Hospital. He was elected physician to the Middlesex Hospital 1 February 1759, but only held the post for two years. On 22 December 1762 he was admitted a licentiate of the College of Physicians of London. Two years later (3 October) he was elected physician to the London Hospital, and continued there till 5 September 1770.

Dawson used to see patients at Batson's coffee-house in Cornhill. He died 29 April 1782.

== Works ==
In 1774 Dawson published Cases in the Acute Rheumatism and the Gout, with cursory Remarks and the Method of Treatment. It suggested doses of tincture of guaiacum during the painful stage of both rheumatic fever and gout; guaiacum was then being used for chronic rheumatism, and Richard Brocklesby had previously made related experiments. His other work was An Account of a Safe and Efficient Remedy for Sore Eyes and Eyelids, London, 1782.

== Family ==
Dawson married on 29 May 1758 Miss Corbet, a patient of his.

== Notes ==
Attribution

This article incorporates text from a publication now in the public domain: Stephen, Leslie, ed. (1888). "Dawson, Thomas". Dictionary of National Biography. Vol. 14. London: Smith, Elder & Co.
