= Roger Morrice =

English Puritan minister and political journalist (1628–1702)

Roger Morrice (1628–1702) was an English Puritan minister and political journalist. He is most noted for his Entring Book, a manuscript diary which provides a description of society in the years 1677 to 1691. The manuscript is held by Dr Williams's Library in London, and in 2007 the Boydell Press published a six-volume edition of the text.

== Biography ==
Little is known about Morrice's life. He was born in about 1628 and died in 1702. He studied at St Catharine's College, Cambridge, and later became the vicar of Duffield in Derbyshire in 1658. Because of his Non-conformist views he was ejected from his living at the Restoration of the monarchy in 1660, going on to become a private chaplain to Denzil Holles and John Maynard, both veteran Parliamentarians.

Though Morrice reveals virtually nothing about himself in his diaries, his Entring Book is a particularly useful source document for London life and politics from the late 1670s to the early 1690s – as informative, in its own way, as the better known Diaries of Samuel Pepys. Morrice himself was a puritan clergyman who became a close associate of those opposed to the forms of absolute government favoured by the later Stuart kings, Charles II and his brother and successor, the Catholic James II. Most of the early part of the Entring Book is concerned with the possible impact of resurgent Catholicism on English liberties. For Morrice, the Tories, the party of the Court, were not so much a rival to the Whigs, with whom he identified, but 'conspiracy against the Reformed interest.' After the Glorious Revolution of 1688, in which James was replaced by William III and Mary II, Morrice is anxious to detect signs of Jacobitism in the ranks of those whom he refers to as 'the hierarchical party.'

Besides high politics, Morrice's journal has a lot to say about other aspects of contemporary life: from military and legal affairs, to printing, firework carnivals, storms, hurricanes, duels, executions, suicides and many other similar delights.
