= John Boucher (1819–1878) =

Irish Unitarian and Anglican

- Born: John Boucher; 1819; Moneyrea, County Down, Ireland
- Died: 12 March 1878; England
- Occupation: Divine

John Boucher (1819–1878), was a divine from County Down, Ireland.

== Early life and family ==
Boucher was born in 1819, was the son of a tenant-farmer in Moneyrea, County Down. Intended for the Unitarian ministry (in accordance with the theological views of his parents), he was carefully educated, and in 1837 was sent to the Belfast Academy, then under Drs. Montgomery and J. Scott Porter. He married Louise, a daughter of Ebenezer Johnston, of Stamford Hill, London.

== Career ==
Leaving the academy in 1842, Boucher became minister at Southport, next at Glasgow, and finally, in 1848 at the New Gravel Pit Chapel, Hackney, where for five years his fervor and eloquence drew full congregations from all parts of the metropolis. In 1850 Boucher published a sermon on 'The Present Religious Crisis,' and the 'Inquirer' speaks of another of the same year on 'Papal Aggression.' About this time Boucher adopted rationalistic views.

== Resignation ==
But he soon afterwards changed his opinions again, resigned his pulpit in 1853, and entered himself at St. John's, Cambridge, to read for Anglican orders. He proceeded B.A. in 1857 and it was hoped that he would have a brilliant career in the establishment, but his health failed, he left Cambridge, and leading the life of a thorough invalid in the neighborhood, at Chesterton, for many years. He was one of the trustees of Dr Williams's Library, till his conversion caused him to resign, and he was a member of the Presbyterian board, visiting Carmarthen College.

== Death ==
He died 12 March 1878 at the age of 59.
