= Gravel Pit Chapel =

Coordinates: 51.5468°N 0.0507°W

The Gravel Pit Chapel was established in 1715–1716 (310 years ago) in Hackney, then just outside London, for a Nonconformist congregation, which by the early 19th century began to identify itself as Unitarian. In 1809 the congregation moved to the New Gravel Pit Chapel nearby, while its old premises were taken over by Congregationalists. The New Gravel Pit Chapel was closed and demolished in 1969 (57 years ago).

== History ==
The Gravel Pit Chapel was established in 1715–1716 in Hackney, then a village north-east of London, for a Presbyterian congregation seceding from that of John Barker, after the death of Matthew Henry. It took its name from the gravel pit near the bowling green in Mare Street.

In 1809 the congregation moved to new premises in Paradise Place in 1809, and began to identify itself as Unitarian. The original building, from then on known as the "Old Gravel Pit Chapel", was taken over by Congregationalists.

The site of the Old Gravel Pit Chapel on Chatham Place still exists; in 2004 the site was in use as a shoe factory, and by 2013 was a branch of Aquascutum.

The New Gravel Pit Chapel was described in 1908 as being at the west end of Retreat Place, a row of almshouses. It was rebuilt in a Gothic style in 1857, and remained in use until it was damaged during the Blitz in 1940. The congregation continued to meet in Aspland Hall (the Chapel's church hall, erected in 1912) where they largely remained even when repairs to the Chapel were completed in 1953, due to the cost of heating the Chapel. The last service in the repaired chapel was a 300th anniversary foundation commemoration held on 2 October 1966. The Greater London Council purchased the site and demolished the Chapel in 1969, in order to build flats. The burial ground survives and includes historical references to some of the people buried in the grounds.

=== Original Gravel Pit congregation ===
The Mare Lane congregation went back to William Bates (1668).

- 1716 Daniel Mayo and George Smith or Smyth
- 1723–1747? George Smith alone
- 1747 Thomas Mole
- 1754–1758 Thomas Dawson
- Timothy Laugher, died 1769
- 1770–1791 Richard Price
- To 1792 Thomas Morgan
- 1791–1794 Joseph Priestley
- 1793–1794 Michael Maurice
- 1794–1805 Thomas Belsham
- 1805 Robert Aspland

=== New Gravel Pit Chapel ===
The Unitarian New Gravel Pit congregation first met on 4 November 1810, in a new building designed by the architect Edmund Aikin, nephew of Anna Letitia Barbauld, who provided his services without charge. It included Charles Hennell, David Ricardo and Daniel Whittle Harvey.

- 1810–1845 Robert Aspland
- 1843–1846 Thomas Sadler
- 1847–1852 John Boucher
- 1853–1857 Thomas Lethbridge Marshall

In 1858 the chapel was rebuilt in a Dissenting Gothic style, to the designs of Arthur Ashpitel.

- 1858–1869 Robert Brook Aspland
- 1870–1891 James Thornely Whitehead
- 1893 Samuel Fletcher Williams.

=== Old Gravel Pit Chapel (Congregationalist) ===
In 1810 a congregationalist group, who had seceded from the Ram's Chapel in Homerton after the death of John Eyre, leased the old Gravel Pit Chapel, then in Morning Lane, Hackney. They had gathered from 1804 at Homerton College.

- 1811–1850 John Pye Smith
- John Davies
- J. De K. Williams.

The last service in the Old Gravel Pit Chapel was held in 1871. The congregation moved to the new Round Chapel, on the Clapton Park Estate, in Upper Clapton. From 1874 there was an Old Gravel Pit mission in the building.
