= Evangelical Library =

Library in North London with research collections for Christian theology

- 51.60998316062516°N 0.1338320379610016°W
- Location: London, England
- Established: 1938

Other information
- Website: http://www.evangelical-library.org.uk/

The Evangelical Library in Bounds Green, London, is a lending library for Christian ministers, students and other lay-persons. For many years the library was located on Chiltern Street in central London. It moved to North London in mid-2009.

The Library was founded through the vision of Geoffrey Williams (1886–1975) to be a library that offered the very best of Protestant evangelical resources. In this aim he was much encouraged in 1938 by the then associate minister of Westminster Chapel, Dr Martyn Lloyd-Jones. Before the move in 1944 to its Chiltern Street location close to Baker Street Underground station, it was known as the Beddington Free Grace Library, based in the tiny village of Beddington, Surrey.

The library is home to more than 80,000 evangelical books. It also has an extensive archive of several evangelical periodicals. It hosts an annual lecture and publishes a regular magazine called In Writing (formerly known as The Evangelical Library Bulletin).

Following a major refurbishment in 2005, the library now has a reference room, known as the Robert Sheehan Puritan and Research Centre, named in honour of the late Robert J. Sheehan (1951–97), the former pastor of Welwyn Evangelical Church.

It has links with a number of similar libraries worldwide, which it also supports.

== See also ==
- Dr Williams's Library, London
- St Deiniol's Library, Hawarden
