= Dr Williams's Library =

English research library in London, England

Coordinates: 51.5240°N 0.1315°W

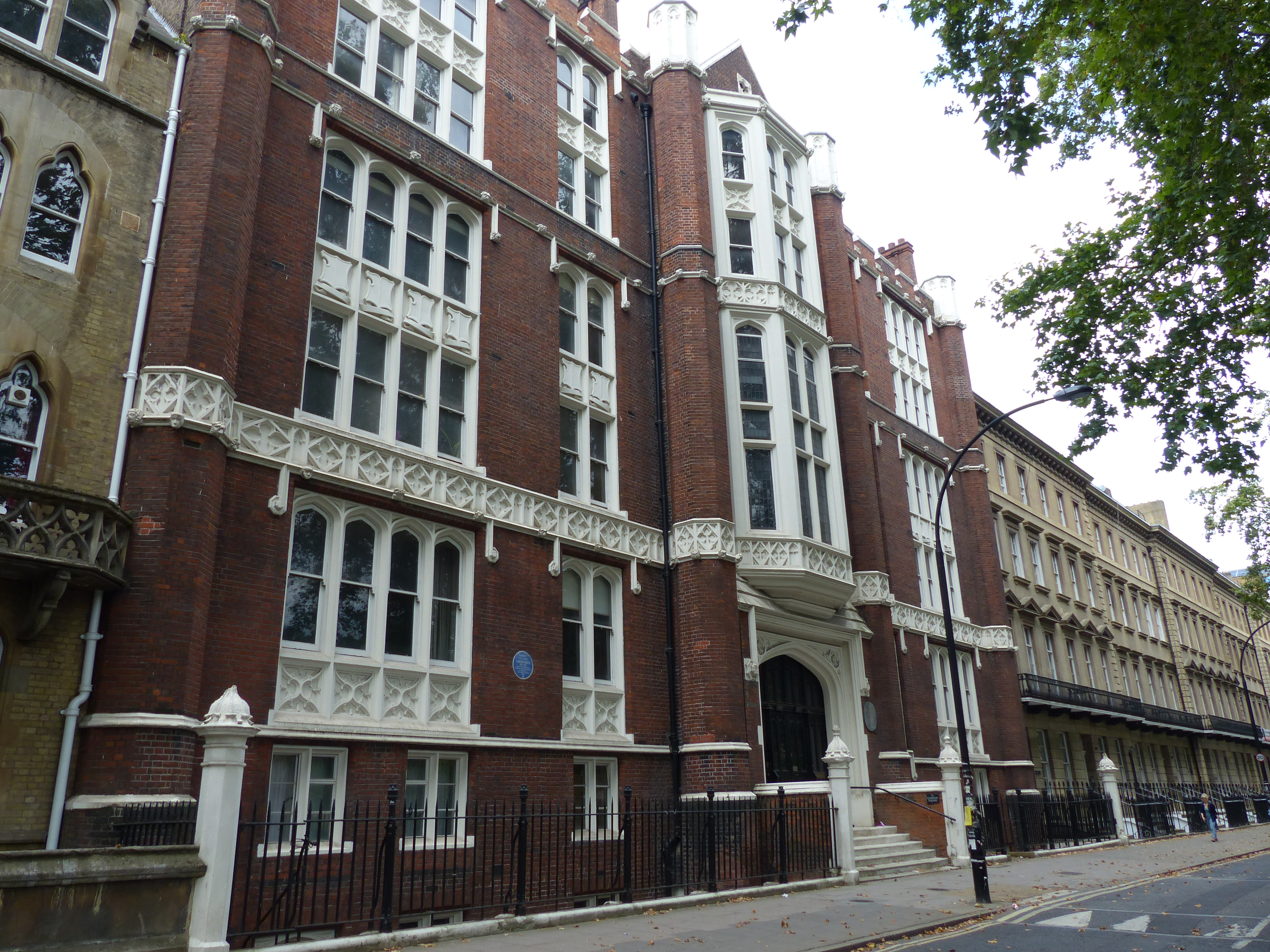
Dr Williams's Library in Gordon Square, London, in 2020

Dr Williams's Library was a small English research library, founded in 1729, with a focus on Nonconformist theology and history. From 1890 to 2025, the library occupied a building also known as University Hall, located in Gordon Square, Bloomsbury, London.

In 2025, the collection was relocated to the John Rylands Research Institute and Library at the University of Manchester, and the building became part of University College London.

== History ==
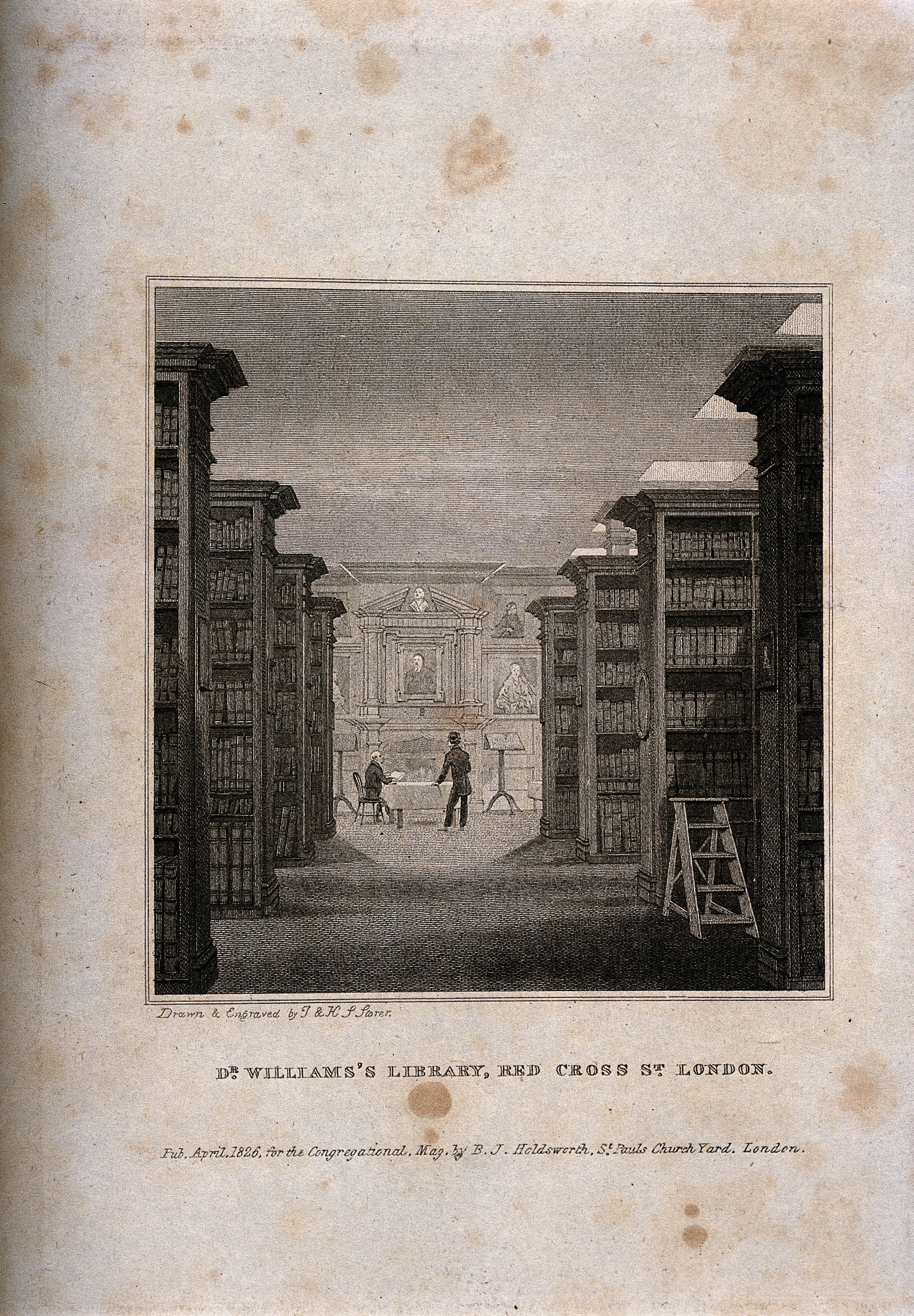
The interior of Dr Williams's Library, Red Cross Street, in 1826

Daniel Williams (c. 1643 – 1716) was a minister and theologian within the Presbyterian tradition. He left almost his whole estate of £50,000 to charity. He left his books (7,600 volumes) and money to establish a library.

The library was founded as a theological library, intended for the use of ministers of religion, students and others studying theology, religion and ecclesiastical history. In addition to its theological holdings, it contains collections of philosophy, history, literature, and other donated collections. The library is known to researchers of history and genealogy for its holdings of pre-19th-century material relating to Protestant nonconformity in England. The library opened in 1729 at Red Cross Street with its original benefaction of around 7,600 books from Williams. The library remained at this site until 1865, when the building was bought and demolished by the Metropolitan Railway Company. The library occupied premises at 8 Queen Square from 1865 to 1873, and then at 16 Grafton Street from 1873 to 1890.

In 1890, the library moved to University Hall in Gordon Square. This building, designed by Thomas Leverton Donaldson, Professor of Architecture at University College London, had originally been constructed in 1848–1849, and had served as the location of Manchester New College from 1853 to 1889. The building, which is now Grade II listed, is built in the Tudor style, in red brick with stone dressings.

The library always had close ties with the Unitarians and several of its first directors were ministers associated with Newington Green Unitarian Church. After a V-1 flying bomb destroyed Essex Hall, the headquarters of the General Assembly of Unitarian and Free Christian Churches, the Library offered a few spare rooms to displaced workers. They stayed for 14 years, until 1958.

On 13 July 2006 the library offered for sale at Sotheby's its copy of Shakespeare's First Folio. The book sold for a hammer price of £2.8 million. The library's director, David Wykes, commented:

The library has been proud to own this remarkable copy of Shakespeare's First Folio, but its sale will secure the finances of the library and safeguard our important historic collections of manuscripts and printed books for future generations.

Dr Williams’s Library closed in 2025 and transferred its contents to the John Rylands Research Institute and Library at the University of Manchester. The building in Gordon Square was acquired by University College London.

== Holdings ==
In addition to its theological holdings, the collection contains books on philosophy, history, literature, and related subjects. There is also a large collection of works on Byzantine history and culture bequeathed by Norman H. Baynes (1877–1961). In 1976, the library acquired the library of New College London, which until then had trained Congregationalist ministers.

The collection is known for its holdings of pre-19th century material relating to Protestant nonconformity in England, including papers by Dissenting minister Joshua Toulmin. This material also includes the manuscript of a 17th-century diary written by Roger Morrice (1628–1702), an English Puritan minister and political journalist; it covers the years 1677 to 1691, and in 2007 the Boydell Press published a six volume edition of Roger Morrice's Entring Book. The collection also includes many manuscripts of Philip Doddridge (1702–1751), a Nonconformist leader, educator, and hymnwriter, including letters between Doddridge and his wife, his wife's diary and some of his artifacts. Among the other Nonconformist texts in its collection are a variety of editions of Unitarian revisions of the Book of Common Prayer.

Amongst its aims was that, for a small fee, it kept a central registry of births mainly (but not solely) within non-conformist families, to avoid the necessity of having to have a child baptised in the Anglican church. It had variable success; up to 49,000 births were registered there until after a few months of the General Register Office for England and Wales starting up in 1837, following the Births and Deaths Registration Act the previous year. These registers are now at The National Archives under class RG5 and indexed in RG4.

== See also ==
- Gladstone's Library in Hawarden, formerly known as St Deiniol's Library
- The Evangelical Library, London
- Dr Williams' School in Dolgellau, named after the same benefactor (closed 1975, now Coleg Meirion-Dwyfor)
