= John Boucher (1777–1818) =

- Born: John Boucher; 1777
- Died: 12 November 1818
- Occupation: Anglican divine

John Boucher (1777–1818) was an English divine.

== Early life and education ==
Boucher was born in 1777. He was entered at St. John's college, proceeded B.A. on 23 May 1799. He was elected fellow of Magdalen at the same time, and was admitted to holy orders in 1801, and proceeded M.A. on 29 April 1802. Boucher was married and had several children.

== Career ==
At that time he became rector of Shaftesbury, and in 1804 vicar of Kirk Newton, near Wooler, Northumberland. He preached not only in his own parish, but in the neighboring district. One of his sermons was delivered at Berwick-on-Tweed in 1810, and another at Belford in 1816.

== Death ==
Boucher died on 12 November 1818, at Kirk Newton. There is a tablet to his memory on the north wall of the church where he was buried. After his death a 12mo volume of his 'Sermons' was printed, dedicated to Shute Barrington, bishop of Durham. The volume reached a second edition in 1821.

== Bibliography ==
- "Boucher, John (1777-1818)" . Dictionary of National Biography. London: Smith, Elder & Co. 1885–1900.
