= North Laine =

Shopping and residential district in Brighton, England

Coordinates: 50°49′35″N 0°08′21″W

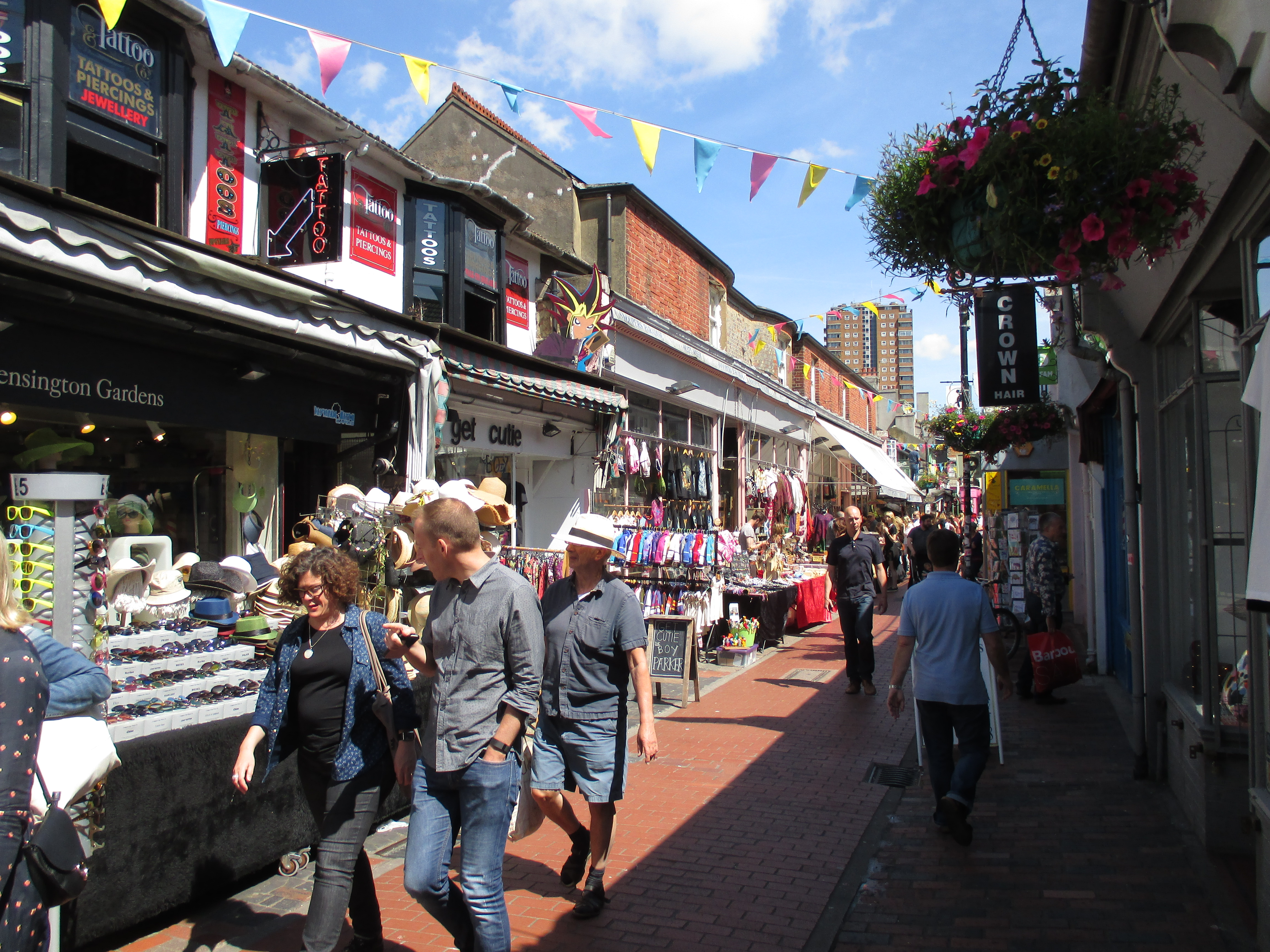
Kensington Gardens

North Laine is a central residential and shopping district of Brighton, East Sussex, on the English south coast, north of The Lanes. It is considered Brighton's bohemian and cultural quarter, with many pubs, cafés, restaurants, independent shops, plus theatres, a museum and art gallery. It was saved from plans to partly demolish it to accommodate a flyover in the 1970s. It is now a conservation area with many period terraced buildings dating from the late Georgian to early Victorian era.

== History ==
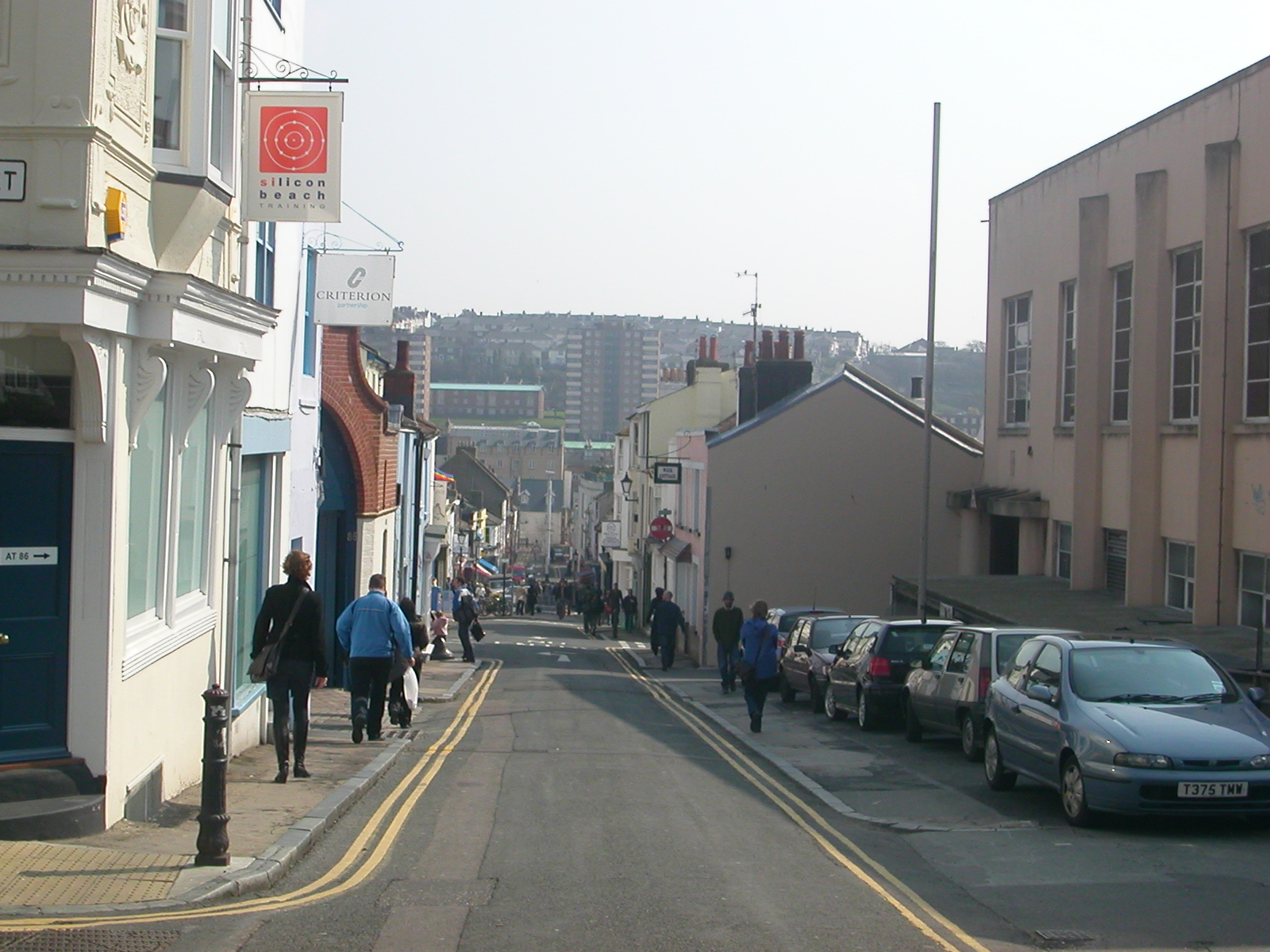
Looking east down Gloucester Road

"Laine" is a Sussex dialect term for an open tract of land at the base of the Downs, which itself is derived from an Anglo-Saxon legal term for a kind of land holding.

The space surrounding Brighton was once occupied by five of these "laines", open farming plots of a type that seem to have been generally unchanged in style since the Middle Ages, one of which was North Laine. By the 19th century, the farming plots (which had been for centuries subdivided into hides and furlongs) were encircled by major municipal roads for Brighton. With building developments across Brighton beginning to encroach upon the fields, the tracks that had divided the individual hide plots were normalized into streets, and the area was soon appropriated as a new settlement and market area. John Furner planted a market garden in the plots, and by 1840 a rail hub had been set up on the northern border of North Laine, Brighton railway station.

People living or working in the area would not have called it 'North Laine' back then; this did not happen officially until the late 1970s with the creation of the North Laine conservation area, when the historic name for the area was reclaimed by borough planning officer Ken Fines. It was, until then, just an area of north central Brighton.

During the reigns of George IV and William IV and through the first quarter of the reign of Queen Victoria, despite the grandeur of their Royal Pavilion, what would become the North Laine section was known partly for its squalor, poor living conditions and high concentration of slaughterhouses, notably in an area then known as Pimlico. However the area also contained streets of attractive terraced housing which had been growing from the 1820s to the 1840s. They often housed railway workers. Many houses were in multiple occupation. These are sought after properties to live nowadays.

=== 1970s: Saved from demolition ===
Ken Fines (1923–2008) was Borough Planning Officer for Brighton from 1974 to 1983. He is credited with having saved the North Laine area from extensive redevelopment that could have seen existing buildings being replaced by new high-rise buildings, a flyover and a large car park. Fines felt the area had charm, and pressured the local council to retain it. After considerable opposition by council members and businesses, the council eventually came round to his view, and the North Laine Conservation Area was designated in 1977, named after his observation of the historic name. In North Road, in the centre of the North Laine area, on Infinity Foods Workers Co-operative shop, is a plaque commemorating Fines.

== Today ==
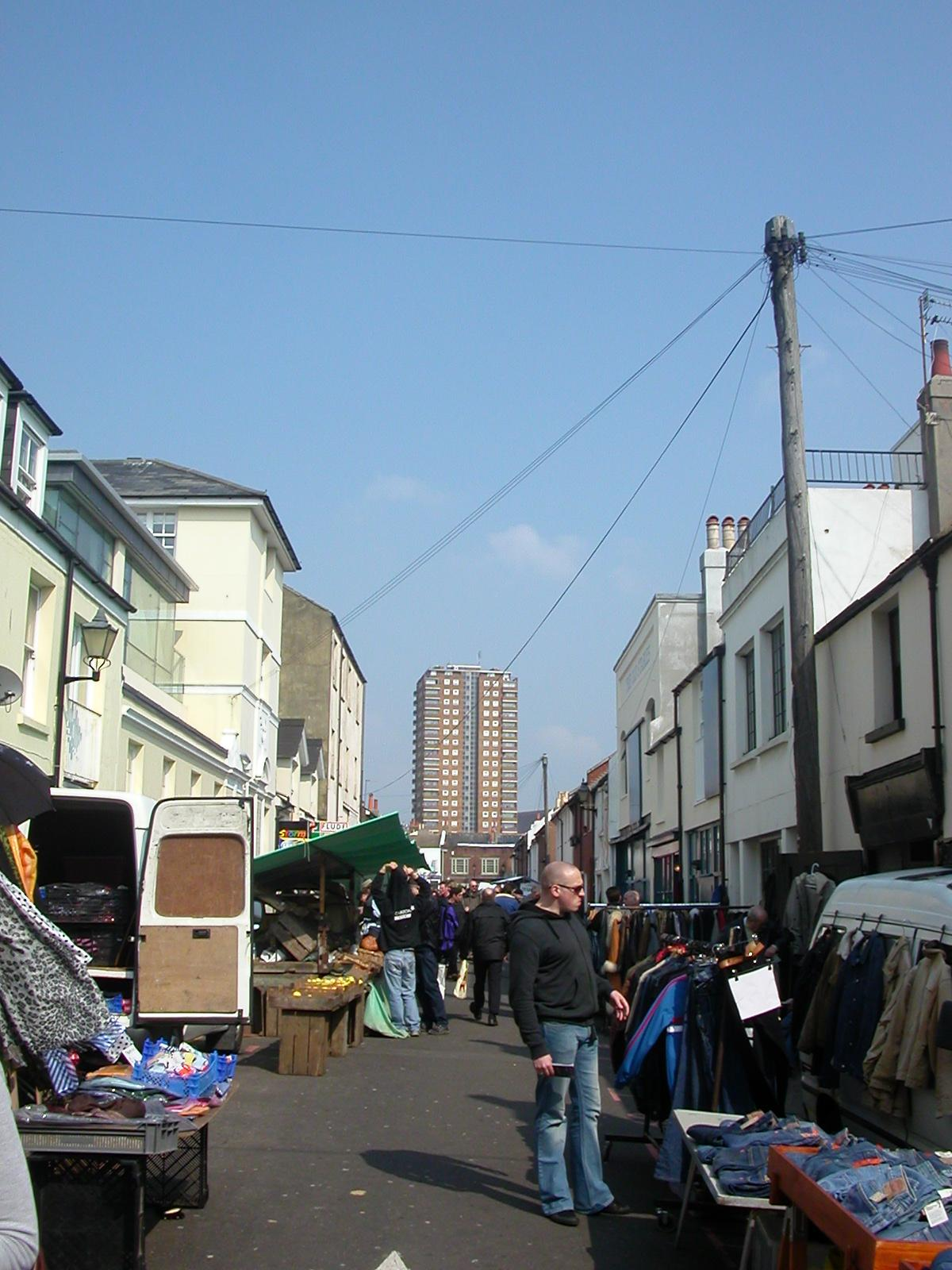
The Saturday market on Upper Gardner Street

Today North Laine is a thriving residential, conservation and retail area of central Brighton featuring largely period (from late Regency to early Victorian) terraced housing such as Kensington Place and Tidy Street plus bohemian independent shopping areas. Some streets combine retail and residential. North Laine is a tourist attraction as well as a popular area to live in central Brighton. Residents of the area are represented by the North Laine Community Association, a volunteer-led registered charity, formed by local residents of the area in 1976. North Laine stretches southwards from Brighton railway station down Trafalgar Street to the town centre, ending at the junction with North Street. The main shopping areas include Trafalgar St, Kensington Gardens, Sydney Street, Gardner Street and Bond Street - many pedestrianised or partly pedestrianised apart from Trafalgar St - which are popular both with locals and visitors. The area is well served with independent cafés, coffee shops, restaurants, bars, pubs and a few entertainment venues, notably comedy venue Komedia in Gardner Street which is in a former Tesco supermarket. The latter had been closed for some years in anticipation of major redevelopment of the area which failed to materialise; in the building was for some time a covered market with a number of small stallholders, until Komedia moved in from their previous home in Kemp Town. Komedia also has a separately run cinema. The first branch of Anita Roddick's Body Shop, later to become a multinational business, was opened at 22 Kensington Gardens. Typical retailers include art, antiques, architectural salvage, ladies and men's fashion, tailors, jewellery, gifts, second-hand books, hats, indoor flea markets, fine wines and spirits, music, records, children's shops, vintage and retro clothing, graphic novels, musical instruments and new age paraphernalia. There is a high turnover of boutique-style shops and cafes in North Laine in general.

Upper Gardner Street is closed to traffic every Saturday for an on-street market selling everything from second-hand clothing to art, pottery, bric a brac and hand made goods also some food stalls.

The City Council redeveloped a gap site, constructing a new library and public square, Jubilee Square, which became available to the public in 2005. This significantly changed the flow of pedestrians, which prior to this had been predominantly straight through North Laine on the main shopping streets, and is now more two-dimensional.

== Bibliography ==
- Wales, Tony (2000). Sussex as She Wus Spoke, a Guide to the Sussex Dialect. Seaford: SB Publications. ISBN 1-85770-209-3.
