= Henry Acton =

English Unitarian minister

Henry Acton (10 March 1797 – 16 August 1843) was an English Unitarian minister, and author of numerous sermons, pamphlets, lectures, and statements.

== Biography ==
Acton was born at Lewes, Sussex, 10 March 1797, where his father was parish clerk at St John sub Castro Church. He was apprenticed in his sixteenth year to Mr. J. Baxter, a Lewes printer, and became a member of a literary society in the town, where his papers were much admired. The two Unitarian congregations of Southover and Ditchling agreed to give him £50 a year jointly (a grant of £10 being added from the Unitarian Fund) for serving their chapels on alternate Sundays with a fellow-apprentice, William Browne; and his indentures with Mr. Baxter, the printer, being set aside by arrangement, he placed himself as a student, in 1818, under Dr. Morell, the Brighton minister, then head of his flourishing academy at Hove. Acton studied Greek, Latin, and mathematics at Hove, and walked to one or other of his small congregations on Sundays, returning, on foot, the same day. He became minister at Walthamstow in February 1821, and in 1823 co-pastor with the Rev. James Manning at the more important unitarian church known as George's Meeting, Exeter. There he married, became second master of a proprietary classical school at Mount Radford in the neighbourhood, and made himself prominent as an untiring worker till his death, from apoplexy, on 16 August 1843, in his forty-sixth year.

He published many sermons, pamphlets, lectures, and statements, of which a full list is given in James's ‘Memoir’ (p. xcvii). They were delivered by him at various intervals from 1823, some in controversy with Henry Phillpotts, Bishop of Exeter. Acton also established and edited The Gospel Advocate of which four volumes appeared. He was an effective preacher, and had overcome the disadvantages of his defective education. He left a widow and six children.

== Works ==
Religious Opinions and Example of Milton, Locke, and Newton (1833)
