= List of places of worship in Lewes District =

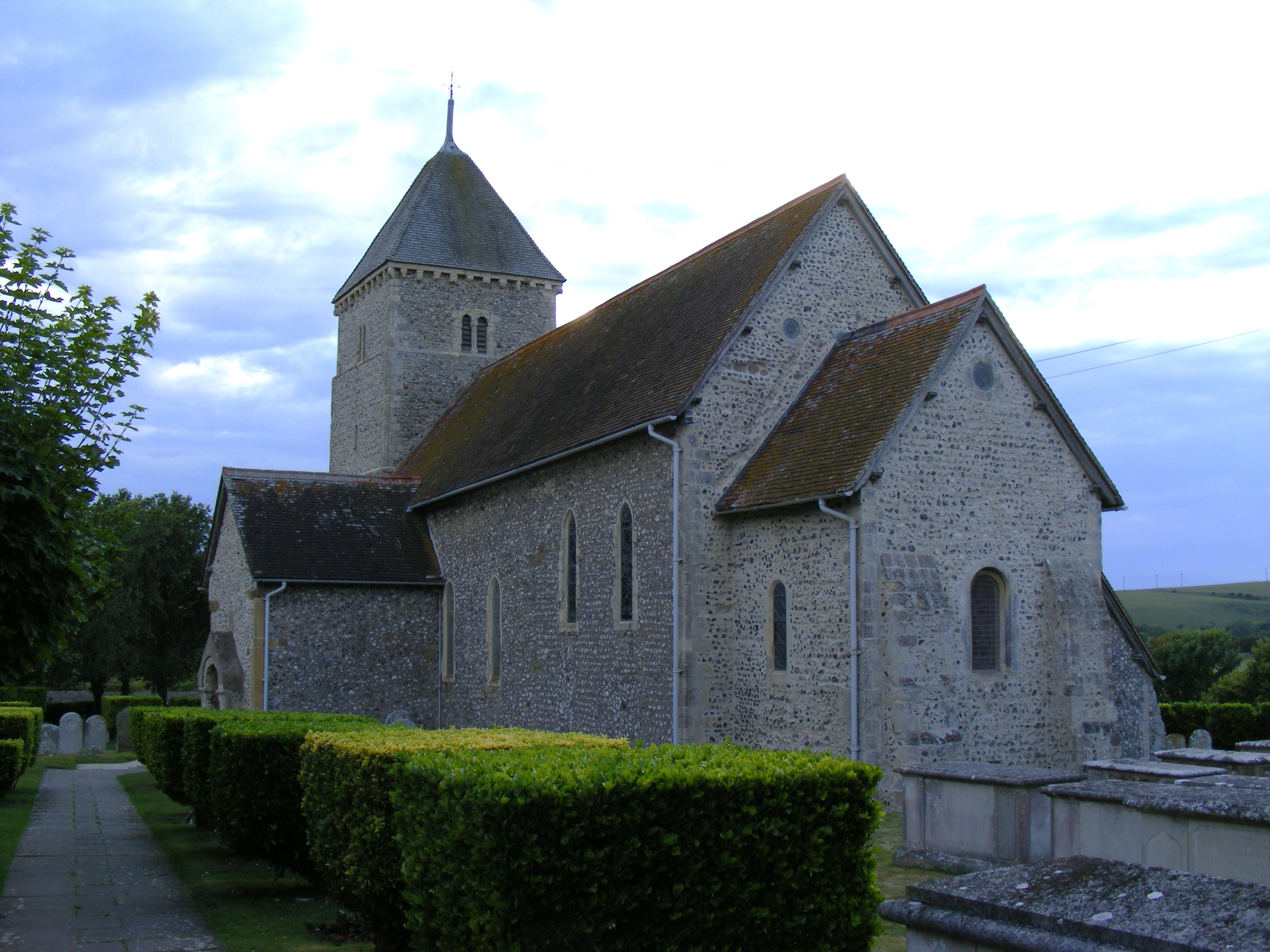
St Andrew's Church, the parish church of Bishopstone, is one of many Grade I-listed Anglican churches in the district of Lewes. The linear chancel–nave–tower form is found frequently in Sussex.

There are 70 extant churches and places of worship in the district of Lewes, one of five local government districts in the English county of East Sussex. A further 21 former places of worship are no longer in religious use. The area now covered by the district is mainly rural and characterised by small villages with ancient parish churches. The riverside market town of Lewes, the port of Newhaven and the seaside towns of Seaford, Peacehaven and Telscombe Cliffs are the main urban areas and have higher concentrations of religious buildings.

Most residents of the district identify themselves as Christian, and there were no places of worship serving any other religious groups until a mosque and Islamic community centre opened in Seaford in 2017. Many Christian denominations are represented—the town of Lewes in particular has a long-established history of Protestant Nonconformism—but the majority of churches serve the Church of England community.

Historic England or its predecessor English Heritage have awarded listed status to 43 of Lewes district's current and former places of worship. A building is defined as "listed" when it is placed on a statutory register of buildings of "special architectural or historic interest" in accordance with the Planning (Listed Buildings and Conservation Areas) Act 1990. The Department for Digital, Culture, Media and Sport, a Government department, is responsible for this; Historic England, a non-departmental public body, acts as an agency of the department to administer the process and advise the department on relevant issues. There are three grades of listing status. Grade I, the highest, is defined as being of "exceptional interest"; Grade II* is used for "particularly important buildings of more than special interest"; and Grade II, the lowest, is used for buildings of "special interest".

== Overview of Lewes and its places of worship ==
Lewes district located within East Sussex

Lewes district covers 113 sq mi (290 km^{2}) of the western part of East Sussex. The English Channel forms its southern boundary for 9 miles (14.5 km); four of the five largest towns in the district—Peacehaven, Telscombe Cliffs, Newhaven and Seaford—are on the coast. Lewes, the administrative centre of the district and the county town of East Sussex, lies inland in the centre of the district. The rest of the district is mostly rural. The city and unitary authority of Brighton and Hove lies to the southwest; the district of Mid Sussex, in the neighbouring county of West Sussex, is to the west; and Lewes's eastern boundary is with Wealden district.

The town of Lewes enjoys a strategic position on the River Ouse and surrounded by hills. There is evidence of Anglo-Saxon habitation, and by the 10th century it had become the most important borough in Sussex. It was the administrative centre of the Rape of Lewes, one of the pre-Norman subdivisions of Sussex. The rape was given by William the Conqueror to William de Warenne, 1st Earl of Surrey, who had become a major landowner by the time of the Domesday survey in 1086. The town has many surviving Anglican parish churches, of which St Anne's is the oldest. Others such as St Andrew's, St Martin's and St Mary-in-the-Market-Place declined and fell out of use by the Middle Ages, and their parishes were combined with others. Nonconformism has been established in the town for more than three centuries: Unitarians, Methodists, Quakers, Baptists, Strict Baptists, Presbyterians and Congregationalists all founded chapels in the 18th or 19th century, many of which are still in operation. Ditchling and Wivelsfield also have long associations with Nonconformist worship. Outside the town of Lewes itself, most manors and villages had developed by the 12th century, and many of their associated churches date from that time—although the Victorian enthusiasm for church restoration had an effect throughout the district.

There was a church at Bishopstone in the 8th century, and "current scholarship advocates a date of c. 975" for the founding of the present St Andrew's Church, which retains much Saxon and Norman fabric. The nave of Southease church is 11th-century, and St John the Baptist's Church at Southover was built in the same century, albeit as a hospitium associated with the adjacent Lewes Priory. Some 11th-century fabric also survives at Wivelsfield, and the nave at Ditchling is of that period. Many Anglican churches in the district were built in the 12th century, as Norman architecture gave way to Early English Gothic. Iford, Piddinghoe, Rodmell and Telscombe are wholly or mostly of that date; Barcombe, Beddingham, St Thomas-at-Cliffe Church at Cliffe, East Chiltington, Hamsey, Newhaven, Newick, Plumpton, Ringmer St Leonard's Church at Seaford and Westmeston retain some parts from that century (most commonly the nave). The churches at Chailey, East Blatchington, St Michael's at Lewes, South Malling, Streat, Tarring Neville and West Firle have 13th-century origins, while St Pancras Church at Kingston-near-Lewes was built a century later. Glynde's parish church was rebuilt in a distinctive Palladian style in the 1760s, while the ruinous medieval church in Falmer was rebuilt in the early 19th century. New churches of the 19th century include St John sub Castro, Lewes (1839, replacing an 11th-century predecessor), Offham (1859), North Chailey (1876; closed), Spithurst (1880; closed) and Plumpton Green (1893). Increased residential development in the 20th century prompted the construction of more churches: at Peacehaven (1922; replaced by the present building in 1955), on the Nevill Estate in Lewes (1938), and in the Sutton area of Seaford (1959). A second church was also built in East Blatchington in the 1920s but has closed.

Roman Catholics in the Lewes area had to travel to Brighton to worship until the Lewes Mission was founded in 1865. A chapel in a house was used at first, but on 25 January 1870 a permanent church dedicated to The Sacred Heart and St Pancras was built. It was a stone-built Early English Gothic Revival building designed by Carlos Crisford, who also designed Central Methodist Church, Eastbourne. It was replaced by the present St Pancras Church in 1939. A convent chapel was built in Newhaven in around 1878, but it was not until 20 years later that a permanent Catholic church was built there. W. H. Romaine-Walker was the architect. It was dedicated to The Sacred Heart and was opened on 2 January 1898 by the Bishop of Southwark Francis Bourne. The following year he built a house in nearby Seaford; it included a chapel dedicated to St Francis de Sales, which was open to the public from the beginning. Priests from Newhaven served it at first. This oratory was succeeded by a permanent church, the Church of St Thomas More, in 1935. The present Church of the Immaculate Conception in Peacehaven was registered in 1963, replacing an earlier church.

The Methodist Statistical Returns published in 1947 (Note: The statistical return was compiled between 1940 and 1947 with the aim of documenting all Methodist chapels extant at that time: their location, previous affiliation prior to the Methodist Union of 1932, capacity, building materials and similar details.) recorded the existence of Methodist churches, all of Wesleyan origin and administered by the Sussex Mission, at Station Street in Lewes, Chapel Street in Newhaven and Seaford. The building in Lewes closed in 1973 and is now in commercial use; the congregation moved to Christ Church. Newhaven's chapel closed around the time the Returns were compiled, but a Methodist congregation subsequently began to share the Anglican parish church of St Michael and All Angels. Seaford's Methodist chapel was still used until 2016, when it was sold and the congregation moved into the town's United Reformed chapel following years of collaboration between the two denominations. It is now owned by Kings Church Seaford, an Evangelical congregation.

General Baptists, Unitarians and Calvinistic and Strict Baptists have a long and interconnected history in the district. A General Baptist congregation existed in Ditchling in the late 17th century, and a chapel was built c. 1730. A General Baptist chapel built in the Southover area of Lewes from 1741 was associated with it. The chapel at Ditchling became Unitarian later in the 18th century, and some members seceded and founded a new Strict Baptist chapel at Wivelsfield. Bethel Chapel opened there in 1763 and is still in use. Westgate Chapel in Lewes, built c. 1700 for Presbyterians, also adopted Unitarian views in the 18th century, and members of Southover General Baptist Chapel joined in the early 19th century when their views changed in the same way. The old chapel was converted into a house in the 1970s; Westgate Chapel remains in use as a Unitarian place of worship. Elsewhere in Lewes town centre, a General Baptist congregation became established in the town centre in 1818 and built the present much-altered Eastgate Baptist Church in 1843. Nearby, Jireh Chapel opened in 1805 for Independent Calvinistic Baptists and was extended in 1826. The cause declined in the 20th century, and the Free Presbyterian Church of Ulster began using it for worship since 1998. The present Jubilee Christian Centre in Barcombe, a modern building, is the successor to a Strict Baptist chapel founded in 1810. Other Calvinistic or Strict Baptist churches no longer in religious use can be found in Newick (1834), Ditchling (1867), Lewes (two buildings: c. 1860 and 1906) and Newhaven (1904). In the 20th century, Baptist churches were built in both Newhaven and Seaford in 1901. The original building at Newhaven still stands and is used as the church hall of the present church, opened in 1938. The chapel in Seaford town centre was demolished in 1973 for commercial development and was replaced by a new circular church building in the East Blatchington area of the town. The Countess of Huntingdon's Connexion, another Calvinist group with links to Methodism, is also represented in the district. The founder of the group, Selina Hastings, Countess of Huntingdon, lived in Wivelsfield and opened a chapel there in 1778—only the second to be founded, and the oldest survivor (the first, opened in Brighton in 1761, has been demolished). Ote Hall Chapel remains in regular use. Another Connexion chapel founded around the same time in the Cliffe area of Lewes was demolished in the late 19th century.

The United Reformed Church was formed in 1972 by a merger between the Congregational Church and the Presbyterian Church of England. Seaford Congregational Chapel opened in 1877 and is now the Cross Way Clinton Centre, a shared Methodist and United Reformed church; similarly, the joint Methodist and United Reformed Christ Church in Lewes opened in 1954 as Lewes Congregational Church. There is also a United Reformed Church at Telscombe Cliffs. Former Congregational chapels survive in Newhaven (1866–1938), South Heighton (1891–the mid-20th century) and Ringmer (1914–1995). There was also a Presbyterian chapel in Lewes: built in around 1870, it closed in the 1940s and is now in commercial use.

King's Church, an Charismatic Evangelical fellowship associated with the Newfrontiers movement, has congregations in Lewes and Seaford. Former mission halls in Ditchling, Newick and South Chailey remain in use by Evangelical congregations: Emmanuel Chapel in Ditchling is a replacement building registered in 1972, and Chailey Free Church's present building dates from 1992, but Newick Evangelical Free Church still occupies the original building of 1892. Other Evangelical churches have been registered in Peacehaven in 1966, replacing an earlier building, and the Sutton area of Seaford in 1969.

Quakers have met in Lewes since 1675, but their present meeting house dates from 1784 and has been altered and extended several times. In 1967 a permanent meeting house was established in Ditchling for Quakers in the area; it was a converted building which had had several secular uses. Jehovah's Witnesses have three Kingdom Halls in the district. The hall at Station Street in Lewes was registered in 1987, replacing a building on Lancaster Street used since 1960 which had in turn succeeded an earlier hall registered in 1949 on Albion Street. The Kingdom Halls in Peacehaven and Seaford date from 1964 and 1983 respectively. A Pentecostal congregation affiliated with the Elim denomination founded a chapel in Newhaven in 1964. The Haywards Heath Chapel of the Church of Jesus Christ of Latter-day Saints opened in Wivelsfield in 1999.

== Religious affiliation ==
According to the 2011 United Kingdom Census, 97,502 people lived in Lewes District. Of these, 57% identified themselves as Christian, 0.57% were Muslim, 0.5% were Buddhist, 0.33% were Jewish, 0.26% were Hindu, 0.04% were Sikh, 0.62% followed another religion, 32.45% claimed no religious affiliation and 8.23% did not state their religion. The proportion of Christians was lower than of England as a whole (59.38%). Affiliation with Buddhism and faiths in the "any other religion" category was more widespread in the district: the corresponding figures for England were 0.45% and 0.43% respectively. The proportion of people with no religious affiliation was also higher than the national figure of 24.74%. The other religions had much lower proportions of followers than in England overall: the corresponding national percentages were 5.02% for Islam, 1.52% for Hinduism, 0.79% for Sikhism and 0.49% for Judaism.

== Administration ==
All Anglican churches in Lewes district are part of the Diocese of Chichester, whose cathedral is at Chichester in West Sussex. Three archdeaconries—Chichester, Horsham, and Lewes and Hastings—make up the next highest level of administration; the district has at least one church in each. St Laurence's Church in Falmer, which is part of a united parish with Stanmer Church across the border in the city of Brighton and Hove, is part of the Rural Deanery of Brighton, one of five deaneries in the Archdeaconry of Chichester. St Peter and St John the Baptist's Church at Wivelsfield is in the Rural Deanery of Cuckfield, and the churches at Ditchling, Streat and Westmeston are part of the Rural Deanery of Hurst; these are two of the eight deaneries in the Archdeaconry of Horsham. The Archdeaconry of Hastings, which also has eight deaneries, is responsible for all other Anglican churches in the district. Except for the churches in Chailey and Newick, which are in the Rural Deanery of Uckfield, all are controlled by the Rural Deanery of Lewes and Seaford.

The Roman Catholic Diocese of Arundel and Brighton, whose cathedral is at Arundel, administers the four Roman Catholic churches in Lewes district. The diocese has 11 deaneries, each with several churches. Lewes Deanery is responsible for St Pancras' Church at Lewes, the Church of the Sacred Heart in Newhaven, the Church of the Immaculate Conception in Peacehaven and St Thomas More Church in Seaford as well as three other churches the Mid Sussex district of West Sussex.

Eastgate Baptist Church in Lewes and the Baptist churches in Newhaven and Seaford are administratively part of the East Sussex Network of the South Eastern Baptist Association. Baptist congregations affiliated to this network also meet in Peacehaven and Ringmer, but do not have their own church buildings: Coastlands Church in Peacehaven is based at Peacehaven Community School, and Ringmer Baptist Church uses Ringmer village hall.

The Central Sussex United Area, an ecumenical partnership between the Methodist Church and the United Reformed Church's Southern Synod, was formed in September 2007 to administer churches belonging to those denominations in an area bounded by Haywards Heath, Eastbourne and Crowborough. Within Lewes District, Christ Church in Lewes, Chyngton Methodist Church, Cross Way Church in Seaford and St Michael's Church in Newhaven are part of this area. Telscombe Cliffs United Reformed Church is part of the Surrey and Sussex Synod Area.

== Current places of worship ==
Current places of worship
Name	Image	Location	Denomination/ Affiliation	Grade	Notes	Refs
St Mary the Virgin Church (More images)		Barcombe; 50.9108°N 0.0165°E	Anglican	II*	The church serves a large rural parish whose original settlement declined in the 14th century. Part of the nave is 12th-century; the tower and widened chancel were built a century later. Restoration work in 1879–1880 included replacement of all the ancient lancet windows. Charles Eamer Kempe provided some stained glass.	
Jubilee Christian Centre (More images)		Barcombe; 50.9162°N 0.0141°E	Baptist	–	Barcombe's first chapel, associated with the Strict Baptist and Calvinist movements, was established in 1810 just off the road to Hamsey. It was a brick structure in the Vernacular style. A modern brick building, registered in 1980, now stands on the site. The FIEC-aligned church changed its name from Barcombe Baptist Church in 2006.	
St Andrew's Church (More images)		Beddingham; 50.8526°N 0.0515°E	Anglican	I	The isolated riverside settlement was founded in the 9th century but has declined to a negligible size. The church has Norman origins and was added to over a long period: most of the structural work is 14th- and 16th-century. The flint building has a chancel, nave and tower.	
St Andrew's Church (More images)		Bishopstone; 50.7897°N 0.0877°E	Anglican	I	Norman settlers rebuilt this village's early-8th-century Anglo-Saxon church, but parts remain in the nave, porch and tower. The 12th-century reconstruction produced an Early English-style flint and stone church.	
St Peter's Church (More images)		Chailey; 50.9567°N 0.0192°W	Anglican	II*	This sandstone and ashlar church retains its 13th-century chancel and tower with its shingled spire. The nave was enlarged (and aisles added) in 1878–1879 by John Oldrid Scott.	
St Thomas à Becket Church (More images)		Cliffe, Lewes; 50.8745°N 0.0188°E	Anglican	II*	Also known as St Thomas-at-Cliffe Church, this sturdy flint structure has work from several periods from the 12th century to the late 19th century, when it was restored twice in quick succession. A square tower rises in three stages at the west end.	
Jireh Chapel (More images)		Cliffe, Lewes; 50.8755°N 0.0187°E	Free Presbyterian Church of Ulster	I	This large chapel was built for a Strict Baptist congregation in 1805 and extended in 1826. The timber-framed building is faced with bricks and slate tiles, there is a Tuscan porch, and the roof is barrel-vaulted. In 1998 it was taken on by the Free Presbyterian Church of Ulster, becoming one of seven churches in England used by followers of Ian Paisley's Protestant denomination, but in 2024 a Strict Baptist congregation formerly meeting at Galeed Strict Baptist Chapel, Brighton began to use it.	
St Leonard's Church (More images)		Denton; 50.8045°N 0.0628°E	Anglican	II*	The church has some structural work from the Norman era, and the font is of the same age. The external appearance was altered in the 19th century, but there are some ancient windows. The nave and chancel run into each other with no dividing arch.	
St Margaret's Church (More images)		Ditchling; 50.9213°N 0.1157°W	Anglican	I	The appearance of this church, which stands on raised ground at the village crossroads, is 13th-century, and most of the work was done then. The nave is two centuries older, though, and there are later additions. The cruciform building is of flint and sandstone. The central tower has a squat spire.	
Emmanuel Chapel (More images)		Ditchling; 50.9199°N 0.1149°W	Evangelical	–	Ditchling's tradition of Nonconformism continues in the 21st century: a former mission hall on this site, opened in the early 20th century and which may have replaced another hall elsewhere, was itself replaced by this building which was registered for worship and for marriages in August 1972. It is one of three extant non-Anglican places of worship in the village.	
Friends Meeting House		Ditchling; 50.9225°N 0.1142°W	Quaker	–	This small meeting house in the centre of Ditchling serves the village and nearby settlements such as Hassocks, Burgess Hill and Haywards Heath (where additional meetings take place). It was registered for worship in September 1967 but has been used by Quakers since 1966, before which they used Ditchling Unitarian Chapel and various secular buildings. Ronald H. Carn was responsible for converting the 19th-century former agricultural building, whose subsequent uses included an abattoir and a clubhouse.	
Ditchling Unitarian Chapel (The Old Meeting House) (More images)		Ditchling; 50.9216°N 0.1131°W	Unitarian	II	Built in 1740 for General Baptists on a twitten off East End Lane, this Vernacular-style chapel is attached to a partly tile-hung house of 1672. The red-brick chapel, with tall windows, was renovated between 1877 and 1887; additions included a gabled porch.	
St Peter's Church (More images)		East Blatchington; 50.7790°N 0.1036°E	Anglican	II*	Parts of this long, thick-walled church date from the 13th century—in particular the tower, a piscina and a priest's door, with its rounded arch—but Norman origins have been claimed. The chancel has lancet windows.	
Seaford Baptist Church (More images)		East Blatchington; 50.7769°N 0.0955°E	Baptist	–	The present building, a low circular structure, was built in the 1970s to replace an Early English-style red-brick church in Seaford town centre, which existed from 1901 until 1973. The new church was registered for worship and for marriages in September 1972.	
East Chiltington Church (More images)		East Chiltington; 50.9194°N 0.0525°W	Anglican	II*	Although this sandstone church now has its own parish, it was a chapel of ease to Westmeston for centuries. The nave is the oldest part: it was built in the early 12th century, and buttresses were added later in the century. The tower is slightly later, and the chancel is 14th-century.	
St Laurence's Church (More images)		Falmer; 50.8624°N 0.0760°W	Anglican	II*	A restoration of 1840 was responsible for the unusual Neo-Norman appearance of this church, which was rebuilt between 1815 and 1817 from the demolished ruins of a medieval predecessor.	
St Mary the Virgin Church (More images)		Glynde; 50.8646°N 0.0683°E	Anglican	II*	Sir Thomas Robinson, an advocate of Palladian architecture, rebuilt Glynde's parish church in that style between 1763 and 1765. The boxlike, pedimented cobbled flint and ashlar building has a large cupola containing a bell. Pevsner disliked its stained glass, and the church has been criticised as "being in bad taste".	
St Peter's Church (More images)		Hamsey; 50.8912°N 0.0095°E	Anglican	I	This 12th-century church is situated on a slope by a loop in the River Ouse—a very remote spot. The east part of the nave and the west end of the chancel are original; their other parts are 14th-century, as is the tower. A porch was added a century later on the south wall.	
St Nicholas' Church (More images)		Iford; 50.8484°N 0.0007°W	Anglican	I	Victorian restoration has not disguised the 12th-century origins of this small village's church, which stands on the site of a Norman predecessor recorded in the Domesday survey of 1086. The flint structure is long and narrow; the oldest part is the nave, which is separated from the chancel by a substantial, short tower topped by a shingled spire. The windows (mostly lancets) and a piscina are also original. A former north aisle has now vanished.	
St Pancras' Church (More images)		Kingston near Lewes; 50.8563°N 0.0245°W	Anglican	II*	The tall and wide chancel and nave are balanced by a curiously slim tower with a tiled pyramidal roof. The church was built in the early 14th century in the Decorated Gothic style. Much of the original stone and flintwork was restored in 1874.	
St Anne's Church (More images)		Lewes; 50.8724°N 0.0016°E	Anglican	I	Originally called St Mary Westout in reference to the ancient suburb of Westout, the Early English-style flint exterior reflects a restoration of 1889, but Norman details predominate inside. The long nave has a porch in which a 12th-century door has been inserted. St Anne's is the parish church of Lewes.	
St Michael's Church (More images)		Lewes; 50.8723°N 0.0071°E	Anglican	I	This town-centre church is one of three in the Ouse Valley with a circular west tower, although its 13th-century date is later than the others. It has an octagonal spire and is pebbledashed; the rest of the building is of flint. An aisled nave and chancel run parallel with the High Street.	
St John sub Castro Church (More images)		Lewes; 50.8760°N 0.0094°E	Anglican	II	The dedication means St John under the Castle. An Anglo-Saxon church stood nearby; its chancel arch and a doorway were incorporated into George Cheeseman's new knapped flint Early English-style structure of 1839. The side windows are tall lancets with tracery.	
Eastgate Baptist Church (More images)		Lewes; 50.8751°N 0.0134°E	Baptist	–	The first Baptist place of worship in the area was a chapel of 1741 in Southover. A flint, yellow brick and stone Romanesque Revival chapel opened in 1843 on Eastgate Street, replacing an 1819 building on the same site. It has a tower and spire at one corner, and was extended in the 20th century. A marriage licence was granted for the old chapel in September 1837 and was carried over to the new church.	
Kingdom Hall (More images)		Lewes; 50.8720°N 0.0111°E	Jehovah's Witnesses	–	This is used by the Lewes Congregation of Jehovah's Witnesses and was registered in November 1987. Regular services are held in Sign language. Part of the building was originally a National school built in 1840.	
Christ Church (More images)		Lewes; 50.8760°N 0.0025°W	Methodist/United Reformed Church	–	This modern building houses United Reformed Church and Methodist congregations, and is now the only church in the town serving those denominations. It opened in 1954 and was registered for worship and for marriages in July 1955, originally with the name Lewes Congregational Church. It became Lewes United Reformed Church at the union of 1972; and on 20 June 1999 it was reconstituted as a LEP incorporating the town's Methodist congregation. Congregationalists and Methodists had previously worshipped at Tabernacle Congregational Church in Cliffe High Street and a chapel in Station Street respectively.	
Friends Meeting House (More images)		Lewes; 50.8726°N 0.0139°E	Quaker	II	The town's first meeting house was built in 1675 and altered in 1752; the present brick and mathematical tile structure replaced it in 1784, and an adjoining cottage was built in 1801. There is a brick-faced wooden porch with Doric pilasters topped with a pediment. The building's "long and complex history of extensions" reflects its growing importance in the life of the town: the most recent extension was in 1977–78	
St Pancras' Church (More images)		Lewes; 50.8724°N 0.0025°E	Roman Catholic	–	A stone church built in 1870 and dedicated to the Sacred Heart was replaced in 1938–39 by a larger red-brick and flint building by Edward Walters. It is a simple Gothic-style structure with no tower. The new church was registered for marriages in April 1939.	
Westgate Chapel (More images)		Lewes; 50.8718°N 0.0067°E	Unitarian	II*	Parts of a late-16th-century inn were used in this chapel, built in about 1700. The timber-framed building has a plain exterior with some knapped flintwork. The entrance is in a brick porch. Extensions have included a 19th-century library. The early congregations were Presbyterian, but Unitarian views were practised by the time members of the former Southover General Baptist Chapel joined in the early 19th century. The chapel was registered for marriages in October 1837.	
St Mary's Church (More images)		Nevill Estate, Lewes; 50.8802°N 0.0082°W	Anglican	–	This church on the edge of Lewes, opened in 1938, is a chapel of ease within St Anne's parish. It is used as a church hall and for community activities, and occasional services are held.	
St Michael and All Angels Church (More images)		Newhaven; 50.7918°N 0.0454°E	Anglican/ Methodist	II*	Newhaven's parish church stands on high ground overlooking the town. Its east tower and attached apse (a rare combination) are Norman; William Habershon restored the rest of the church in 1854. The nave has wide aisles and was built in 1791 to replace its Norman predecessor. The town' Methodist worshippers joined in the 1970s, and the church was registered for Methodist worship and marriages in May 1971.	
Newhaven Baptist Church (More images)		Newhaven; 50.7935°N 0.0463°E	Baptist	–	The chapel was built in 1901 to the design of George Baines. It became the church hall when the present church was built at right angles to it in 1938. Its architect, F.J. Raynor, worshipped at the church. The simple red-brick structure, which stands above the Brighton Road, "achieve[s] a little show" with the arched windows, which give an Art Deco feel. The chapel was registered for marriages in February 1903.	
Elim Church Newhaven (More images)		Newhaven; 50.7929°N 0.0476°E	Pentecostal	–	A Pentecostal congregation worships at this red-brick building on Meeching Rise in the town centre. It was registered for worship in October 1964 and for marriages in April 1966. It is now described as the "Newhaven Hub", one of two locations of the Brighton Elim Church whose main place of worship is the Fountain Centre in Patcham.	
St Mary's Church (More images)		Newick; 50.9693°N 0.0232°E	Anglican	II*	Fragments of the original nave, built in about 1100, remain; it was added to in the 14th century when the church was extended and the chancel was added. The latter was taken down and moved during John Oldrid Scott's rebuilding of 1886–1887. The Perpendicular Gothic tower is 15th-century.	
Newick Evangelical Free Church (More images)		Newick; 50.9723°N 0.0071°E	Evangelical	–	This small building, dating from 1892, was originally a mission hall. It is now used by an Evangelical community as their place of worship and meeting place, and was registered for marriages for their use in November 1969.	
St Peter's Church (More images)		Offham; 50.8920°N 0.0099°W	Anglican	II	Ewan Christian designed this church in the Decorated Gothic style in 1859. The flint and sandstone structure has an apsidal chancel with a tower and spire. Jean-Baptiste Capronnier provided stained glass windows in 1862 and 1876.	
Church of the Ascension (More images)		Peacehaven; 50.7931°N 0.0032°E	Anglican	–	L. Keir Hett's red-brick church, with a squat tower above its entrance, a side chapel and a gallery, replaced the community's first church—a prefabricated building of 1922.	
Peacehaven Evangelical Free Church (More images)		Peacehaven; 50.7902°N 0.0081°E	Evangelical	–	This modern brick building, serving an Evangelical congregation, is on the main South Coast Road. It was registered for worship and for marriages in September 1966.	
Kingdom Hall (More images)		Peacehaven; 50.7889°N 0.0108°E	Jehovah's Witnesses	–	This modern Kingdom Hall is used by the Newhaven Congregation of Jehovah's Witnesses, and is also situated on the South Coast Road. It was registered for worship in August 1964 and for marriages the following month.	
Church of the Immaculate Conception (More images)		Peacehaven; 50.7929°N 0.0006°W	Roman Catholic	–	The town's first Roman Catholic church was built in 1925. Intended as a temporary structure, it survives as a church hall, but was deregistered in September 1963 and replaced by a permanent brick church.	
St John's Church (More images)		Piddinghoe; 50.8095°N 0.0355°E	Anglican	I	The round tower and the nave of this riverside church are early-12th-century. A north aisle was added a few years later; its roof descends to a very low level outside. The south aisle and an aisled chancel were built by the 13th century; all were restored in 1882.	
St Michael and All Angels Church (More images)		Plumpton; 50.9051°N 0.0717°W	Anglican	I	This flint, stone and local marble church, surrounded by Plumpton Agricultural College buildings, is isolated from the village. The nave is mostly 12th-century; the buttressed west tower and its spire is a century newer, as is the chancel; a porch and vestry are later additions.	
All Saints Church (More images)		Plumpton Green; 50.9350°N 0.0602°W	Anglican	–	Nikolaus Pevsner thought that Samuel Denman's 1893 church was "plain funny", mainly due to the composition of its octagonal tower. It was originally a chapel of ease to St Michael and All Angels Church, 2 miles (3.2 km) to the south. The ancient font is believed to have come from the old St John sub Castro Church in Lewes.	
St Mary the Virgin Church (More images)		Ringmer; 50.8940°N 0.0544°E	Anglican	I	Norman-era fragments remain in this large church, rebuilt in the 15th century and further altered in 1884 by Ewan Christian. John Christie, founder of the nearby Glyndebourne Opera House, donated the organ.	
St Peter's Church (More images)		Rodmell; 50.8385°N 0.0177°E	Anglican	I	Some windows have been replaced, and the chancel arch was restored during the Victorian era, but otherwise the church has changed little since the late 12th century, when the tower and an adjacent room were added to the slightly older chancel and nave.	
St Leonard's Church (More images)		Seaford; 50.7719°N 0.1013°E	Anglican	I	The size of this church reflects Seaford's medieval importance as a port: the River Ouse's estuary was here until it silted up and moved to Newhaven. The nave and some clerestory windows remain from the Norman era, and a sculpture of Saint Michael battling a dragon has been attributed to 1130. The tower is 15th-century.	
King's Church Seaford (More images)		Seaford; 50.7702°N 0.1017°E	Evangelical	–	King's Church Eastbourne planted a congregation in Seaford in September 2010. The church met in hired premises at first, but in 2019 the former Cross Way Church Centre was purchased and a separate church was formed. It was registered for marriages that October. The building, for which a major rebuilding scheme has been proposed, is an Early English-style former Wesleyan Methodist chapel built in the town centre in 1894, mostly of red brick but with stone dressings. It was registered for marriages in September 1907. Seaford's Methodists now use the Cross Way Clinton Centre, now a joint Methodist and United Reformed church.	
Kingdom Hall (More images)		Seaford; 50.7713°N 0.1003°E	Jehovah's Witnesses	–	This Kingdom Hall serves the Seaford Congregation of Jehovah's Witnesses. It stands on West Street on the town centre, and was registered for worship in October 1983 and for marriages in July 1987.	
Seahaven Islamic Community Centre and Mosque (More images)		Seaford; 50.7725°N 0.1015°E	Muslim	–	This mosque and community centre opened in October 2017 in a building purchased for £300,000. The community had been worshipping in hired premises in Seaford since January 2003.	
St Thomas More Church (More images)		Seaford; 50.7739°N 0.1073°E	Roman Catholic	–	In 1935, James O'Hanlon Hughes and Geoffrey Welch built a simple rectangular church with a rendered exterior with some flintwork. It was registered for marriages in March 1936. In 1969, an extension was built using yellow artificial stone, and the interior was opened up.	
Seaford Independent Spiritualist Church		Seaford; 50.7735°N 0.1032°E	Spiritualist	–	This church was established in 1991. The congregation met in a hall at first, but they later acquired a building (now known as Seafordspirit) in the town centre. Services are held on Thursdays.	
Cross Way Church (More images)		Seaford; 50.7732°N 0.1019°E	Methodist/United Reformed Church	–	The "Cross Way" name has been used since the link was forged between the town's Methodist and United Reformed communities. The Methodists put their former chapel up for sale in 2016 and now worship in this building, designed by W.F. Poulton in 1877 and registered for marriages in February 1880. The Early English-style flint and ashlar chapel's slender buttressed corner turret is distinctive. The roof has king posts and queen posts. Work was carried out in 2016–17 to alter the interior to convert the building into a combined church and community centre.	
Chailey Free Church (More images)		South Chailey; 50.9372°N 0.0192°W	Evangelical	–	This independent Evangelical congregation worships in a modern building on the site of a former mission hall used by Nonconformist groups. This was registered for marriages in 1906 and deregistered in 1992, whereupon the new building was registered in its place.	
St Michael and All Angels Church (More images)		South Malling, Lewes; 50.8812°N 0.0068°E	Anglican	II*	A young John Evelyn laid the foundation stone of the rebuilt church in 1626, but the building has 13th-century origins, and the tower arch and its responds survive from the 14th century. A restoration was carried out in 1874.	
King's Church (More images)		South Malling, Lewes; 50.8778°N 0.0156°E	Evangelical	–	This Charismatic Evangelical community, founded in 1985 and aligned with Newfrontiers and the Evangelical Alliance, worships in an industrial unit. In 2009, planning permission was granted for a nearby industrial building to be converted into a new church, and the move took place soon afterwards. The new church was registered for marriages in May 2010.	
St Peter's Church (More images)		Southease; 50.8295°N 0.0192°E	Anglican	I	Like St Michael's Church in Lewes and St John's Church in Piddinghoe, this ancient building has a round tower. The present nave and chancel are housed in the 11th-century nave, whose accompanying chancel was demolished in the 14th century. Wall murals from about 1280 have been uncovered, and the bell is of the same age, making it one of the oldest in Sussex.	
St John the Baptist's Church (More images)		Southover, Lewes; 50.8691°N 0.0062°E	Anglican	I	Although greatly altered, the building was originally the late-11th-century hospitium of the adjacent Lewes Priory, England's first Cluniac House. Its conversion to a church came in the 13th century. The tower collapsed in 1698 and took 40 years to rebuild. Additions were made in the Neo-Norman style in the 19th century.	
Streat Church (More images)		Streat; 50.9202°N 0.0795°W	Anglican	II*	This modest church, with a nave dating from about 1200, a slightly older chancel and a small belfry with a spire, was heavily restored in 1854; an aisle was added to the nave in that year. In 1882 a porch and vestry were built on the north side.	
St Luke's Church (More images)		Sutton, Seaford; 50.7766°N 0.1278°E	Anglican	–	Part of the combined parish of Sutton with Seaford, this multi-purpose modern brick and flint building, built for £15,791, serves the Chyngton and Sutton areas of the town. It has a rounded tower at one corner. The site was acquired in 1954, the first stone was laid on 8 November 1958 and the church was opened in June 1959. It was designed by John Leopold Denman.	
Seaford Community Church		Sutton, Seaford; 50.7802°N 0.1147°E	Evangelical	–	This independent Evangelical community worships in a modern building on Vale Road in the east of Seaford. Under the name Seaford Evangelical Free Church, it was registered for worship and for marriages in May 1969.	
Chyngton Methodist Church (More images)		Sutton, Seaford; 50.7799°N 0.1273°E	Methodist	–	This church, housed in a multi-purpose building used by many groups from the local community, serves Methodists in the Chyngton and Sutton areas of Seaford. It was registered for worship in July 1955 and for marriages in August 1989.	
St Mary's Church (More images)		Tarring Neville; 50.8157°N 0.0487°E	Anglican	I	There is a nave and south aisle under an undivided roof, chancel and west tower with a tiled pyramidal roof at this 13th-century church near Newhaven. Instead of the usual free-standing font, there is one attached to the aisle wall; this was added in the 14th century.	
St Lawrence's Church (More images)		Telscombe; 50.8128°N 0.0064°W	Anglican	I	The 12th-century church is one of the only buildings in the hamlet, which is reached down a long road from Southease. The nave has one aisle, and there is a chancel with a Lady chapel, a small vestry, porch and tower. The chancel arch looks Norman but is 19th-century; the Lady chapel and north aisle were also rebuilt then.	
Telscombe Cliffs Community Church(More images)		Telscombe Cliffs; 50.7961°N 0.0181°W	United Reformed Church	–	This United Reformed church serves the coastal urban area of Peacehaven and Telscombe Cliffs. With the name Telscombe Cliffs Union Church it was registered for marriages in August 1932.	
St Peter's Church (More images)		West Firle; 50.8450°N 0.0884°E	Anglican	I	One reset doorway, dating from about 1200, is the oldest part of this church. The rest of the structure was built in the late 13th and 14th centuries. The nave has north and south aisles, and there is a vestry and porch. A crenellated tower with substantial buttresses stands at the west end. Adjoining the 13th-century chancel is a private chapel (the Gage Chapel) for members of the Gage baronetcy.	
St Martin's Church (More images)		Westmeston; 50.9067°N 0.0972°W	Anglican	II*	This small church beneath the South Downs serves a long, narrow parish, and administered East Chiltington's church until 1934. The structure is of flint and sandstone, but 19th-century restoration has obscured its original appearance. The nave is mostly 12th-century, but its south aisle was added later.	
St Peter and St John the Baptist's Church (More images)		Wivelsfield; 50.9709°N 0.0952°W	Anglican	II*	Some 11th-century masonry and a doorway remain from the original building. Although it is mostly 13th-century, the present church has parts from a range of architectural eras—the legacy of a 14th-century lengthening, a restoration of 1869, and other work.	
Bethel Strict Baptist Chapel (More images)		Wivelsfield; 50.9627°N 0.0952°W	Baptist	II	The secession of some members from Ditchling's Baptist community in 1763 led to the founding of a new Strict Baptist chapel in nearby Wivelsfield in 1780. The building has one weatherboarded bay but is mostly of brick, and has been enlarged several times from its original rectangular layout. It was registered for marriages in March 1863.	
Ote Hall Chapel (More images)		Wivelsfield; 50.9678°N 0.0907°W	Countess of Huntingdon's Connexion	II	Selina Hastings, Countess of Huntingdon, who lived in the village, founded a chapel for her Calvinist sect in 1778. The glazed brick building was completed in 1780. The windows and original (now blocked) entrance door are round-arched, and the tiled roof is hipped. The chapel was registered for marriages in December 1891.	
Church of Jesus Christ of Latter-day Saints (More images)		Wivelsfield Green; 50.9635°N 0.0733°W	Latter-day Saint	–	In 2000, the Church of Jesus Christ of Latter-day Saints gained planning permission to build a church on a derelict site in the centre of Wivelsfield Green village. It is in the Crawley Stake. The meetinghouse was registered for marriages in May 2005.	

== Former places of worship ==
Former places of worship
Name	Image	Location	Denomination/ Affiliation	Grade	Notes	Refs
St Francis of Assisi Church (More images)		Barcombe Cross; 50.9248°N 0.0196°E	Anglican	–	The settlement of Barcombe Cross developed north of the old village. Squire of Barcombe Sir William Grantham provided built a timber and brick structure to serve it in the late 1890s. It went out of use in about 2003, and is now used as a community hall and meeting place.	
Protestant Dissenters Mission House (More images)		Barcombe Cross; 50.9234°N 0.0110°E	Non-denominational	–	This non-denominational mission chapel was established in the first half of the 19th century on the road from Barcombe Cross to Hamsey. It was latterly re-registered with the name Mission Hall in April 1947, but is no longer in religious use.	
Beulah Strict Baptist Chapel		Ditchling; 50.9222°N 0.1142°W	Baptist	–	George Grenyer built a chapel for the Strict Baptist community on East End Lane in 1867. After its closure in the late 1930s it became a private house.	
St John the Evangelist's Church (More images)		East Blatchington; 50.7767°N 0.0975°E	Anglican	–	This church was built in the mid-1920s as a second church within the parish of East Blatchington, but closed in 1980. It is now used as a nursery school. The building has a roughcast exterior and tiled roof.	
All Saints Church (More images)		Lewes; 50.8724°N 0.0134°E	Anglican	II*	This building—an accumulation of parts from several eras—has been used as an arts and community centre since its redundancy in 1975. The 16th-century flint tower was retained when Amon Wilds built a new nave in 1806; an Early English-style chancel followed in 1883.	
Providence Baptist Chapel		Lewes; 50.8760°N 0.0112°E	Baptist	–	This chapel is now a theatre auditorium. It closed in 1932 after about 70 years of religious use. The building, of blue and red brick, stands on Lancaster Street.	
Providence Strict Baptist Chapel		Lewes; 50.8752°N 0.0121°E	Baptist	–	Opened with the name Gospel Temperance Mission Hall in 1906, this Vernacular-style flint and brick building served as a Baptist chapel from 1924 until about 1980, after which it was converted for residential use.	
Wesleyan Methodist Chapel (More images)		Lewes; 50.8727°N 0.0110°E	Methodist	–	An 18th-century Countess of Huntingdon's Connexion chapel stood on this site; it was taken over by Methodists in 1807 and demolished in 1867 when the present building was built. The Early English-style red-brick and stone building was closed in 1973 and became an antiques centre, then flats.	
Hamilton Memorial Presbyterian Church (More images)		Lewes; 50.8741°N 0.0117°E	Presbyterian Church of England	–	This large chapel, closed in the 1940s, has also become an antiques showroom and market. It is in the Renaissance style and is mostly of brick. It had been registered for marriages in February 1869.	
Calvinistic Baptist Chapel		Newhaven; 50.7918°N 0.0493°E	Baptist	–	This was built in 1904 on the town's Norman Road. The red-brick structure was distinguished by the Dutch gable on the façade. It was closed in 1976 and later became a house.	
Congregational Chapel		Newhaven; 50.7930°N 0.0488°E	Congregational	–	After its closure in 1938, this Neoclassical building was restored and turned into a market, but this has now closed. Horatio Nelson Goulty designed and built the rendered stone chapel in 1866. It was not officially deregistered for worship until 1973.	
Newhaven Methodist Church (More images)		Newhaven; 50.7930°N 0.0513°E	Methodist	–	Charles Bell's 1893 church for the Methodist community has become a Sea Cadets headquarters since its closure in 1940. Yellow and red brick, stone and terracotta were used in the design. A rose window remains above the entrance.	
Primitive Methodist Chapel		Newhaven; 50.7928°N 0.0506°E	Methodist	–	Newhaven's first Methodist chapel dates from 1885. Architect W.S. Parnacott was commissioned; his design was in the Gothic Revival style and incorporated a hall. It is no longer in religious use and has been significantly altered.	
Church of the Sacred Heart (More images)		Newhaven; 50.7900°N 0.0514°E	Roman Catholic	–	Newhaven's Roman Catholic church was built in 1898 to the design of W. H. Romaine-Walker and was registered for marriages in July 1909. The flint and brick structure is in the Neo-Norman style with round-headed windows, and was extended and altered in the 20th century. The church closed in 2019.	
Convent Chapel of the Sacred Heart		Newhaven; 50.7927°N 0.0463°E	Roman Catholic	–	Newhaven's first Roman Catholic place of worship was designed in about 1878 by a French architect whose name does not survive in any records. It is Romanesque Revival in style and has an apsidal end and rendered walls. It fell out of use in about 1943 and was later used as a library and an arts centre.	
Zion Chapel (More images)		Newick; 50.9746°N 0.0091°E	Baptist	II	This modest brick-built chapel dates from 1834 and was registered for marriages in July 1837. It has a large pediment, an entrance porch and a cemetery at the rear. In 2001, planning permission was granted for conversion into flats.	
St Mary the Virgin Church (Church of Our Lady Queen of Heaven) (More images)		North Chailey; 50.9721°N 0.0218°W	Anglican and Roman Catholic	II	Built in 1876 in the 13th-century style by John Oldrid Scott, this chapel of ease to St Peter's Church was used by Anglicans until 1976, after which it was leased to the Catholic Church. They registered it with the name Church of St Mary the Virgin with Our Lady Queen of Heaven in January 1980; this registration was cancelled in August 1990 and the building was sold. The sandstone church has a saddleback roof.	
Rehoboth Independent Congregational Chapel (More images)		Ringmer; 50.8940°N 0.0597°E	Congregational	–	The present red-brick building was converted into a house in 1995. It dates from 1914, and stands on the site of a predecessor which was built in 1834.	
Congregational Chapel (More images)		South Heighton; 50.8074°N 0.0577°E	Congregational	–	This small brick chapel in the village of South Heighton, now part of Newhaven, was erected in 1891. It fell out of use in the mid-20th century and is now in residential use.	
Southover General Baptist Chapel (More images)		Southover, Lewes; 50.8700°N 0.0082°E	Baptist	II	This chapel was converted into a house in 1972 after more than 200 years as a place of worship. It was built in 1741 as the first Baptist chapel in the Lewes area, and retains its knapped flintwork, original hipped roof and door, which has been reset in a modern weatherboarded porch. This one of the meeting places of the Salvation Army in the town.	
St Bartholomew's Church (More images)		Spithurst; 50.9391°N 0.0284°E	Anglican	–	Henry Card, a local man, designed this Early English-style flint church in 1880 to serve the hamlet of Spithurst in Barcombe parish. It was declared redundant in 1994 but is still used by the Diocese of Chichester as a retreat and youth centre.	

== See also ==
- Media related to Places of worship in Lewes District at Wikimedia Commons
- List of demolished places of worship in East Sussex

== Bibliography ==
- Antram, Nicholas; Pevsner, Nikolaus (2013). Sussex: East with Brighton and Hove. The Buildings of England. London: Yale University Press. ISBN 978-0-300-18473-0.
- Chambers, Ralph (1953). The Strict Baptist Chapels of England: Sussex. Vol. 2. Thornton Heath: Ralph Chambers.
- Cheal, Henry (1901). The History of Ditchling in the County of Sussex. Lewes: Lewes & South Counties Press Ltd (facsimile published 2004 by Country Books, Bakewell). ISBN 1-898941-89-0.
- Elleray, D. Robert (2004). Sussex Places of Worship. Worthing: Optimus Books. ISBN 0-9533132-7-1.
- Kelly, Bernard W. (1907). Historical Notes on English Catholic Missions (PDF). London: Kegan Paul, Trench, Trübner & Co.
- Lindsey, Joyce (1983). Newick: The Story of a Sussex Village c. 900–1950. Newick: Newick Parish Council.
- Methodist Church of Great Britain (1947). Methodist Church Buildings: Statistical Returns including Seating Accommodation as at July 1st, 1940 (PDF). Manchester: The Department for Chapel Affairs. (Available online in 14 parts; Guide to abbreviations on page 6)
- Pé, Diana (2006). Mid Sussex Church Walks. PP (Pé Publishing). ISBN 0-9543690-2-5.
- Stell, Christopher (2002). Nonconformist Chapels and Meeting-houses in Eastern England. Swindon: English Heritage. ISBN 1-873592-50-7.
- The Diocese of Arundel & Brighton (2020). Diocese of Arundel & Brighton Catholic Directory 2020. Purley: Roman Catholic Diocese of Arundel and Brighton.
- Vigar, John E. (1986). Exploring Sussex Churches. Rainham: Meresborough Books. ISBN 0-948193-09-3.
- Vigar, John (1994). The Lost Villages of Sussex. Stanbridge: The Dovecote Press Ltd. ISBN 1-874336-29-6.
