= Huntingdonian =

Huntingdonian may relate to:

- Huntingdon, a town in England
- Countess of Huntingdon's Connexion, a group of evangelical churches
