= South Street Free Church, Eastbourne =

South Street Free Church
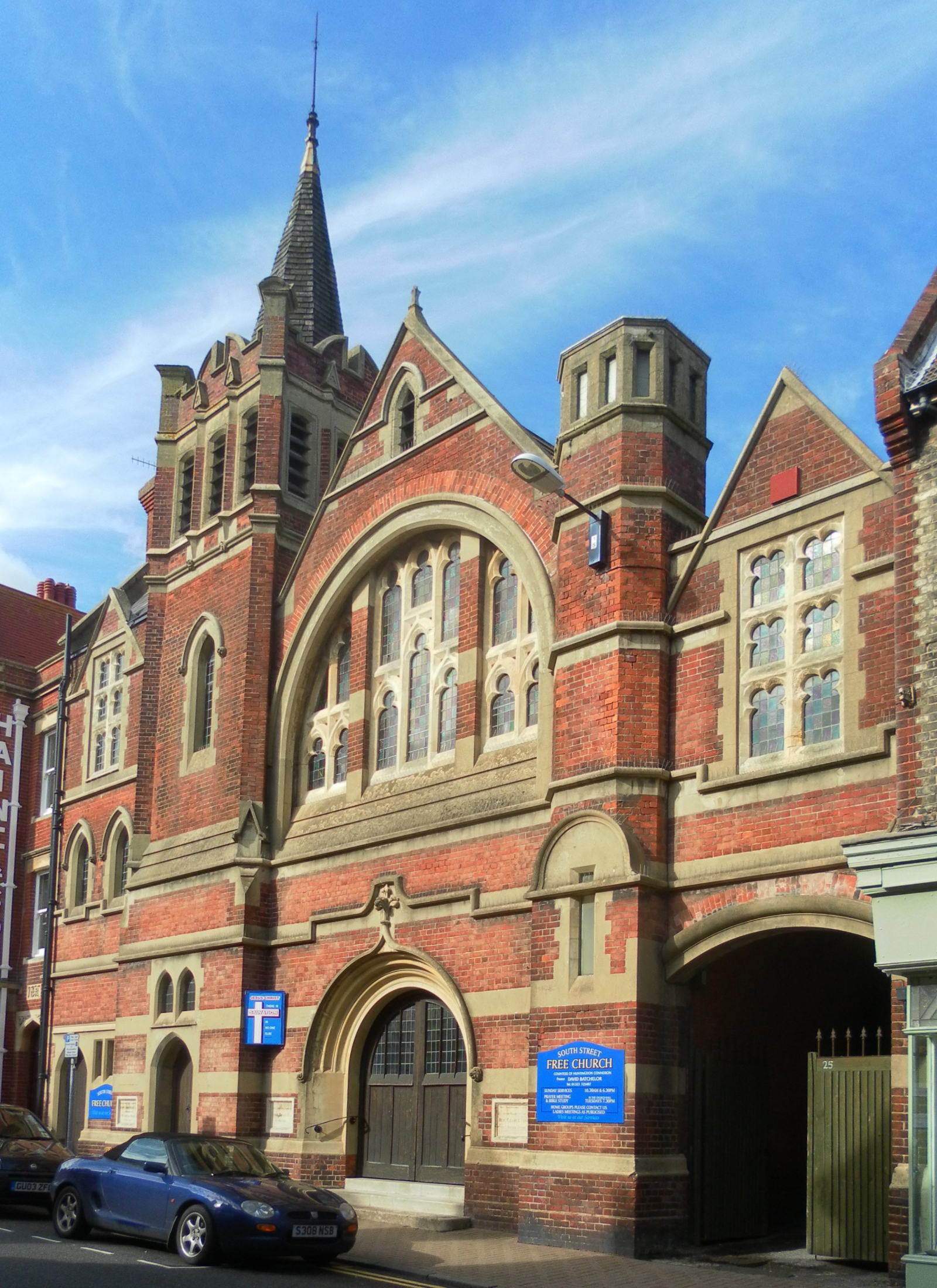
- The church from the southeast

- 50°46′00″N 0°16′46″E
- Location: 21 South Street, Eastbourne, East Sussex BN21 4UP
- Country: England
- Denomination: Countess of Huntingdon's Connexion
- Previous denomination: Congregational
- Website: southstreetfreechurch.org

History
- Status: Church
- Founded: 1897
- Founder: Reverend George Thompson

Architecture
- Functional status: Active
- Heritage designation: Grade II
- Designated: 8 May 2009
- Architect: Henry Ward
- Style: Arts and Crafts
- Years built: 1903
- Groundbreaking: 6 May 1903
- Completed: 1904

Clergy
- Pastor: David Batchelor

South Street Free Church is a church in the centre of Eastbourne, a town and seaside resort in the English county of East Sussex. Originally Congregational, it is now aligned to the Countess of Huntingdon's Connexion—a small group of Evangelical churches founded by Selina Hastings, Countess of Huntingdon during the 18th-century Evangelical Revival. The church was founded in 1897 as an offshoot from an earlier Congregational chapel, and initially met in hired premises. Local architect Henry Ward designed the present church in 1903; the "characterful" and "quirky" Arts and Crafts-style building has been listed at Grade II by Historic England for its architectural and historical importance.

== History ==
A Congregational church was built on Pevensey Road near Eastbourne town centre in 1862. (Note: This closed in 1973 and was demolished in 1977.) In 1897, some members left and founded a new church, initially based on Saffrons Road in the former St. Peter's Church. This was an Anglican church built of red brick and tile in 1878 to the design of Henry Currey as a chapel of ease to St Saviour's Church; it had been superseded by a new building in the Meads area of town in 1894. After the Church of England disposed of it, the building had been acquired by Eastbourne Council and had been renamed Grove Hall. The council rented the premises to the new church, which had elected Reverend George Thompson as its first pastor.

The congregation sought a permanent building of their own, and began the process in 1903 when local architect Henry Ward was commissioned to design a church on a site on South Street, close to the existing premises on Saffrons Road. The land had previously been occupied by a blacksmith's forge. The foundation stone was laid by Reverend Thompson on 6 May 1903; it recorded the names of Henry Ward, the architect, and the building firm Padgham and Hutchinson of St Leonards-on-Sea. The congregation moved into the new building in 1904. At first it was named New Congregational Church.

Reverend George Thompson retired in 1907, and after a period without a pastor the chapel appointed Reverend J. Westbury Jones as minister in 1914. At the same time the Countess of Huntingdon's Connexion took responsibility for the church. This denomination was founded by Selina Hastings, Countess of Huntingdon in the 18th century. Born in 1707, she embraced Methodist ideas, but in the following decade—influenced by the preaching of George Whitefield—she moved towards more Calvinistic doctrines, and in 1783 she formally founded her Connexion. The denomination was, and remains, Evangelical and "rigidly Calvinistic" in nature.

In 1918, Reverend Frederick Hastings became the minister. He remained in service in Eastbourne until his death at the age of 98 in 1937. The chapel then closed during World War II, and the building suffered structural deterioration. The fabric was repaired, and under a succession of postwar ministers the church continued to increase its membership. The most recent pastor, David Batchelor, was appointed in October 2010 after graduating from Oak Hill Theological College.

== Architecture and heritage ==
Henry Ward ariba moved from his home city of London to Hastings in the 1870s and became Hastings Borough Surveyor in 1881. He designed many religious and secular buildings in Hastings, St Leonards-on-Sea, Bexhill-on-Sea and Eastbourne as well as further afield. Apart from South Street Free Church, he designed Sedlescombe United Reformed Church (1879), Robertson Street United Reformed Church in Hastings (1884), St. John's Congregational Church in Bexhill-on-Sea (1897), St. Stephen's Anglican church in the same town (1898), Redlake Congregational Church in Ore (1903; demolished) and Hollingrove Congregational Church in Brightling (1909).

South Street Free Church was designed in a "heavy" Arts and Crafts style with elements of Gothic Revival architecture, described as "Free Gothic" rather than aligned to any particular historic era. The building is of red brick with stone dressings and horizontal bands. The windows are set in stone surrounds with mullions and transoms. The "quirky", "busy" façade has a "characterful asymmetry": it consists of five bays of unequal width and height. From left (west) to right, there is a narrow bay with a "domestic character", topped by a small gable and with a pair of small arched windows; a short tower with a louvres and a recessed spire; the main entrance bay, with a wide gable and windows set in a large semicircular arched recess; a short turret with a polygonal stone upper stage; and a low gabled section with similar fenestration to the westernmost bay. In the narrow street, with tall buildings on both sides of the church, the tower serves as a landmark without dominating the church or its surroundings.

Inside, the nave is of five bays with arcades on both sides supporting a gallery: this runs around three sides, although the western section has been altered. The original organ and pulpit have been replaced, but the gallery fronts (with bands of quatrefoil decoration, pews and some other fittings) are original. The interior is lit by segmental-arched clerestory windows. There is an apse at the east end. The timber roof is supported by arch-braced trusses.

The church was listed in Grade II on 8 May 2009. Such buildings are defined as "nationally important and of special interest". As of February 2021, it was one of 100 Grade II listed buildings, and 109 listed buildings of all grades, in the borough of Eastbourne.

== Administration ==
The church is registered for worship in accordance with the Places of Worship Registration Act 1855; its number on the register is 40103. Under the name New Congregational Church it was registered for the solemnisation of marriages in accordance with the Marriage Act 1836 on 22 December 1904. As of 2022, it was one of 22 churches in England that are part of the Countess of Huntington's Connexion. The counties of East and West Sussex are the denomination's hotbed: other Connexion chapels in Sussex are at Bells Yew Green, Bolney, Copthorne, Hailsham, Shoreham-by-Sea, Turners Hill and Wivelsfield (Ote Hall Chapel).

Morning and evening services are held in the church every Sunday. Two of these services per month include Holy Communion. Prayer meetings take place every Tuesday evening. Monthly services are also held at four different care homes in the town. A youth group meets weekly in the church, and other regular events include a lunch club for elderly people and a discussion group open to members of the public.

== See also ==
- List of places of worship in Eastbourne
- Listed buildings in Eastbourne

== Bibliography ==
- Antram, Nicholas; Pevsner, Nikolaus (2013). Sussex: East with Brighton and Hove. The Buildings of England. London: Yale University Press. ISBN 978-0-300-18473-0.
- Berry, Patricia; Gordon, Kevin (1996). Britain in Old Photographs: Around Eastbourne. Stroud: Sutton Publishing. ISBN 0-7509-1272-3.
- Elleray, D. Robert (1981). The Victorian Churches of Sussex. Chichester: Phillimore & Co. Ltd. ISBN 0-85033-378-4.
- Elleray, D. Robert (2004). Sussex Places of Worship. Worthing: Optimus Books. ISBN 0-9533132-7-1.
