= Ditchling Unitarian Chapel =

Church in East Sussex, England

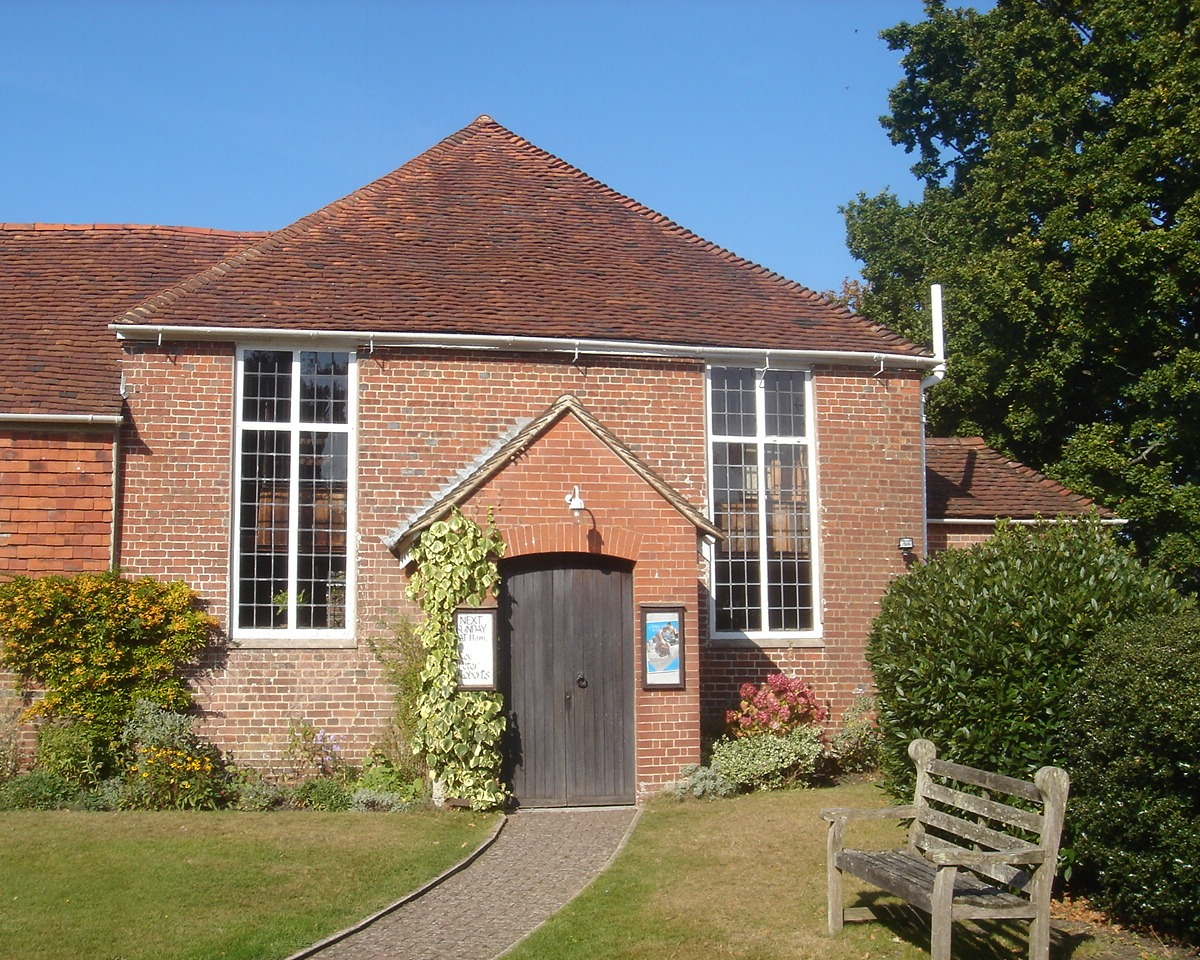
- The chapel from the east

- Location of the chapel within East Sussex
- 50.9216°N 0.1131°W
- OS grid reference: TQ 32722 15268
- Location: The Old Meeting House, The Twitten, Ditchling, East Sussex BN6 8UJ
- Country: England
- Denomination: Unitarian
- Previous denomination: General Baptist
- Website: ditchlingunitarians.org.uk

History
- Former name: Ditchling General Baptist Chapel
- Status: Chapel
- Founded: 17th century (congregation); 1730 (present chapel)
- Founder: Robert Chatfeild [sic]

Architecture
- Functional status: Active
- Heritage designation: Grade II
- Designated: 27 September 1979
- Style: Vernacular
- Groundbreaking: c. 1734
- Completed: c. 1734

Ditchling Unitarian Chapel (formerly Ditchling General Baptist Chapel, and also known as The Old Meeting House) is a Unitarian chapel in Ditchling, a village in the English county of East Sussex. A congregation of General Baptists began to meet in the 17th century in the village, which was a local centre for Protestant Nonconformist worship, and by the time the present simple Vernacular-style chapel was constructed in 1740 a large proportion of the population held Baptist beliefs. Along with other General Baptist chapels in Sussex, the congregation moved towards Unitarian views in the mid-18th century; this caused a schism which resulted in a new chapel being formed at nearby Wivelsfield. The character of the Ditchling chapel was wholly Unitarian by 1800, and it has continued under various names since then. People associated with the chapel include William Hale White (the author "Mark Rutherford"), Henry Acton, Adrian Boult—who was married there—and G. K. Chesterton. The chapel is set back from Ditchling's main street and has an adjoining house (built in 1672) and graveyard, all of which contribute to the character of the conservation area which covers the centre of Ditchling village. English Heritage has listed the chapel at Grade II for its architectural and historical importance.

== History ==
In England, people and ministers who worshipped outside the Church of England but were not part of the Roman Catholic Church were historically known as Dissenters or (Protestant) Nonconformists. Nonconformism became officially recognised after the Act of Uniformity 1662, which removed from their living those Church of England ministers who refused to recognise or abide by the Act's requirements. Many alternative denominations developed, all focused on a person's personal relationship with God rather than on the rites and ceremonies of religious worship as in the Anglican and Roman Catholic churches. This trend was seen throughout Sussex, and by the late 17th century "the all-embracing medieval Church" existed alongside dozens of newly established groups and denominations.

Ditchling was a local centre for Protestant Dissent: 64 residents of the parish declared themselves Nonconformists in a religious census of 1676. In 1724, 25 families out of 80 identified as Anabaptists (a term often used at the time in reference to various Baptist groups). One such group was the General Baptists. First identified by this name in the 17th century, General Baptists believed in unlimited atonement rather than the Calvinist view of salvation for those who have been so destined by God (limited atonement). The movement was popular in Sussex, where radical preacher Matthew Caffyn was influential. A congregation of General Baptists is known to have existed in Ditchling in the late 17th century, because in 1696 some of its members voted at the General Baptist Assembly against its proposal to exclude Caffyn. His unorthodox, rapidly changing beliefs had caused a schism in the Assembly, and its response to his new theology was significant in the development of Unitarianism in the 18th century. Worshippers apparently came to the village from all over Sussex and neighbouring counties: attendance and baptism records identify church members from such distant places as Sevenoaks and Cranbrook (Kent), Charlwood and Godstone (Surrey) and Battle, Walberton, Crawley and Pulborough (Sussex) as well as neighbouring villages such as Keymer, Westmeston and Streat. There was no purpose-built chapel in the 17th century, though: a cottage built in 1672 on a twitten (narrow lane) off East End Lane may have served as the congregation's meeting place. In 1716, the group registered another house in the village as a place of worship. The Jointure, a timber-framed 16th-century building on the site of a Wealden hall house (of which some traces remain), was owned by a family of Dissenters. (In the 20th century it was the home of artist Frank Brangwyn for several decades.)

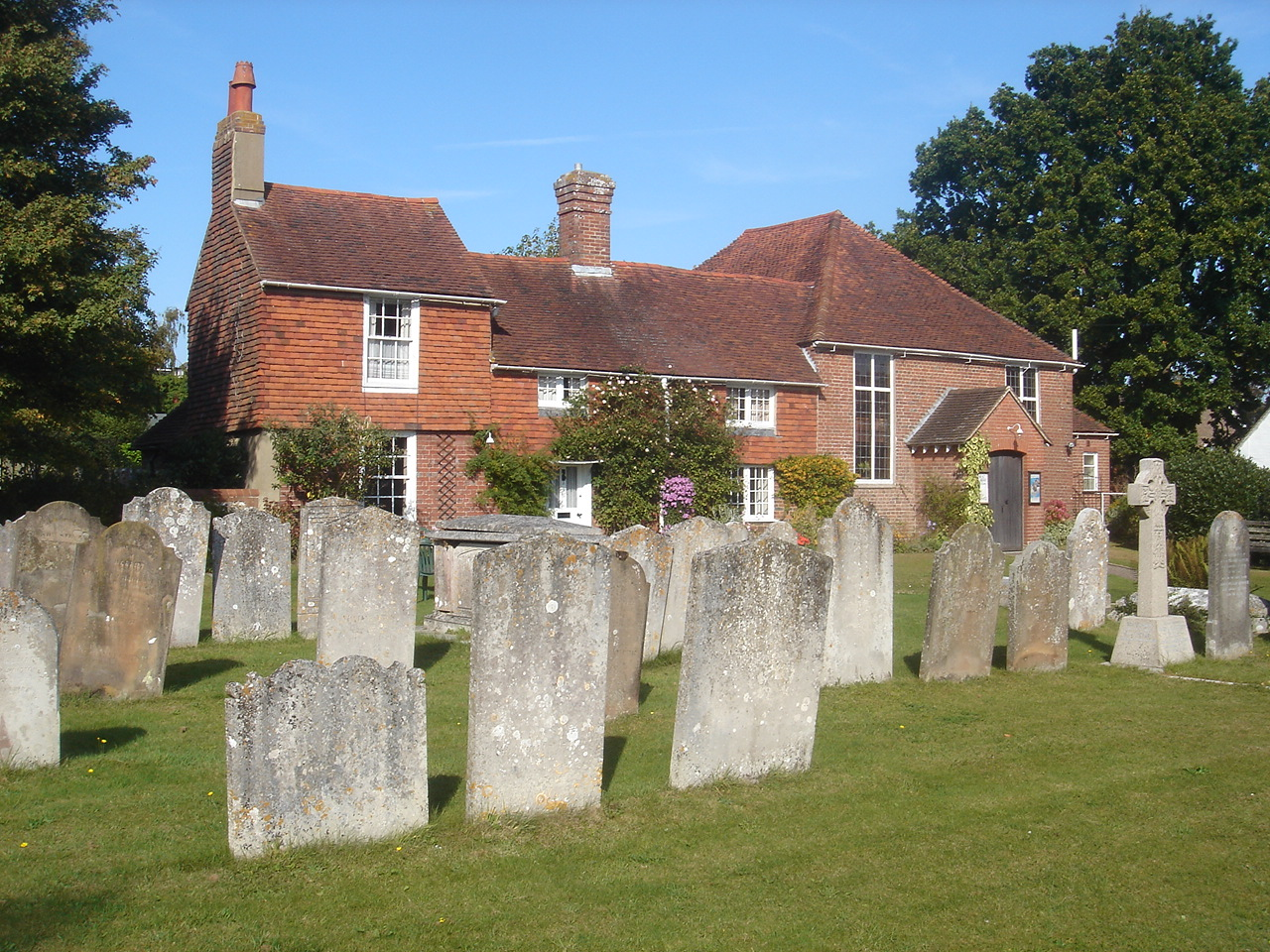
The chapel (right) was built on to the site of an earlier cottage (centre) which was later extended to the south (left).

The present chapel was founded by Robert Chatfeild [sic] of nearby Streat, who was born and baptised in Ditchling in 1675. In 1730, he took copyhold tenure of the land next to the 1672 cottage off East End Lane. Some sources suggest he built the chapel on to the side of the house in 1740, but his will of 24 February 1734 indicated that it already existed by then, and William Evershed preached there in 1736. (Evershed, an important figure in Sussex Nonconformism, later founded Billingshurst Unitarian Chapel). Chatfeild's son, Robert junior, acquired the freehold of the land in 1740; he passed it to the trustees of the chapel, who were said in 1901 to have "a singularly open trust deed ... when the number of trustees are reduced to five they are required to choose 12 more to act with them, the property to be applied to such charitable uses as [they] think most proper".

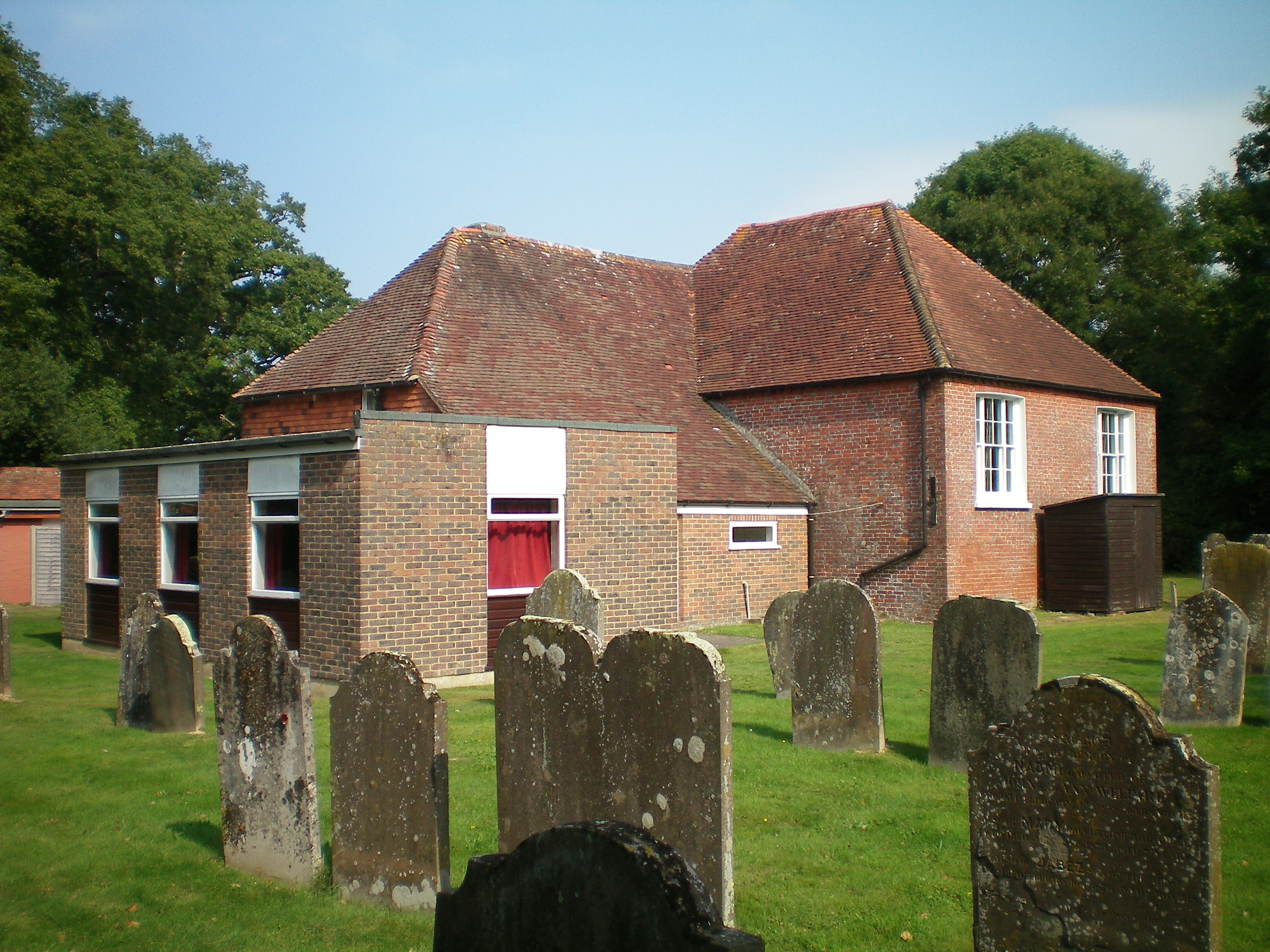
Some members of Ditchling chapel disagreed with the move towards Unitarianism, seceded from it and founded Bethel Chapel at nearby Wivelsfield.

The first written record of the chapel dates from 1737, when a list of members received into the congregation was started. In its early years, the Ditchling cause was associated with Southover General Baptist Chapel in Lewes (built 1741), whose congregation later moved towards Unitarianism and joined the Westgate Unitarian Chapel in 1825. This move from Baptist beliefs towards Unitarianism, influenced by Matthew Caffyn's teachings in the late 17th century, was seen in many General Baptist congregations in Sussex in the 18th century; at Ditchling it was already underway by the time Chatfeild built the chapel, and by 1762 a wholly Unitarian character had been adopted. This was unpopular with some members of the congregation, whose views were more closely aligned with Calvinism. In 1762, Henry Booker—a member and occasional preacher at the chapel—travelled to Brighton and heard the Calvinist George Whitefield speaking. He underwent a spiritual conversion and aligned himself to the Strict Baptist movement. Declaring that he would "tear [the Ditchling] church to pieces", he and several other members seceded from it and founded a new Strict Baptist chapel at nearby Wivelsfield. Under the name Bethel Chapel, this is still used as a Strict Baptist place of worship.

The chapel at Ditchling was situated in a field called Gunsfield. In 1821, most of this land was turned into a graveyard. It replaced the original burial ground, which was full by 1760, and a small private plot "scarcely larger than the space covered by a small room" which had been created soon afterwards for the Browne family. This is on the other side of The Twitten from the main graveyard. The oldest headstones in the original part of the burial ground date from 1730 and 1731. In 1815–16, some of the Gunsfield land had been used by Robert Chatfeild junior's sons John and Robert to build a pair of single-sex schools. They were Free Schools, funded by contributions from the chapel congregation and other donations. The boys' school was finished in 1815, and the girls' building was ready the year after. They were initially successful—Thomas Walker Horsfield noted that "at one time half the people of Ditchling were educated there"—but by the 1830s they were struggling financially, partly due to the sudden death of the rector of Westmeston who had been a major financial supporter. Both schools closed in about 1836, when a National School (not associated with the chapel) was opened elsewhere in the village. The cottage of 1672, a timber-framed and wattle and daub building, was extended on its south side in 1808. The new section, taller than the original building, was built of brick and tiles. It housed the Elder of the chapel, who later became the schoolmaster.

The religious character of the chapel has been Unitarian since the 18th century. At times during its history, it has been referred to as a Unitarian and Free Christian or simply Free Christian chapel. This means that members do not adopt a particular statement of faith or set of beliefs: the Bible and personal interpretation of it are considered the sole authority for their views. Services are held on Sunday mornings at 11.00am. The chapel was registered for marriages on 29 December 1837, and people married here include the conductor Sir Adrian Boult in 1933. The author William Hale White, who used the pseudonym Mark Rutherford, fellow writers John Middleton Murry and G. K. Chesterton, and Reginald Sorensen, Baron Sorensen mp had links to the chapel or visited it at various times.

The chapel is licensed for worship in accordance with the Places of Worship Registration Act 1855 and has the registration number 35608.

== Heritage status ==
Under the name The Old Meeting House, the chapel and the adjoining house were jointly listed at Grade II by English Heritage on 3 February 1977. This defines it as a "nationally important" building of "special interest". As of February 2001, it was one of 1,162 Grade II listed buildings, and 1,250 listed buildings of all grades, in the district of Lewes—the local authority in which Ditchling is situated.

According to Lewes District Council, the local authority which designated Ditchling village centre as a conservation area, its "special architectural and historic interest" derives in part from its long history of Nonconformism and the three surviving places of worship—a Quaker meeting house and the Emmanuel Evangelical Fellowship Chapel as well as the Unitarian chapel. The chapel graveyard is described as "one of Ditchling's most attractive open spaces" and "a characterful spot that provides a fine setting for the building", particularly as the village lacks public open space beyond the village green and St Margaret's churchyard.

== Architecture and description ==
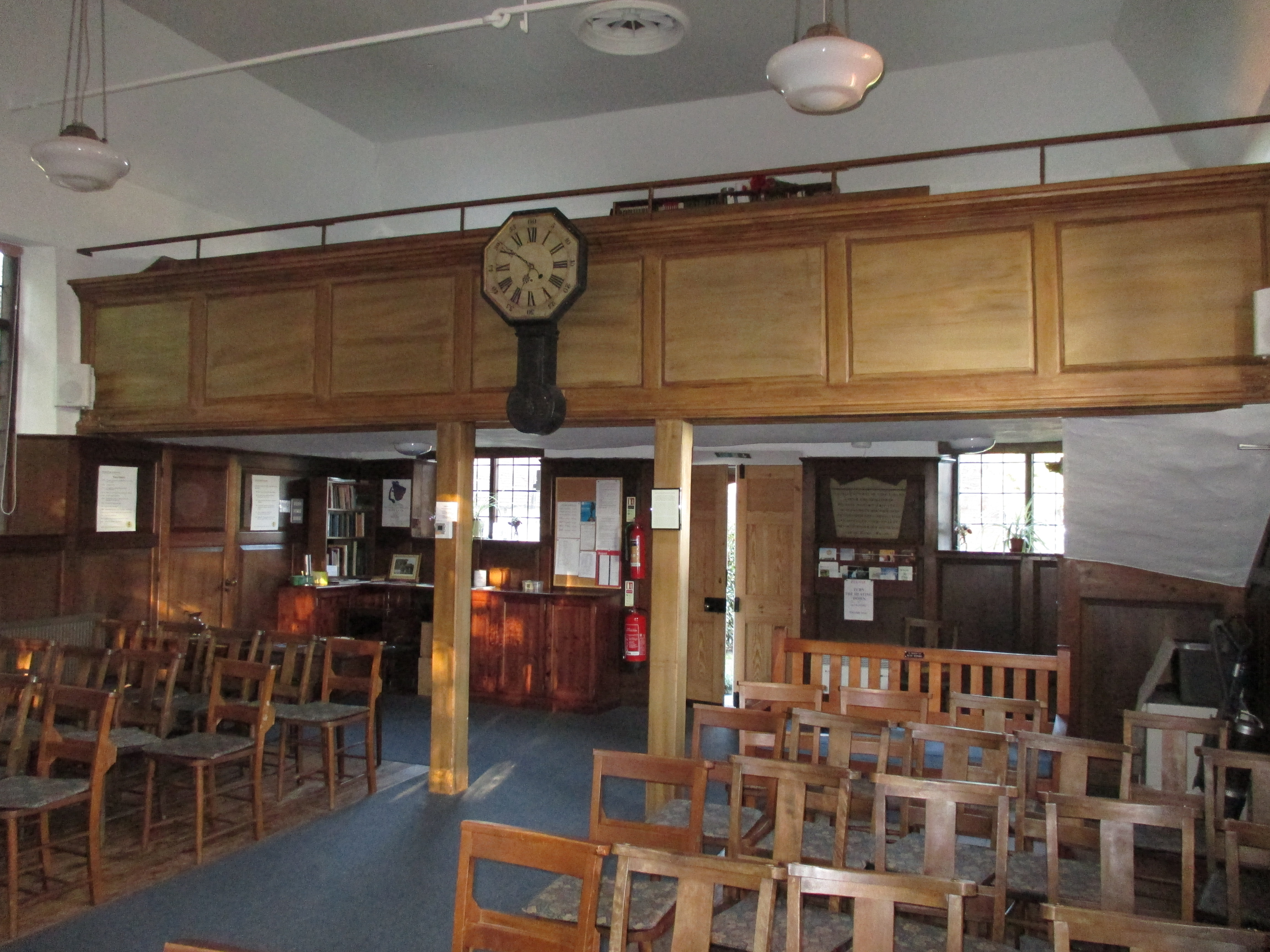
The interior of the chapel, showing the gallery

The chapel and cottage are set back from East End Lane on slightly higher ground. Historically, the standard building materials used for Nonconformist chapels in Sussex were brick and tiles for the walls and roof respectively. This applies at Ditchling, where the Old Meeting House is entirely brick-built with some stucco applied to the west and south walls. The brickwork is in the English bond pattern, and the roof is hipped. The entrance was originally on the north side and has a blocked doorway (bricked up in 1819) and two timber-framed windows with segmental arches. A new entrance was created in the east wall in the 19th century when a footpath from East End Lane was moved; it is set into a porch dated 1877 flanked by two long windows whose upper sections were inserted later. The other façades have segmental-arched windows similar to those on the north side. All windows are casements.

The interior dimensions are 22 1/2 by 33 3/4 feet (6.9 m × 10.3 m). Its present appearance dates from a reordering in 1877. Across the east end is a panelled timber gallery and a cornice with decorative moulding. There was originally a baptistery (no longer extant) on the south side. The roof is of the king post type. Fixtures include a 17th-century moulded oak Communion table, wooden pews with straight backs in the gallery, and an 18th-century clock which was originally in Southwick General Baptist Chapel in Wiltshire. As well as the graves and monuments in the burial ground, there are memorials in and on the outside walls of the chapel. Michael Marten (d. 1775), his wife (d. 1785) and six children are commemorated on a stone inside, and on the outside of the north wall are memorial stones to Josiah (d. 1802) and Sarah (d. 1813) Dancy and an unknown member (whose mid 18th-century memorial is badly weathered).

The cottage was built in 1672 and adjoins the chapel on the south side. It is two storeys high, of brick with a tile-hung top floor and a roof of tiles. The extension of 1808 is similar.

== See also ==
- List of places of worship in Lewes (district)
