= Broad Oak, Kent =

Village in Kent, England

Coordinates: 51.311°N 1.108°E

Broad Oak
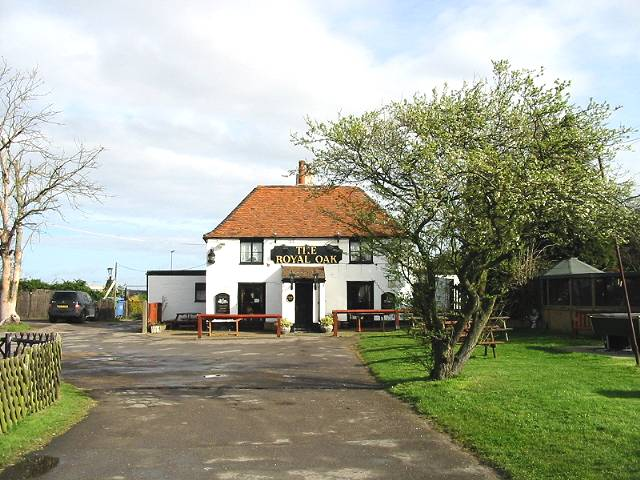
- The Royal Oak pub, Broad Oak

- Location within Kent
- OS grid reference: TR167615
- District: Canterbury
- Shire county: Kent
- Region: South East
- Country: England
- Sovereign state: United Kingdom
- Post town: CANTERBURY
- Postcode district: CT2
- Dialling code: 01227
- Police: Kent
- Fire: Kent
- Ambulance: South East Coast
- UK Parliament: Herne Bay and Sandwich

Broad Oak is a village in Sturry parish, Kent, England. It lies west of the A291 road to Herne Bay; the centre of the village is about half a mile northwest of the northern edge of Sturry village.

Mead Manor is 14th century and mentioned in the Domesday Book.

Broad Oak Chapel, built in 1867, is a Chapel of the Countess of Huntingdon's Connexion.

There are two pubs in the village, The Royal Oak and The Golden Lion. However, The Royal Oak has been closed for some time and is currently subject to a planning application for redevelopment of the site.

Despite recent developments on the top of the hill (which consists of a new build housing estate and a Tesco, the village has many areas of natural beauty. It has connections with footpaths and circular routes with the woods to the north and a valley that circles round the hill. A small stream runs through the base of the valley, which lies between the fields and waters crops such as corn, wheat, and recently sunflowers.

Local residents are concerned by proposed development of the land, and potential harm to the natural environment.
