= Zion Chapel, Newick =

Zion Chapel
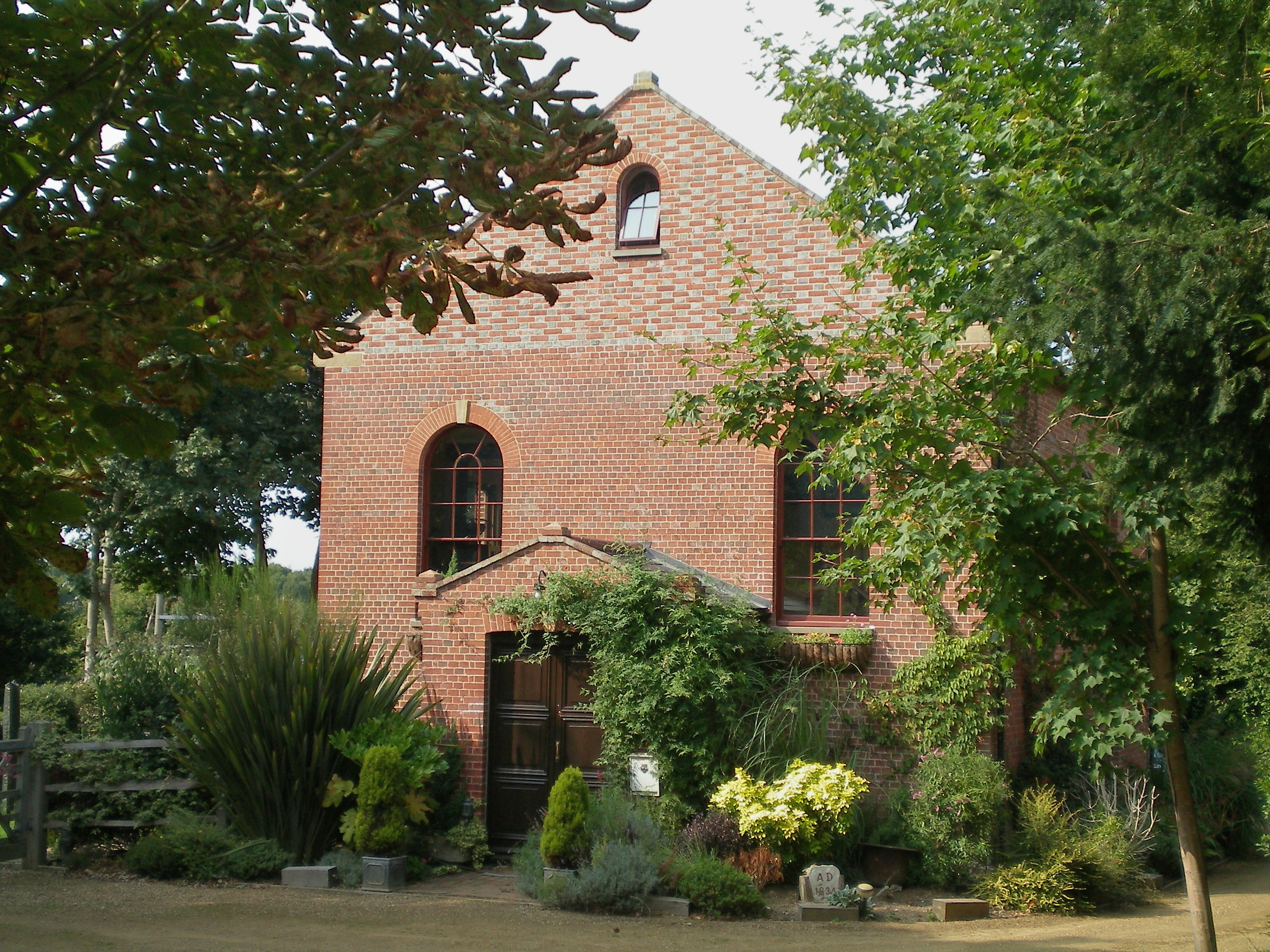
- The chapel from the southeast
- Zion Chapel
- 50.9746°N 0.0091°E
- Location: Western Road, Newick, East Sussex BN8 4LF
- Country: England
- Denomination: Baptist

History
- Status: Former chapel
- Founded: 14 October 1833

Architecture
- Functional status: Residential conversion
- Heritage designation: Grade II
- Designated: 27 September 1979
- Style: Classical
- Completed: 1834
- Closed: 2001

Zion Chapel is a former Strict Baptist place of worship in the village of Newick in Lewes District, one of six local government districts in the English county of East Sussex. The tiny building was opened for worship in 1834 in a part of Sussex which was a hotbed of Protestant Nonconformism, and remained as one of three places of worship in the small Wealden village until 2001, when it was sold for conversion to houses. The chapel is protected as a Grade II listed building.

== History ==
Newick lies north of Lewes next to the River Ouse in the Sussex Weald. Although it is not named in the Domesday survey of 1086, it may have been considered part of a nearby settlement called Allington. It was closely associated with the nearby villages of Barcombe and Hamsey in medieval times. A church existed by 1147, when William de Warenne, 2nd Earl of Surrey granted it to Lewes Priory.

From the 17th century, Protestant Nonconformity became prevalent throughout Sussex, especially in central and eastern parts of the county. Small chapels were regularly built for followers of denominations such as General Baptists, Strict Baptists, Quakers, Presbyterians, Congregationalists and Methodists, often in small villages. One such chapel was founded in 1834 on the main road from Haywards Heath to Uckfield, west of the centre of Newick village. Neither its founder nor its architect are recorded. The founding date is considered to be 14 October 1833, when a rood of land (0.25 acres (0.1 ha)) was granted to "certain dissenters from the Church of England called Calvinistic Baptists" to build a chapel for their use. They had to pay the Lord of the manor £0.2s.6d for this right. The date of construction was recorded on the entrance porch. The population at that time was 724; by 1851 this had fallen to 483, and a population of 1,000 was only reached by 1931—by which time an Evangelical mission hall, opened in 1892, had become Newick's third place of worship.

The religious census of Sussex in 1851 recorded that the chapel had 300 sittings, 250 of which were free; and attendances at morning and afternoon services were given as 130 and 50 respectively. The building was also used for Sunday school scholars, but attendance figures were not given on the census return by the minister John Poynder, who also stated that the average attendance was considerably affected by "the weather and other things attached to our locality".

Zion Chapel served the Strict Baptist congregation throughout the 20th century, in common with similar chapels in nearby Wivelsfield, Lewes, Handcross, Burgess Hill, Uckfield, East Grinstead, Bolney and many other towns and villages in Sussex. Over time, its congregation dwindled, and in 2001 the decision was taken to sell the building. Its Grade II listed status, granted on 27 September 1979, offered some protection against demolition or significant alteration. Approval was granted by Lewes District Council for an extension of the structure and conversion into three houses under the name Chapel Grove.

== Architecture ==
The chapel is a small and simple but "striking red and grey brick building". The street-facing façade has two round-arched windows and a gabled entrance porch inscribed with the year 1834. Above this is a pediment, flush with the façade, whose tympanum has an oculus-style recess. A distinctive feature of the pediment is its use of alternate grey and red bricks laid in Flemish bond pattern; the stretcher bricks (those with the long face showing) are red and the header bricks (whose short side is showing) are red, producing a regular pattern. The other walls are solely of red brick.

A cemetery survives behind the chapel, but it is not part of the conservation area; as of 2007, Lewes District Council were considering extending the area to include it.

== See also ==
- List of places of worship in Lewes (district)

== Bibliography ==
- Elleray, D. Robert (2004). Sussex Places of Worship. Worthing: Optimus Books. ISBN 0-9533132-7-1.
- Lindsey, Joyce (1983). Newick: The Story of a Sussex Village c. 900–1950. Newick: Newick Parish Council.
- Stell, Christopher (2002). Nonconformist Chapels and Meeting-houses in Eastern England. Swindon: English Heritage. ISBN 1-873592-50-7.
- Vickers, John A., ed. (1989). The Religious Census of Sussex 1851. Lewes: Sussex Record Society. ISBN 085445-036-X.
