= Ote Hall Chapel =

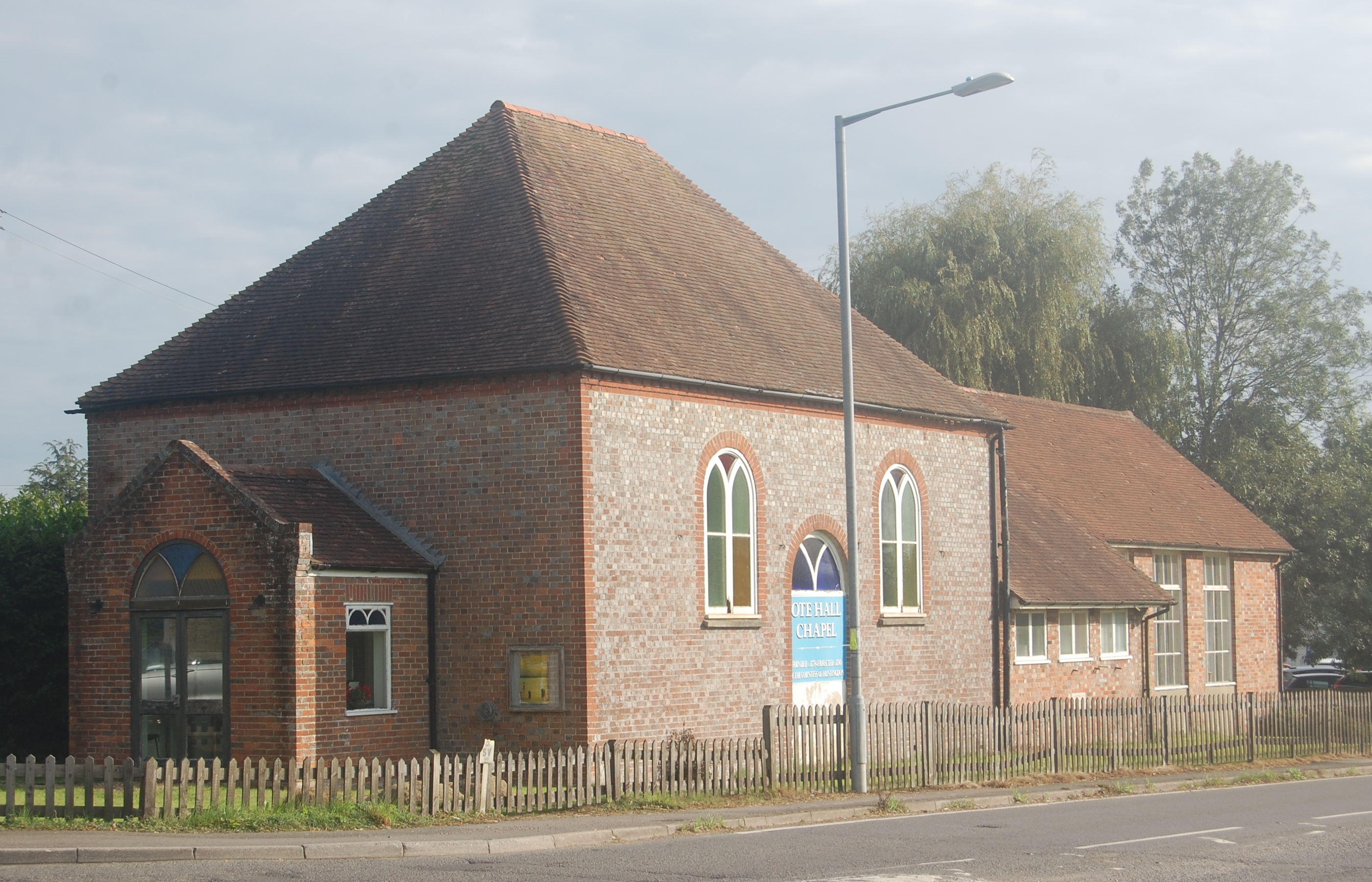
- The chapel from the northwest in 2021
- Ote Hall Chapel
- 50.9678°N 0.0907°W
- Location: Ditchling Road/Green Road, Wivelsfield, East Sussex RH17 7QB
- Country: England
- Denomination: Countess of Huntingdon's Connexion

History
- Former name: Ote Hall Congregational Church
- Status: Chapel
- Founded: 1778
- Founder: Selina Hastings, Countess of Huntingdon

Architecture
- Functional status: Active
- Heritage designation: Grade II
- Designated: 20 August 1965
- Completed: 1780

Clergy
- Pastor: Vacancy

Ote Hall Chapel is a place of worship belonging to the Countess of Huntingdon's Connexion—a small Nonconformist Christian denomination—in the village of Wivelsfield in East Sussex, England. The Connexion was established as a small group of Evangelical churches during the 18th-century Evangelical Revival by Selina Hastings, Countess of Huntingdon, and this chapel is one of the earliest: founded by the Countess herself in 1778 as a daughter church of the original chapel in Brighton, it has been in continuous use since 1780. Historic England has listed the building at Grade II for its architectural and historical importance.

== History ==
Selina Hastings, Countess of Huntingdon was born in 1707 and embraced the ideas of the then newly emerging Methodist movement. In the 1740s, she became influenced by the Calvinistic doctrines espoused by George Whitefield, who became her personal chaplain, and in the 1760s she founded a series of chapels, the first of which was in the grounds of the house in Brighton where she was living at the time. The Connexion which bears her name was formally established in 1783 and remains, Evangelical and "rigidly Calvinistic".

In 1763 the Countess moved a few miles north of Brighton to the village of Wivelsfield, where she took on the lease of Great Ote Hall, a small country house with 16th-century origins. In 1778 she started holding services there in a room which was converted into a chapel, and two years later she arranged for a purpose-built chapel to be constructed on a site about 1/4 mile (0.40 km) to the northeast. A manse was built on the south side around the same time. A Sunday school was started at the chapel in 1887.

In the early 20th century the chapel was administered as part of the Congregational Church. In 1907 it was reported that it was being operated as a branch of the Congregational chapel at Haywards Heath, and five years later the minister in charge of the Congregational chapel at Plumpton was said to be looking after Ote Hall Chapel. It was still described as Congregational in 1940.

Ote Hall Chapel was listed at Grade II by English Heritage on 20 August 1965. Such buildings are defined as "nationally important and of special interest". As of February 2001, it was one of 1,162 Grade II listed buildings and 1,250 listed buildings of all grades in the district of Lewes, the local government district in which Wivelsfield is located. It is the second oldest Countess of Huntingdon's Connexion chapel to survive in religious use: (Note: The Countess built a house and chapel in Bath in 1765; the chapel is still standing but passed out of religious use in the early 1980s. The Countess of Huntingdon's Connexion congregation which used it had declined by the early 20th century and decided to unite with a group of Presbyterians in 1922. The combined congregation joined the United Reformed Church upon the formation of that denomination in 1972 and moved to another chapel in 1981.) it was a daughter church of the Connexion's original chapel in Brighton, which opened in 1761 behind the house where the Countess was then living.

== Architecture ==
Ote Hall Chapel has been described as resembling "a small box". The walls of the chapel are of dark grey glazed bricks with some red-brick dressings. The façade, which faces west and is quite broad, has two arched windows with glazing bars. The original entrance, also arched, was set between these windows but is now blocked; a new entrance, set in a gabled porch, was built on the north side in the late 19th century. The back (east) wall also has two arched windows. The roof is hipped and laid with tiles; below it is a cornice supported on modillions. A manse, built around the same time as the chapel, originally adjoined at the south end, but in 1956 it was demolished and replaced with the present church hall.

== Administration ==
Ote Hall Chapel is registered for worship in accordance with the Places of Worship Registration Act 1855; its number on the register is 33050. It was registered for the solemnisation of marriages in accordance with the Marriage Act 1836 on 28 December 1891. As of 2026, it is one of 22 churches in England that are part of the Countess of Huntingdon's Connexion. The counties of East and West Sussex are the denomination's hotbed: other Connexion chapels in Sussex are at Bells Yew Green, Bolney, Copthorne, Eastbourne (South Street Free Church), Hailsham, Shoreham-by-Sea and Turners Hill.

There is a morning service every Sunday at 11.00am, and on two Sundays each month the chapel also holds an evening service.

== See also ==
- Media related to Wivelsfield Ote Hall Congregational Chapel at Wikimedia Commons
- List of places of worship in Lewes District

== Bibliography ==
- Antram, Nicholas; Pevsner, Nikolaus (2013). Sussex: East with Brighton and Hove. The Buildings of England. London: Yale University Press. ISBN 978-0-300-18473-0.
- Berry, Sue (2005). Georgian Brighton. Chichester: Phillimore & Co. Ltd. ISBN 1-86077-342-7.
- Elleray, D. Robert (2004). Sussex Places of Worship. Worthing: Optimus Books. ISBN 0-9533132-7-1.
- Stell, Christopher (1991). Nonconformist Chapels and Meeting-houses in South-West England. Swindon: English Heritage. ISBN 0-11-300036-7.
- Stell, Christopher (2002). Nonconformist Chapels and Meeting-houses in Eastern England. Swindon: English Heritage. ISBN 1-873592-50-7.
