= Southover General Baptist Chapel =

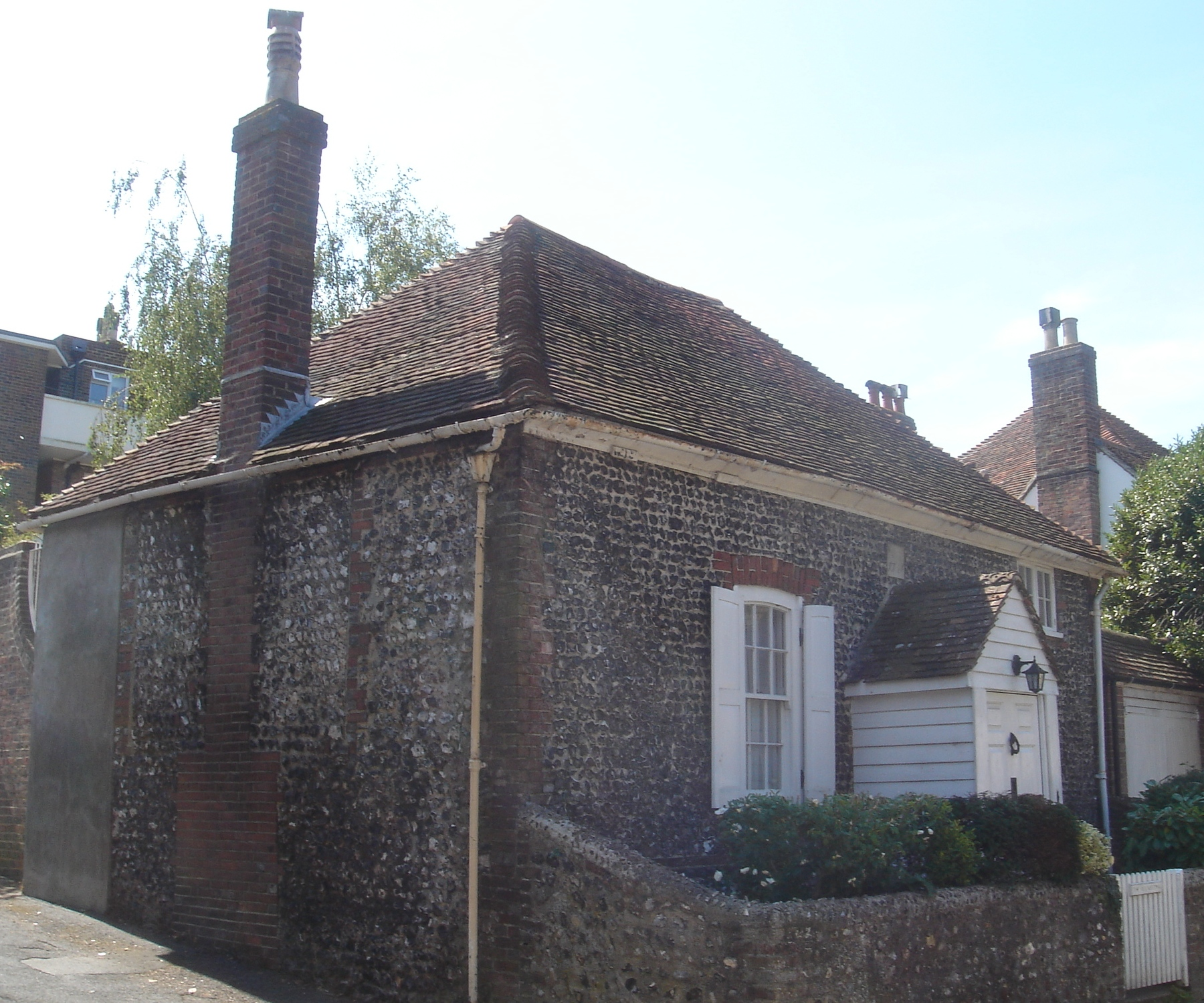
- The former chapel from the northeast
- Southover General Baptist Chapel
- 50.8700°N 0.0082°E
- Location: Eastport Lane, Southover, Lewes, East Sussex BN7 1TL
- Country: England
- Denomination: Baptist

History
- Status: Former chapel
- Founded: 1741

Architecture
- Functional status: Residential conversion
- Heritage designation: Grade II
- Designated: 29 October 1985
- Style: Vernacular
- Completed: 1741
- Closed: 1972

Southover General Baptist Chapel is a former Baptist place of worship in the ancient village of Southover, now part of the town and district of Lewes, one of six local government districts in the English county of East Sussex. Founded in 1741 as the first Baptist place of worship in the area, it attracted a congregation of General Baptists whose theological views gradually moved towards Unitarianism. This led to their union with the members of the nearby Westgate Chapel, after which the flint and brick building housed other congregations and secular groups before its conversion to a house. The building is protected as a Grade II by English Heritage.

== History ==
Lewes is an ancient borough and market town on the River Ouse. The adjacent village of Southover, now part of the town, was chosen by William de Warenne, 1st Earl of Surrey in the 11th century as the site for his Cluniac Priory dedicated to St Pancras. The area went on to develop a strong Protestant Nonconformist tradition in the 18th and 19th centuries: denominations such as the Countess of Huntingdon's Connexion, Unitarianism, Methodism, Quakers, Baptists, Strict Baptists, Presbyterianism and Congregationalism were all represented. The General Baptist Chapel, the first Baptist place of worship in the area, was founded at Southover in 1741, possibly by a group associated with an earlier church (now Unitarian) at nearby Ditchling. Another Baptist congregation, this time consisting of Particular Baptists, started worshipping in Lewes in 1784; they moved to Eastgate Chapel in 1843.

In the 19th century, most General Baptist congregations in Sussex gradually adopted Unitarian views, following the lead of Matthew Caffyn who was influential at the General Baptist chapel (now Unitarian) in Horsham. The members of the Southover chapel were no exception, and in 1825 they decided to unite with the congregation of Westgate Chapel, a Unitarian meeting house founded in Lewes town centre in 1695. The chapel became a meeting house used by other religious groups, including for a time The Salvation Army. Secular groups also used it, but in 1972 it was sold and converted into a cottage. It was altered inside, and the burial ground at the rear was covered with concrete (although some headstones were dug up and preserved).

Southover General Baptist Chapel—under its new name of The Old Meeting—was listed at Grade II by English Heritage on 29 October 1985.

== Architecture ==
The single-storey chapel faces north and is built of knapped flint in the Vernacular style. There are quoins and dressings of red brick. The hipped roof is tiled. A modern porch with weatherboarding and a gable covers the original entrance door, above which is a stone marked The First Stone Laid May Ye 14 1741. Flanking the porch are two shallow-arched sash windows which have lost their original wooden shutters. There is also a small casement window at the top right. The rear (south) wall has two similar arched windows and a doorway which is not original. There are chimney-stacks on the west and east walls, both of which are later additions. That on the east wall is flanked by the outline of two original windows.

The chapel's interior dimensions were 27.25 by 17.75 feet (8.31 m × 5.41 m). All 18th-century features, including a gallery, have been stripped out, but two old (possibly early 19th-century) fireplaces remain. A series of bricks in the south wall, laid out in a square, are inscribed with various initials and the date 1741.

== See also ==
- Media related to Southover General Baptist Chapel at Wikimedia Commons
- List of places of worship in Lewes District

== Bibliography ==
- Elleray, D. Robert (2004). Sussex Places of Worship. Worthing: Optimus Books. ISBN 0-9533132-7-1.
- Stell, Christopher (2002). Nonconformist Chapels and Meeting-houses in Eastern England. Swindon: English Heritage. ISBN 1-873592-50-7.
