= St Anne's Church, Lewes =

Church in East Sussex, England

St Anne's Church
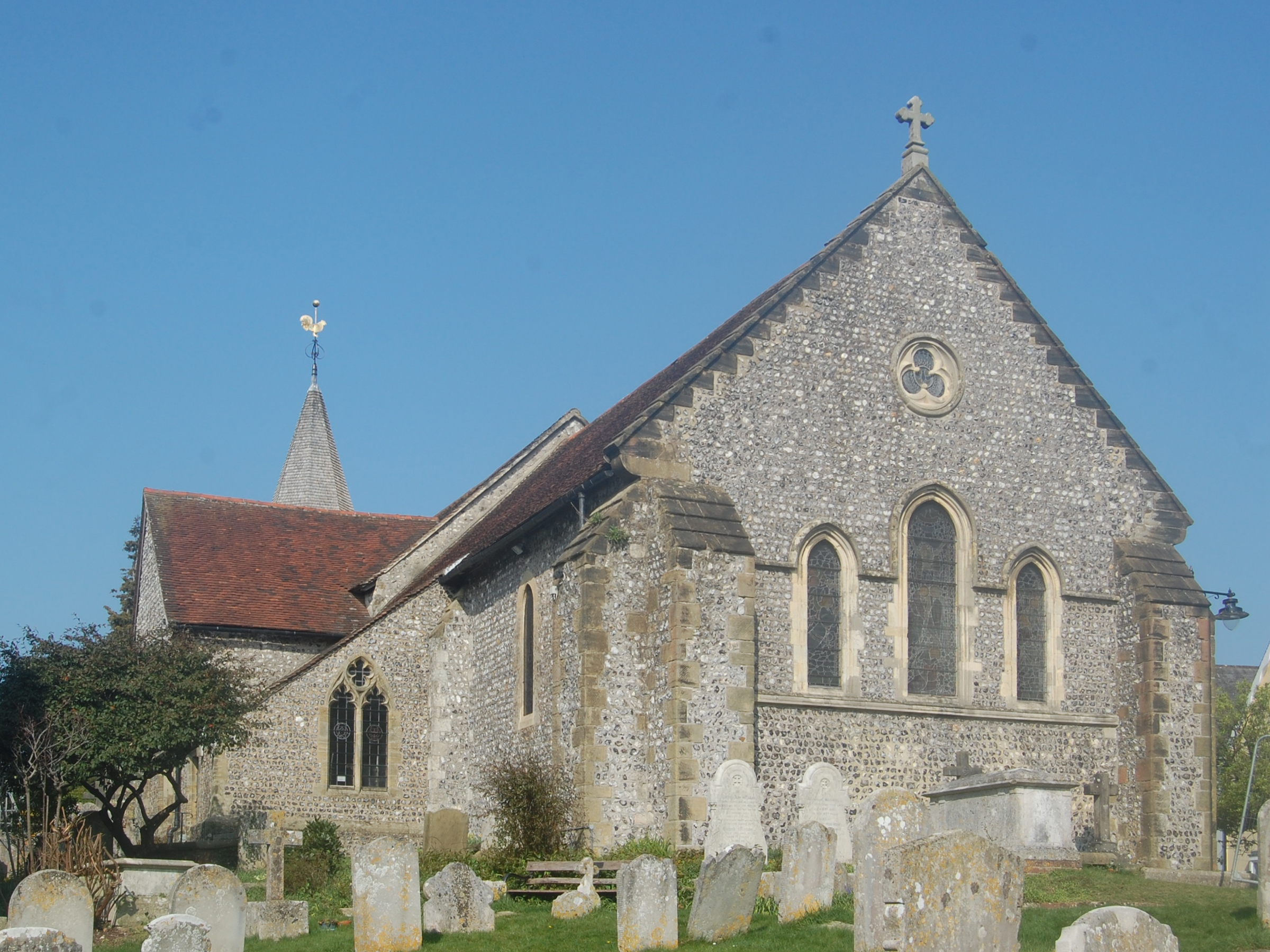
- The church from the southeast in 2022

- Location in East Sussex
- 50°52′21″N 0°00′06″E
- Location: Lewes, East Sussex
- Country: England
- Denomination: Church of England
- Website: www.stanneslewes.org.uk

History
- Former name: St Mary Westout Church
- Status: Parish church
- Founded: Before 1095
- Dedication: Saint Anne

Architecture
- Functional status: Active
- Style: Norman

Listed Building – Grade I
- Official name: Church of St Anne
- Designated: 25 February 1952
- Reference no.: 1043687

St Anne's Church (originally known as St Mary Westout) is a Church of England parish church in Lewes, the county town of East Sussex, England. One of several ancient churches surviving in the town, it retains fabric from the Norman era despite a restoration in 1889, and is the only church in the town in which a substantial amount of Norman work survives. The church is built of flint and stone with a roof of Horsham Stone tiles, and has a chancel, aisled nave and west tower with a short spire. It is listed at Grade I for its architectural and historical importance.

The church was in existence by the 11th century. Until the 16th century it was dedicated to Mary and bore the name St Mary Westout, in reference to its position in the Westout borough within the Hundred of Swanborough, immediately west of Lewes. By the same century another nearby church, St Peter Westout, was ruinous, and St Anne's (a dedication which gradually superseded the original) absorbed its parish. Various rounds of rebuilding, restoration and extension to the ancient building took place in 1889, 1927 (when evidence of an anchorite's cell was uncovered) and 2024.

== History ==
From 1296 or earlier, Westout was a division of the Hundred of Swanborough, a division of land west of the ancient borough of Lewes. It was the closest to Lewes of the three parts (known as boroughs) of the Hundred, lying just outside the town's West Gate. (Note: A boundary stone marking the western limit of the borough of Lewes was recorded in 1622 as being "at the east end of the chancel" of the church. The borough boundary was extended in 1881, and St Anne's Church and parish are now wholly within Lewes town.) It had two parish churches, St Peter's and St Mary's (also known as St Peter Westout and St Mary Westout), both of which were in existence by 1095 when William de Warenne, 2nd Earl of Surrey, presented them to Lewes Priory (St Pancras Priory).

In the late 12th century, an aisle and side chapel were formed on the south side of the nave by cutting a four-bay arcade into the south wall and extending the east end to form a vaulted, transept-like space with arched entrances to both the aisle and the nave. The vaulting in the chapel is characteristic of architecture of this era and follows similar developments at cathedrals and major parish churches—in this case, Chichester Cathedral. Other contemporary Sussex churches to feature vaulted chapels include St Mary the Virgin at Aldingbourne, St Mary the Blessed Virgin at Sompting and St Mary the Virgin at Burpham.

St Peter's Church was in ruins by the 1530s. In 1538 its parish was united with that of St Mary's Church, and the parish was initially known as St Peter and St Mary Westout. The dedication to St Anne was first recorded in that year, though, and by 1622 "the church [was] called St Mary Westout alias St Anne's".

The aisle was originally of four bays, but by the 16th century the westernmost bay was ruinous and was walled up.

When the vestry was built in 1927, an anchorite's cell was uncovered. Part of its squint survives in the south wall of the chancel. This anchorite is known to have been female (an anchoress) and was left money in the will of Richard of Chichester, who died in 1253, but her name is unknown. Anchorites were prevalent in Sussex churches in the 13th century, and Richard of Chichester made bequests to several. Other churches known to have had anchorites include Chichester Cathedral, Findon, Hardham, Houghton, Pagham, Stedham, Steyning, Stopham, St John sub Castro in Lewes, and St Julian's Church, Kingston Buci, where much of the original structure (including the roofline) survive. The work in 1927 also involved repairing the westernmost bay of the south aisle and unblocking the corresponding arch of the arcade, for the first time since the 16th century.

In 2024, an extension was built between the south wall of the tower and the end of the south aisle to provide kitchen and lavatory facilities. The work, by Paramount Architecture of Eastbourne, was highly commended in Sussex Heritage Trust's 2024 Ecclesiastical Awards; the trust described the design as "purposely contemporary in detail but sensitive to traditional materials."

In the churchyard, a tombstone close to the lychgate records the burial of "Little Benjamin the Ruler", who was 89 when he died in 1747. Nobody knows who he was, and he is not recorded in the parish register. The church's website states that "the most persuasive theory" is that it may be the grave of Benjamin Ellis, an early-18th-century churchwarden at St Anne's, although he may have been born in 1663. The reference to "Little Benjamin" may relate to Psalm 68, in which verse 27 states "There is little Benjamin with their ruler, the princes of Judah and their council, the princes of Zebulun, and the princes of Naphtali".

== Architecture ==
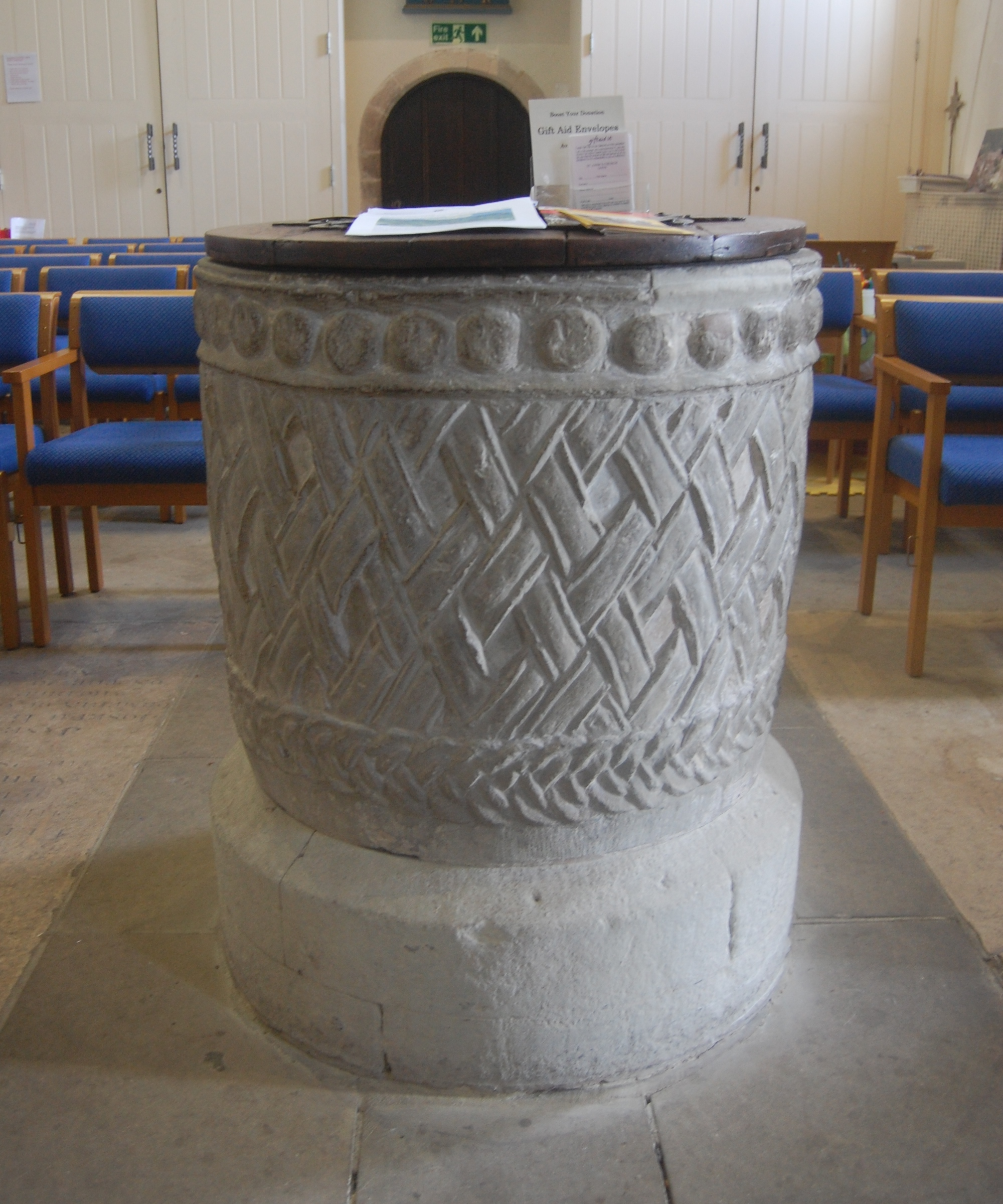
The 12th-century baptismal font

St Anne's is "the only church in Lewes with substantial Norman work", although this is only apparent inside because the exterior has been "grossly over-restored". At the west (Note: All directions here are liturgical directions. The physical orientation of the church is slightly skewed from the west–east alignment, with the tower being slightly north of west.) end there is a tower, topped with a broach spire and with a reset Norman arch in the west wall; then the nave, flanked by a south aisle and connected to the tower by an arched doorway; then a rebuilt chancel arch leading to the chancel, which has no aisles. Between the chancel arch and the east end of the south aisle is a side chapel, and attached to this is a vestry. The entrance is through a "much restored" porch on the north side. The internal dimensions of the nave are 66 by 21 1/2 feet (20.1 m × 6.6 m); of the chancel, 41 1/2 by 21 feet (12.6 m × 6.4 m); and of the tower, 11 by 10 feet (3.4 m × 3.0 m). The church has flint walls dressed with stone; the roofs are tiled, partly with Horsham Stone; and the spire is shingled. An original 12th-century doorway has been inserted in the porch. The chancel has three lancet windows on the north side and two in the south wall, and the east window is a tripartite lancet. There is some stained glass, including one window by Jean-Baptiste Capronnier in the south transept, dating from the 1889 remodelling.

The work carried out on the south arcade and aisle is an example of the Transitional style between late Norman and early Gothic architecture. It is almost identical in style and timeframe to that at nearby St Peter's Church, Rodmell, albeit "a grander version" of it. Rodmell church was also owned by Lewes Priory, and it is considered almost certain that the same designer was responsible for both remodellings and that he was a member of the priory. The arches are pointed, slightly chamfered and separated by round pillars with "stepped" abaci. The capitals are decorated with carved trefoils, all with different patterns: some "stiff and upright" and others "sharply cut and sinuously curving". In contrast to the tall pointed arches of the arcade, the side chapel has lower round-arched openings to the nave and the aisle. Several remnants of the anchorite's cell survive on the south side: a hatch leading into it, a seat, two recesses (one of which has the hagioscope or squint, which allowed the anchorite to see into the church) and the grave of the anchorite.

Interior fittings include a stone baptismal font of the "tub" type, dating from the 12th century and featuring ornate patterns; an octagonal pulpit of oak, presented to the church in 1620; and a processional cross reputed to be of Abyssinian origin. Numerous memorials and monuments from the 17th and 18th centuries survive inside. Some older memorials may have been transferred from St Peter Westout Church. These include a brass memorial to Thomas Twyne (d. 1613), a "remarkable man" who combined his profession as a doctor with writing (including "a survey of the world") and analysis of earthquakes. Thomas Walker Horsfield provided a famous translation of the "florid Latin inscription" on the memorial. The tower has three bells. One is 15th-century, and the other two bear the date 1683 and the name of the founder, William Hull.

== Advowson ==
The advowson (the right to present a nominee for the church living, i.e. a rector) was held by Lewes Priory until 1537, when it passed in quick succession to Thomas Cromwell and (by 1551) The Crown. The Victoria County History of Sussex (1940) recorded that it had subsequently been held by the Lord Chancellor.

== The church today ==
The church was listed at Grade I on 25 February 1952. Such buildings are defined as being of "exceptional interest" and greater than national importance. As of February 2001, it was one of 31 Grade I listed buildings, and 1,250 listed buildings of all grades, in the district of Lewes. Since 1975 the parish has been part of a united benefice with St Michael's Church and St Thomas a Becket's Church (Note: Formally, the parish of St Thomas a Becket and All Saints. The former All Saints Church on Friars Walk was declared redundant in 1975.) at Cliffe. There are two Sunday morning services and a monthly Evensong on summer Sunday evenings. Prayer services take place on weekday mornings (Monday to Wednesday) and Thursday evenings.

== See also ==
- Grade I listed buildings in East Sussex
- List of places of worship in Lewes District
- Media related to Lewes St Anne's Church at Wikimedia Commons

== Bibliography ==
- Antram, Nicholas; Pevsner, Nikolaus (2013). Sussex: East with Brighton and Hove. The Buildings of England. London: Yale University Press. ISBN 978-0-300-18473-0.
- Arscott, David (1991). Curiosities of East Sussex: a County Guide to the Unusual. Market Drayton: S.B. Publications. ISBN 1-870708-87-3.
- Collins, Sophie (2007). A Sussex Miscellany. Alfriston: Snake River Press. ISBN 978-1-906022-08-2.
- Lucas, E.V. (1928) [1904]. The Highways and Byways of Sussex (2nd ed.). London: MacMillan & Co.
- Roberts, Richard (1988). Twelfth Century Church Architecture in Sussex. Lewes: The Book Guild Ltd. ISBN 0-86332-277-8.
- Vigar, John E. (1986). Exploring Sussex Churches. Rainham: Meresborough Books. ISBN 0-948193-09-3.
- Whiteman, Ken; Whiteman, Joyce (1994). Ancient Churches of Sussex. Seaford: S.B. Publications. ISBN 1-85770-154-2.
