= Countess of Huntingdon's Connexion =

Christian denomination, 1783-

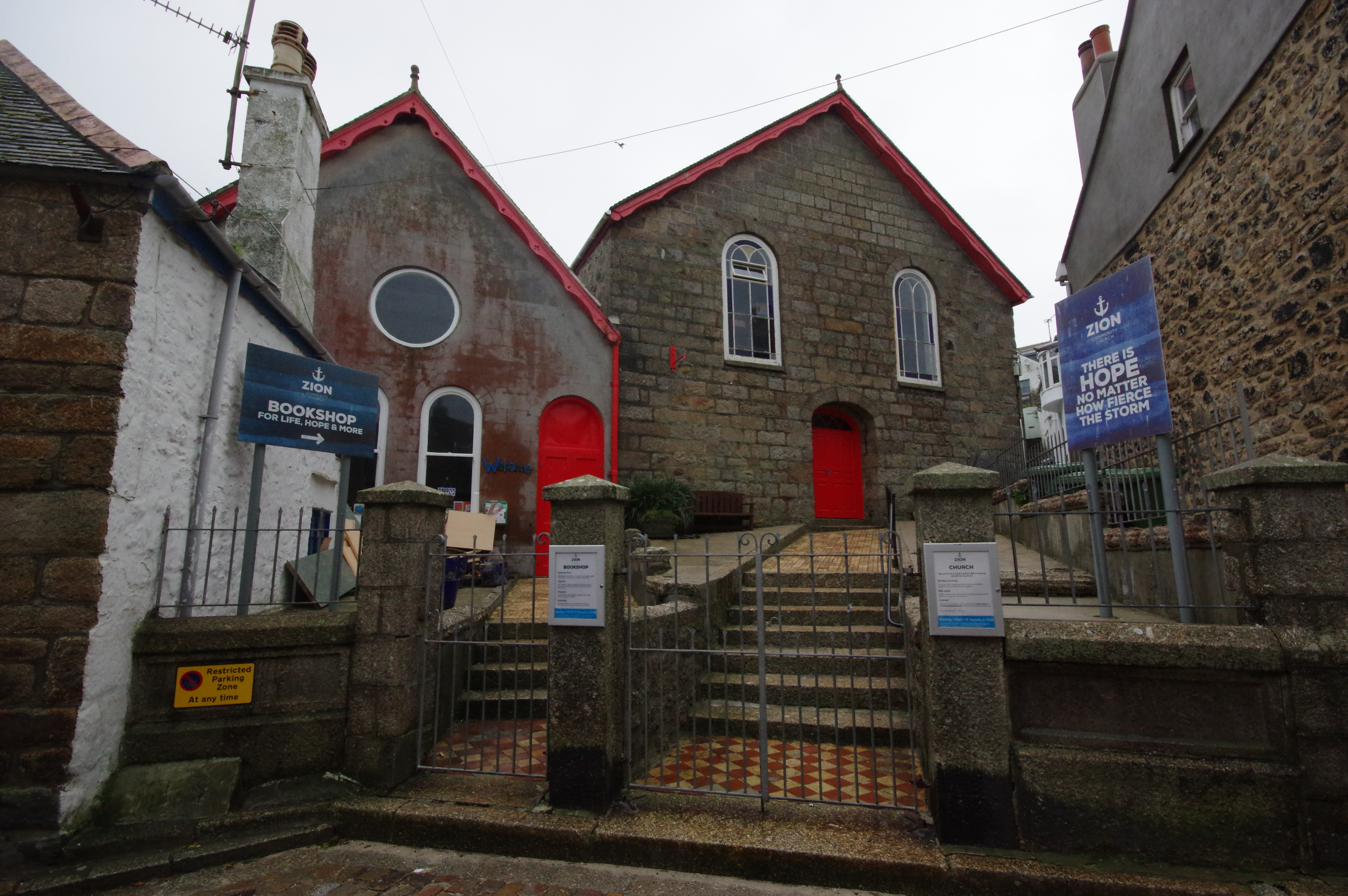
- A congregation of the Countess of Huntingdon's Connexion in Cornwall
- Classification: Calvinistic Methodism
- Orientation: Evangelical
- Polity: Connexionalism
- Origin: 1783
- Congregations: 50+

The Countess of Huntingdon's Connexion, often abbreviated to The Connexion, is a society of evangelical churches in the Calvinistic Methodist tradition, founded in 1783 by Selina Hastings, Countess of Huntingdon, as a result of the Evangelical Revival. From its early days, it was strongly associated with the Reformed Methodist movement of George Whitefield.

== History ==
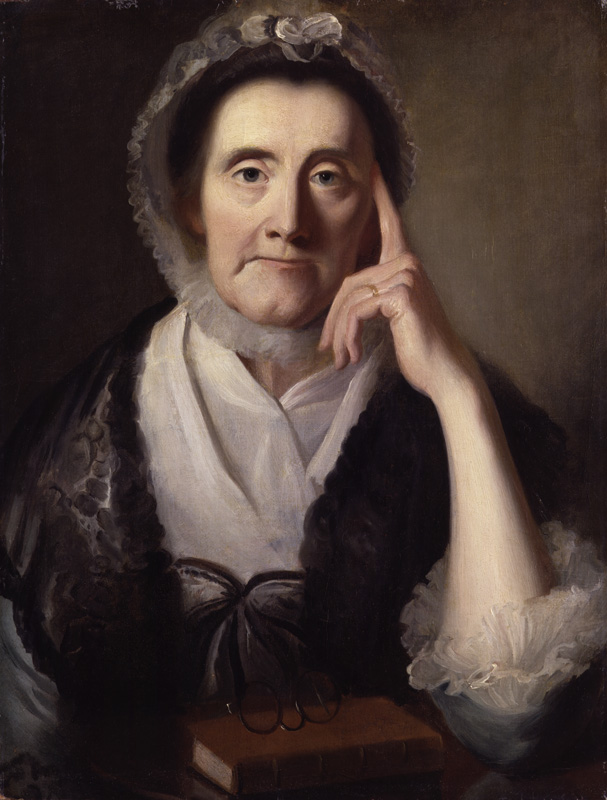
Selina Hastings, Countess of Huntingdon, c. 1770 (unidentified artist)

The Countess of Huntingdon's Connexion was founded in 1783 by Selina Hastings, Countess of Huntingdon, as a result of the Evangelical Revival. It seceded from the Church of England, founded its own training establishment – Trevecca College – and built up a network of chapels across England in the late 18th century.

In 1785 John Marrant (1755–1791), an African American from New York and the South who settled in London after the American Revolutionary War, became ordained as a minister with the connexion. He was supported in travel to Nova Scotia as a missionary to minister to the Black Loyalists who had been resettled there by the Crown. Many of the members of the congregation which he organized in Birchtown, Nova Scotia later chose to emigrate and resettle in Sierra Leone, the new British colony in West Africa. What was called a Province of Freedom was founded in 1792. Additional Connexion churches were founded in Sierra Leone (see below), and the British and Sierra Leone movements re-established contact in 1839.

The connexion had earlier efforts at congregation building in Canada. In the 1850s, the entrepreneur Thomas Molson built a church for the connexion near his brewery in Montreal. It was poorly attended as the city's population was predominantly Catholic. The building was adapted for use as a military barracks.

The Countess of Huntingdon's gave strong support to the Calvinistic Methodist movement in Wales in the 18th and early 19th centuries, including the foundation of a theological college at Trefeca (Trevecca) in 1760.

== Churches ==
=== Active ===
As of 2019 the connexion has 22 congregations in England and "more than 30" in Sierra Leone. A UK-registered charity provides financial help with ministers' wages and training and for Connexion schools and teaching salaries in the latter country.

Of the UK churches, seven normally have full-time pastors: Eastbourne, Ely, Goring, Rosedale, St. Ives, Turners Hill and Ebley. Total regular attendance at all churches is approximately 1,000 adults and children.

Church	Location	Founded	Link	Minister
Bells Yew Green Chapel	Bells Yew Green, Kent			
Bolney Village Chapel	Bolney, West Sussex			Simon Allaby
Broad Oak Chapel	Broad Oak, Kent	1867		
Copthorne Chapel	Copthorne, West Sussex	1822		
Cradley Chapel	Cradley, Herefordshire	1823		Ken Hart
South Street Free Church	Eastbourne, East Sussex	1897		David Batchelor
Ebley Chapel	Ebley, Stroud, Gloucestershire			
Countess Free Church, Ely	Ely, Cambridgeshire	1785		Satyajit (Sat) Deodhar
New Connexions Free Church, Ely	Ely, Cambridgeshire			Keith Waters
Goring Free Church	Goring-on-Thames, Oxfordshire	1788		Nigel Gordon-Potts
Hailsham Gospel Mission	Hailsham East Sussex			
St Stephen's Church, Middleton	Middleton, Greater Manchester			
Mortimer West End Chapel	Mortimer West End, Hampshire			
Rosedale Community Church	Cheshunt, Hertfordshire			Bethany Green
Sheppey Evangelical Church	Leysdown-on-Sea, Kent			Joe Gregory
Shoreham Free Church	Shoreham-by-Sea, West Sussex			Peter Earle
Slough Community Church	Slough, Berkshire			
Zion Community Church St Ives	St Ives, Cornwall			Tim Dennick
Turners Hill Free Church	Turners Hill, West Sussex			Geoff Chapman
Ote Hall Chapel	Wivelsfield, East Sussex			
Woodmancote Evangelical Free Church	Woodmancote, Gloucestershire			Andrew Hiscock
Wormley Free Church	Wormley, Hertfordshire	1834		Ben Quant

=== Earlier churches ===
Connexion churches were formerly active in:

- Bath, Somerset: founded in 1765, later Trinity United Reformed Church and now the Museum of Bath Architecture
- Bodmin, Cornwall: in January 1880 the congregation bought the "very desirable" property known as Springfield for a minister's residence.
- Brighton, East Sussex, the first of the churches, was founded at North Street in 1761.
- East Grinstead, West Sussex: Zion Chapel founded in 1810, now the West Street Baptist Church
- Cheltenham, Gloucestershire Portland Chapel, North Place was built at the expense of Robert Capper in 1816 for a Connexion congregation. It was later joined by and then merged with a Baptist Congregation from Golden Valley, Cheltenham.
- Fordham, Essex was active in the 19th century.
- Preston, Lancashire, founded before 1826, in Pole Street, is now closed.
- South Stoke, Oxfordshire, founded in 1820, is now a private house.
- Steyning, West Sussex: Jarvis Hall, a Connexion church from 1835 to 1841
- St John's Free Church, Westcott, Surrey remains as a community centre.
- Tyldesley, Greater Manchester, founded in 1789, known as Tyldesley Top Chapel, now belongs to a Pentecostal congregation.
- Worcester, Worcestershire had closed as a chapel by 1970. It is now a concert hall known as Huntingdon Hall.
- York Street, Dublin, built in 1808
