= Brighton and Hove National Spiritualist Church =

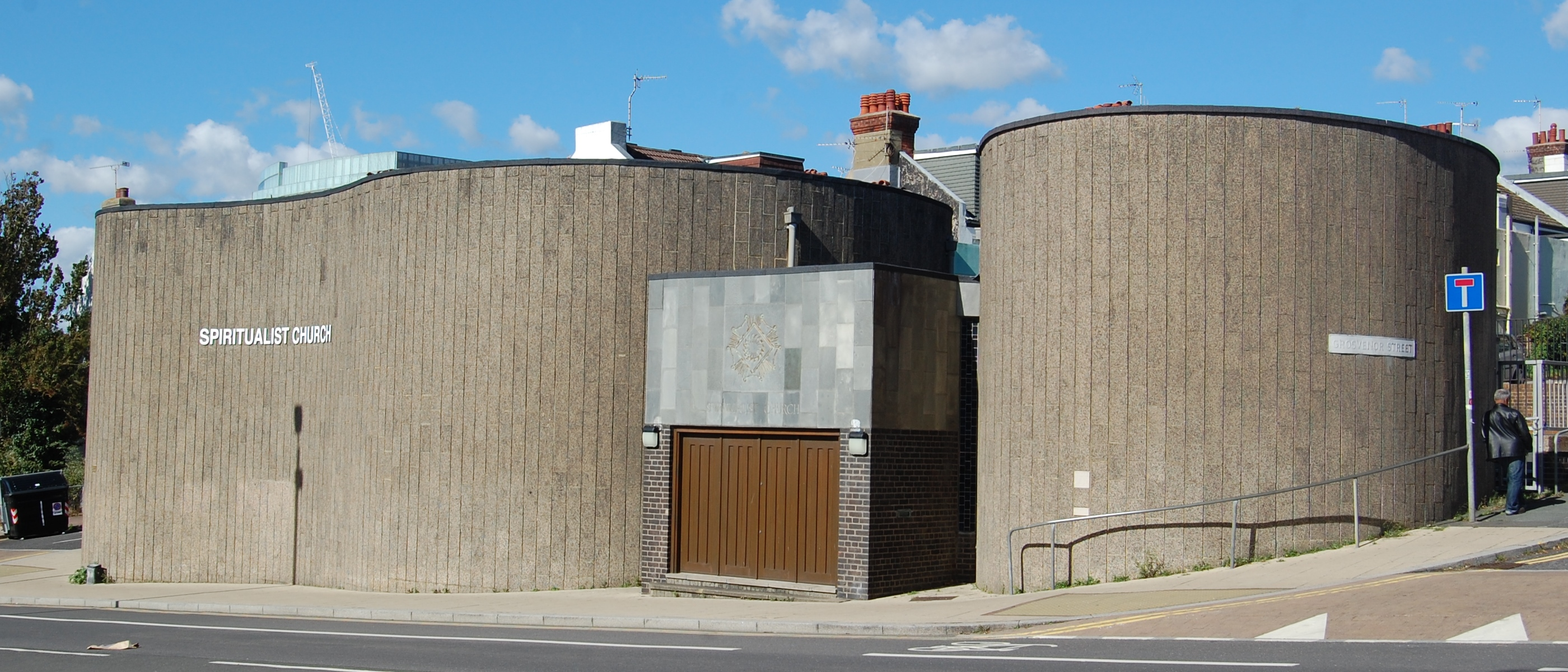
- The church from the southeast
- Brighton and Hove National Spiritualist Church
- 50.8223°N 0.1313°W
- Location: Edward Street, Carlton Hill, Brighton BN2 0JR
- Country: England
- Denomination: Spiritualist
- Website: www.brightonnationalspiritualistchurch.com/index.html

History
- Former name: Brighton National Spiritualist Church
- Status: Church
- Founded: 17 May 1902
- Events: 17 May 1965: present church registered 23 November 2019: amalgamated with Brighton and Hove Central Spiritualist Church

Architecture
- Functional status: Active
- Heritage designation: Locally listed
- Designated: 2015
- Architect(s): Bev Pike (Overton & Partners)
- Architectural type: Church
- Style: Brutalist
- Years built: 1964–65
- Completed: 1965

Brighton and Hove National Spiritualist Church, known until 2019 as Brighton National Spiritualist Church, is a Spiritualist place of worship in the Carlton Hill area of Brighton, part of the English seaside city of Brighton and Hove. Since its amalgamation with another church in the city in November 2019, it has been one of England's largest Spiritualist churches.

The church was formed in 1902 and has occupied various premises since then. The present building, which has been registered as a place of worship since 1965, is architecturally significant for its curved, windowless Brutalist form. It has been recognised as a locally listed heritage asset by Brighton and Hove City Council.

== History ==
Brighton's first Spiritualist church was formally founded on 17 May 1902, when a committee of worshippers agreed to hold weekly services in "the room [in] which the meeting had been formerly held". The first president was elected at the same time. The use of rented rooms and premises ceased in 1921 when a former Baptist chapel came on the market. This was on the corner of Mighell Street and Carlton Hill in the Carlton Hill district, east of central Brighton. It was built in 1878 for Strict Baptists and was founded by Thomas Boxall and George Virgo, two Strict Baptist ministers. The former led the church until 1893, when Virgo—who was in also charge of Bethel Chapel in Wivelsfield—took over. The chapel fell out of use in 1910 and was subsequently used as the church hall for the nearby St John the Evangelist's Church. The committee of Spiritualist worshippers purchased the building for £1,250. With the name Brighton National Spiritualist Church, it was formally registered as a place of worship and for the solemnisation of marriages in January 1949.

The Carlton Hill area, bounded on the southern edge by the narrow Edward Street, was one of Brighton's worst slum areas by the 1950s. "The face of the street was completely altered" by the clearance of unsuitable buildings in the 1950s and a programme of road widening between 1961 and 1964 on what was the main entry point to the town from the east. Many properties were compulsorily purchased, including the church on Mighell Street (whose site was occupied from 1977 by forecourt of Amex House, a corporate headquarters). In March 1961, shortly after the compulsory purchase order, the church was able to acquire a new site further along Edward Street. Work began on the present church building in 1964 and was completed the following year, and on 17 May 1965 the new Brighton National Spiritualist Church was registered in place of its predecessor. It was licensed for marriages six weeks later. Following the passing of the Marriage (Same Sex Couples) Act 2013, the church was also registered for the solemnisation of same-sex marriages in July 2014.

The church was reconstituted with effect from 23 November 2019, becoming Brighton and Hove National Spiritualist Church. On that date it merged with another Spiritualist church in the city which had given up its premises. The Brighton and Hove Central Spiritualist Church was first documented in April 1925, when it met at the Athenaeum Hall in North Street. This had been built in 1890 as a 500-capacity multi-purpose recreational and leisure hall; as well as having various secular uses, it was also the first home of the First Church of Christ, Scientist, Brighton until it moved to the Montpelier district of Brighton in 1921. Spiritualists used the hall until it was compulsorily purchased in 1962 for road widening and the construction of an office block. The congregation, which had been affiliated with the Spiritualists' National Union since 1941, shared the premises of Brotherhood Gate Church (another Spiritualist place of worship in Brighton) until 1965. In July 1966 they registered part of a building on Norfolk Terrace in the Montpelier area as a new place of worship; this was succeeded in 1978 by their new premises, a house and former brothel on Boundary Passage (an alleyway running along the ancient boundary between Brighton and Hove parishes). The new church was dedicated in December 1978 and formally registered in July 1984. It held its last service prior to the amalgamation on 4 November 2019.

Brighton and Hove National Spiritualist Church describes itself as "one of the largest Spiritualist churches in the country." Two Sunday services are held, and there are other sessions and demonstrations on all days except Tuesdays. It is affiliated with the Spiritualists' National Union.

== Architecture ==
The firm of Overton & Partners were commissioned in 1964 to design the new church. They were later involved in the initial design scheme for Brighton Marina. The scheme architect was Bev Pike.

The northern side of Edward Street dates entirely from the 1960s and 1970s and is lined with "prominent buildings" such as the church, which has an "unusual figure-of-eight design". The building is in two parts linked by an offset flat-roofed entrance bay. The longer left-hand section is oblong inside but with a "sinuous" kidney-shaped exterior. To the right is a smaller circular- or oval-shaped worship space lit by a round roof lantern. The left-hand worship space is also top-lit with square shafts; the exterior is entirely windowless, consisting of vertically laid concrete blocks in a pattern emulating stretcher bond brickwork. The softening effect of the curved exterior walls provides a contrast to their "starkly unperforated" mass; the "smooth angular entrance building" is also a contrast. The interior worship space is lined with brickwork.

Brighton and Hove City Council placed the church on their Local List of Heritage Assets in 2015, describing it as a "good example of a modern design of place of worship", "contribut[ing] positively to the streetscene" and having a "largely unaltered" exterior.

== See also ==
- List of places of worship in Brighton and Hove

== Bibliography ==
- Antram, Nicholas; Pevsner, Nikolaus (2013). Sussex: East with Brighton and Hove. The Buildings of England. London: Yale University Press. ISBN 978-0-300-18473-0.
- Chambers, Ralph (1953). The Strict Baptist Chapels of England: Sussex. Vol. 2. Thornton Heath: Ralph Chambers.
- Collis, Rose (2010). The New Encyclopaedia of Brighton. (based on the original by Tim Carder) (1st ed.). Brighton: Brighton & Hove Libraries. ISBN 978-0-9564664-0-2.
