= Bethel Strict Baptist Chapel, Wivelsfield =

Bethel Baptist Chapel
- Bethel Strict Baptist Chapel
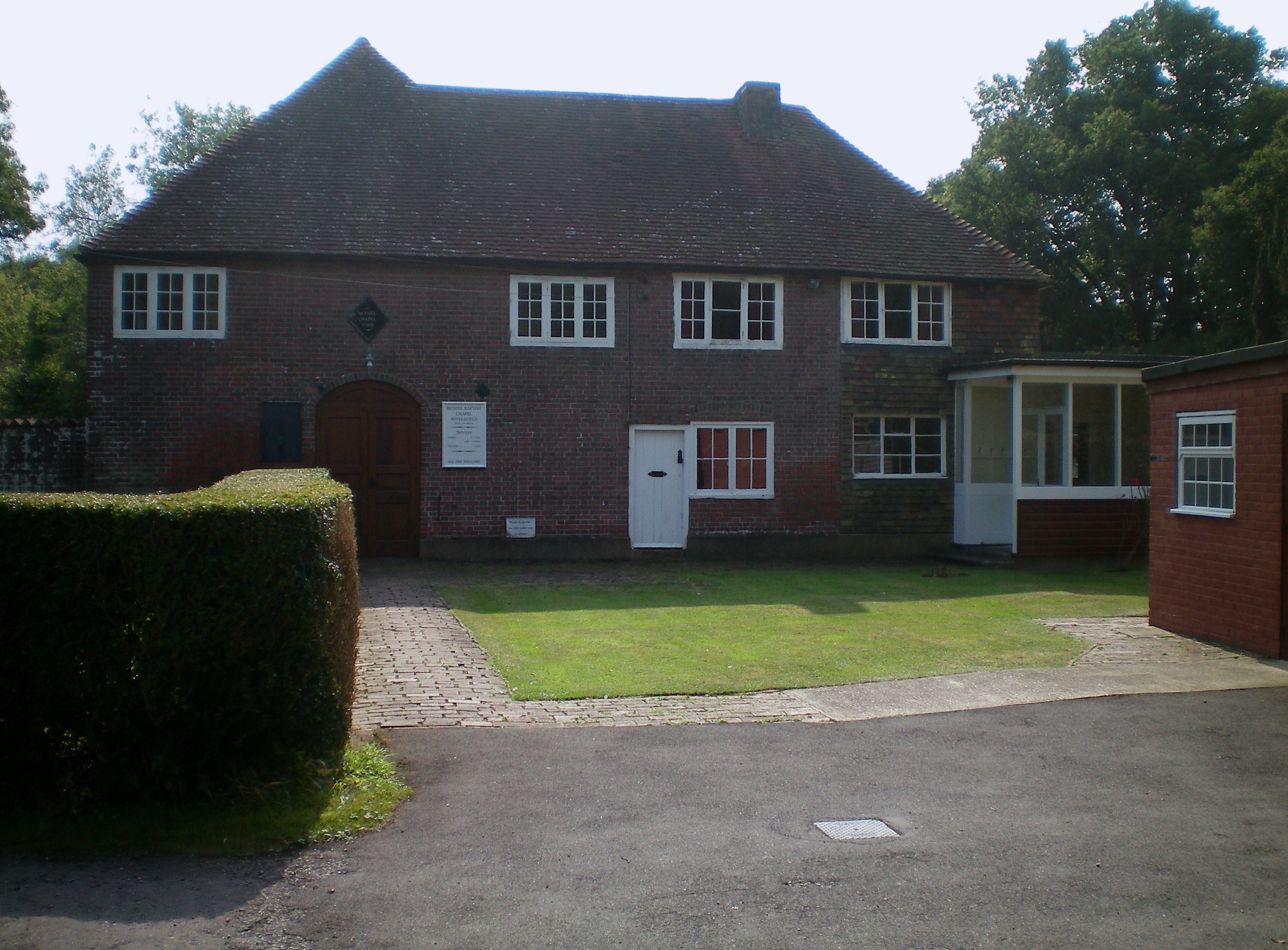
- The chapel from the north

- Location of the church within East Sussex
- 50.9627°N 0.0952°W
- OS grid reference: TQ 33856 19871
- Location: Ditchling Road, Wivelsfield, East Sussex RH15 0SJ
- Country: England
- Denomination: Baptist
- Churchmanship: Strict Baptist

History
- Former name: Wivelsfield Baptist Meeting House
- Status: Chapel
- Founded: 1763
- Founder: Henry Booker

Architecture
- Functional status: Active
- Heritage designation: Grade II
- Designated: 3 February 1977
- Style: Vernacular
- Groundbreaking: 1780
- Completed: 1780

Bethel Baptist Chapel is a Strict Baptist place of worship in the village of Wivelsfield in East Sussex, England. The cause was founded in 1763 by members of a chapel at nearby Ditchling; Henry Booker and other worshippers seceded and began to meet at Wivelsfield after hearing a sermon by George Whitefield. Although some members of the new church soon returned to the Ditchling congregation, the cause thrived under Booker's leadership, and the present chapel—a building of "quiet and unassuming elegance" set in its own graveyard—was erected in 1780. It has served the Strict Baptist community continuously since then, and members founded other chapels elsewhere in Sussex during the 18th and 19th centuries. The chapel is a Grade II Listed building.

== History ==
Throughout Sussex, a coastal county in southeast England, many Christian denominations have thrived alongside the Established Church of England since the 17th century, when the Act of Uniformity 1662 extended religious freedom to so-called Nonconformists or Dissenters (people and ministers who worshipped outside the Church of England but were not part of the Roman Catholic Church). The area around Lewes, the present county town of East Sussex, was a hotbed of Nonconformist worship, and Baptists of all types were well represented.

Ditchling, a village near Lewes, also supported several chapels in addition to the Anglican parish church, whose vicar said in 1780 that "this place is noted for Dissenters of almost all denominations". A General Baptist chapel was founded there in the 1730s, and served worshippers from villages across central Sussex and beyond. The son of Matthew Caffyn was associated with the chapel, as was William Evershed, who later founded the General Baptist Chapel at Billingshurst.

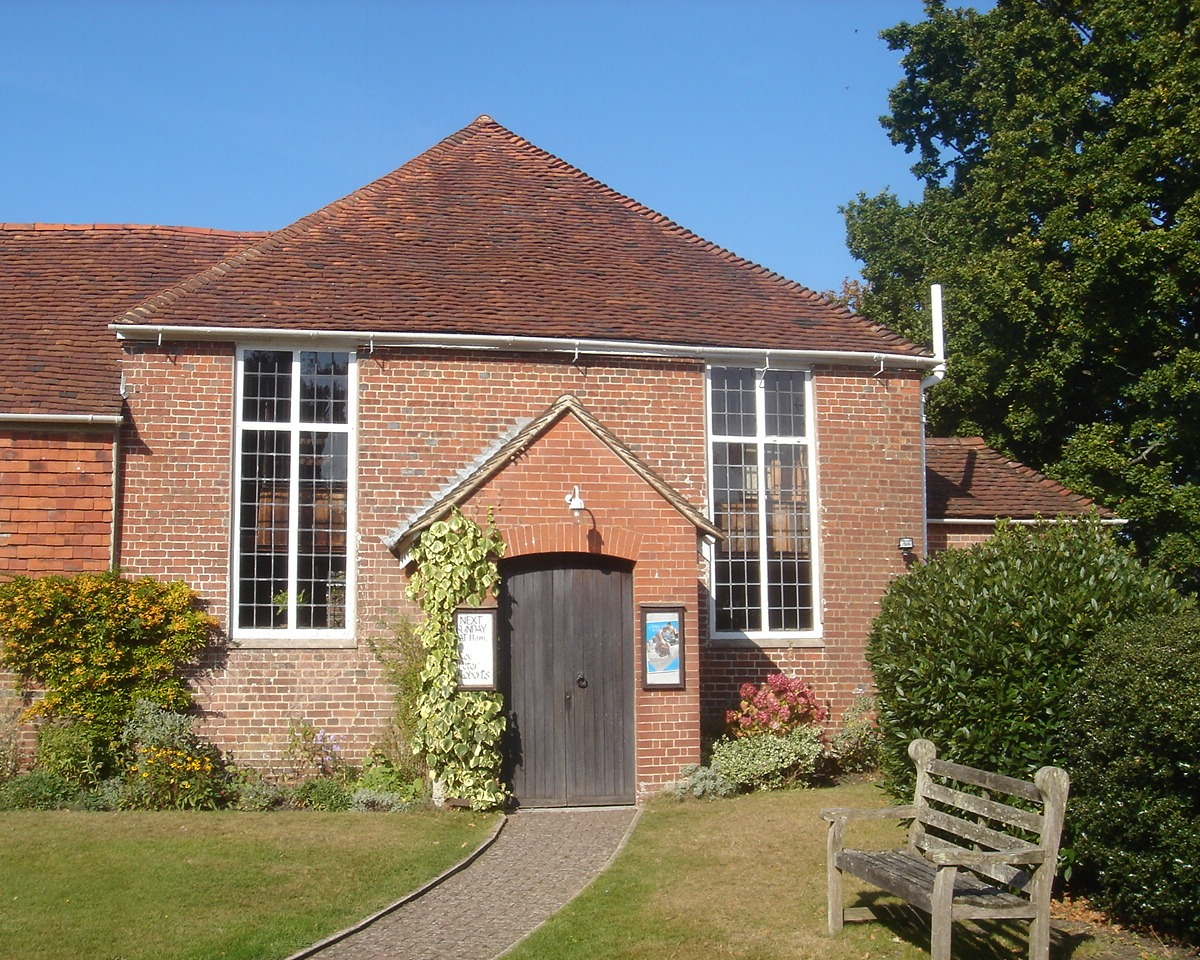
Members of the former General Baptist (now Unitarian) chapel at Ditchling seceded in 1762 and founded the new chapel at Wivelsfield.

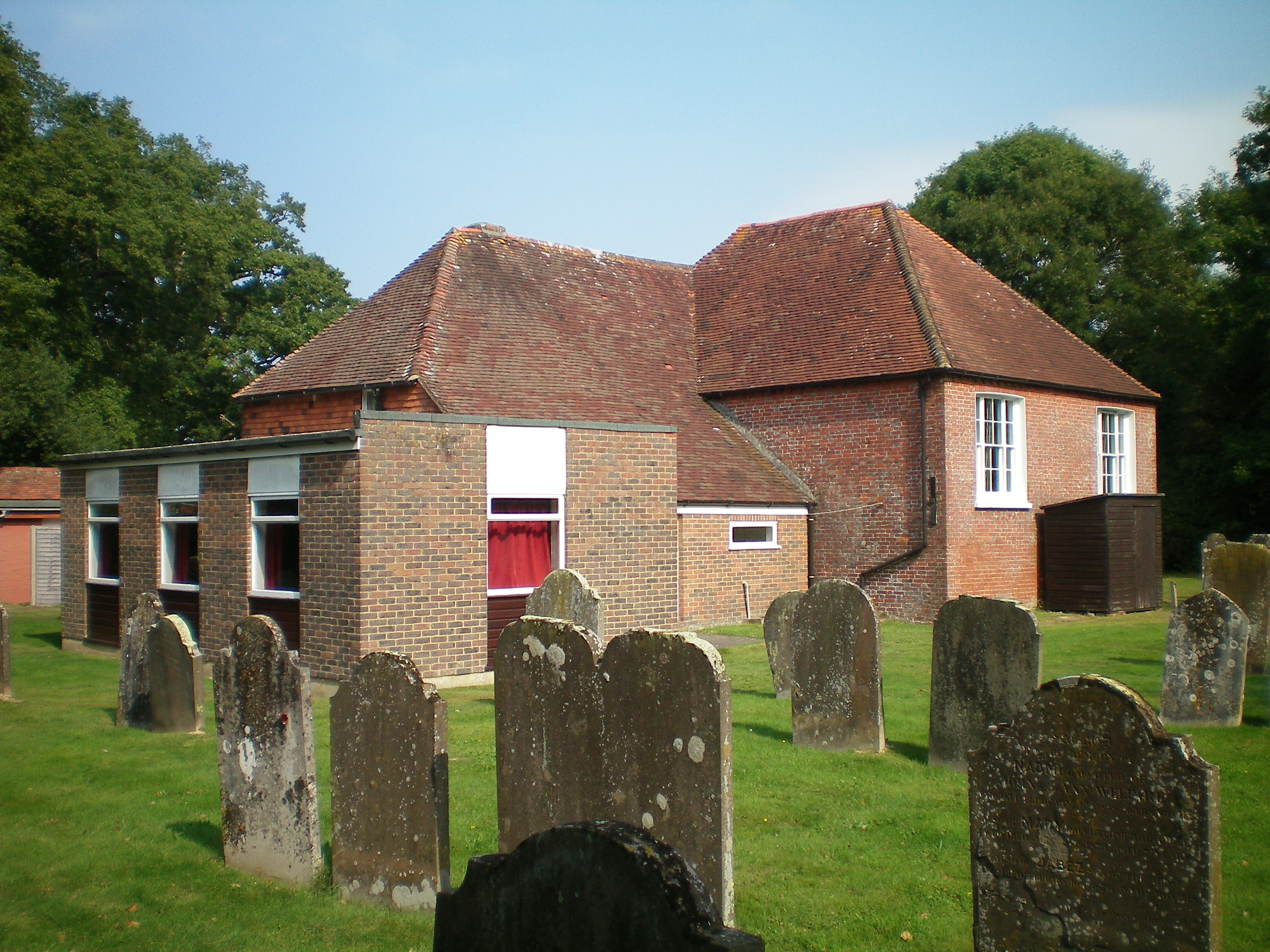
A graveyard surrounds the chapel.

The ecclesiology of many General Baptist chapels in the area changed during the late 18th century: several congregations developed Unitarian views (following the lead of Matthew Caffyn senior and his son, who founded a chapel at Horsham and oversaw its transition to Unitarianism). These changes were not always supported by a chapel's entire congregation, and the changes at Ditchling led to a secession by some members and the founding of a new chapel at Wivelsfield. In 1755, Selina Hastings, Countess of Huntingdon moved to Brighton, then a small but increasingly popular seaside resort. She held Calvinistic beliefs, and invited preachers such as George Whitefield to speak at her house. Soon after, she built a chapel in the grounds. In 1762, Henry Booker—a bricklayer from Ditchling and a member of (and occasional preacher at) the Ditchling General Baptist Chapel—travelled to Brighton to hear Whitefield preaching, on the recommendation of a friend. Whitefield's words had such influence on Booker that he underwent a spiritual conversion and embraced Calvinist doctrines. These did not agree with the principles of the Ditchling chapel, which by the 1760s was mostly Unitarian in character, and Booker was presented in front of 15 General Baptist ministers and asked to justify his beliefs. No longer believing "the Ditchling community to be a true Christian Church", he stated he would "tear the church to pieces", and on 20 October 1762 he was dismissed from the church. Almost immediately, Booker moved to nearby Wivelsfield—taking several members of the Ditchling congregation with him—and together with some Baptist friends in the village he registered a house, Fanners, as a place of worship. In 1763, it was constituted (Note: A term denoting the official formation of a separate church.) as a Particular Baptist chapel, and John Simmonds became its first pastor in 1764. He had been a minister at the Ditchling chapel since 1762, but he too had been dismissed: it was stated in 1764 that "this Church (Note: i.e. Ditchling General Baptist Chapel.) hath sett very unesey under the Hearing of Our Friend John Simmonds ... [we do] not approve of him in the office of the Ministry".

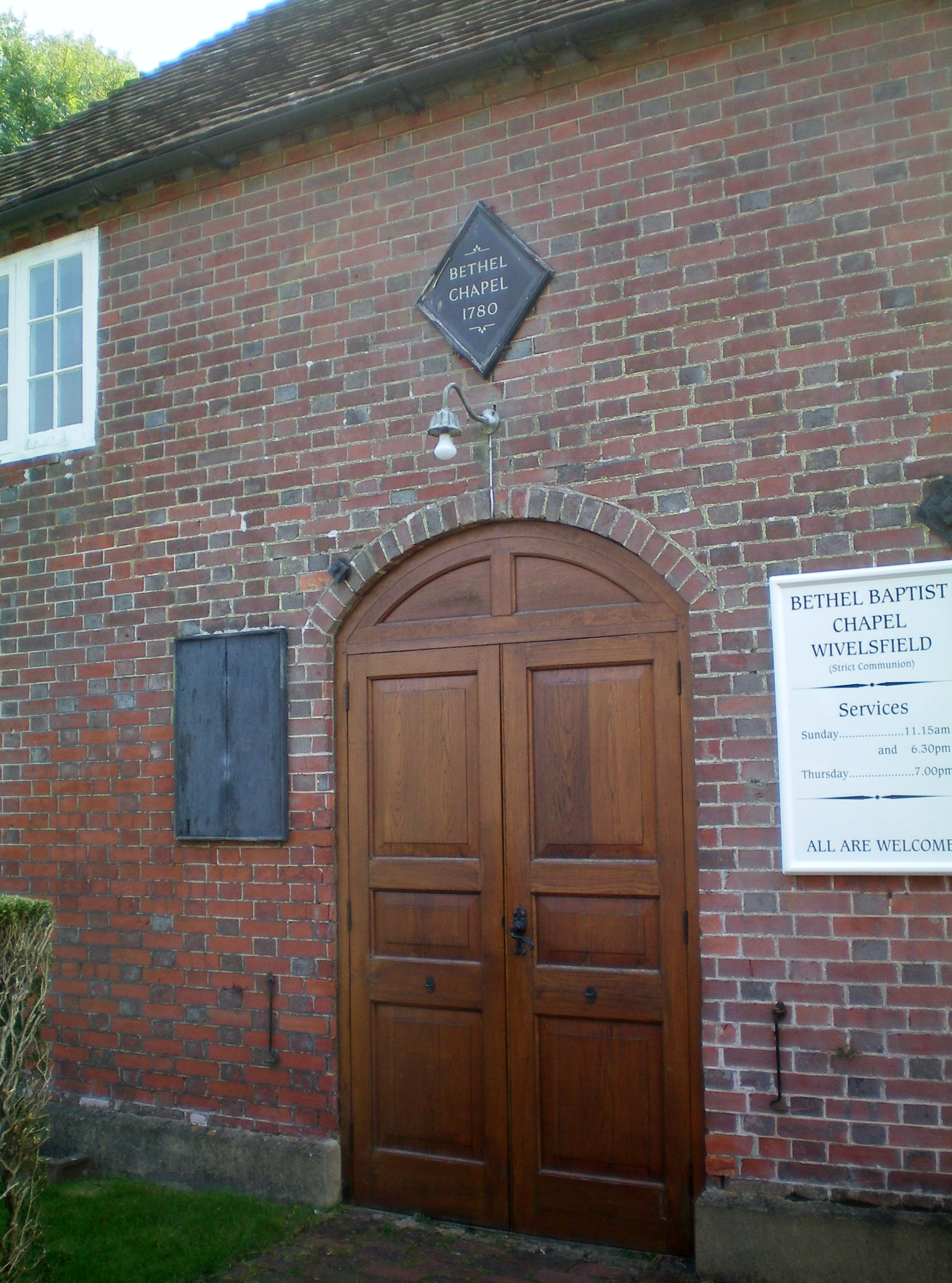
The name bethel chapel and the date 1780 are shown above the chapel entrance.

Another split occurred in 1765, when Simmonds and Booker had a disagreement and more than half the congregation left the chapel, following Simmonds who had returned to his original General Baptist beliefs. In 1768, Henry Booker became the full-time pastor, and meetings moved to his house at Bankside Farm. Two years earlier, he had offered assistance to a group of Particular Baptists in Brighton, and had allowed some members of the Wivelsfield congregation to leave and help form a church—the Salem Baptist Chapel—in the seaside town. (The first building was erected in 1787, and a replacement chapel of 1864 stood until 1974).

The Wivelsfield congregation became part of the Kent and Sussex Baptist Association in 1779. The following year, a chapel was built on land next to Bankside Farm. At that time it was called Wivelsfield Baptist Meeting House, but the name Bethel Chapel was soon adopted. Booker died in 1799, and the chapel was served intermittently by pastors in the next few decades: John Sarjent led the congregation from 1802 until about 1813, and William Coppard served between 1816 and 1818. The chapel thrived at first—an extension had to be built during Sarjent's pastorate—but numbers fell after Coppard's death and the chapel shut for several years. Baptisms were irregular as well: eight people were baptised in the chapel's first year, but in the next 22 years only three more members were received.

The chapel reopened in 1837, and Thomas Baldock's 33-year pastorate from 1840 reinvigorated the cause. He moved to Wivelsfield from Wadhurst, another East Sussex village with a strong Baptist heritage, and many members of his family followed. The Baldocks have remained important in village life ever since. Bethel Chapel has had little alteration since it was built. The burial ground surrounding it was opened in 1780, and a house was built on to one side of the chapel at the same time. It originally housed the pastor but is now used as a baptistery and hall. A door leads to a flat-roofed extension built in 1977.

Bethel Baptist Chapel was designated a Grade II Listed building on 3 February 1977. The attached baptistery was also protected with Grade II listed status on the same day. It is one of three places of worship in Wivelsfield village: St Peter and St John's Church, the Anglican parish church, has much 13th- and 14th-century work and is listed at the higher Grade II*, and the Grade II-listed Ote Hall Congregational Chapel was founded by the Countess of Huntingdon in 1778, by which time she had moved to the village and founded her own Calvinist denomination (the Countess of Huntingdon's Connexion).

As well as the Salem Chapel in Bond Street, Brighton, another chapel in the town was associated with the Wivelsfield cause. George Virgo, the pastor at Wivelsfield from 1874 until 1903, founded a Strict Baptist chapel at Mighell Street in the Carlton Hill area. Co-founder Thomas Boxall was the first pastor from July 1878 until 1893, and Virgo himself took over in that year—leading the chapel as well as undertaking his work at Wivelsfield. Virgo died in 1903, but the chapel was still linked to Wivelsfield until it failed between 1907 and 1910. For about ten years after that it was used as the church hall of the nearby St John the Evangelist's Church; then in 1921 it was bought by a Spiritualist congregation who established Brighton National Spiritualist Church in the building. The chapel was compulsorily purchased in 1961, and four years later the congregation moved into the present Brighton and Hove National Spiritualist Church on nearby Edward Street.

Bethel Chapel is licensed for worship in accordance with the Places of Worship Registration Act 1855 and has the registration number 15568.

== Architecture ==
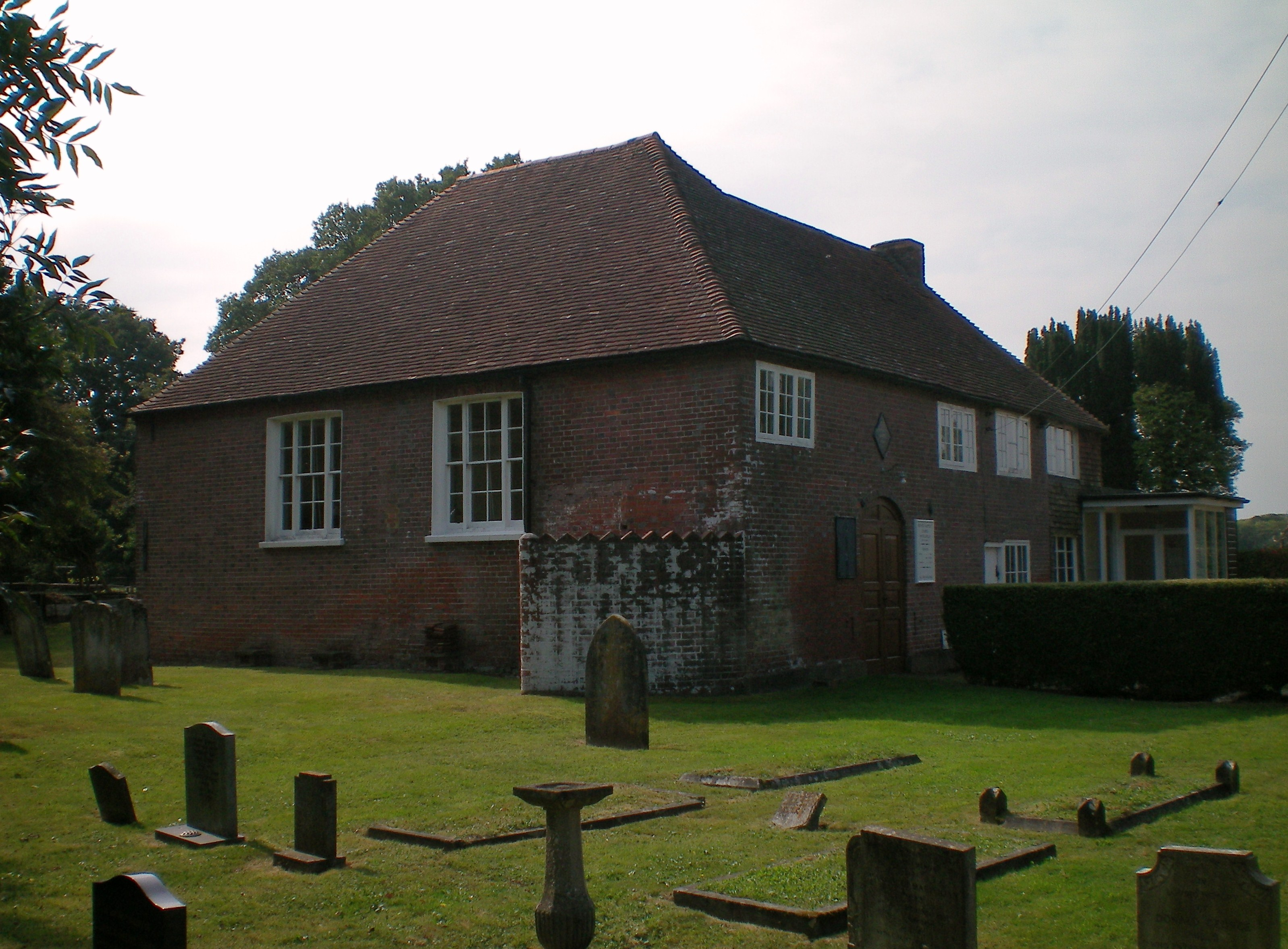
The low brick building has a hipped roof.

Bethel Chapel is a plain, simple Vernacular building which has been extended several times. It has been described as "a quaint and interesting place" with a "quiet and unassuming elegance". The building is of mixed height, mostly two storeys, and is L-shaped. The endmost bay is faced with weatherboarding. The hipped roof is laid with tiles. The earliest part of the chapel is the northern section and the attached cottage at the west end; the two parts formed a modest rectangle. An 18 1/2-foot (5.6 m) extension in the 19th century brought the chapel's internal dimensions up to 35 1/4 by 22 1/2 feet (10.7 m × 6.9 m) and also lengthened the cottage. Of the three surviving entrances, the main, cambered-arched doorway is aligned to the left and has an original panelled wooden door, and the other two have straight-headed doorways with simple wooden doors. Remains of another entrance are still visible. Above the main door is a datestone showing the year 1780. (Note: Incorrectly recorded as "1785" in the English Heritage listing.) There is a four-window range consisting of tripartite casements.

Inside, a wooden gallery runs round the north end. A clock made in Lewes by Thomas Harben is mounted on the front, which is also panelled. The gallery is lit by windows above the main entrance. The benches have open backs and are original, but the seats at ground-floor level were replaced in the 19th century: surplus benches were removed to the chapel from the Ebenezer Chapel in Brighton. A plaster cornice with decorative moulding is also visible inside. The pulpit, also with decorative mouldings, was installed in the early 19th century.

Memorials include monuments in the graveyard commemorating Henry Booker (d. 1799) and his wife Sarah (d. 1779), and inside the chapel an oil painting of Booker, with the legend "First preacher of the Gospel at Bethel Chapel, Wivelsfield, Sussex, 1780, died 22 May 1799 aged 69".

== See also ==
- List of places of worship in Lewes (district)
- List of Strict Baptist churches

== Bibliography ==
- Beevers, David; Marks, Richard; Roles, John (1989). Sussex Churches and Chapels. Brighton: The Royal Pavilion, Art Gallery and Museums. ISBN 0-948723-11-4.
- Chambers, Ralph (1953). The Strict Baptist Chapels of England: Sussex. Vol. 2. Thornton Heath: Ralph Chambers.
- Cheal, Henry (1901). The History of Ditchling in the County of Sussex. Lewes: Lewes & South Counties Press Ltd (facsimile published 2004 by Country Books, Bakewell). ISBN 1-898941-89-0.
- Collis, Rose (2010). The New Encyclopaedia of Brighton. (based on the original by Tim Carder) (1st ed.). Brighton: Brighton & Hove Libraries. ISBN 978-0-9564664-0-2.
- Elleray, D. Robert (2004). Sussex Places of Worship. Worthing: Optimus Books. ISBN 0-9533132-7-1.
- Homan, Roger (1997). "Mission and Fission: the organization of Huntingtonian and Calvinistic Baptist causes in Sussex in the 18th and 19th centuries". Sussex Archaeological Collections. 135. Lewes: Sussex Archaeological Society: 265–282. doi:10.5284/1085045. ISSN 0143-8204.
- Stell, Christopher (2002). Nonconformist Chapels and Meeting-houses in Eastern England. Swindon: English Heritage. ISBN 1-873592-50-7.
- Wivelsfield History Study Group (1994). Wade, Heather (ed.). Wivelsfield: The History of a Wealden Parish. Hurstpierpoint: Pier Point Publishing. ISBN 0-9524577-0-9.
