= American Express Building =

There have been several American Express Buildings, named for the American Express company, including:

- 200 Vesey Street, New York City (current headquarters)
- 65 Broadway, New York City
- 647 Fifth Avenue, New York City
- Amex House, the former European headquarters in the Carlton Hill area of Brighton
