= Carlton Hill, Brighton =

Area of Brighton in East Sussex, England

Coordinates: 50.8236°N 0.1316°W

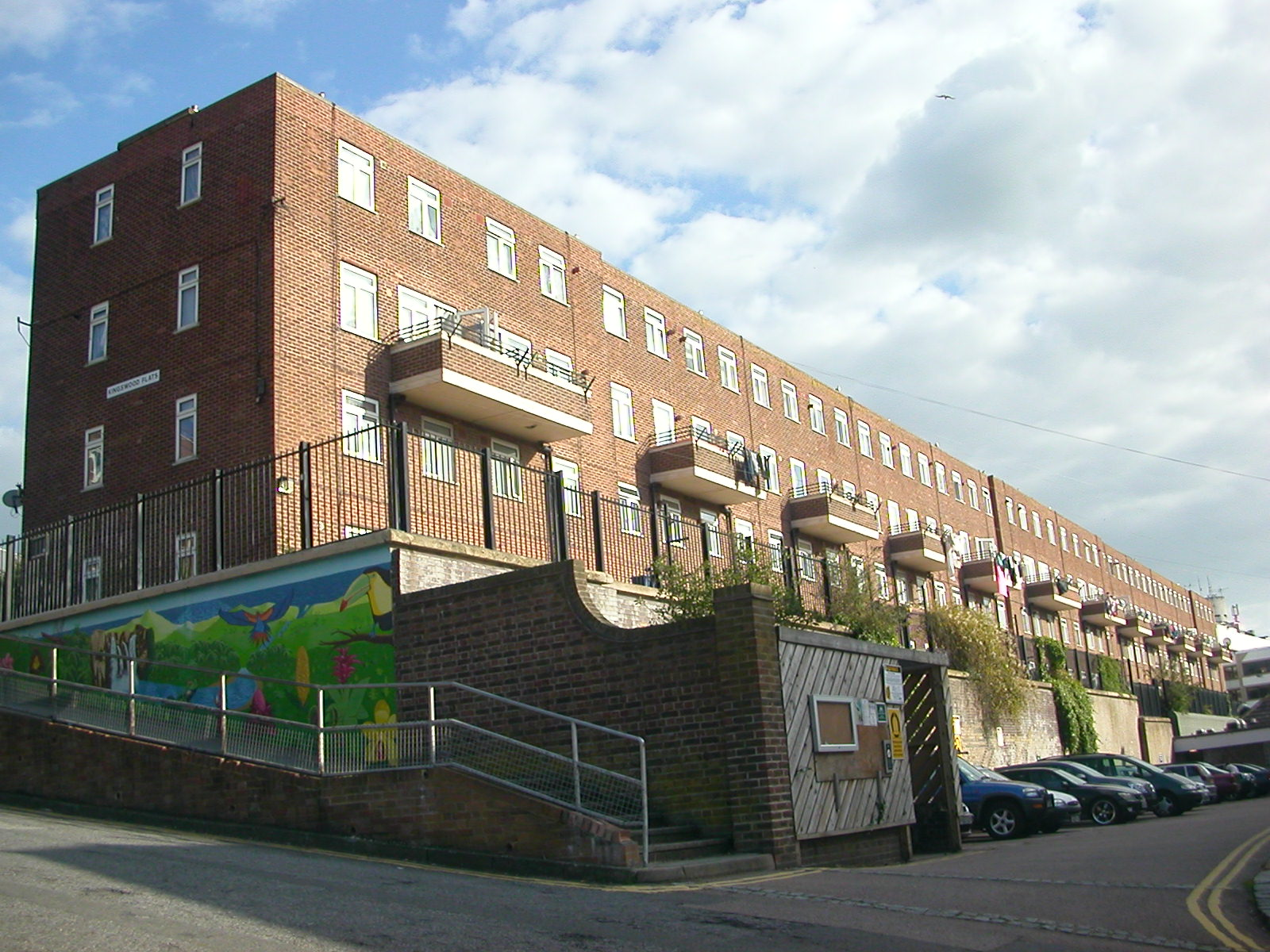
The Kingswood Flats were built in 1938 as part of Brighton Corporation's slum clearance programme.

Carlton Hill is an inner-city area of Brighton, part of the English city and seaside resort of Brighton and Hove. First developed in the early and mid-19th century on steeply sloping farmland east of central Brighton, it grew rapidly as the town became a fashionable, high-class destination. Carlton Hill's population was always poor, though, and by the early 20th century the area was Brighton's worst slum: overcrowding, crime and disease were rife. Extensive slum clearance in the mid-20th century introduced high-density tower blocks, but some old buildings remain: in 2008, Brighton and Hove City Council designated part of Carlton Hill as the city's 34th conservation area. The area now has housing of various styles and ages, large offices and small-scale industry; there are also churches, a school and some open space.

Carlton Hill's pattern of development was defined by the long-established structure of land ownership around Brighton, whereby land was divided into long, narrow strips with many different owners. This encouraged the development of terraced housing—the predominant housing pattern until the council undertook large-scale demolition and high-density rebuilding in the mid-20th century. This work introduced more open space and varied land uses: Brighton Art College was able to expand into the area, and American Express opened a large, visually dominant headquarters.

Buildings lost during the 20th century include schools and several chapels serving various Christian denominations. The former St John the Evangelist's Anglican church was declared redundant and sold to Brighton's Greek Orthodox community; meanwhile, a distinctive Modernist church was built in the 1960s for Spiritualists. A cluster of historic early 19th-century houses and other structures survived the redevelopment, and several were awarded listed status by English Heritage. These buildings and their surroundings were afforded further protection in 2008 when the city council designated the Carlton Hill conservation area.

== Location ==
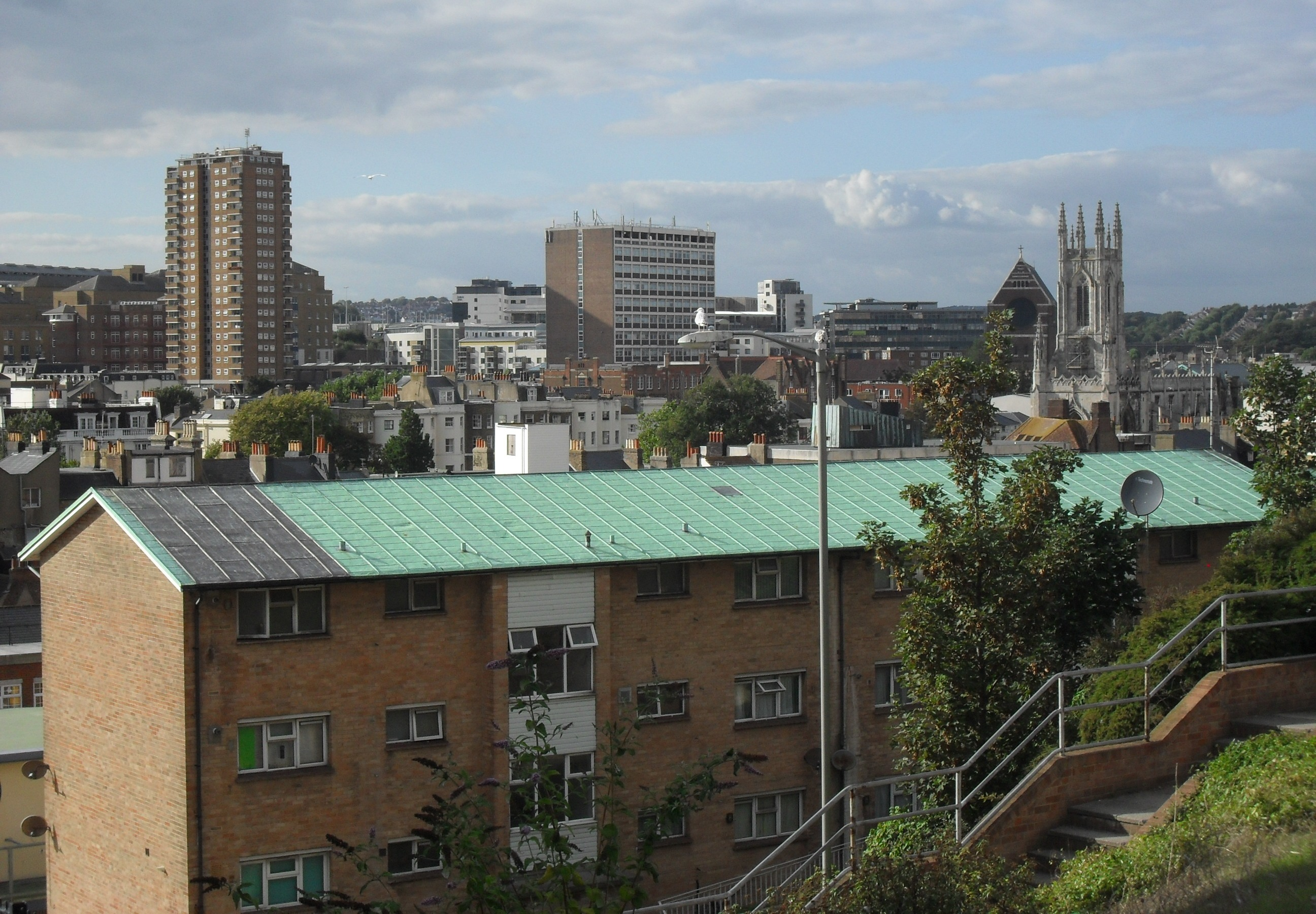
St Peter's and St Bartholomew's Churches, the New England Quarter and the approaches to Brighton railway station are visible in this view looking northwest over the 1960s flats of Nelson Place

Carlton Hill stands on high ground immediately east of the centre of Brighton. Its western boundary, Grand Parade, is part of the main road to London; Edward Street, a major road leading towards Kemp Town and the eastbound coast road, forms the southern boundary; the Queen's Park residential area is to the east; and the densely populated terraced housing of Hanover lies to the north. The main road through the area runs from west to east and is also called Carlton Hill. Albion Hill, another steeply sloping west–east road, forms the northern boundary between Hanover and Carlton Hill; the area north of Sussex Street is sometimes referred to as Albion Hill. The high ground of the area reaches a summit of 230 feet (70 m) at Windmill Terrace, between Albion Hill and Richmond Street. The latter was Brighton's steepest road until redevelopment in the 1960s severed it: its 1:5 gradient necessitated a full-width wall halfway along, to intercept runaway handcarts and other vehicles.

The area is not prominent on Brighton's skyline, but good views are possible from its streets, especially westwards and southwestwards towards the sea and across the valley floor in which Old Steine and the old town are situated. Tarner Park, an open space in the centre of the conservation area, offers long views through nearly 180°.

== History ==
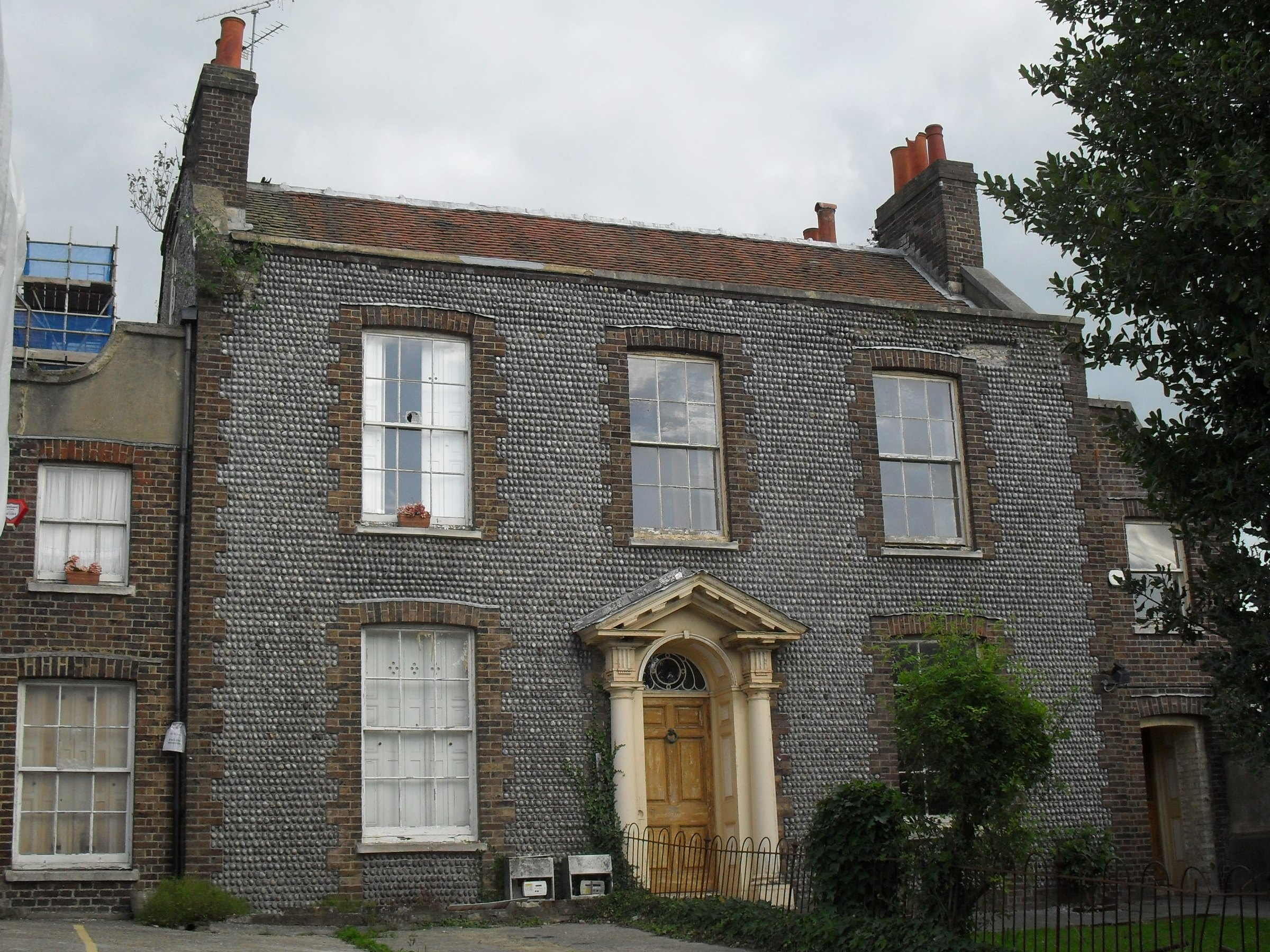
The former Mighell Farmhouse stands on the stub of Mighell Street. Amex House now occupies the rest of the site.

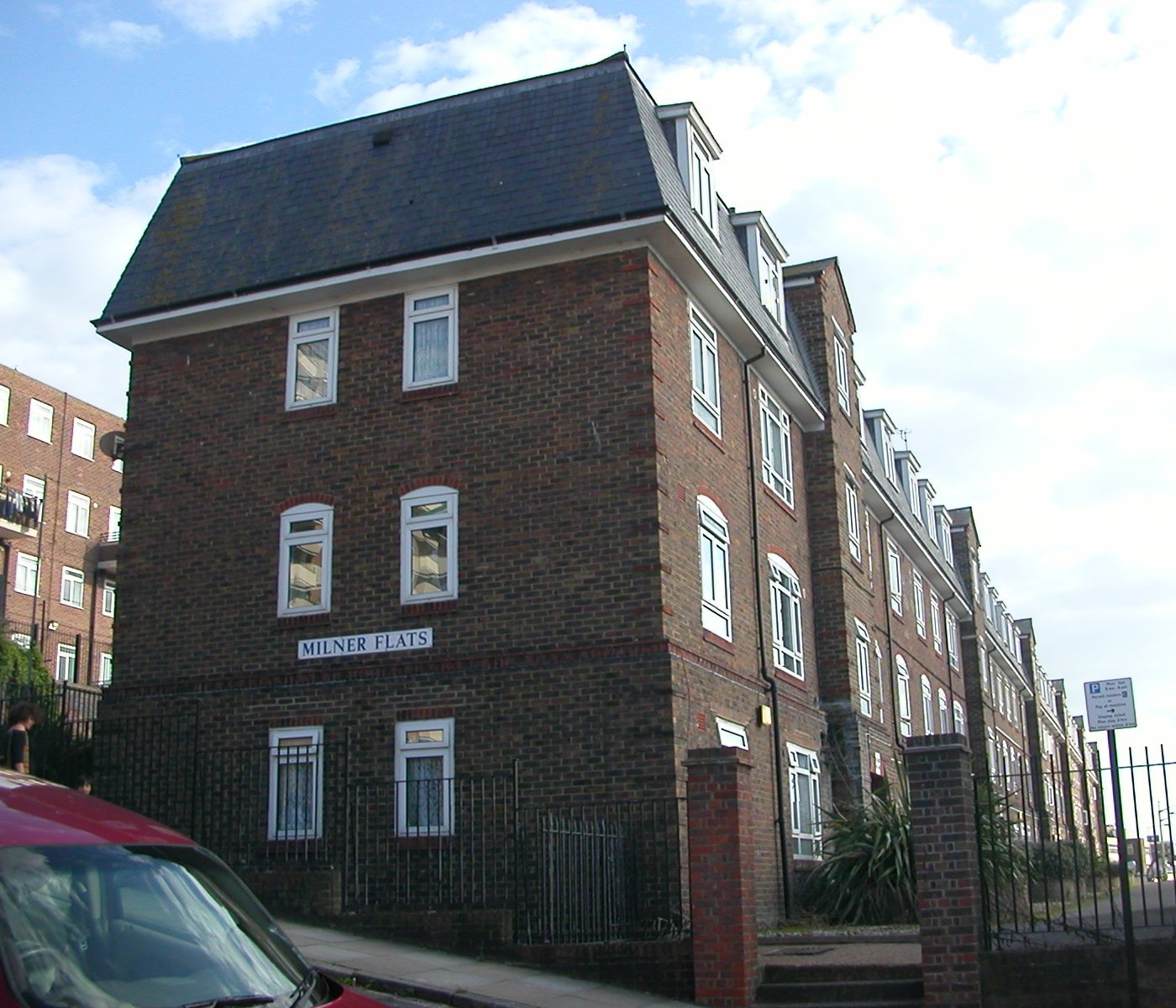
The Milner Flats were the first flats built by the council in Brighton.

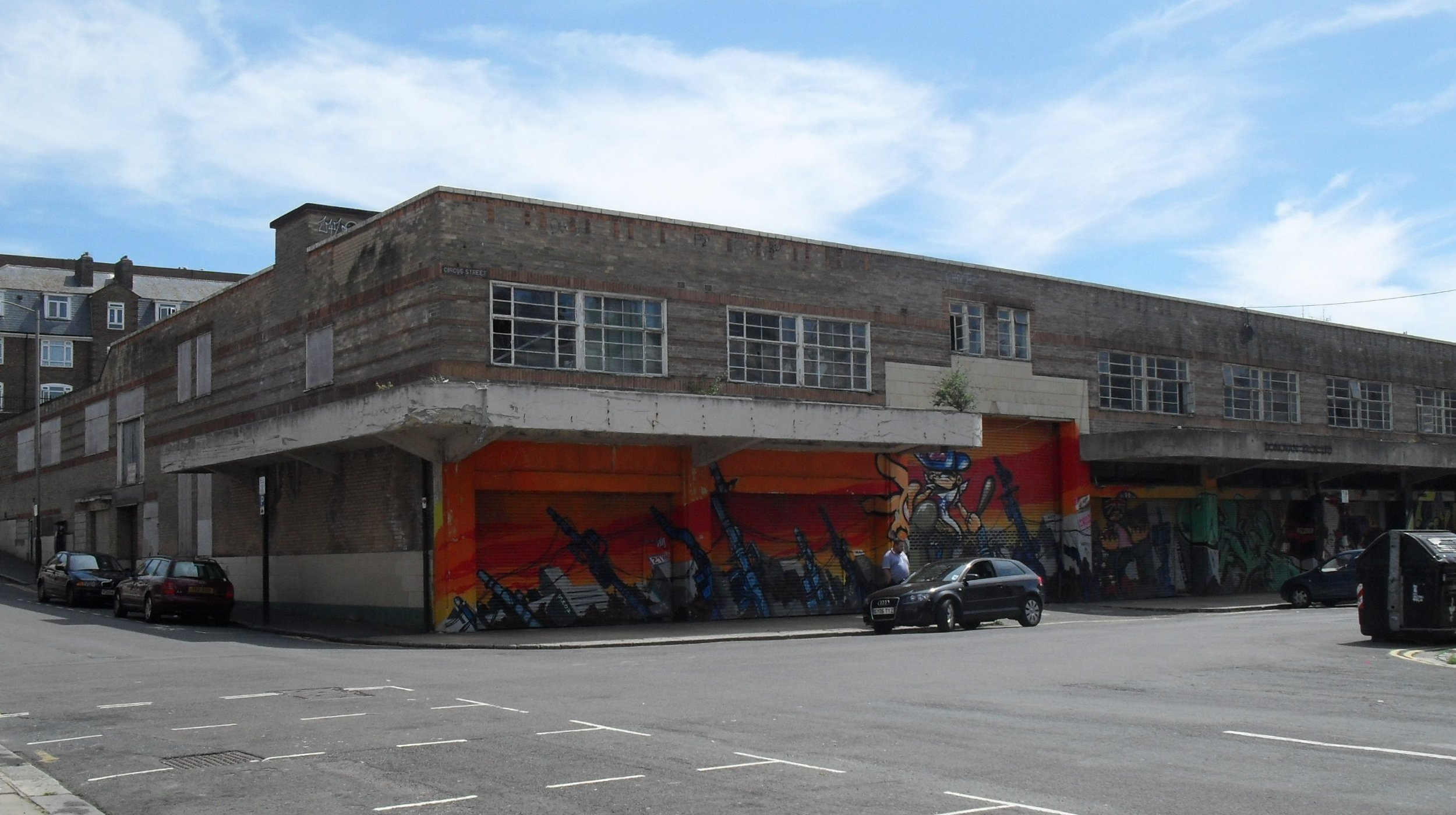
The Circus Street Municipal Market operated from 1937 until 2005.

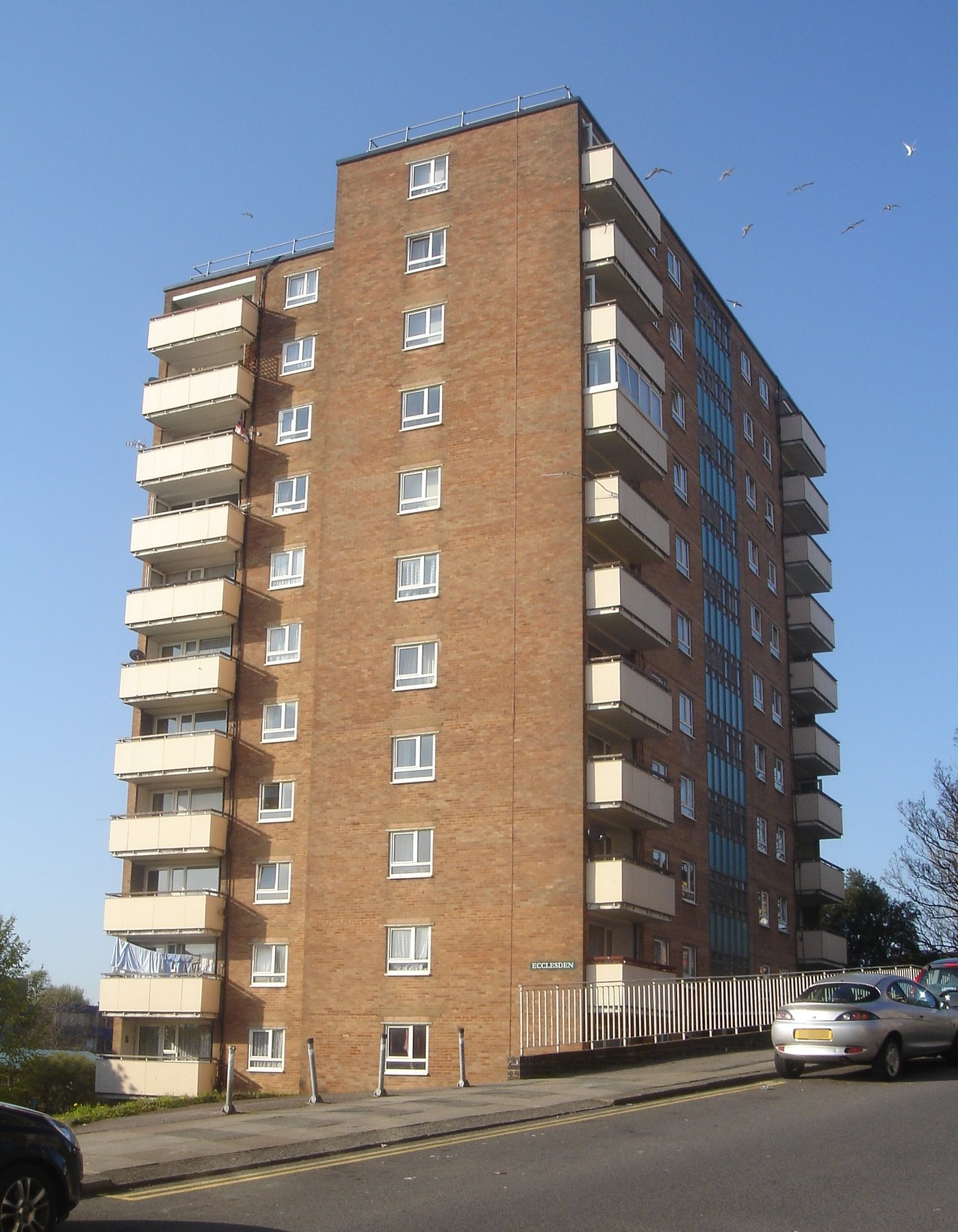
Ecclesden is one of seven 11-storey blocks of flats on Grove Hill and Ashton Rise.

Brighton's origins lie in the Saxon fishing and agricultural village of Bristelmestune. The English Channel formed its southern limit, but on all other sides was farmland divided into open fields called laines. These were further subdivided into furlongs—wide parallel strips—and paul-pieces, which were much narrower strips. Despite their small size, neighbouring paul-pieces often had different owners. Wide paths (leakways) ran at right-angles to the furlongs, separating them. This ancient land-use pattern, which survived until the 18th century despite its unsuitability for contemporary farming methods, significantly influenced the pattern of urban development in 18th- and 19th-century Brighton.

Hilly Laine was one of Brighton's five laines. It was northeast of the Steine (later called Old Steine), the centre of fashionable society in the 18th century, and rose steeply eastwards from an area of sheltered flatter land close to the Steine. Some fields were used for small-scale activities such as limeburning and market gardening, but most were farmed by individuals. The laine had several furlongs; the second of these, which now forms the heart of the conservation area, was separated from its neighbours by leakways which became Carlton Hill (the road) and Sussex Street. Much of the land in this area was owned by Dr Benjamin Scutt, whose landholdings extended into the neighbouring village of Hove (the Brunswick estate was built on land he sold in the 1820s). Starting around 1800, the land was gradually sold to developers; Edward Street was laid out in 1804 and quickly experienced a "mini building boom" with inns, stables and small workshops. John Street, on the first (westernmost) furlong of Hilly Laine, was built up by 1810: its developer, John Hall, laid out plots for 11 by 15 feet (3.4 m × 4.6 m) houses and started building and selling them in 1805. Carlton Street, by another developer, followed by 1807. Meanwhile, development continued slowly on the second furlong: four paul-pieces were occupied with buildings by 1819.

Scutt's land sales helped him fund the development of Carlton Place, an architectural set-piece consisting of a 20-house terrace surrounding a riding school, the Royal Circus; the development took place between 1806 and 1808. Named after Carlton House, the Prince Regent's London home, the development was on a larger scale than the rest of Carlton Hill's houses: each plot measured 17 by 60 feet (5.2 m × 18.3 m). Each cost about £410 (£42,000 in 2023) to build, and proved to be profitable: one sold for £700 (£72,000 in 2023) in 1806 to a local vicar, who later bought two more to rent out. A survey of the town's housing by the Brighton Town Commissioners in 1814 valued Carlton Place within the top 25% of all houses in Brighton. Scutt laid out three more streets nearby at the same time: Carlton Mews, Carlton Row and Woburn Place were narrow roads crowded with small houses, stables and workshops. Meanwhile, a farmhouse was built at an unknown time in the early 19th century on nearby Mighell Street; it may have moved from agricultural to residential and commercial use later that century, and has an obscure early history.

Built as Patriot Place in the mid-1810s, Tilbury Place (renamed in the 1860s) and its five houses stood next to the farm and formed a pocket of high-class residential development in a mostly working-class area of small houses. Number 1, also called St John's Lodge, was the largest, and was built for Edward Tarner (a merchant) and his wife Letitia, whose maiden name was Tilbury. It passed through the family until 1933, when Letitia Tilbury Tarner, a descendant, left it to her cousin Clara Isabella Bryan, who sold it in 1938 to Brighton Corporation for charitable purposes. It was converted into Tarner Home, a nursing and care institute for poor people, and later became a hostel. Nos 1-5 Tilbury Place are now owned by a housing association and used as housing.

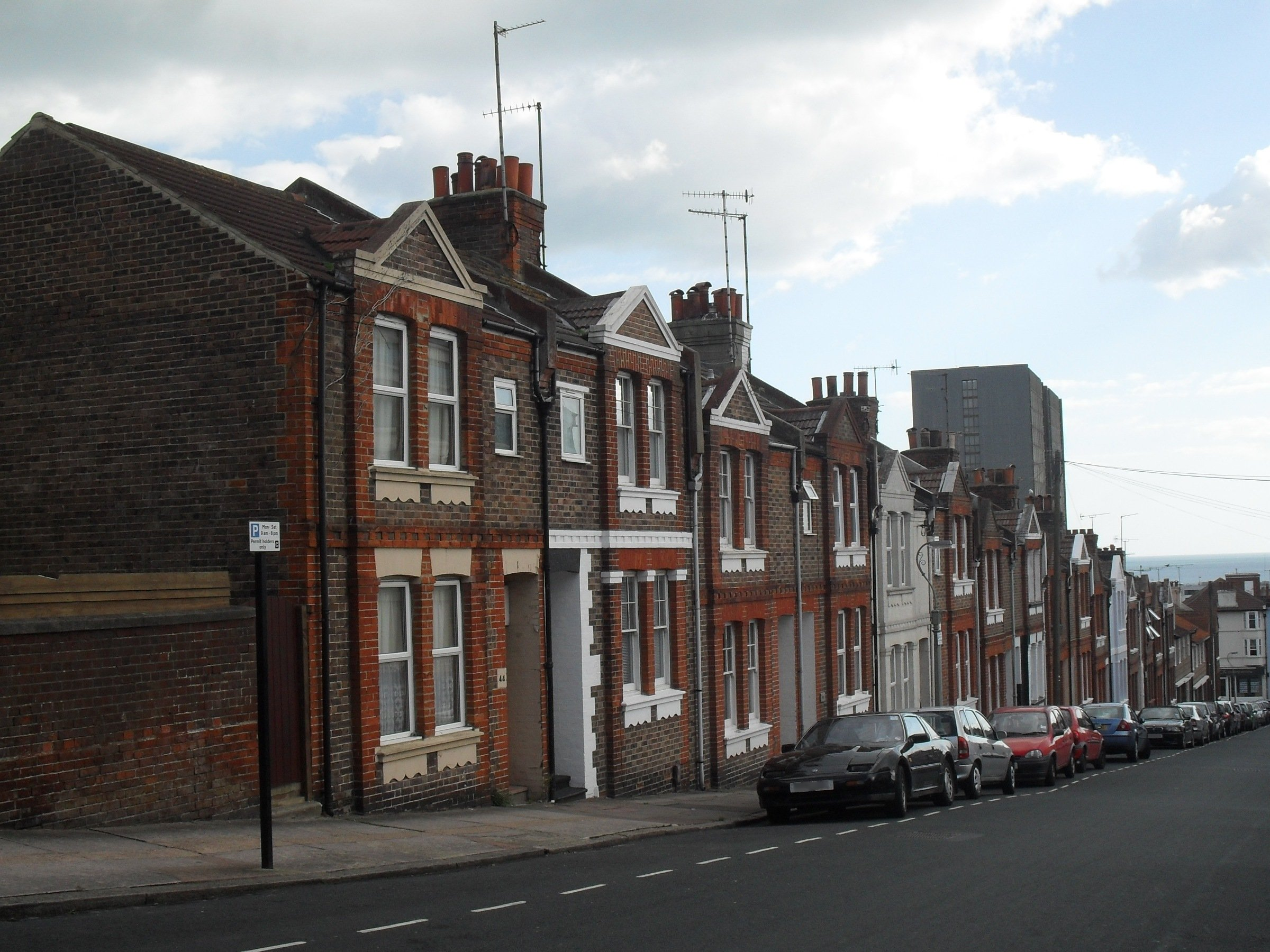
White Street's red-brick houses date from the 1880s.

Apart from some land north of Sussex Street that remained agricultural until the 20th century, the whole hillside was covered with (mostly terraced) houses, small workshops and industrial structures, inns and other modest buildings by the mid-19th century. As early as 1840, the area was considered to be affected by poverty and its high population density. Brighton Corporation undertook some slum clearance in the 1880s, when White and Blaker Streets were laid out between Carlton Hill and Edward Street. By this time, Carlton Hill was known as Brighton's "foreign quarter", where many Italian and French street vendors—who sold food of various types on Brighton beach, in the town centre and from door to door—settled. Brighton's fishing industry still thrived into the early 20th century, and many fishermen lived in Carlton Hill and used its workshops and warehouses to cure and smoke their herring catches. A contemporary writer, quoted by Brighton historian Clifford Musgrave, observed that "an aromatic and appetising pall would envelop the entire neighbourhood, kippering both fish and residents alike".

In the late 19th century and early 20th century, Carlton Hill's notoriety as a slum increased. Poverty, drunkenness, disease and low living standards were rife. Brighton's reputation was damaged by a disparaging article in The Lancet in 1882: making reference to Carlton Hill, it criticised the town's poor standards of health. Assisted by government funding, Brighton Corporation undertook extensive slum clearance from 1928 until the start of World War II, transforming the area's appearance. Two large blocks of flats—Brighton Corporation's first council flats—were built to rehouse many of the displaced residents. The Milner Flats, a long four-storey block, stand on the site of Woburn Place, and were completed in 1934. Alderman Hugh Milner Black, a Corporation member who campaigned for housing improvements in Brighton, was commemorated in the naming. Kingswood Flats, on the site of Nelson Place and a Primitive Methodist chapel, were built in 1938. The name refers to Minister for Health Kingsley Wood. Some displaced residents were moved out of the area: the new council estates of Whitehawk and Moulsecoomb, built in the 1920s and early 1930s on the fringe of Brighton, accommodated many former Carlton Hill residents. An earlier low-rise development took place in 1931, when the small Tarnerland council estate was built on empty land near Tilbury Place.

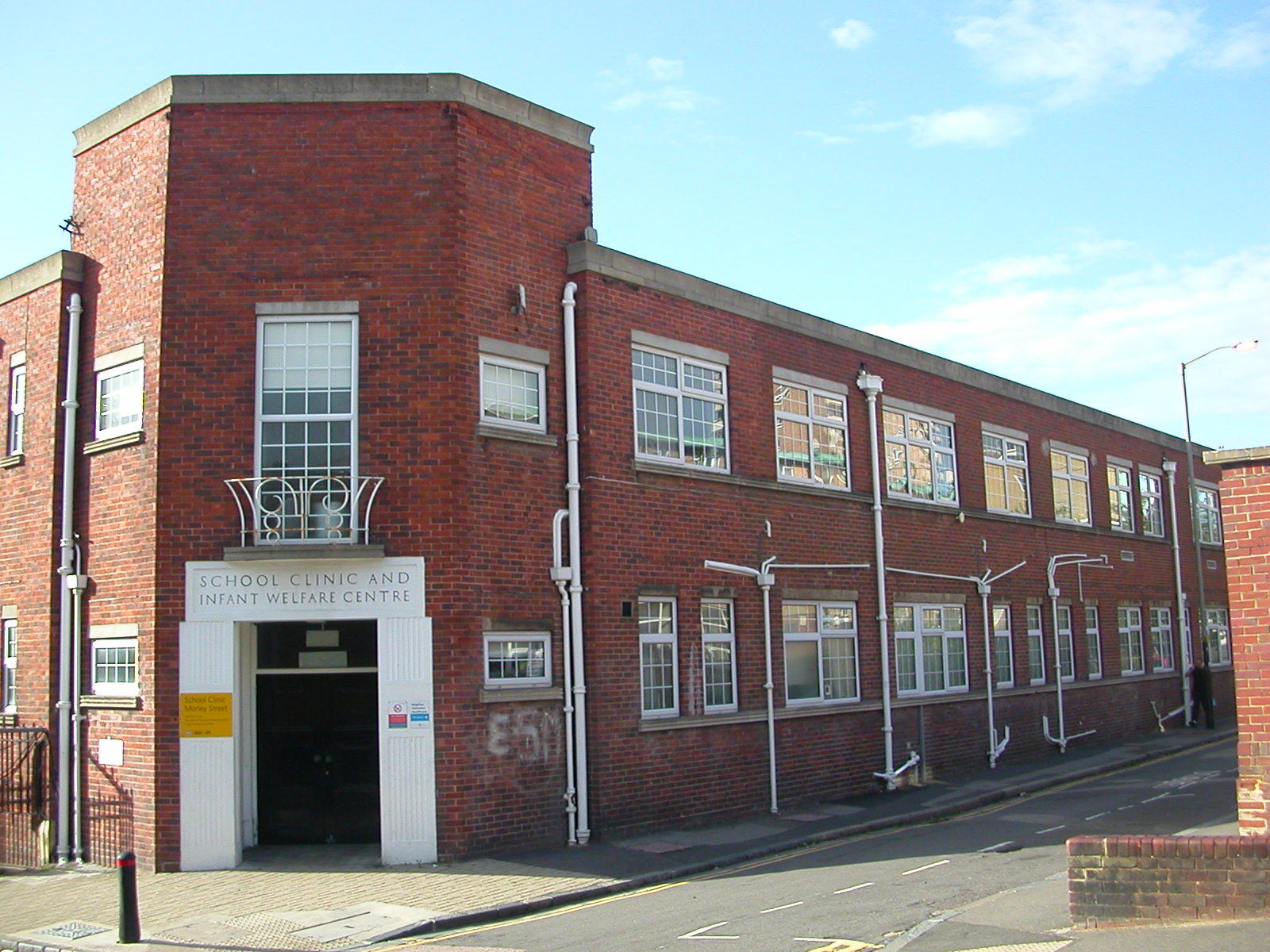
The Morley Street Infant Welfare Clinic was built by Brighton Corporation in 1938.

The corporation also provided non-residential buildings on the cleared land. The Circus Street Municipal Market, on a wide street built behind Scutt's Royal Circus riding school, opened in January 1937 and became one of Brighton's main markets. A former chapel and many terraced houses had stood on the site, whose redevelopment cost £75,000 (£6,112,900 in 2023). A fish market, moved from a site near the beach, was added in 1960. The building closed in 2005 and has been empty since then, apart from its use as a temporary exhibition centre during the 2009 Brighton Festival—when sculptor Anish Kapoor showed a new work there. Two clinics, specialising in chest complaints and child welfare, opened on the north side of Sussex Street, opposite the market, in 1936 and 1938 respectively. The chest clinic closed in 1989. The lower part of Sussex Street was renamed Morley Street at this time. Brighton Corporation compulsorily purchased Carlton Place in about 1955 and demolished the houses and former riding school in favour of new housing. John Street became the site of two important civic buildings in the mid-1960s: Brighton's central police station was opened in 1965, followed by the new county court building two years later.

Clearances around Albion Hill began in the 1950s. From 1959, the narrow, densely populated terraces between Albion Hill and Morley Street were cleared and replaced with landscaped open space and seven tower blocks—Brighton's first such buildings. The first, Highleigh, opened on 11 May 1961. Like its later neighbours, it has 11 storeys. The steep Richmond Street was severed as part of this redevelopment; its lower section was replaced by a zig-zag path down the hillside and a short road called Richmond Parade, and new roads (Grove Hill and Ashton Rise) were built between the tower blocks and across the slope of the hill. Similarly, the lowest section of Carlton Hill was renamed Kingswood Street when it was redeveloped in the 1960s: Brighton Art College (now part of the University of Brighton) was extended in 1967 by Brighton borough architect Percy Billington, taking up a large corner plot.

In the mid-1970s, American Express sought land in Brighton to build a new European headquarters. The company had a long association with Sussex, and opened a mechanical accounting centre in a building on Edward Street in 1968. Most of Mighell Street and all of its buildings—except the old farmhouse—and some neighbouring streets were demolished and replaced by the 300,000-square-foot (28,000 m^{2}) Amex House, a nine-storey office building designed by American architecture firm Gollins, Melvin, Ward and Partners. A legislative order was raised by the Secretary of State for the Environment in mid-1973 to allow Mighell Street to be severed. In September 2008, American Express announced plans to demolish and replace the building. The new office is set slightly further back, closer to Carlton Hill (the road), and better road access will be provided by means of a new entrance from John Street. The city council granted planning permission in November 2009, and preliminary building work started in early 2010. The work was completed in 2012 and the old Amex House was demolished in 2017.

== Buildings ==
=== Churches ===
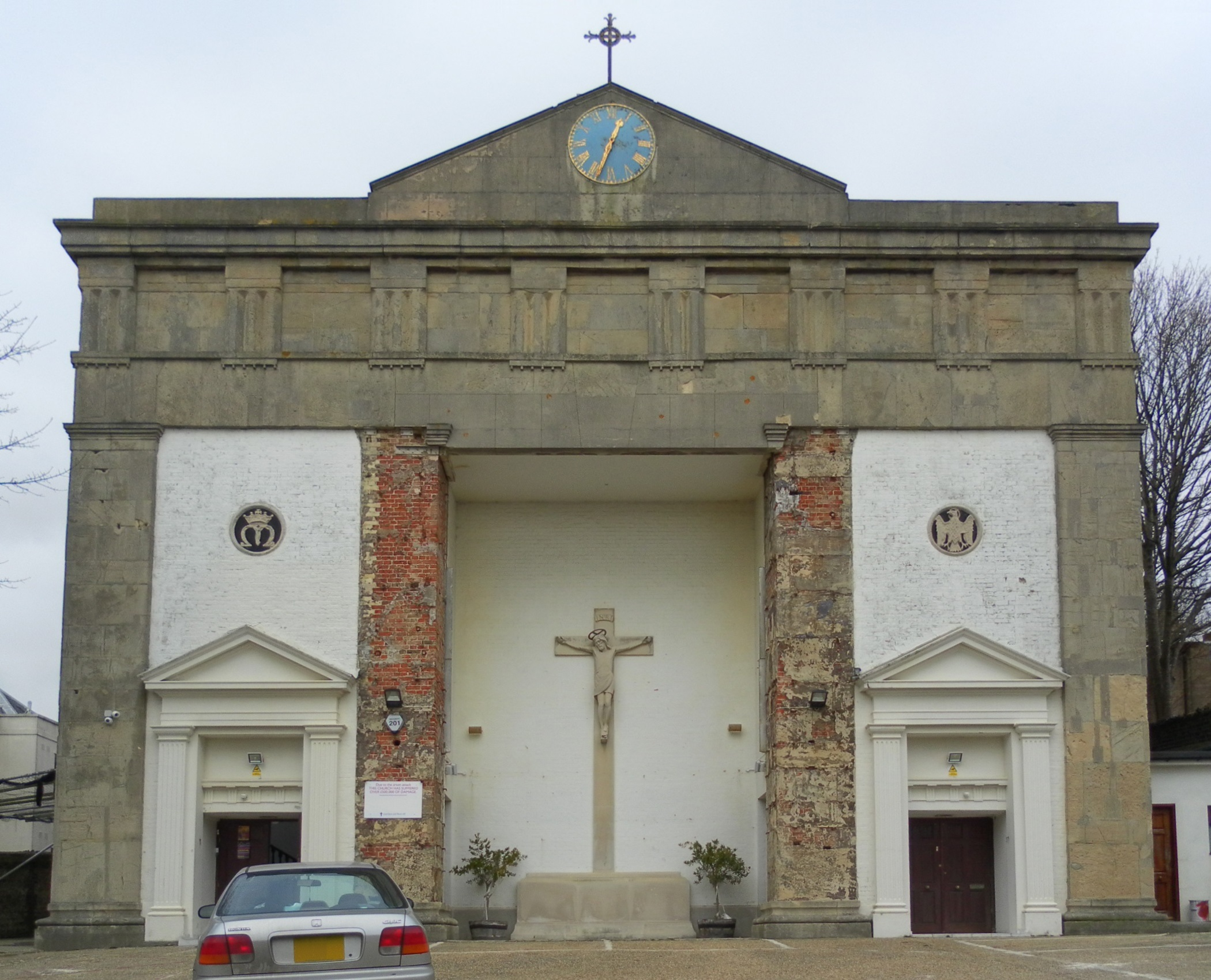
The Greek Orthodox Church of the Holy Trinity was established in 1986 in this former Anglican church of 1838.

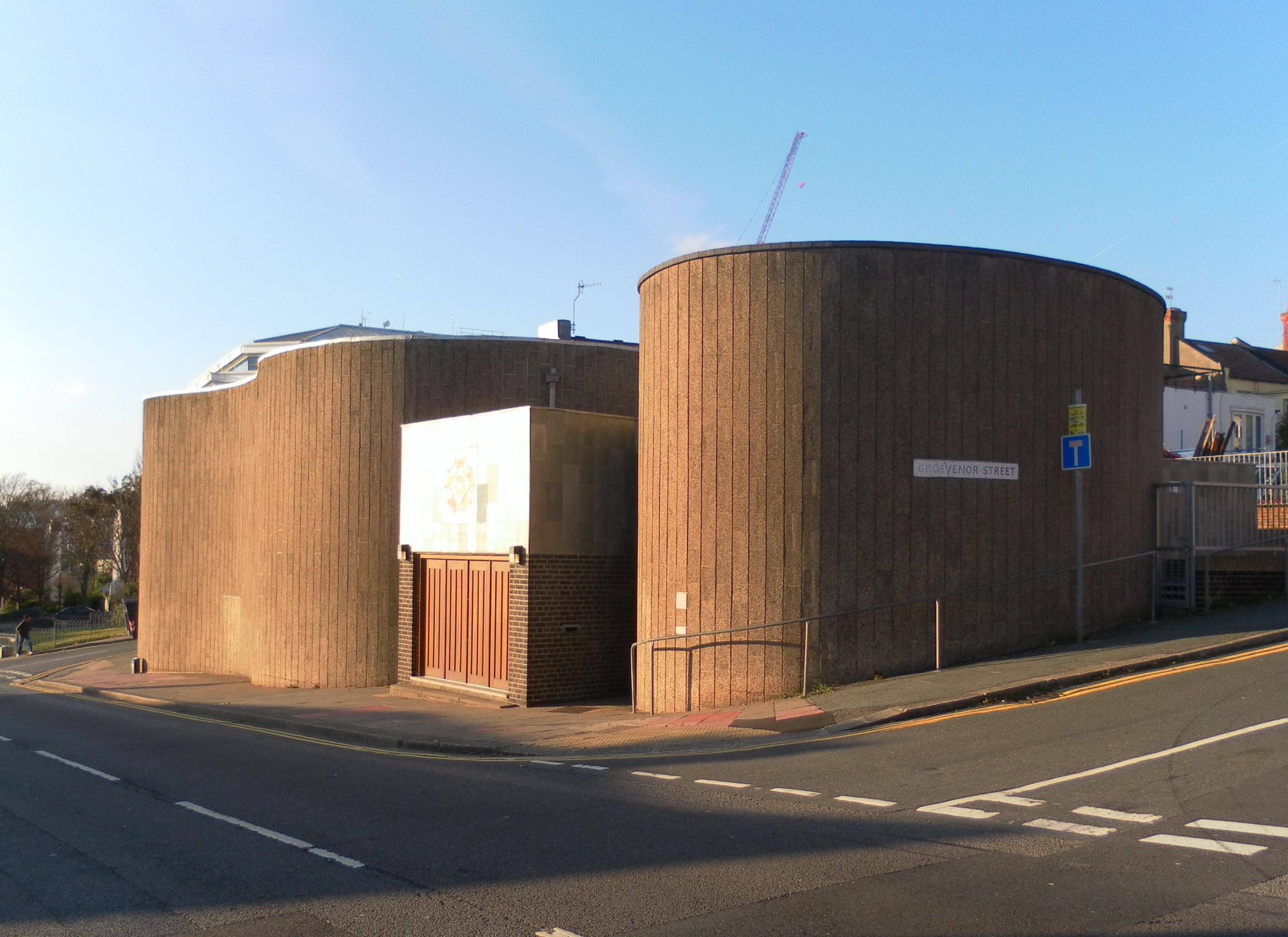
The Brighton and Hove National Spiritualist Church stands on Edward Street.

Early in its development, Carlton Hill was provided with an Anglican church. St John the Evangelist's Church, opposite the junction of Carlton Hill and White Street, was designed by George Cheesman junior in a "strangely bleak" Greek Revival/Neo-Georgian style in 1838, with Doric columns and a stuccoed and pedimented façade. Never successful in attracting large congregations, it was declared redundant by the Diocese of Chichester in 1980. Proposals for its conversion into a drug detoxification centre were opposed, and in March 1986 the Greek Orthodox community, which had been worshipping elsewhere in Brighton, bought the church and rededicated it as the Church of the Holy Trinity. The building was severely damaged by fire in July 2010.

The Ebenezer Reformed Baptist Church has occupied three buildings on two different sites in Carlton Hill. It was founded in 1825, and the first service was held on 13 April of that year in a stuccoed Renaissance-style building on the north side of Richmond Street. The chapel, with ebenezer chapel erected a.d. 1825 prominently displayed on its entablature, was locally nicknamed "The Lemon Squeezer". It was demolished in 1966 during the redevelopment of the Richmond Street area. Architect C.J. Wood built a new church in the Vernacular style on the opposite side of Richmond Parade, backing on to Ivory Place, in the same year. It was in turn demolished in 2007, and a six-storey block of flats with a new church on the ground floor was built in its place. This opened in August 2010.

Five other chapels were demolished during the area's 20th-century redevelopment. The Sussex Street Strict Baptist Chapel stood on the section of that road which is now named Morley Street. It had lancet windows and a stuccoed exterior, and opened in 1867. The congregation moved out in 1895, and St Margaret's Church in Cannon Place established a mission hall in the building. The Circus Street market was built on the site after its demolition in 1937. Also on Sussex Street, a Primitive Methodist chapel was founded in 1836. The Kingswood Flats now occupy the site of the building, which closed in about 1950. Mighell Street Hall, demolished in 1965, stood on land now covered by Amex House. It was used by Baptists from 1878, then as the church hall of St John the Evangelist's, and finally (from January 1949) by Spiritualists. When the new Brighton National Spiritualist Church, a figure-of-eight concrete building, opened on Edward Street in 1965, the hall closed for good. The Carlton Hill Apostolic Church stood for 99 years until 1964, although its Catholic Apostolic congregation moved out in 1954. Latterly it was used as student housing for the adjacent Brighton Art College, which extended its premises onto the site when the building was demolished. The Salvation Army had a citadel at the junction of Edward Street and the now vanished Riding School Lane (near Mighell Street) from 1884 until 1965, when it was demolished for road widening. The denomination registered another building for worship and marriages in 1971: it stood at the junction of Carlton Hill and Mighell Street, and was deregistered in 1985.

=== Schools ===
Carlton Hill Primary School was built by the Local education authority in 1963. It is on the boundary of the conservation area, between Sussex Street and Carlton Hill (the road) on the west side of Tilbury Place, and is well screened by trees. It has a tall wooden fence that, according to the council's Conservation Area Character Statement, "visually intrudes on the approach to the conservation area and harms its setting". It recommends replacing the fence with a flint wall. The school adjoins the site that is being redeveloped for the new American Express headquarters: the company paid the school £300,000 (a condition of the council's approval of the planning application) to compensate for the effect on its playground, which will be overlooked by the building, and the building contractor Sir Robert McAlpine has paid for a school crossing patrol officer to help children cross Carlton Hill safely during the construction period.

Several schools were founded in the mid-19th century. A Ragged Schools Union school stood on Carlton Street from the mid-1850s, and St John the Evangelist's Church established its own school in 1870 on Carlton Hill. This was rebuilt in 1914, and later housed the American Express social club until its demolition in early 2010. Board schools were set up in 1873 on Richmond Street and 1883 on Circus Street. The Richmond Street school was the first in Brighton to offer school meals. The two Board schools merged in 1926 and took the name Sussex Street School, after which the Circus Street building closed. It was later sold to Brighton Polytechnic (now the University of Brighton). The Richmond Street school ran along the west side of Claremont Row between Richmond and Sussex Streets; playgrounds separated the boys' and girls' sections. In October 1930, a nursery section was added. The school was compulsorily purchased in 1959 and demolished for redevelopment; Carlton Hill Primary School was built to replace it.

The Margaret Macmillan Open Air Nursery was built on part of the grounds of number 1 Tilbury Place in the 1930s, partly funded by Letitia Tilbury Tarner, who had sold the land required to the Brighton and Hove Nursery Schools Association in 1931, and bequeathed £800 to the association in her will. A nursery school still stands on the site.

=== Civic, commercial and public buildings ===
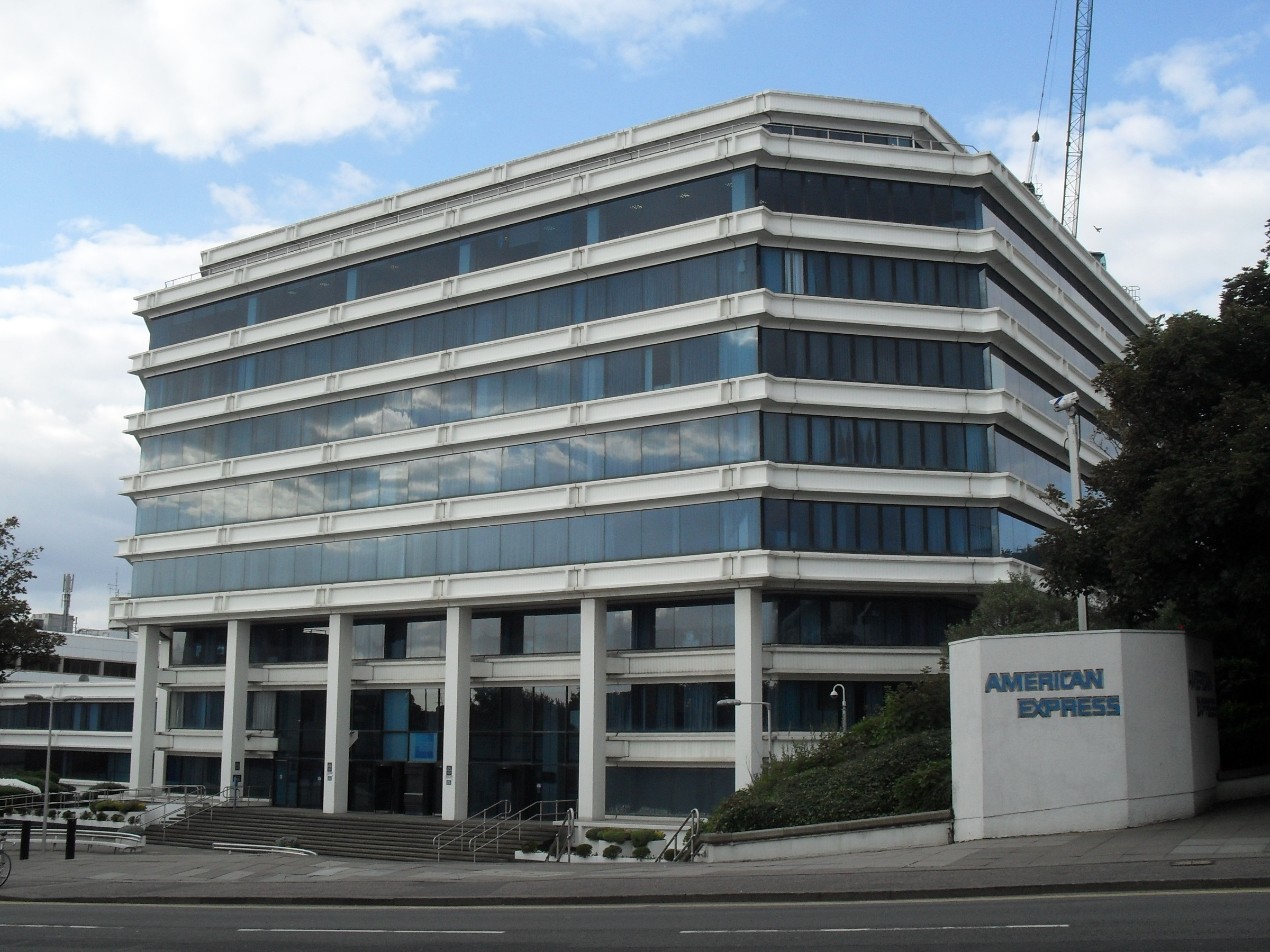
Amex House, a nine-storey office block, opened in 1977.

Amex House (demolished 2017) was said to "dominates the sweep of Carlton Hill" and was visible on the skyline from much of Brighton. Designed by British architecture firm Gollins Melvin and Ward, the building had prominent white horizontal bands of glass-reinforced plastic and blue-tinted glazing, and its corners were chamfered to give it a more rounded appearance. It was nicknamed "The Wedding Cake", and its clean, futuristic design has been said to evoke Thunderbirds. It was replaced as the headquarters of American Express in 2012 by a new building on a neighbouring site, named 1 St Johns Place.

Prior House, at the north end of Tilbury Place, was built in 1936 for the Brighton Girls' Club. This institution was founded in 1928 at Nelson Row, and was displaced from its original premises in 1934 when the Kingswood Flats were built on the site. In 1970, Prior House became a remedial education centre. Since 1985, it has been shared by Brighton Unemployed Centre Families Project, offering education and other social facilities for unemployed people and the Resource Centre, a local organisation formed in 1975 which provides practical resources for community and voluntary groups. The Workers' Educational Association also used part of the building from 1985 until the early 1990s. Architecturally, it is a plain red-brick building with a large stuccoed extension on the second floor, affecting the ambience of Tilbury Place and the neighbouring listed buildings.

The former vicarage of St John the Evangelist's Church, opposite the church on the south side of Carlton Hill, has been converted into an office. It dates from 1899 and is domestic in character, with bay windows containing original sashes, red-brick walls and a steeply pitched roof. It is within the conservation area and is considered to make a "positive contribution" to its character.

Another building formerly associated with the church is the Edward Riley Memorial Hall, now named the Carlton Hill Centre. It has a steep clay-tiled roof and brown brickwork. The high flint walls around it are described as a positive feature of the conservation area, although the building itself has a "neutral effect" according to the council's character statement. The building was used as the church hall until the church closed in 1980; the Chichester Diocesan Centre for the Deaf was then established in it. It is currently the Autism Sussex Day Centre.

=== Listed buildings ===
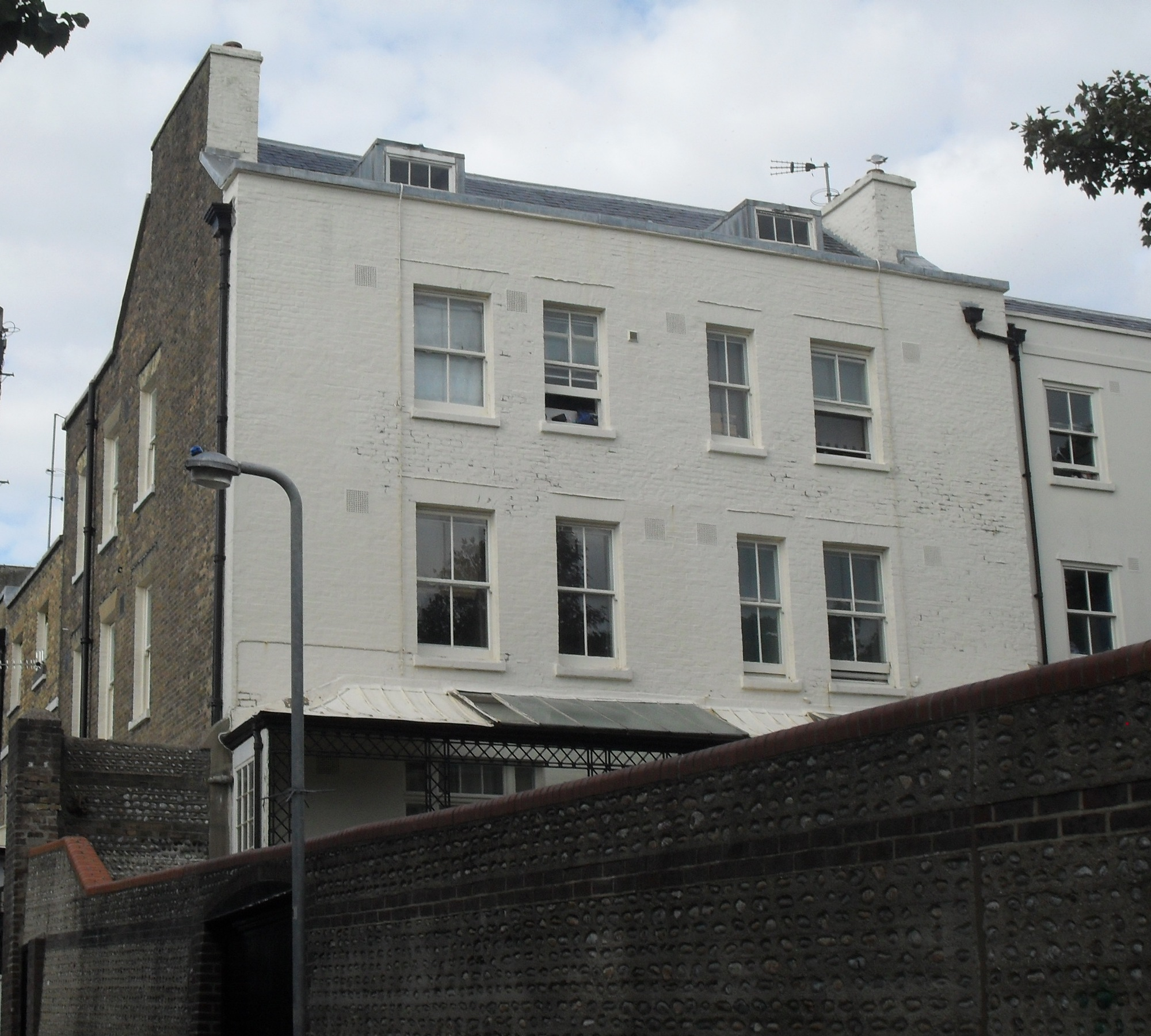
Number 1 Tilbury Place is a Georgian-style townhouse.

A building or structure is defined as "listed" when it is placed on a statutory register of buildings of "special architectural or historic interest" by the Secretary of State for Culture, Media and Sport, a Government department, in accordance with the Planning (Listed Buildings and Conservation Areas) Act 1990. English Heritage, a non-departmental public body, acts as an agency of this department to administer the process and advise the department on relevant issues.

In February 2001, there were 24 listed buildings with Grade I status, 70 Grade II*-listed and 1,124 Grade II-listed buildings in Brighton and Hove. Grade I-listed buildings are defined as being of "exceptional interest" and greater than national importance; Grade II*, the next highest status, is used for "particularly important buildings of more than special interest"; and the lowest grade, Grade II, is used for "nationally important buildings of special interest".

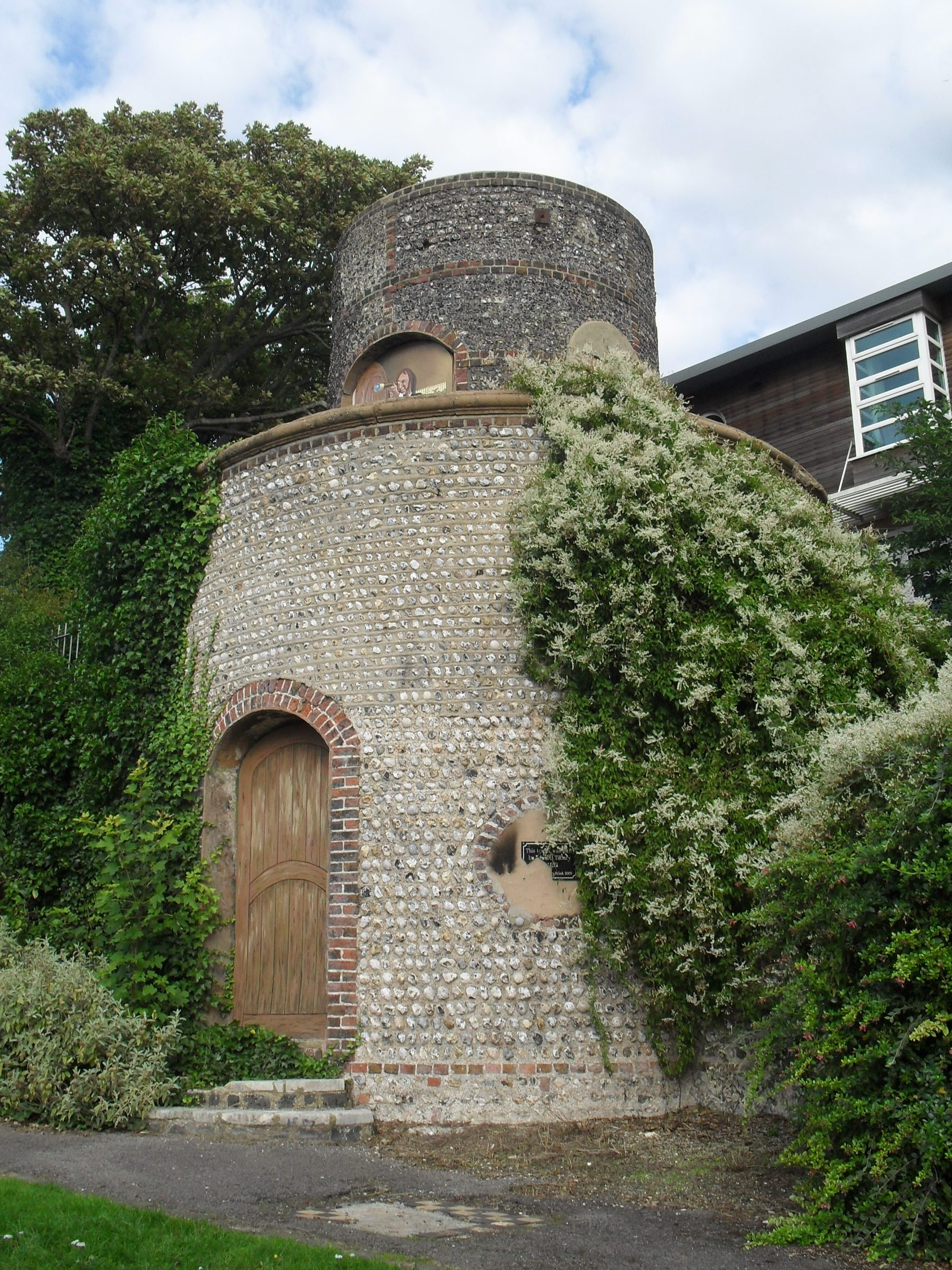
This flint structure in Tarner Park was originally an observation tower.

Carlton Hill has nine listed buildings (covered by five separate listings), all of which have Grade II status and lie within the conservation area. Number 1 Tilbury Place (St John's Lodge) is listed together with its surrounding railings, garden wall and garden porch. The four neighbouring and contemporary houses at 2–5 Tilbury Place are also listed together under a single Grade II designation. Described by the council as an "impressive warm brick terrace" of "elegant townhouses", they were much larger than the surrounding houses—especially number 1, which also had extensive gardens. Number 5 is also slightly larger than the others, and originally had stables adjacent. They are in the Georgian style, built of pale yellow brick laid in the Flemish bond pattern. The roofs are slate-tiled, but some are hidden behind parapets. The entrance doors have decorated fanlights and original windows with ogee-shaped cast-iron miniature balconies. All five houses are now owned by a housing association and have been divided into flats.

The former St John the Evangelist's Church was listed at Grade II on 20 August 1971. It is a Greek Revival-style stucco-clad building of stone and brick with a partly hipped roof. The three-bay façade has four Tuscan pilasters beneath a substantial entablature and pediment. The frieze between them has metopes and triglyphs. Work by L.A. Mackintosh in 1957 altered the exterior; the architect added his personal monogram and an eagle emblem (representing John the Evangelist) above the left and right entrances respectively.

Numbers 34 and 35 Mighell Street (the former Mighell Farmhouse) were jointly listed on 13 October 1952. Described as a "surprising survival", the now semi-detached house is a two-storey cobble-fronted building with a prominent porch framed by Tuscan columns and topped by an entablature with a frieze and triglyph and a decorated pediment. An arched doorway with a keystone has a 19th-century panelled door set into it, and the sash windows are also original and have similar arched surrounds made of bricks. The roof is tiled and has chimneys at each end. The farmhouse's origins are unknown, although a Philip Mighell was a major landowner on Hilly Laine in the late 18th century, when some of the paul-pieces bore his name. The building was apparently at least partly in commercial use by 1865.

In Tarner Park, an area of open space formed from part of number 1 Tilbury Place's grounds, there is a circular tower which is believed to have been built by Edward Tilbury Tarner (son of the original occupants Edward and Laetitia Tarner) as an observation tower so he could see ships in the English Channel. The mid-19th-century structure has two storeys and about 70 steps; the upper level is recessed and has a walkway around it. The walls are of knapped flint with some brick and stonework. Part of an iron weather vane remains at the top. Both storeys have segmental-arched entrances, but these are now closed. The structure is in good condition but has some missing flints.

== Conservation area ==
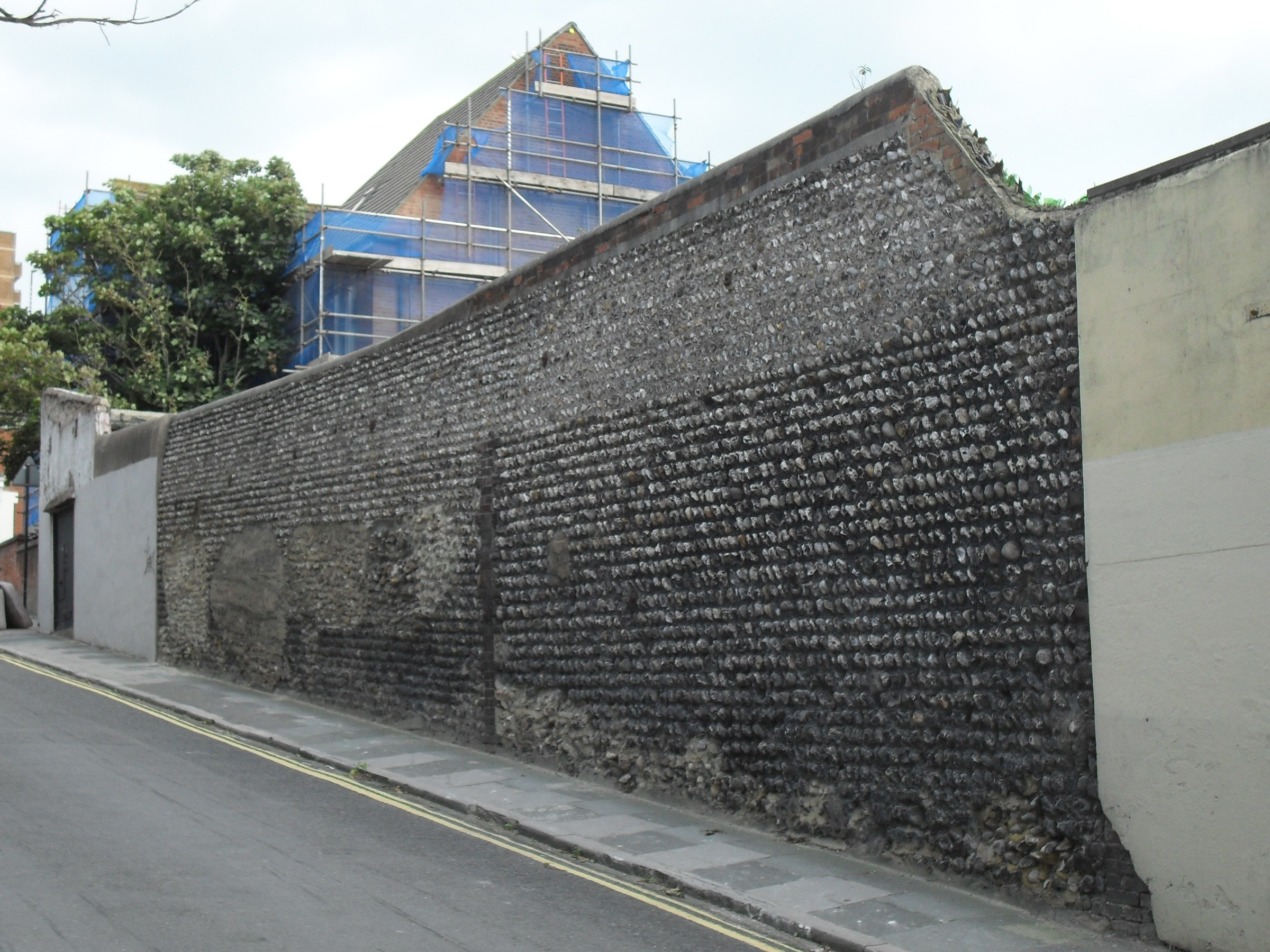
High flint boundary walls characterise the conservation area.

In the United Kingdom, a conservation area is a principally urban area "of special architectural or historic interest, the character or appearance of which it is desirable to preserve or enhance". Such areas are identified by local authorities according to criteria defined by Sections 69 and 70 of the Planning (Listed Buildings and Conservation Areas) Act 1990.

On 4 July 2008, 4.05 acres (1.64 ha) at the heart of Carlton Hill was designated as the city of Brighton and Hove's 34th conservation area. Its boundaries are (clockwise from north) Sussex Street, St John's Place, Carlton Hill (including the stub of Mighell Street) and Tilbury Place, with the open space of Tarner Park at the centre. All of Carlton Hill's listed buildings are within the designated area; these, combined with the sheltered open space of Tarner Park, substantial tree cover, the survival of old street patterns and boundary walls, and the distinctive lie of the land, contribute to the area's "special character", as defined by Brighton and Hove City Council.

The area does not have a unified appearance or structure, owing to the large-scale redevelopment carried out in the 20th century. Instead, a "disparate group of individually interesting buildings" and small spaces define the area; together, they form "a fragment of early 19th-century Brighton".

Flint and brown or yellow brick is used extensively, both for buildings within the conservation area and in associated structures such as boundary walls and pavements. Some kerbs are of granite, limestone and flint, while some high-quality Yorkstone paving slabs survive, along with some red-brick pavements.

== See also ==
- List of conservation areas in Brighton and Hove
- List of demolished places of worship in Brighton and Hove
- List of places of worship in Brighton and Hove
