= Amex House =

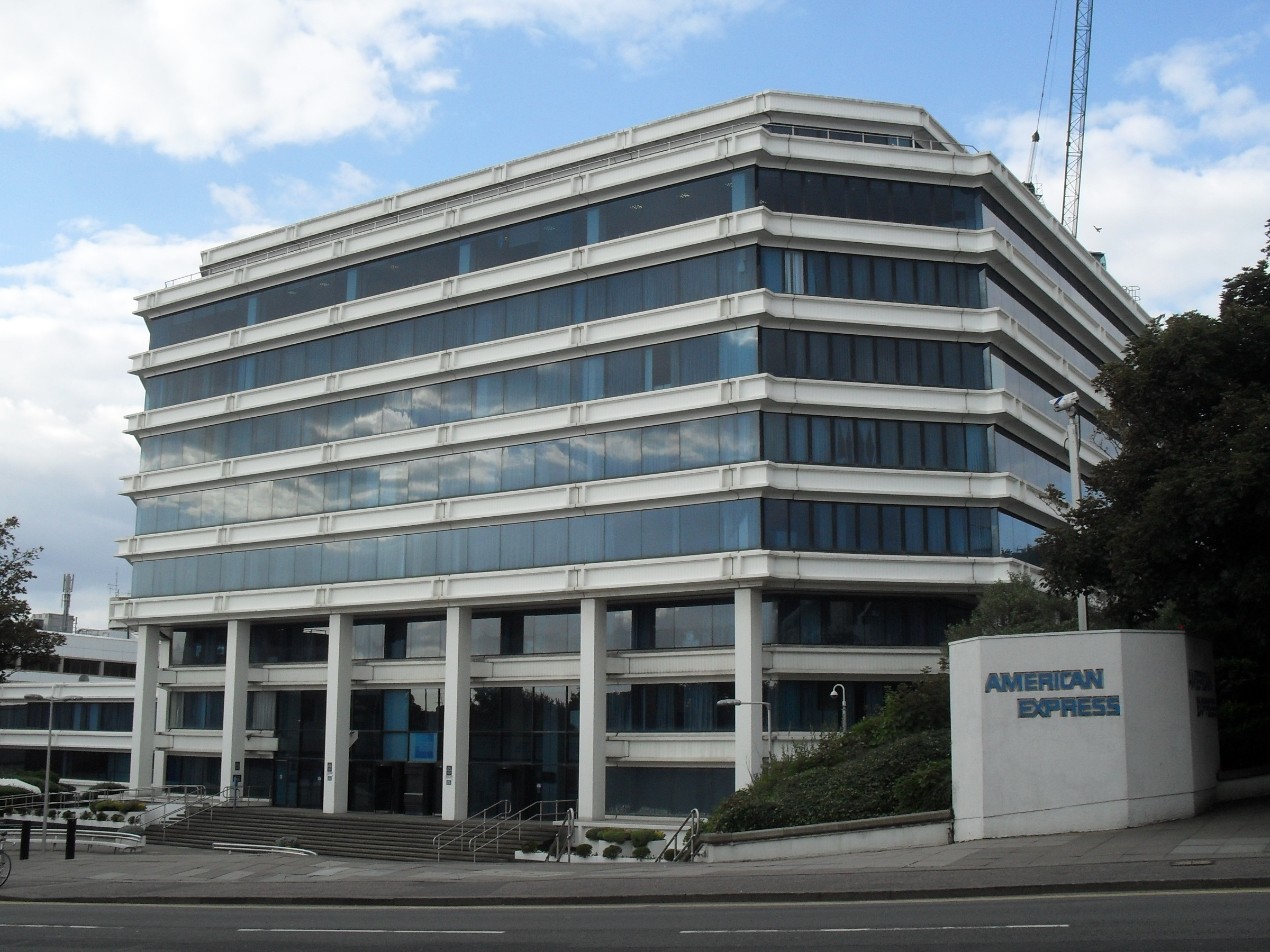
- The building from the southeast, pictured in 2010

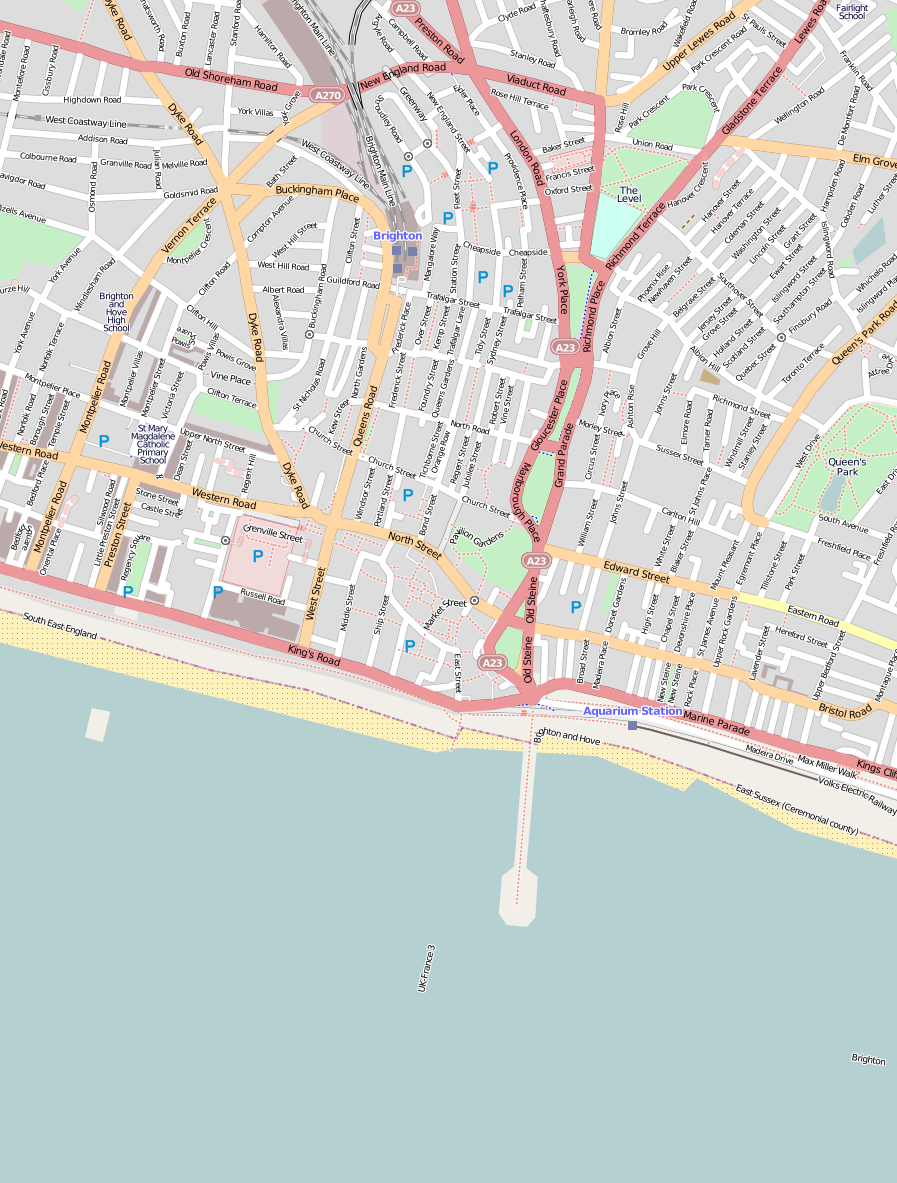
- Location within Brighton

General information
- Type: Corporate headquarters
- Architectural style: Modernist
- Location: Brighton and Hove, Edward Street, Carlton Hill BN88 1AH, Brighton, England
- Coordinates: 50.8230°N 0.1328°W
- Construction started: 1977
- Completed: 1977
- Demolished: 2017
- Cost: £10–15 million
- Owner: American Express Europe Ltd

Height
- Height: 46 m (151 ft)

Dimensions
- Diameter: 300,000 square feet (28,000 m^{2})

Technical details
- Floor count: 9

Design and construction
- Architecture firm: Gollins, Melvin, Ward & Partners

Amex House, popularly nicknamed The Wedding Cake, was the former European headquarters of American Express, a multinational financial services company. Its site is located in the Carlton Hill area of Brighton, part of the English city of Brighton and Hove. The nine-floor building, designed by British architecture firm Gollins, Melvin, Ward & Partners, was commissioned by the company in 1977 to consolidate their operations in Brighton, which had been spread over several sites. The white and blue structure, a landmark on the city skyline, received both praise and criticism for its distinctive style.

Demolition work began in April 2016 after the completion of a new headquarters building on land owned by American Express adjacent to the site. In October 2017 demolition was completed and the site was sold to First Base and Patron Capital, a pan-European institutional investor focused on property backed investments who proposed "a vibrant new mixed-use development including new homes, workspace and importantly, new jobs to revive this area of Brighton".

== History ==
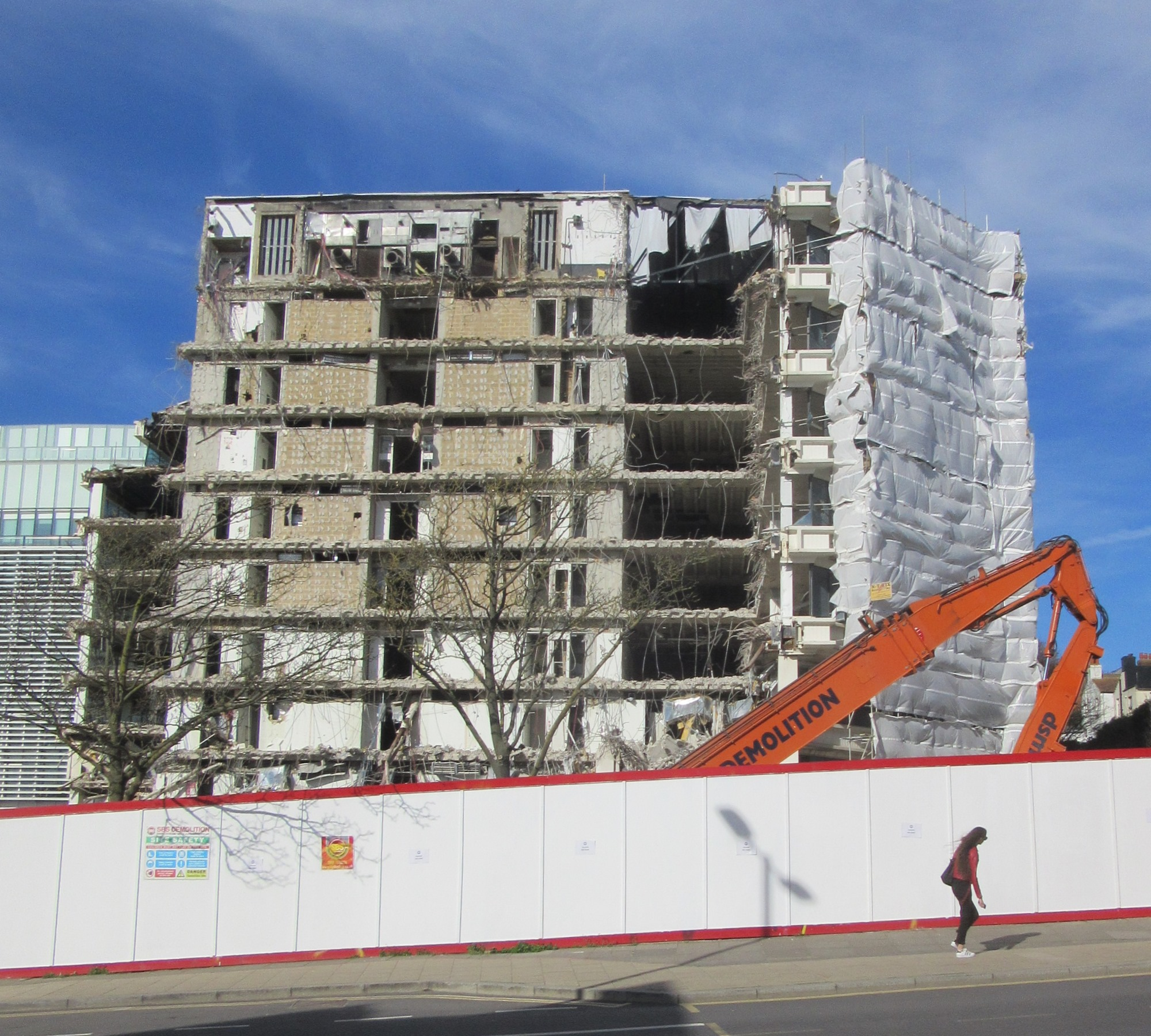
The building being demolished in 2017

Brighton grew rapidly in the 18th and 19th centuries, prompted by its development into a fashionable seaside resort. New residential areas were developed around the core of the old fishing village of Brighthelmston. Rich visitors and residents were housed in set-piece Regency squares and terraces on the seafront, but the large number of poor people attracted to the town from across Sussex and beyond by the prospect of work lived in the smaller terraced streets of new suburbs on the surrounding hillsides. One of these—and the most poverty-stricken and densely populated—was Carlton Hill, an area east of Old Steine and the Royal Pavilion and separated from the higher-class seafront development by Edward Street. This road, leading east towards Kemp Town and Black Rock, was a major shopping area in the 19th and early 20th centuries, but the area declined after World War II and much of the northern side was cleared between the 1950s and the 1970s. Road widening took up some of the released land, but large areas were still available for redevelopment in the 1960s and 1970s.

American Express had a longstanding presence in Brighton and elsewhere in Sussex, and in 1968 they moved their Mechanical Accounting division on to one site—an office building (previously owned by another company) on Edward Street. As the firm's European operations grew, it sought a larger, purpose-built office in which to base its European headquarters. Land between the north side of Edward Street and Carlton Hill's main road (also called Carlton Hill) was available, and American Express acquired it and proposed the construction of a new office block as part of a major redevelopment scheme for the area. British architects Gollins, Melvin, Ward & Partners were commissioned in early 1977 to design the building. It opened on 15 September 1977, at a cost of between £10 million and £15 million, and was the first structure in England to use glass-reinforced plastic (GRP) panels. The office was the base for the corporation's European customer service and card accounting operations. The layered effect of the series of white horizontal lines of GRP panels prompted the popular local nickname "The Wedding Cake".

By 2010, American Express was the largest private-sector employer in the city of Brighton and Hove: about 3,000 people worked in the 300,000-square-foot (28,000 m^{2}) Amex House building. The company was estimated to generate £300 million per year to the city's economy—about 7% of its total value. In the early 21st century, the company considered moving its operations away from Brighton; but in September 2008 it announced plans for a new headquarters building on land behind Amex House, which would eventually replace the 1970s building. The company bought the freehold of the land from Brighton and Hove City Council in May 2009; various conditions were attached, such as a requirement for American Express to stay in Brighton for the long term. Planning permission for the new development was granted on 4 November 2009, with further conditions attached—in particular, American Express would have to give the neighbouring Carlton Hill Primary School £300,000 to compensate for the negative effect the new building would have on its playground, which would be overlooked. EPR Architects Ltd. were awarded the design contract, and the Sir Robert McAlpine company built the new office.

Site clearance work for the new office, which was built on Amex House's car park, began in January 2010. The site is about 375,000 square feet (34,800 m^{2}), and the building has about 200,000 square feet (19,000 m^{2}) of office space. There is an onsite gymnasium, parking for more than 100 cars and better vehicular access from the street. The sloping site means that the building has nine storeys on one side but only five on the opposite side, and there is basement space in addition. External work was completed in September 2012. It was stated in that year that demolition of the now redundant Amex House was expected to happen by 2016. Work to remove internal fittings began in late April 2016, and at the same time hoardings were erected around the exterior in preparation for demolition over the summer of 2016. The demolition concluded one year after that. The demolition contractors were Syd Bishop & Sons Ltd.

The future of the old Amex House site had not been confirmed at the time demolition work started, nor a year later in summer 2017 when the work was largely complete. The Brighton and Hove City Plan proposes 220,000 square feet (20,000 m^{2}) of offices, restaurants, green spaces and some housing, with no building to exceed seven storeys in height. The name "Edward Street Quarter" has been given to the site.

== Architecture ==
The Modernist Amex House was a local landmark, "dominat[ing] the sweep of Carlton Hill" and even (to one architectural historian) evoking Thunderbirds. Its clean lines of contrasting blue-tinted glass and white GRP gave the building an "emphatic horizontality" which was made less harsh by the substantial chamfering of each corner and the set-back top storey. Although the building was large and visually dominant, it was not merely another tower block in an area which was extensively redeveloped with such buildings in the 1960s. It was instead described as "a much more successful addition to Edward Street than its contemporary neighbours", which include the law courts and Brighton's main police station, and "one of the most original of Brighton's modern buildings". Local conservation group The Regency Society criticised its demolition, describing it as "arguably Brighton's best postwar building ... [offering] a splash of style in Edward Street's jumble of mediocrity." Nevertheless, the building was also described as a "major intrusion" on the adjacent Carlton Hill conservation area, "significantly affect[ing] its setting".

== Bibliography ==
- Antram, Nicholas; Morrice, Richard (2008). Brighton and Hove. Pevsner Architectural Guides. London: Yale University Press. ISBN 978-0-300-12661-7.
- Brighton Polytechnic. School of Architecture and Interior Design (1987). A Guide to the Buildings of Brighton. Macclesfield: McMillan Martin. ISBN 1-869865-03-0.
- Collis, Rose (2010). The New Encyclopaedia of Brighton. (based on the original by Tim Carder) (1st ed.). Brighton: Brighton & Hove Libraries. ISBN 978-0-9564664-0-2.
- Elleray, D. Robert (1987). Brighton: a Pictorial History. Chichester: Phillimore & Co. Ltd. ISBN 0-85033-627-9.
- Fines, Ken (2002). A History of Brighton & Hove. Chichester: Phillimore & Co. ISBN 1-86077-231-5.
- Gollins, Melvin, Ward Partnership (1974). Architecture of the Gollins, Melvin, Ward Partnership. Lund Humphries Publishers. ISBN 0-85331-368-7.
