= Greek Orthodox Church of the Holy Trinity, Brighton =

Church of the Holy Trinity
- Greek Orthodox Church of the Holy Trinity
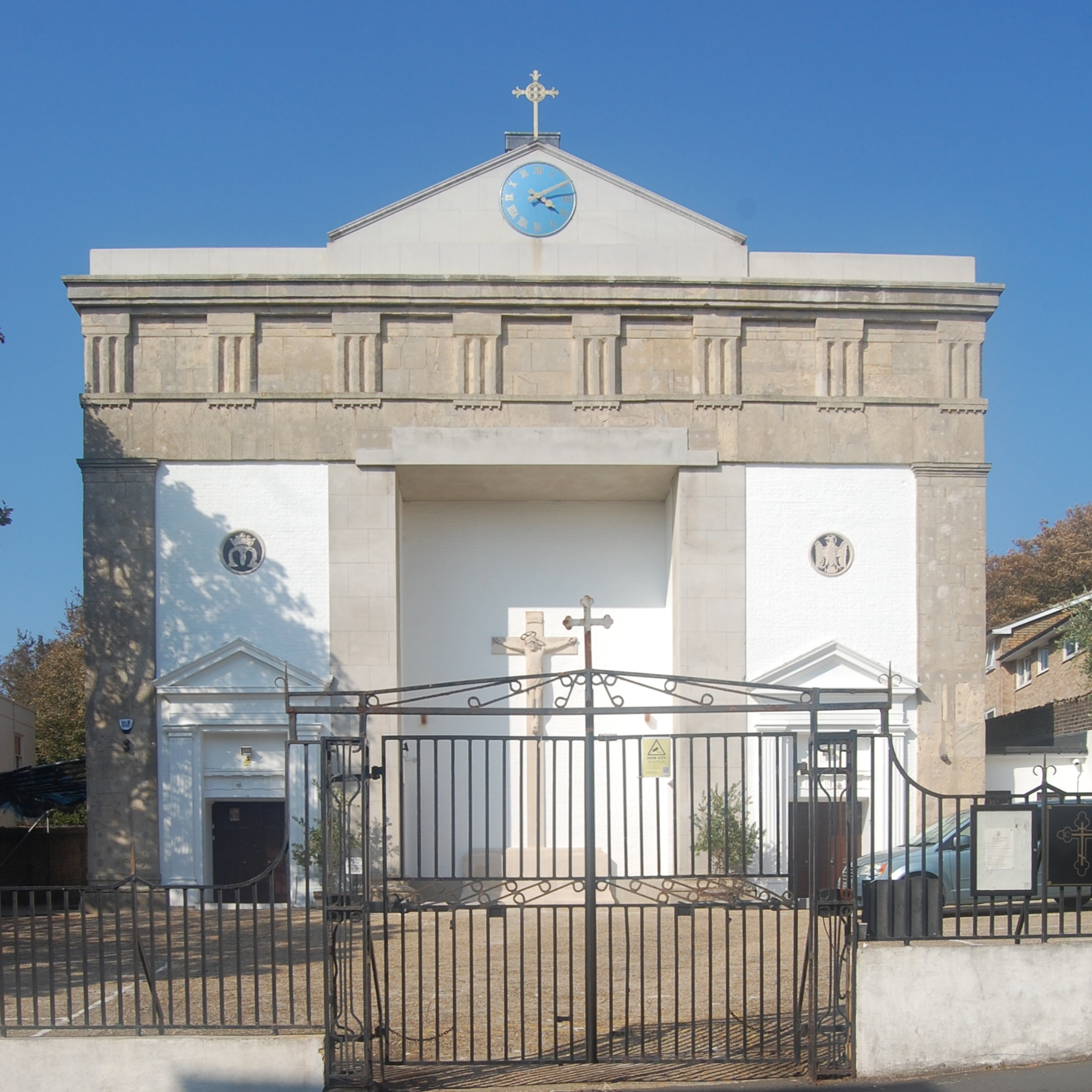
- Church of the Holy Trinity
- 50°49′26″N 0°7′53″W
- Location: Carlton Hill, Brighton, Brighton and Hove BN2 0GW
- Country: England
- Denomination: Greek Orthodox

History
- Former name: St John the Evangelist
- Status: Church
- Founded: 1838
- Founder: Rev. Henry Michell Wagner
- Dedication: John the Evangelist
- Consecrated: 28 January 1840
- Events: Sold to Greek Orthodox community in 1985

Architecture
- Functional status: Active
- Heritage designation: Grade II listed
- Designated: 20 August 1971
- Architect: George Cheesman, Jr.
- Style: Greek Revival
- Construction cost: £4,660 (£410,500 in 2025)
- Closed: 11 November 1980 (as St John the Evangelist)

The Church of the Holy Trinity is a Greek Orthodox church in Brighton, part of the English city of Brighton and Hove. Built in 1838 in one of Brighton's most notorious slum districts, Carlton Hill, it was an Anglican church for most of its life: dedicated to St John the Evangelist, it was used by the Anglican community until it was declared redundant in 1980. After some uncertainty about its future, it was sold to Brighton's Greek Orthodox community in 1985 and has been used as their permanent place of worship since then. Reflecting its architectural and historical importance, it has been listed at Grade II since 1971.

== History ==
Carlton Hill is a long, steep road on high ground known as the East Cliff, north of the Kemp Town development and south of Hanover. Following Brighton's rapid growth in the early 19th century, it became established as one of its most deprived slum areas. Henry Michell Wagner, the Vicar of Brighton from 1824 until his death in 1870, was committed to providing free churches for Brighton's poor people, at a time when pew-rents were standard in Anglican churches. He used his large fortune to build six churches in which most of the seats were free rather than subject to pew-rents. The need for such action was urgent in the early years of his curacy: by 1830 about 18,000 poor people lived in the town, representing nearly half the population, but only 3,000 rent-free pews were available in the existing churches.

St John the Evangelist was the third church built under Wagner's curacy, after All Souls Church in Eastern Road—built between 1833 and 1834, and demolished in 1968—and Christ Church in Montpelier Road (built between 1837 and 1838, and demolished in 1982). The architects and builders of Christ Church, Brighton-based firm Cheesman & Son, were employed again; George Cheesman Jr. was responsible for the design, and his father George Cheesman built it. Unlike its Gothic-inspired predecessor, however, St John the Evangelist was designed in the Classical style. The foundation stone was laid on 15 October 1838. The church cost £4,660 (equivalent to £410,500 in 2025) (including £908 (£80,000 in 2025) for the purchase of the site), and was consecrated on 28 January 1840 by Robert James Carr, a former Vicar of Brighton who had become the Bishop of Worcester. He was visiting Brighton at the time, and stood in for the unwell Bishop of Chichester. More than half of the 1,200 seats were free.

The church always found it difficult to attract a large congregation; reasons claimed for this include its awkward location, the attraction of cheap taverns and gin shops in the area and the controversial introduction of a Ritualist, High church style of worship in the 1860s and 1870s. A further problem was a long and expensive closure in 1879 for structural repairs. It was declared redundant by the Diocese of Chichester on 11 November 1980 and sold to the Greek Orthodox Church on 13 December 1985. Before this, it was announced in June 1982 that one of four bidders for the franchise for Brighton's new commercial radio station wanted to buy the building and convert it into a broadcast studio. The bid, by a company called Southdown Radio and supported by actress Judy Cornwell, was beaten by that of Southern Sound—predecessors of Southern FM.

Since the Greek Orthodox community acquired the building, some interior alterations have been made, including the installation of a new altar screen. It has been licensed for worship in accordance with the Places of Worship Registration Act 1855 and has the registration number 79056.

=== 2010 fire ===
The church was badly damaged by fire in July 2010. In the early afternoon of Sunday 4 July, fire spread from the ground floor through to parts of the roof. There were no casualties. Although there was no structural damage, the entire interior was gutted causing £500,000 worth of damage. The fire is being treated as arson, with a £10,000 reward (funded by public donations) for the conviction of the arsonist.

After initially using a marquee in the grounds of the fire-damaged building, the congregation used St. Michael and All Angels church until restoration work was completed.

== Architecture ==
Built in brick (in a Flemish bond pattern) with some stone dressings, the church has a stuccoed southern frontage, facing Carlton Hill; none of the other elevations are easily visible. A deep central recess is flanked by two prominent wings with entrance doors and large stone pilasters, above which is a pediment with an embedded clock. The large crucifix above the entrance is a recent addition. The Georgian-style front elevation, which was improved in 1957 by L.A. Mackintosh (whose personal monogram is on the wall above the left entrance door), has been described as "strangely bleak".

The frontage is divided into three parts by tall grey pilasters. The left and right bays are further forward than the wider central bay, and have matching entrance: each has a lintel featuring a triglyph and metope pattern, smaller white pilasters and a pediment. Above the left (west) entrance is Mackintosh's crown monogram; above the right is a monogram of an eagle, the symbol of John the Evangelist. A large grey entablature, with prominent triglyph and metope work, sits above the three bays. Over the recessed centre bay is another pediment embedded with a blue clock and topped by a cross.

The church was listed at Grade II by English Heritage on 20 August 1971. It is one of 1,124 Grade II-listed buildings and structures, and 1,218 listed buildings of all grades, in the city of Brighton and Hove.

== See also ==
- Grade II listed buildings in Brighton and Hove: E–H
- List of places of worship in Brighton and Hove
- St Mary and St Abraam Coptic Orthodox Church, Hove

== Bibliography ==
- Brighton Polytechnic. School of Architecture and Interior Design (1987). A Guide to the Buildings of Brighton. Macclesfield: McMillan Martin. ISBN 1-869-86503-0.
- Carder, Timothy (1990). The Encyclopaedia of Brighton. Lewes: East Sussex County Libraries. ISBN 0-86147-315-9.
- Dale, Antony (1989). Brighton Churches. London: Routledge. ISBN 0-415-00863-8.
- Middleton, Judy (2003). The Encyclopaedia of Hove & Portslade. Brighton: Brighton & Hove Libraries.
- Nairn, Ian; Pevsner, Nikolaus (1965). The Buildings of England: Sussex. Harmondsworth: Penguin Books. ISBN 0-14-071028-0.
