= Transport in Brighton and Hove =

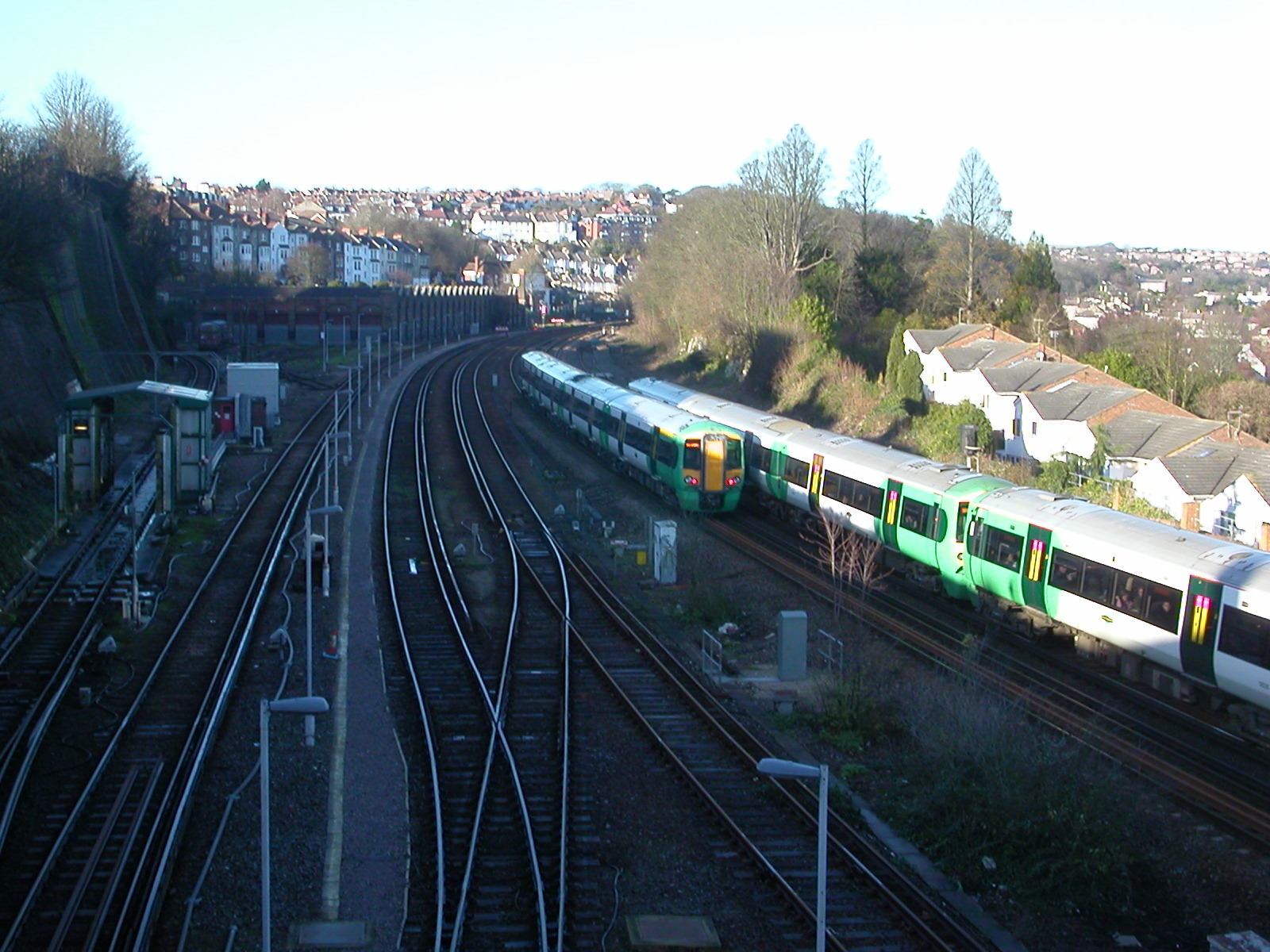
Northbound and southbound Southern trains pass under the Dyke Road Drive over bridge, north of the Montpelier Sidings on the Brighton Main Line.

Public transport in Brighton and Hove, a city on the south coast of England, dates back to 1840. Brighton and Hove has a major railway station, an extensive bus service, many taxis, coach services, and it has previously had trolley buses, ferries, trams, auto rickshaws and hydrofoils.

== Rail ==
Development of rail in Brighton and Hove 1840–1945 (animation)

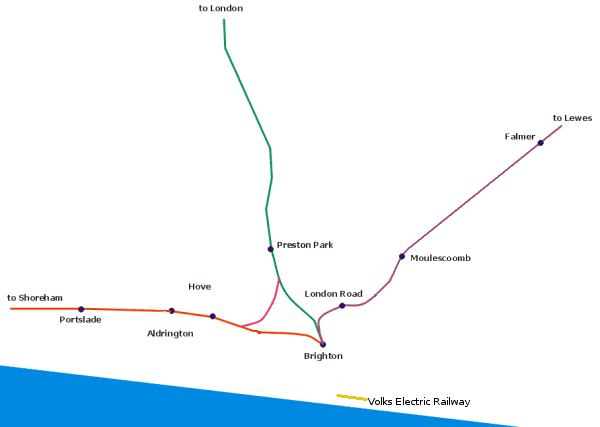
Current commuter rail network in Brighton, with major stations annotated

Brighton railway station is the most important station in Sussex, where lines from the north, west and east terminate. The station opened in 1840 by the London & Brighton Railway, which also established one of the first railway-owned locomotive works (now the New England Quarter).

Govia Thameslink Railway operate regular services to Portsmouth Harbour, Southampton Central, Hastings, Seaford, London Victoria, Bedford and Cambridge under the Gatwick Express, Southern and Thameslink brands. Until 2022, there was also a once a day Great Western Railway service to Great Malvern.

Other railway stations in Brighton and Hove are:

- North of Brighton: Preston Park.
- West of Brighton: Hove; Aldrington; Portslade; Fishersgate (on the boundary with West Sussex).
- East of Brighton: London Road; Moulsecoomb; Falmer.

The express London Victoria service takes 51 minutes, compared with one hour in 1910, 80 minutes in 1859 and up to two hours when the service began in 1841. This route from the original platforms, below the current station, off Trafalgar Street, forms a walkable Greenway through the New England Quarter development and over the 1841 bridge over New England Road.

In addition to the main line to London, trains run to Shoreham-by-Sea (1840) via the West Coastway Line, and Lewes (1846) by the East Coastway Line. The original Hove station (1840–80, Holland Road1905–32) was at the junction of Davigdor, Holland and Cromwell Roads. Hove station opened as Cliftonville in 1865 and was joined to the London main line in 1879 by the Cliftonville tunnel.

Other stations within Brighton, with opening dates, are London Road (1877), between Ditching Rise and Springfield Road at some distance from London Road; Moulsecoomb (1980); and Falmer (1846; moved to its present site nearer Brighton in 1890), all on the East Coastway Line. On the Brighton Main Line, non-express London trains stop at Preston Park (opened as Preston in 1869).

=== Former lines ===
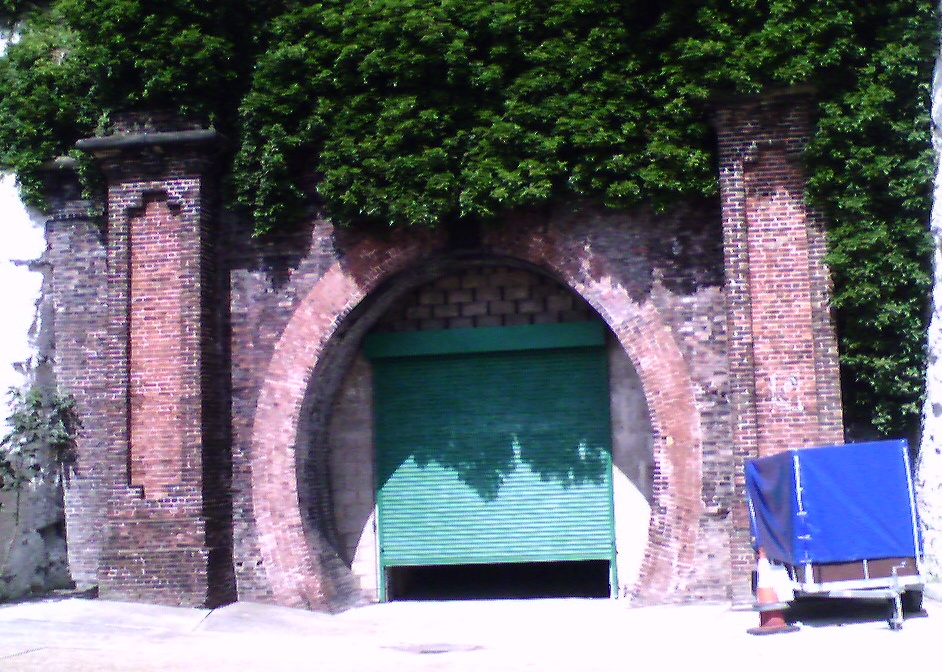
The Kemptown end of the Kemp Town-Elm Grove tunnel

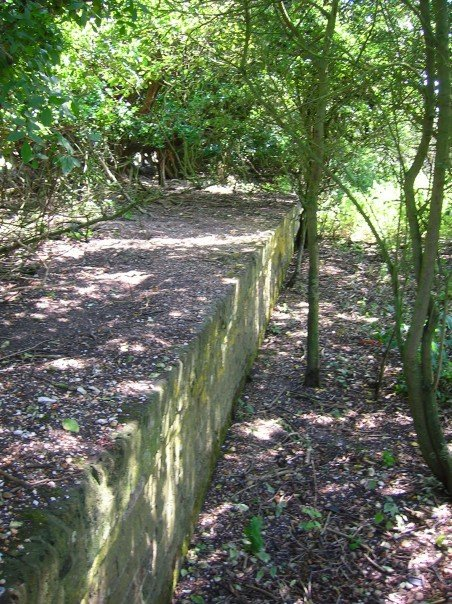
The platforms for the disused Golf Club halt on the Devil's Dyke line

From 1869 until 1932 (and for freight until 1971) there was a line to Kemptown: Lewes Road (actually on Mayo Road 1873–1932), Hartington Road Halt (1906–11) and Kemp Town terminus and goods yard. The line is closed and only the tunnel under Elm Grove remains (visible from the Freshfield Industrial Estate and below Elm Grove Primary School), and the commemorative locomotive sculpture on the Bingo Hall on Eastern Road (corner of Park Street). The Hughes Road Industrial Estate, Freshfield Industrial Estate, Enterprise Point and Bonchurch Road Park now occupy the alignment, and the bricks from (and alignment of) the Lewes Road viaduct were reused for the Sainsbury's store at the Vogue Gyratory, which has retained a viaduct theme.

There was a branch line from Aldrington(then Dyke Junction), to Devil's Dyke (view map) between 1887 and 1939 and the track is now a footpath and cycle track north of the Hangleton estate as far as the clubhouse of the Devil's Dyke golf-course. Briefly at the beginning of the 20th century a steep grade funicular railway ran from the bottom of the dyke and a cable car spanned the space above it. Remnants of the concrete piers used to support the cable car are visible on opposite sides of the dyke. There were also Rowan Halt near Rowan Avenue in 1932–38 and Golf Club Halt on the city boundary.

=== Volk's ===
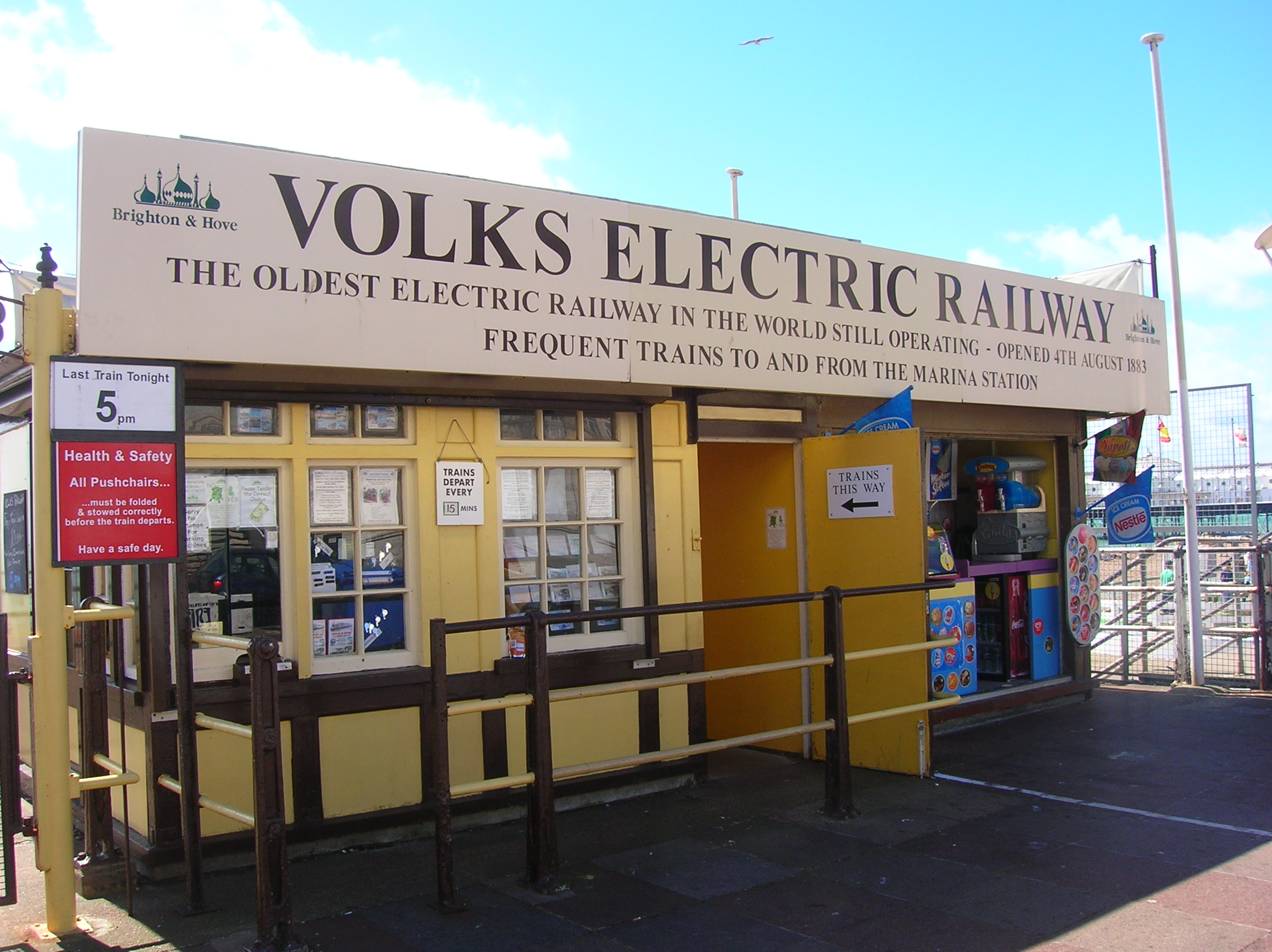
Aquarium Station on the Volk's Electric Railway

The Volk's Electric Railway, opened in 1883, runs along the inland edge of the beach from the Palace Pier to Black Rock. It is the world's oldest operating electric railway.

Between 1894 and 1901 there was another electric railway, also created by Magnus Volk: the 'daddy long-legs' used tracks in the sea, avoiding the need to build a viaduct. The carriage had tall iron legs and carried the passengers above the waves, running between specially constructed piers at the Banjo Groyne and Rottingdean. It was never able to withstand stormy weather, and after several collapses and reconstructions, and final insurmountable problem of changes to the sea defences, it was abandoned. Remnants of its concrete foundations can sometimes be seen along the route at low tide between the Marina and Rottingdean. The Volks is currently enjoying a £1.5 million restoration and rebuild of its stations and depot. expected to be completed early 2018.

== Buses ==
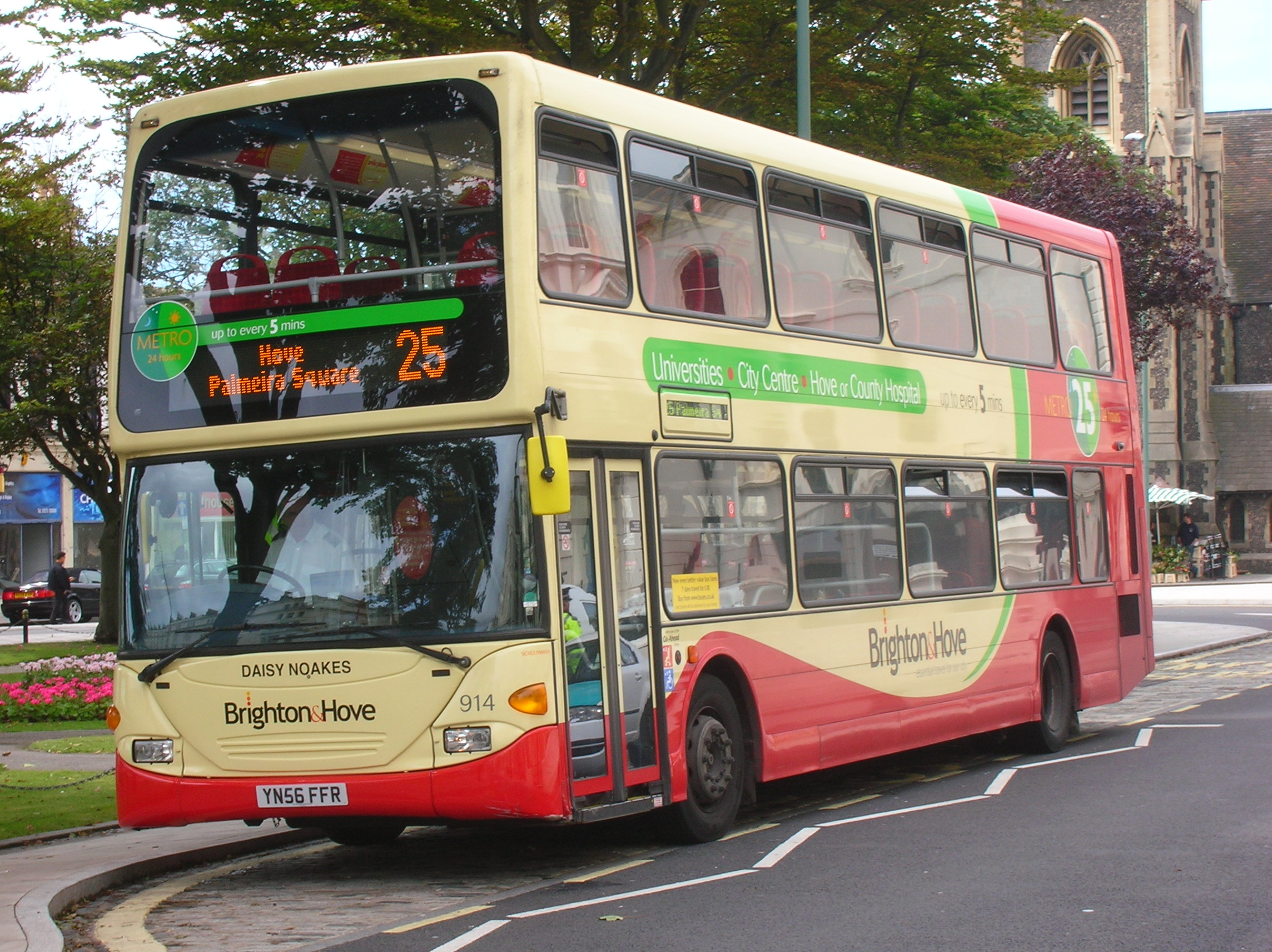
Bus "Daisy Nokes" at Palmeira Square

Most bus services inside the city are operated by Brighton & Hove which has been a subsidiary of the Go-Ahead Group since November 1993 alongside sister company Metrobus which has also been a subsidiary of the Go-Ahead Group since September 1999. Bus services are also operated by Stagecoach South operating the main service called the Coastliner 700. Other services are operated by The Big Lemon which runs its buses on waste cooking oils and batteries with the other small operator being Compass Travel which also took over the bus services from The Sussex Bus in October 2016.

== Taxis ==
The city is served by many taxis, operated by companies and individual drivers. Hackney carriages that passengers may hail on the street are painted in a standard white and aquamarine livery. The unified scheme for Brighton and Hove taxis pre-dates the conjoining of the two towns into one city. The major taxi ranks are in East Street in the Lanes, at the Level in central Brighton, at Brunswick Place in Hove, and at both main railway stations.

== Coaches ==
National Express operates coach services from Pool Valley coach station, near the Palace Pier. Facilities include a bus shelter and two benches. Coaches operate to London Victoria, Gatwick Airport, Eastbourne, Helston, Southampton, Exeter, Plymouth, Heathrow Airport and Stansted Airport.

London General also operate services 775 and 773 from Kingston-Upon-Thames and Sutton Green (Sutton Bus Garage) to Brighton Pier and Eastbourne.

== Car Club Rental ==
Two Car clubs operate in Brighton & Hove: Enterprise Rent-A-Car and Electric Brighton CarShare Ltd.

== Auto rickshaws ==
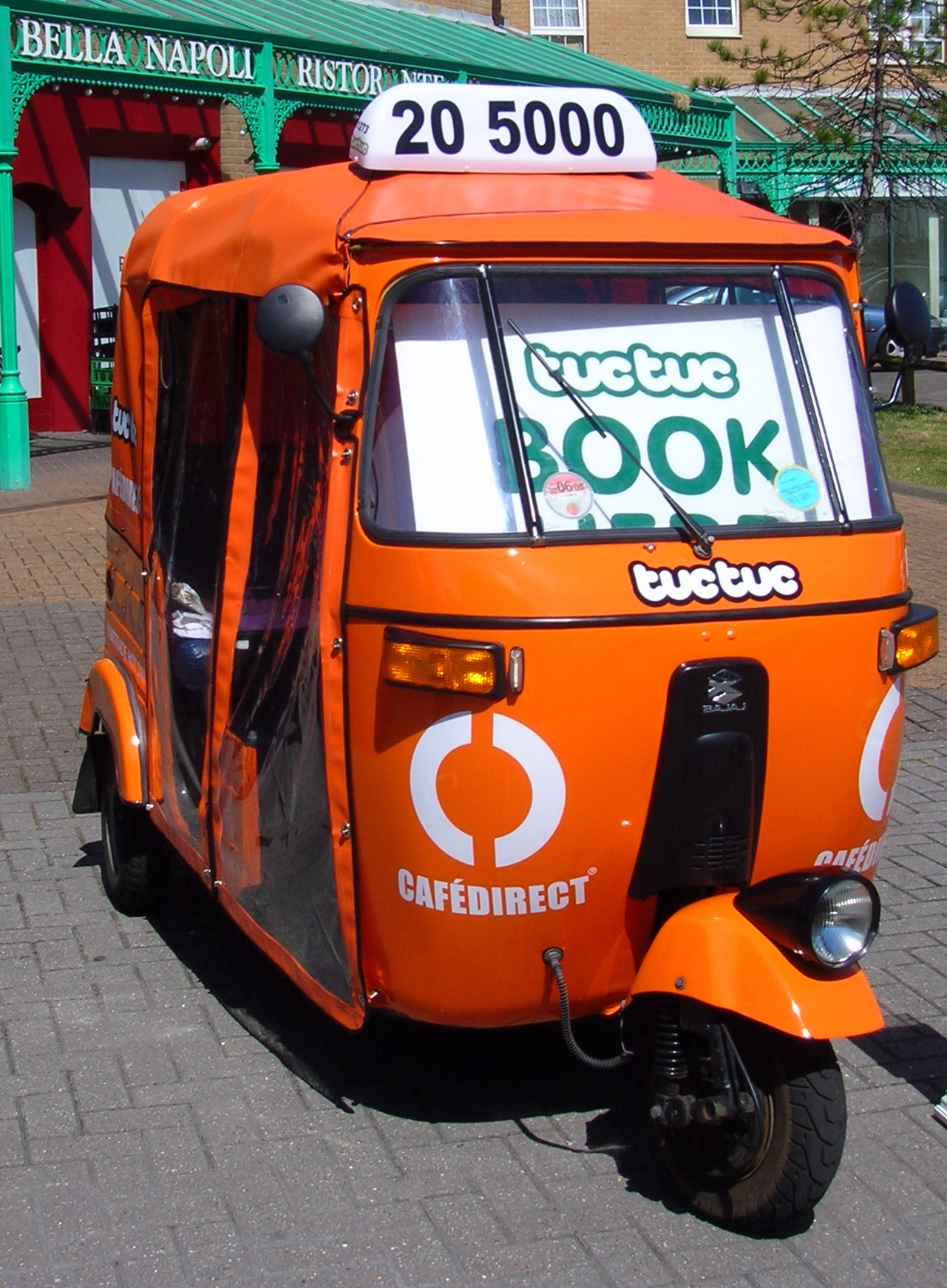
"tuc tuc" auto rickshaw in Brighton Marina

From 2006 to 2007 a network of auto rickshaws was operated by Tuctuc Ltd. They operated like a bus service, following set routes and picking up at dedicated stops, with a "dial-a-ride" taxi-like option. The routes ran from Brighton Marina to Hove Town Hall via Brighton railway station. The auto rickshaws came in two sizes, were painted in distinct styles, and were powered by compressed natural gas.

== Trams ==
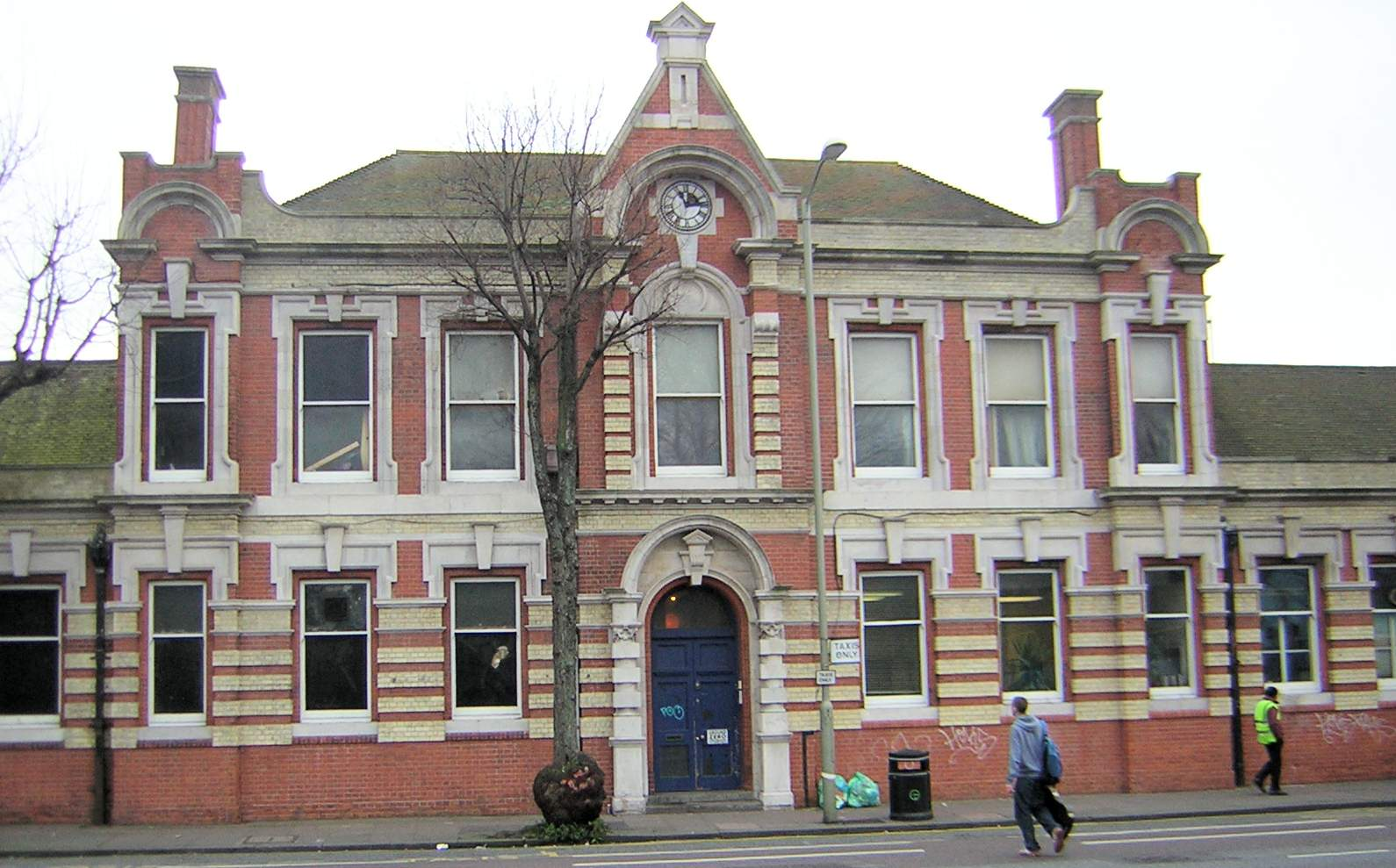
former Brighton Corporation Tramways headquarters, Lewes Road

The first tramway was the 'Brighton and Shoreham Tramways, which at its fullest extent ran from a terminus in Southdown Road, Shoreham to Westbourne Villas in Hove, on the former boundary between Hove and Portslade. The tramway never penetrated Hove, although a connecting horse-drawn omnibus (route 112, operated by the Brighton and Preston United Omnibus Company) ran from the Westbourne Villas terminus. Construction took place in 1883 and 1884; the route was opened throughout on 3 July 1884, initially with steam-driven trams. After this proved unsuccessful, other methods of propulsion were tried (including, in 1887, an early battery-powered locomotive) until horse power took over in 1893. The British Electric Traction company took over the operations in 1898, but was unable to agree with any of the local authorities on a strategy for electrification. The tramway was therefore horse-drawn until the end, on 6 June 1913.

Brighton Corporation Tramways operated an extensive network of routes in the first four decades of the 20th century. The first route, from 25 November 1901, ran from the main terminus at the Aquarium (outside Brighton Pier) to Lewes Road, a major route to the north-east; other routes were quickly established, so that by 1904 its full extent had been established.

== Cycle transport ==
Brighton and Hove has an expanding cycle network. In January 2020, the city council announced that it was exploring the feasibility of making the city centre car-free by 2023. Brighton has two major routes that are part of the Sustrans National Cycle Network: route 2 along the south coast, and route 20 to London (though curtailed to Pyecombe by Sustrans since 2020). Sustrans has also signed regional routes 90 (to Lewes – soon to reach Polegate) and 82 (Hove seafront to Devil's Dyke) within the city. During the 2020 COVID pandemic the city council introduced the following measures to improve cycling in the city: repurposing one of the two lanes in each direction on the Old Shoreham Road (A270) effectively creating an extension of route 90; repurposing one of the westbound lanes of the A259 along the seafront to double the capacity of the busiest route in the city (route 2); closing North Laine to motor vehicles; and improving cycle infrastructure along NCN Route 20.

A bicycle-sharing system, BTN BikeShare, was set up in September 2017 at a cost of £1.45 million, with users able to hire bicycles by the minute or purchase annual membership. There are 49 docking stations around the city and 450 bicycles. Statistics from the first six months of operation showed that 120,000 journeys had been made and 22,000 people had used the scheme, making it the second most popular in Britain after the Santander Cycles system in London.

== Sea ==
There was a short-lived catamaran ferry in the 1990s to Fécamp in Normandy across the Channel.

A daily ferry service to Dieppe by DFDS Seaways serves the port of Newhaven.

Volk's Electric Railway opened the "Daddy Long-Legs" railway (a train above the sea) in 1896, but it was abandoned due to its vulnerability to the sea in the early 1900s.
