= AGT =

AGT may refer to:

== Arts and entertainment ==
- A Global Threat, an American street punk band (1997–2007)
- Adventure Game Toolkit, a 1987 text-based gaming system
- America's Got Talent, an NBC reality TV show
- Australia's Got Talent, a Seven Network reality TV show

== Biology and medicine ==
- Agaritine, a hydrazine derivative
- AGT, a codon for the amino acid Serine
- Angiotensinogen, a protein
- Antiglobulin test, also known as Coombs test
- O-6-methylguanine-DNA methyltransferase, a protein

== Government ==
- Alberta Government Telephones, a Canadian public utility (1906–1991)
- Attorney General of Tanzania
- Attorney-General of Tasmania
- Attorney General of Texas
- Attorney General of Tonga
- Basej-e Milli, additionally referred to as the Afghanistan Green Trend

== Places ==
- Aldrington railway station, Sussex, England (CRS code: AGT)
- Guaraní International Airport, Paraguay (IATA code: AGT)
- AGT Tower, Edmonton, Alberta, Canada

== Vehicular technologies ==
- Automated guideway transit, a driverless rail system
- Honeywell AGT1500, a gas turbine engine—oft used in military tanks

== Other uses ==
- Advanced Global Trading, a Dubai firm
- Central Cagayan Agta language of the Philippines (by ISO code)
- Dries van Agt, Dutch Prime Minister 1977–1982

== See also ==
- Agta (disambiguation)
