= Agata =

Agata may refer to:

- AGATA (organization), a Lithuanian non-profit performing rights organization

== Name ==
- Agata (given name)
- Agata (surname)

== Places ==
- Agata Station, a train station in Ashikaga, Tochigi Prefecture, Japan

== Physics ==
- AGATA (gamma-ray detector), Advanced GAmma Tracking Array

== Miscellaneous ==
- Agata (dog), a Colombian drug-detection dog
- 7366 Agata, a main belt asteroid discovered in 1996
- Agata potato, a potato variety
- Histria Agata, a floating storage and offloading unit
