= Laboratori Nazionali di Legnaro =

Research center

- Nickname: LNL
- Established: 1960
- Research type: Nuclear physics, nuclear astrophysics, applied physics, accelerator physics
- Director: Faiçal Azaïez
- Location: Legnaro, Padua, Italy; 45°21′11.8″N 11°57′2″E
- Operating agency: INFN
- Website: www.lnl.infn.it

The Laboratori Nazionali di Legnaro (Legnaro National Laboratories, LNL) is one of the four major research centers of the Italian National Institute for Nuclear Physics (INFN). The primary focus of research at this laboratory is in the fields of nuclear physics and nuclear astrophysics, where five accelerators are currently used. It is one of the most important facilities in Italy for research in these fields. The main future project of the laboratory is the Selective Production of Exotic Species (SPES), in which various radionuclides will be produced for research and medicinal purposes.

== History ==
The establishment of a laboratory in Legnaro was first suggested in 1956 to promote nuclear physics research in Italy, in addition to previous work in particle physics. In 1959, the University of Padua decided that a new laboratory would be built near Legnaro, rather than installing new equipment in older facilities. The laboratory was founded in 1960 by physicist Antonio Rostagni and research commenced within the next year. After initial investigations demonstrated the conceived role of the Legnaro Laboratories in nuclear physics research, the facility became integrated into the INFN in 1968.

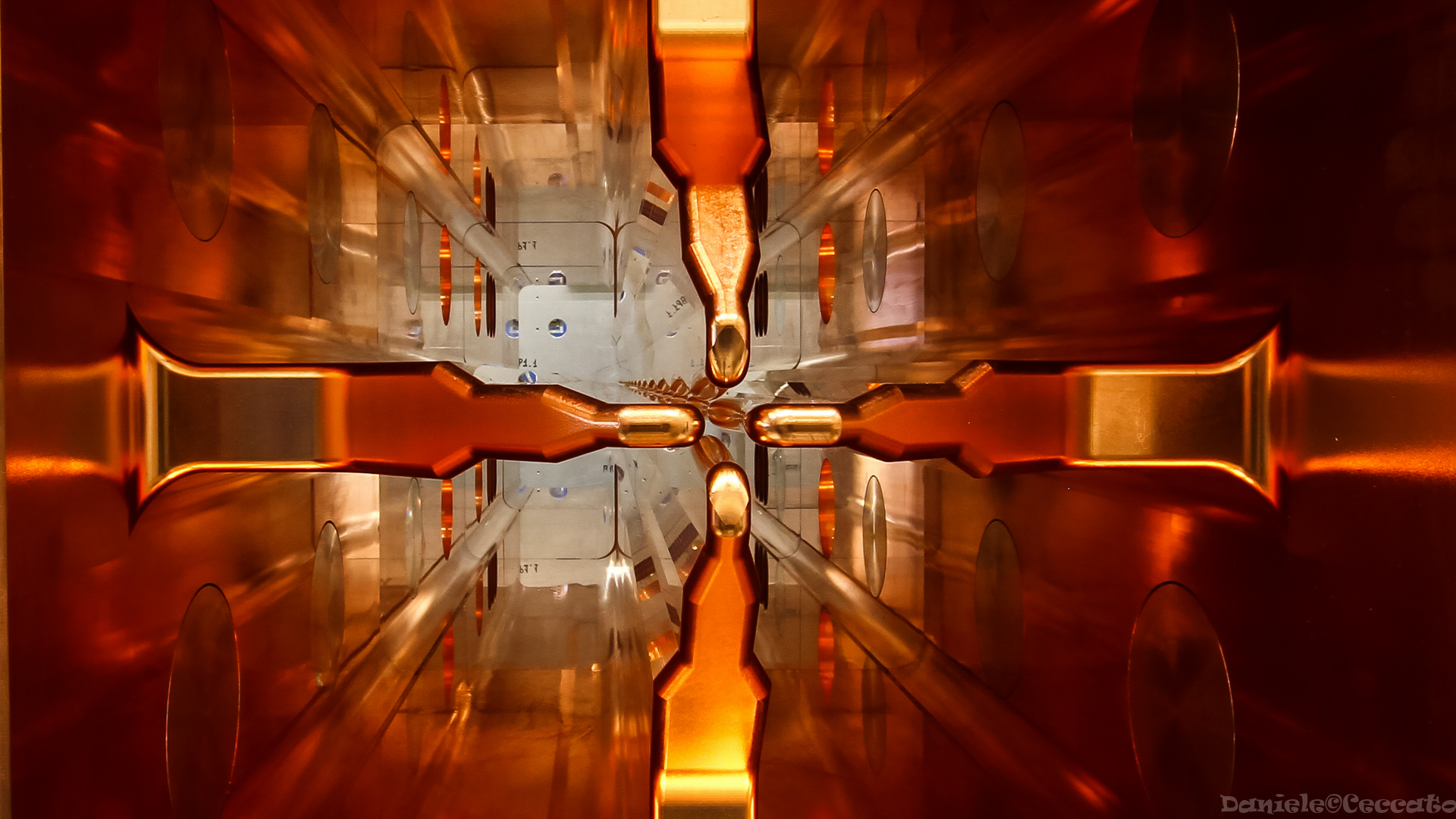
Resonant accelerating cavity (RFQ) at Legnaro National Laboratories.

In subsequent years, several accelerators were newly installed or upgraded. The original CN accelerator, whose operations commenced with the opening of the laboratory, was upgraded to allow the use and study of heavier ions. More advanced facilities were installed in the next decades: the XTU Tandem accelerator in 1981 (inaugurated in 1982) and the Linear Superconducting Accelerator (ALPI) in 1991. The installation of new facilities enabled more advanced studies to be performed at the Legnaro laboratories, increasing their importance in international research in nuclear physics.

Currently, most work at the Legnaro National Laboratories involves studies of nuclear structure, nuclear reactions, and gamma-ray spectroscopy; the last was internationally recognized in the 1990s. The recent focus of the Legnaro Laboratories, and the main future project, is SPES (Selective Production of Exotic Species). A new accelerator for the production of radioactive ion beams has been under construction since 2007, and the alpha phase of the project, featuring a new cyclotron, was inaugurated in December 2016. Subsequent beta, gamma, and delta phases are planned, approved, and funded by INFN and the Italian government; it will be possible to synthesize new isotopes and mass produce medically useful isotopes once they are completed.

== Facilities and projects ==
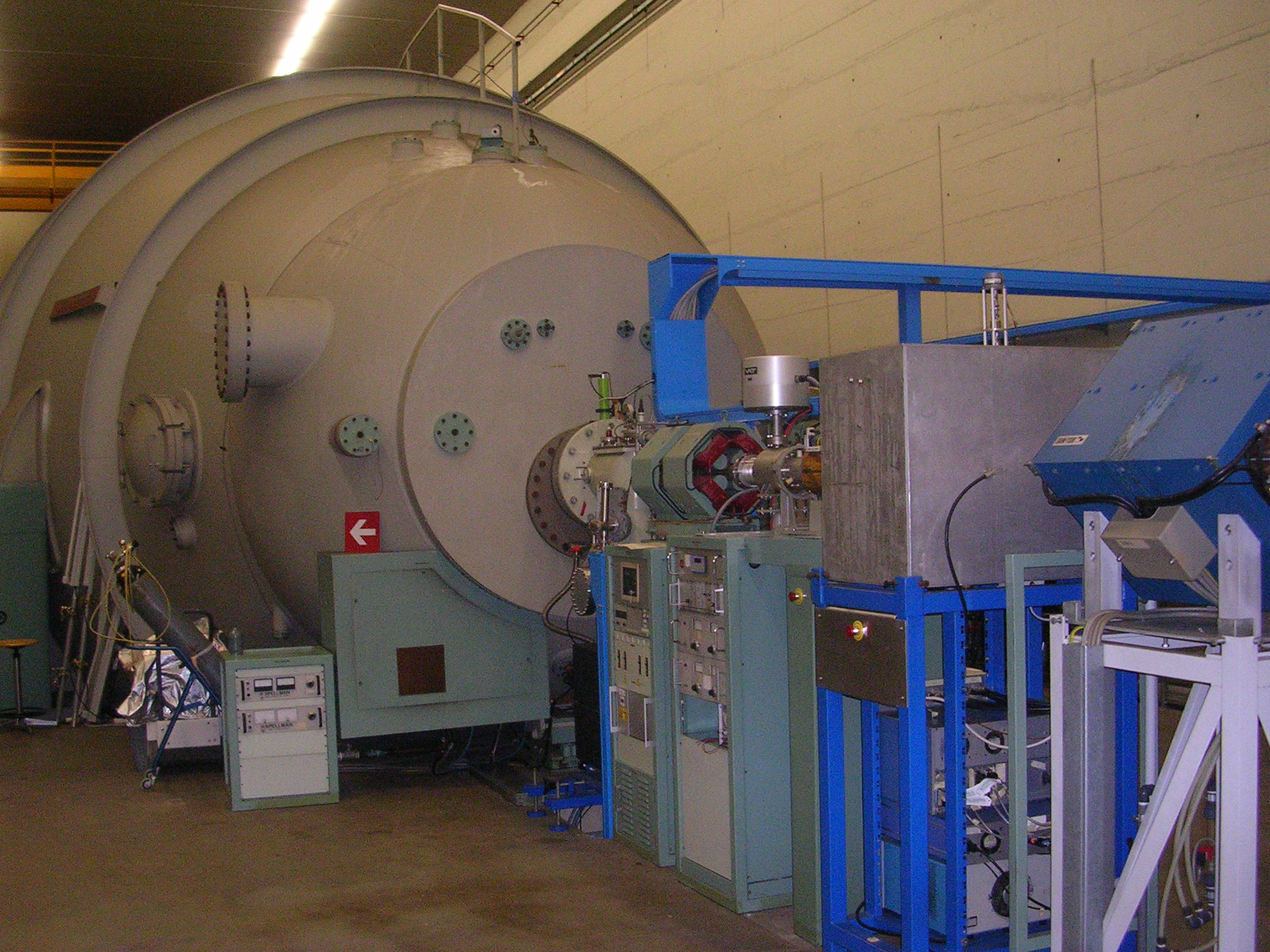
The XTU Tandem accelerator at Legnaro National Laboratories

=== Accelerators ===
There are six accelerators in operation at the Legnaro National Laboratories:

- CN: installed in 1961. The maximum energy reached for beams was 7 MeV, but nowadays runs at 5.57 MeV energy. 7-meter-tall (vertically installed) electrostatic accelerator.
- AN 2000: installed in 1971, 2 MeV beams. Electrostatic accelerator.
- XTU-TANDEM (or TANDEM-XTU): inaugurated 1982. Beam energies up to a few hundred MeV. Electrostatic accelerator.
- ALPI (Acceleratore Lineare Per Ioni, Linear Superconducting Accelerator): Started operation in 1991. A superconducting cryogenic linear accelerator. Boosts beams from the TANDEM-XTU and PIAVE accelerators.
- PIAVE (Positive Ion Accelerator for Very Low velocity ions): Entered operation in late 2014. Superconducting linear accelerator used as an injector to ALPI. A few meters in length.
- P70 cyclotron: inaugurated 2 December 2016. Part of the SPES project.

All accelerators are used to accelerate various ions for nuclear physics purposes.

=== AURIGA ===
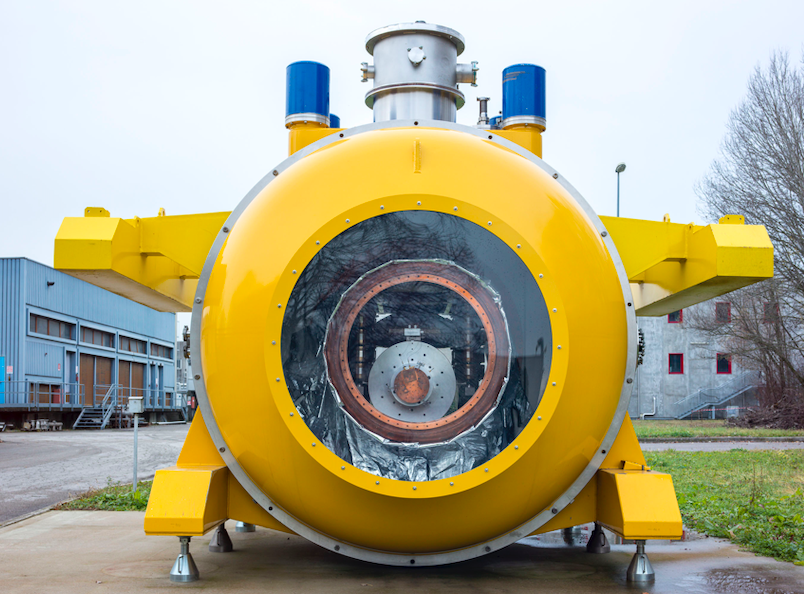
Auriga antenna exposed inside Legnaro National laboratories.

The Legnaro National Laboratories are the site of AURIGA, a gravitational wave detector for astrophysical gravitational waves research. It became operational in 2004, and has been continuously in operation since then. In 2016, it was proven that the AURIGA resonant mass detector is sufficiently sensitive for dark matter searches, and perhaps more suitable than more modern detectors such as LIGO. The experiment is closed and the AURIGA antenna is an exhibit at LNL (since April 2021).

=== SPES ===
The SPES (Selective Production of Exotic Species) project involves the construction of several new accelerators specially designed for the production of radioisotopes. In the beta phase, fission at 10^{13} fissions per second and fragmentation of uranium will be studied to yield exotic neutron-rich isotopes and produce beams with these isotopes at higher intensities than those currently available. These include nuclei near the nuclear drip lines and shell closures that play an important role in the astrophysical r-process. A variety of medically useful radioisotopes will also be mass produced as part of the project's gamma phase. By 2017, significant progress was made on the construction of the SPES facility; the first beams of exotic isotopes are expected to be available in late 2019.

=== Gamma-ray spectroscopy ===
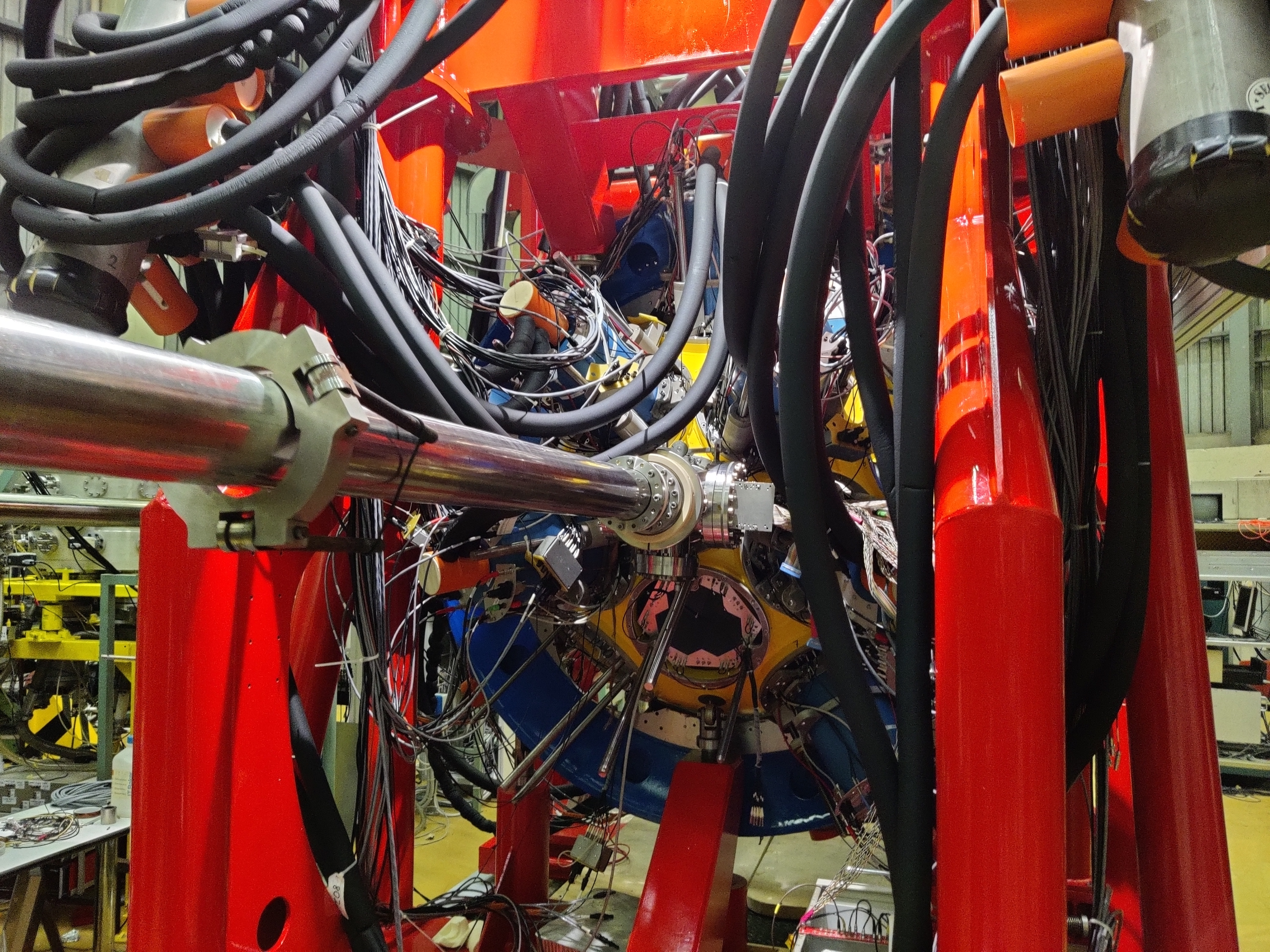
GALILEO HPGe system for gamma-ray spectroscopy, installed in the 2nd experimental hall of the Tandem - Alpi - Piave accelerator complex at Legnaro National Laboratories.

Experiments using gamma-ray spectroscopy are underway at several European laboratories including the Legnaro National Laboratories. They address the structure of atomic nuclei, as well as their unbound states and roles in nucleosynthesis processes. At present, LNL delivers stable ion beams, but with the development of SPES high-intensity radioactive ion beams will also be available.

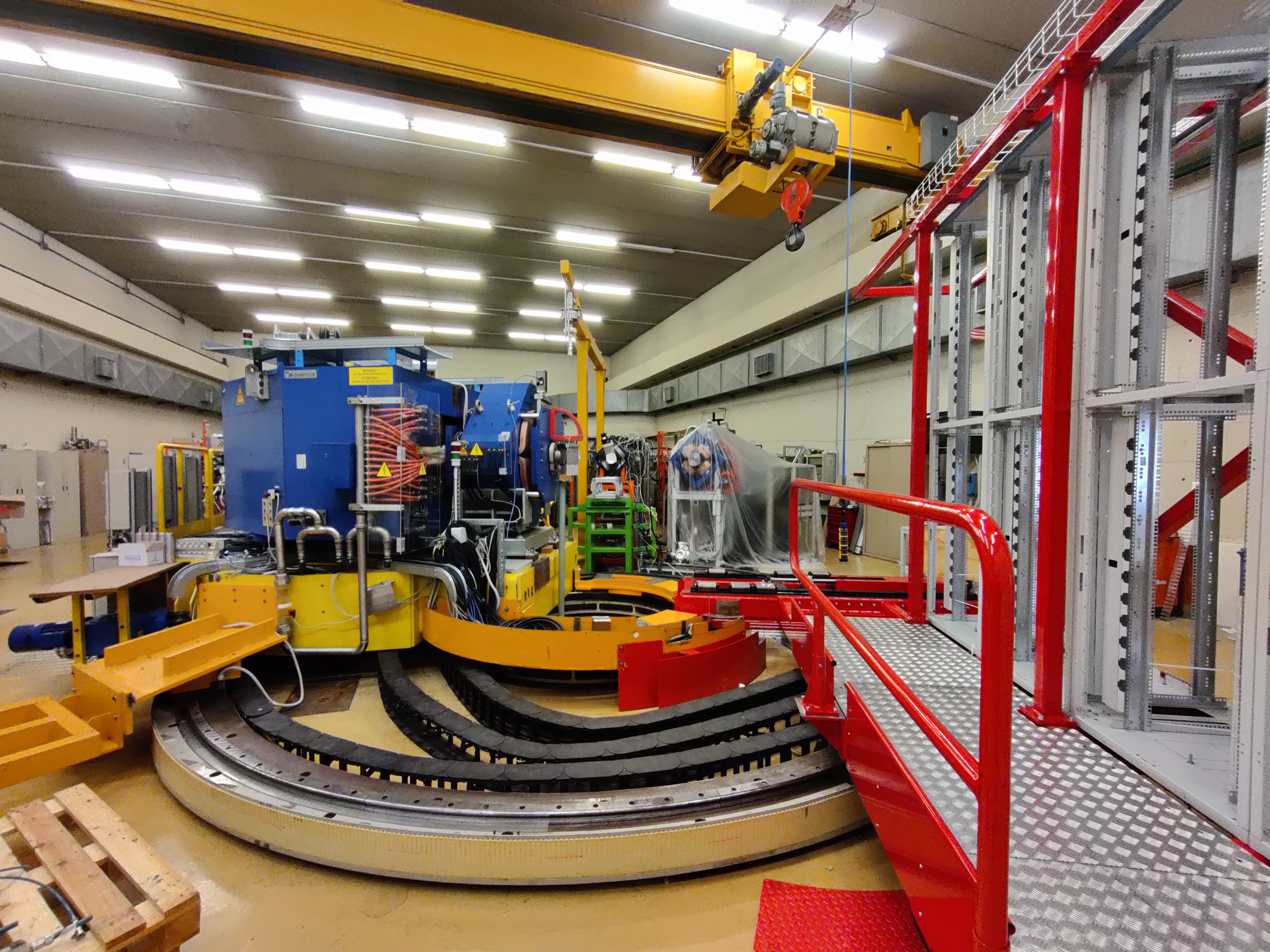
PRISMA magnetic spectrometer at experimental hall n.1, Tandem-ALPI-PIAVE accelerator complex. On the right, the first elements for the AGATA system installation.

The major apparatus installed in the laboratories includes PRISMA (heavy ion magnetic spectrometer, with trajectory reconstruction system), GALILEO (Hyper pure Germanium gamma-ray detector system, that can be complemented by scintillator detectors) and EXOTIC (a device for light exotic beam production and study).

Since 2021, the travelling European AGATA (Advanced Gamma Tracking Array) spectrometer is installed at the Tandem-Alpi-Piave complex. It is currently coupled to the PRISMA magnetic spectrometer. In the future, thanks to the new beam interconnection between the Tandem-Alpi-Piave complex and the SPES project, the AGATA system will receive exotic beams produced by the SPES facility.

== See also ==
- Laboratori Nazionali del Gran Sasso
- Laboratori Nazionali di Frascati
