= Agta (disambiguation) =

Agta may refer to:

- Agta language of the Philippine island of Luzon
- Agta people, of the Philippines
- Kapre, a legendary creature of the Philippines
- Balay sa Agta (House of the Agta), a cave and tourist attraction in the southeastern town of Argao, Cebu, Philippines

== See also ==
- Agt (disambiguation)
- Agata (disambiguation)
