= Anne Laughlin =

American novelist

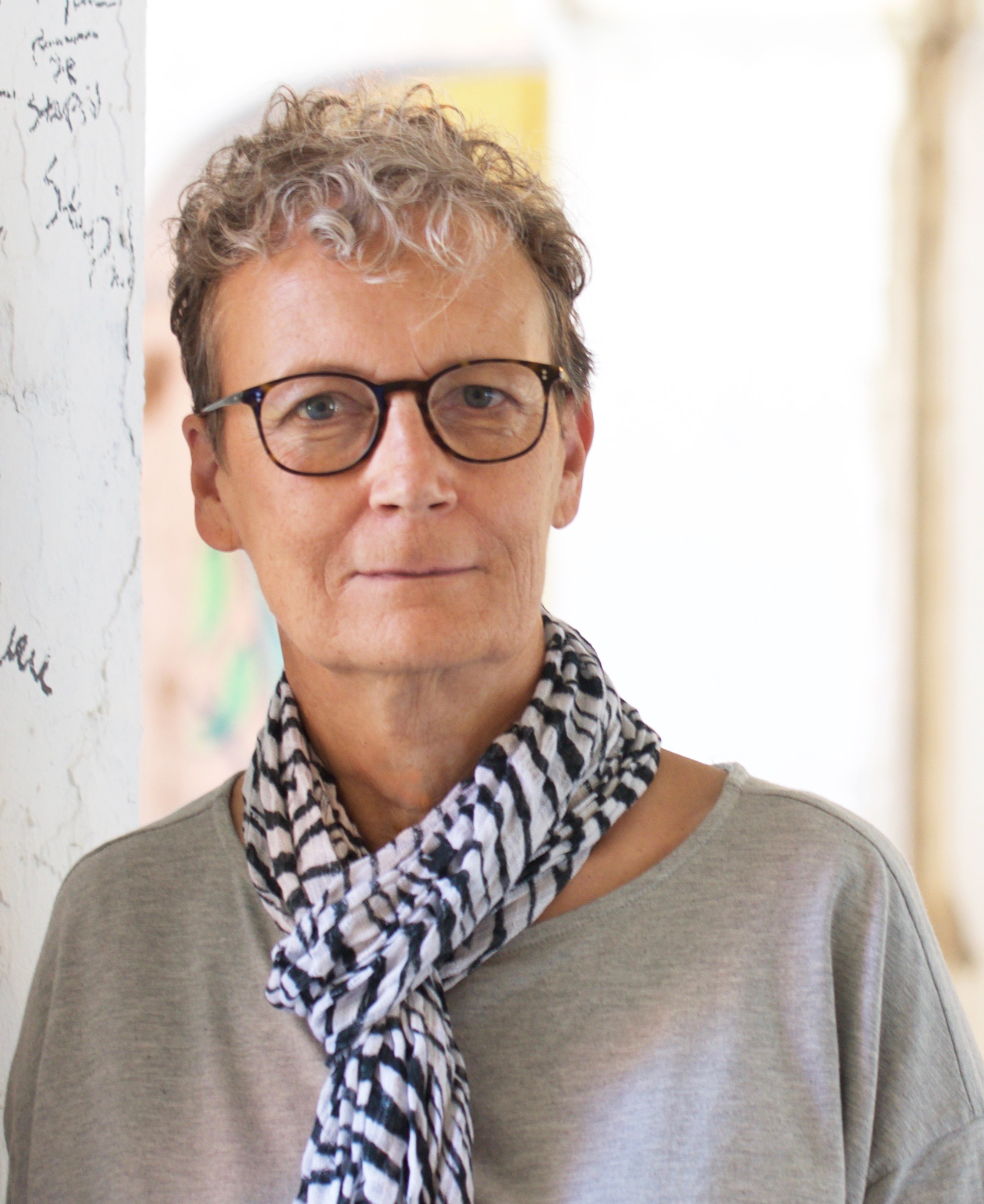
- Laughlin in 2020
- Born: April 9, 1955 (age 71)
- Occupation: Novelist
- Writing career
- Genre: Lesbian detective

Anne Laughlin (born April 9, 1955) is a writer from Chicago, Illinois. She is the author of seven novels of crime fiction, as well as many published short stories. Laughlin was named an emerging writer by the Lambda Literary Foundation in 2008 and 2014 and was awarded a writing residency at Ragdale. She has been awarded four Goldie Awards from the Golden Crown Literary Society, as well as shortlisted three times for Lambda Literary Awards. She has also been awarded an Alice B Readers Award for excellence in lesbian fiction.

Laughlin has been published throughout her career by Bold Strokes Books, an independent press that specializes in works by LGBTQ authors. From her first novel, Sometimes Quickly, she has centered her stories around the lives of queer characters caught up in some way with crime. She has written a police procedural, three books featuring a private detective, and three mysteries. She also wrote the game Murder at the Folkestone Inn for the Adventure Game Toolkit, which won an Honorable Mention in a contest sponsored by the platform. Her short stories have appeared in many anthologies of queer literature. It Only Occurred to Me Later was a finalist in the short fiction contest at Saints & Sinners LGBTQ+ Literary Festival. Swan Club appeared in the 2025 anthology Crime Ink: Iconic.

She currently serves on the board of directors of the Mystery Writers of America and is a member of MWA's Queer Advisory Board. She reviews books for The Gay & Lesbian Review and Lambda Literary Review.

A lifelong Chicagoan, Anne lives on the far north side of Chicago with her wife, Linda Braasch. In her spare time, she teaches adults to read at Literacy Chicago.

== Publications ==
- Sometimes Quickly (2008)
- Veritas (2009)
- Runaway (2012)
- The Acquittal (2014)
- A Date to Die (2017)
- Money Creek (2020)
- Clean Kill (2024)
