= Agata (surname) =

Agata (written: 縣, 阿形 or あがた in hiragana) is a Japanese surname. Notable people with the surname include:

- Ichirou Agata (阿形 一郎), Japanese guitarist
- Morio Agata (あがた 森魚, born 1948), Japanese singer-songwriter and actor
- Rio Agata (born 1999), Indonesian footballer

== See also ==
- D'Agata
- Agate (name)
