= D'Agata =

D'Agata is a family name of Italian origin.

Notable people with the surname include:

- Antoine D'Agata, French photographer and film director
- Antonino D'Agata, Italian politician
- Charlie D'Agata, American reporter
- Giuseppe D'Agata, Italian writer
- John D'Agata, American essayist
- Mario D'Agata, Italian boxer

== See also ==
- Agata (surname)
