= Agate (disambiguation) =

Agate is a semi-precious stone.

Agate may also refer to:

== Geography ==
- Agate, Colorado
- Agate, Nebraska
- Agate, North Dakota
- Agate Beach, Oregon
- Agate Desert, Oregon
- Agate Fossil Beds National Monument, Nebraska
- Agate Pass, Washington

== Other uses ==
- AGATE (architecture framework)
- Agate (game company)
- Agate (rocket)
- Agate (typography)
- Agate Publishing
- MV Agate, a ship
- AGATE (Advanced General Aviation Transport Experiments), a NASA program
- Agate (name)
