= Agate (name) =

Agate is a given name or surname shared by several notable people, including:

== Surname ==
- Alfred Thomas Agate (1812–1846), American painter and miniaturist
- Frederick Styles Agate (1803–1844), American painter
- James Agate (1877–1947), English literary critic
- Jeffery Agate (1919–1977), British managing director of a DuPont factory
- Mariano Agate (1939–2013), Sicilian (Italian) organized crime figure

== Given name ==
- Agate Caune (born 2004), Latvian middle - and long-distance runner
- Agate Nesaule, Latvian writer
- Agate Rašmane (born 1997), Latvian sports shooter
- Agate de Sousa (born 2000), Santomean long jumper

== Middle name ==
- Runa Agate Sandvik (born 1987), Privacy and security researcher

== See also ==
- Agate (disambiguation)
- Agata (surname)
