= The Dyke railway station =

Former railway station in England

The Dyke
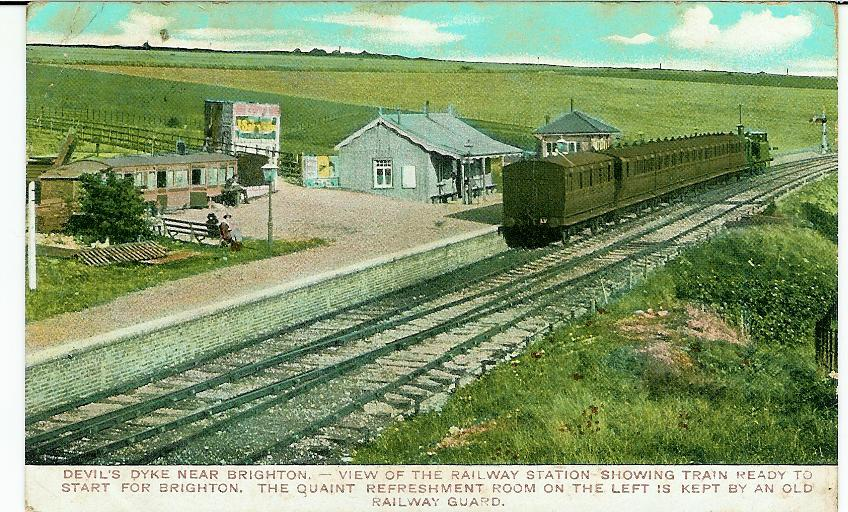

General information
- Location: Devil's Dyke, Mid Sussex; England
- Coordinates: 50.8784722°N 0.2104778°W
- Grid reference: TQ260103
- Platforms: 1

Other information
- Status: Disused

History
- Original company: Brighton and Dyke Railway (operated by the London Brighton and South Coast Railway)
- Post-grouping: Southern Railway

Key dates
- 1 September 1887: Opened
- 1 January 1917: Closed
- 26 July 1920: Reopened
- 1 January 1939: Closed
Location

The Dyke railway station was a railway station near Devil's Dyke in West Sussex, England which opened in 1887 and closed in 1939.

== History ==
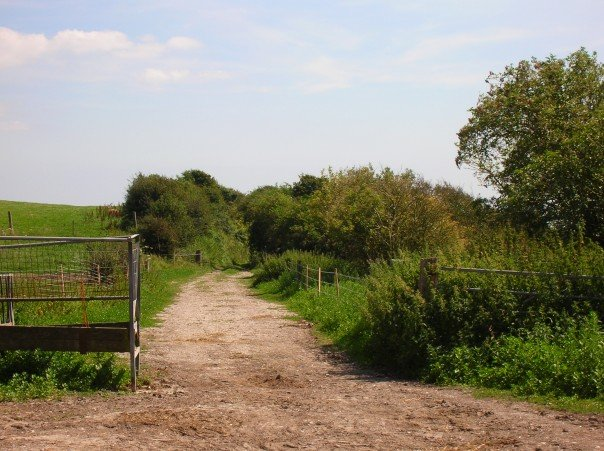
Site of the Dyke Station in 2007

The Dyke Station opened as the terminus for the standard gauge railway line which ran from Dyke Junction Station (now known as Aldrington railway station) to 200 feet (61 m) below the summit of Devil's Dyke. The line was opened by the Brighton and Dyke Railway Company to serve what was at the time a very popular tourist destination, boasting two bandstands, an observatory, a camera obscura and fairground rides. The station itself was equipped with basic facilities to accommodate tourists and postcards of the station buildings reveal a converted railway carriage with shack attached bearing the sign "Tea and Cakes".

The 1893 August Bank Holiday saw around 30,000 people flock to the Dyke, many of them brought by the railway. Operations continued until 1917 when, in the midst of the First World War, the line was closed as a wartime economy measure. Services recommenced in 1920 but lasted only a further eighteen years; the line closing in the face of increased competition from motor buses.

The Southern Railway purchased a Sentinel-Cammell steam railcar in June 1933 for use on the branch. Although operationally successful, the single railcar was not large enough to meet the needs of the line. The railcar was transferred away in March 1936 and tried in other areas, but was withdrawn in 1940.

== Preservation ==
The station was demolished after closure and the site is occupied by a farm. Part of the trackbed of the line remained unused until 1988 when the "Dyke Railway Trail" was created.

== Services ==
Preceding station	Disused railways	Following station
Golf Club Halt	London, Brighton and South Coast Railway; Brighton and Dyke Railway (1887-1939)	Terminus

== Bibliography ==
- Bradley, D.L. (October 1975). Locomotives of the Southern Railway, part 1. London: RCTS. ISBN 0-901115-30-4.
