= AGATA (gamma-ray detector) =

AGATA gamma-ray detector

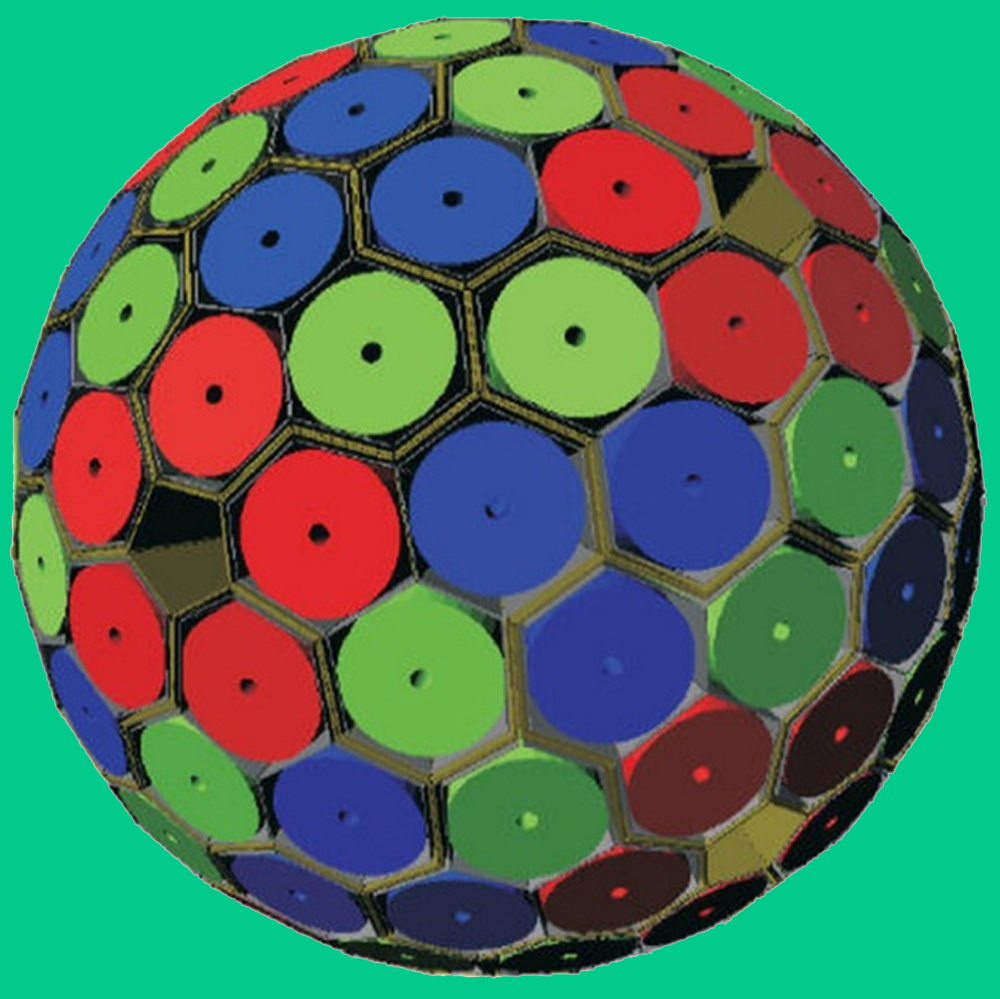
A schematic view of the AGATA array in the full 4π configuration

AGATA, for Advanced GAmma Tracking Array, is a High-Purity Germanium (HPGe) semiconductor detector array for γ-ray spectroscopy that is based on the novel γ-ray tracking concept. It offers excellent position resolution thanks to high segmentation of individual HPGe crystals and refined pulse-shape analysis algorithms, and high detection efficiency and peak-to-total ratio thanks to elimination of Compton-suppression shielding in favour of tracking the path of γ rays through the spectrometer as they are scattered from one HPGe crystal to another. AGATA is being built and operated by a collaboration including 40 research institutions from thirteen countries in Europe. The first Memorandum of Understanding for the construction of AGATA has been signed in 2003 by the participating institutions; the updated Memorandum of Understanding, signed in 2021, foresees the extension of the array to a 3π configuration by 2030. Over the years, AGATA has been steadily growing, and currently is operated in a 1π configuration at Legnaro National Laboratories after campaigns at GANIL (2014-2021), GSI Helmholtz Centre for Heavy Ion Research (2012-2014) and Legnaro National Laboratories (2010-2011). AGATA can be coupled with ancillary detectors, such as magnetic spectrometers, fast-timing detectors, charged particles or neutron detectors.

== High-fold segmented high-purity Ge detectors ==
The AGATA detectors are based on encapsulated and electrically segmented n-type high-purity Ge crystals. They are 36-fold segmented with six-fold azimuthal and six-fold longitudinal segmentation. Each detector is 9 cm long and is circular at the rear side with a diameter of 8 cm, and hexagonal at the front face. The common inner electrode and 36 segments are read out via individual preamplifiers. Three detector shapes exist, making it possible to tightly pack the AGATA crystals in triple cryostats.

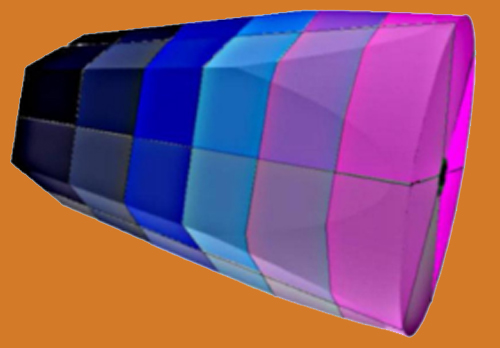
Schematic representation of the electric segmentation of an AGATA detector.

The parameters of the detectors are:

- Maximum cylinder size: 90.0 mm length, 40.0 mm radius.
- Coaxial hole size: 10.0 mm diameter, extension to 13.0 mm from the front face.
- Passivation layers: 1.0 mm at the back of the detector, 0.6 mm around the coaxial hole.
- Encapsulation: 0.8 mm thickness with a 4.0 mm crystal-can distance
- Cryostat: 1.0 mm thickness with a 2.0 mm capsule-cryostat distance.

=== Operation principle ===
Gamma rays interact with the detector's material mainly via Compton effect, photoelectric effect and pair production, transferring their energy to electrons or positrons. They, in turn, generate a cloud of charge carriers (electrons and holes) which induces image charges on the detector electrodes. As the charge carriers drift toward the electrodes, the change of the image charge causes a flow of currents into or out of the electrodes. The evolution of induced charges on the electrodes continues until the primary charge reaches its destination electrode and neutralizes the image.

For a multi-segmented detector, the induced charge can be distributed over several electrodes. By analysing these signals using a pulse-shape analysis it is possible to localize the point where the γ-ray interaction took place with a precision better than the segment size.

== Digital signal processing electronics ==
The interaction positions of gamma rays within the detector are determined from digital pulse-shape analysis. The pre-amplified detector signal is digitized with 14-bit resolution with a speed of 100 Ms/s. They are subsequently compared with a database of calculated pulse shapes in order to obtain, for each interaction point, the energy deposition, its time and three spatial coordinates of the interaction point.

== Pulse-shape analysis ==
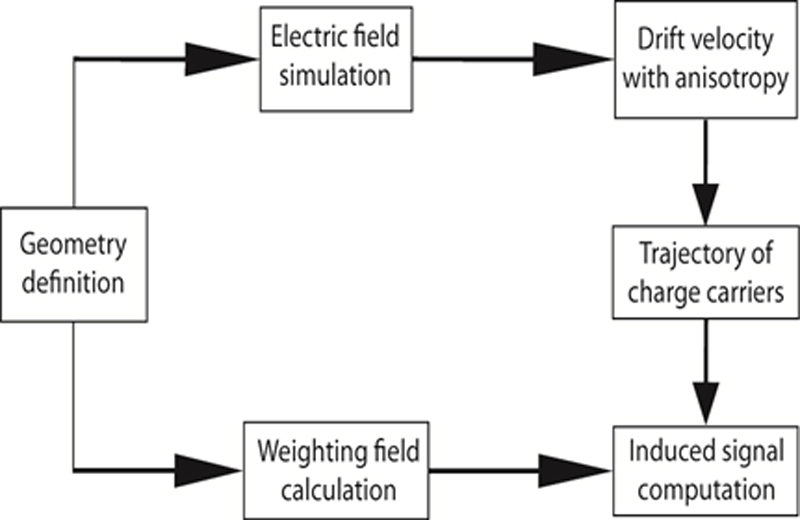
Working principle of the simulation of AGATA signals

To determine the interaction point of a γ ray in a segmented HPGe detector, the shape of the signal induced on the charge-collecting electrode (corresponding to the segment in which the interaction took place) and those of the transient signals measured on the neighbouring segments are analysed. By analysing the rise time of the signal induced on the charge-collecting electrode the radial coordinate of the interaction point can be determined. The mirror charges appearing on the neighbouring segments' electrodes are sensitive to longitudinal and azimunthal coordinates of the interaction point.

In the implementation of the pulse-shape analysis technique for AGATA, the measured pulse shapes are compared, in real time, to the database of signals calculated on a fine (2 mm) grid for each type of AGATA HPGe crystals The calculations have been validated by comparisons with pulses measured using tightly collimated γ-ray sources. Several different codes are used for these calculations and their general working principle is illustrated in the figure. Effects such as anisotropic carrier drift velocity with respect to the crystallographic axis direction of the Ge crystal are taken into account.

== Gamma-ray tracking ==
Tracking algorithms can be applied to information from the pulse-shape analysis (positions of the interaction points together with the energy deposited at each point, and signal timing) in order to reconstruct the path of each gamma ray through the AGATA spectrometer, including possible scattering from one crystal to another. There are two categories of algorithms used for this task: forward-tracking algorithms, which start from the known position of the source and reconstruct the track of photons as they interact in the detector, and back-tracking algorithms, which start from a potential point of the last interaction in the spectrometer's volume and reconstruct the track backwards to the source. The forward-tracking algorithms have been shown to be more efficient and therefore they have been implemented in the AGATA data-acquisition software.
