= Antonio Rostagni =

Italian physicist (1903–1988)

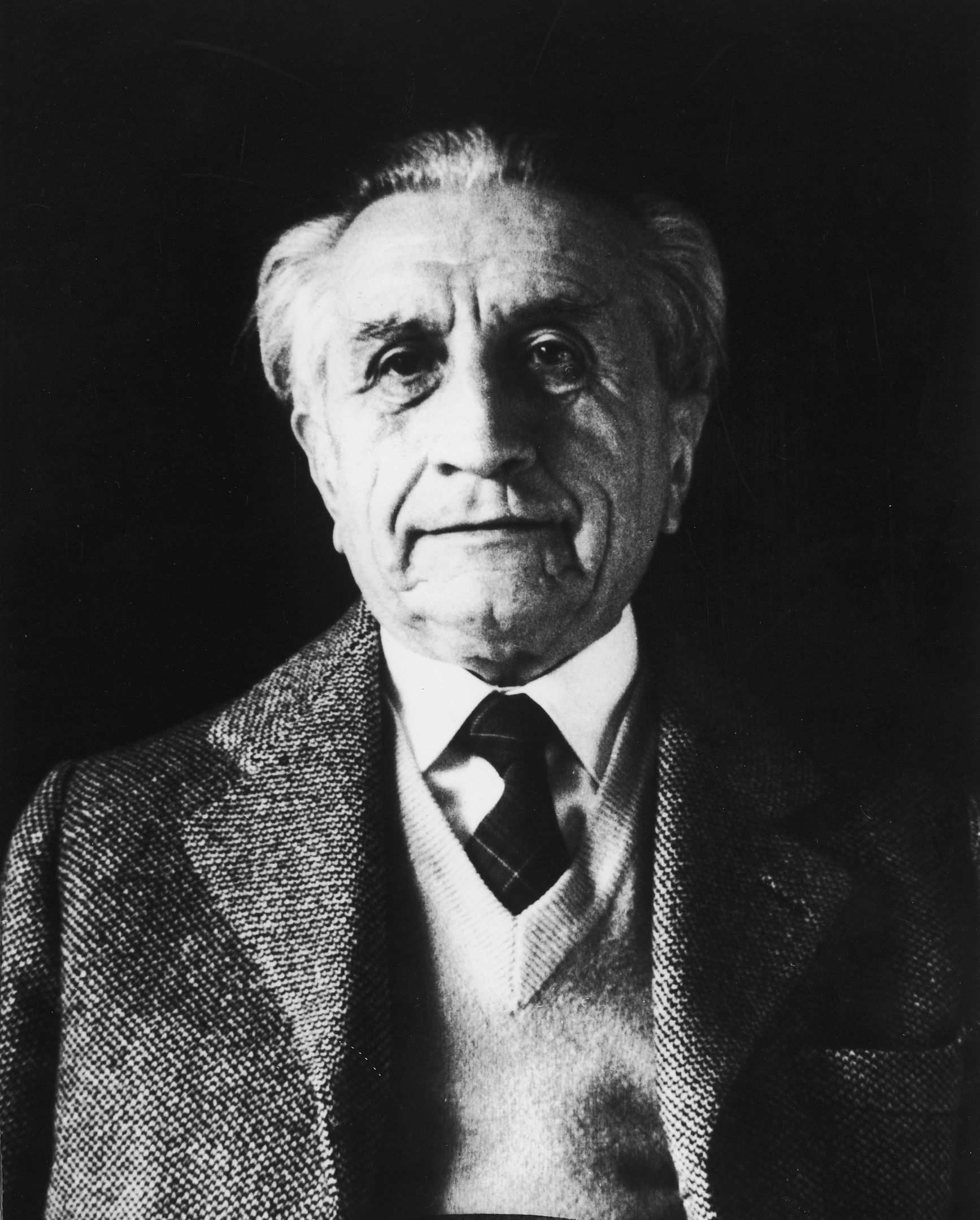
- Born: 14 July 1903; Novara
- Died: 5 December 1988 (aged 85); Padua
- Education: University of Turin
- Scientific career
- Fields: Physics
- Workplaces: University of Messina; University of Padua
- Doctoral advisor: Alfredo Pochettino

Antonio Rostagni (14 July 1903 – 5 December 1988) was an Italian physicist and academician.

He was a physicist involved in research in the fields of terrestrial physics, electromagnetic waves, and cosmic rays.

He was professor of physics at the University of Messina beginning in 1935 and at the University of Padua beginning in 1938. Among his students was Giuseppe Grioli.

Starting in 1950, he was a corresponding member of the Accademia dei Lincei of which he became a national member. He became a member of the Academy of Sciences of Turin in 1951.

Rostagni was vice-President of the Italian National Institute of Nuclear Physics from 1956 to 1958 and from 1958 to 1959 was director of the Research Division at the International Atomic Energy Agency (IAEA) at Vienna.
