= Brighton and Dyke Railway =

Railway line in England

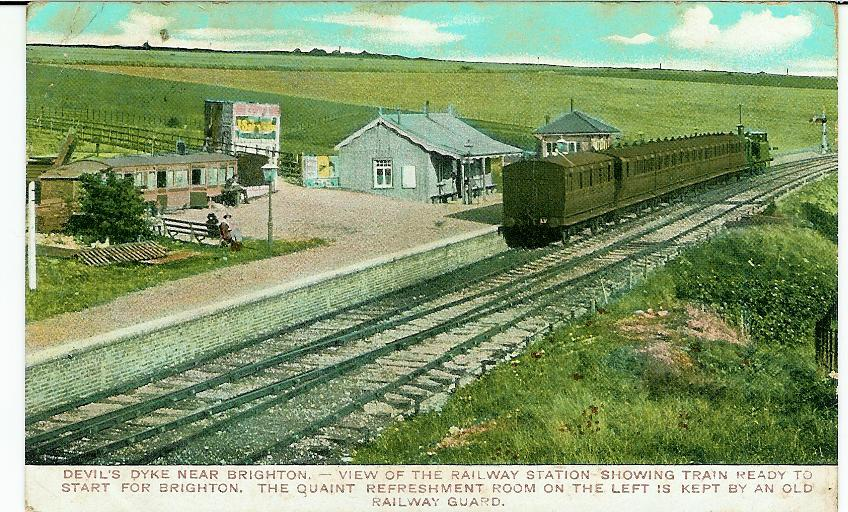
- Dyke Terminus

Overview
- Successor: Southern Railway (UK)

Technical
- Track gauge: Standard
- Track length: 3 1/2 miles (5.6 km)

The Brighton and Dyke Railway was an independent railway company which built a branch line from Brighton in East Sussex to the Devil's Dyke, a popular beauty spot nearby in the South Downs, England. The line opened in 1887. The intermediary Golf Club Halt opened in 1891 and Rowan Halt opened in 1934. The line was not commercially successful and closed in 1939.

== History ==
=== Promotion and opening ===
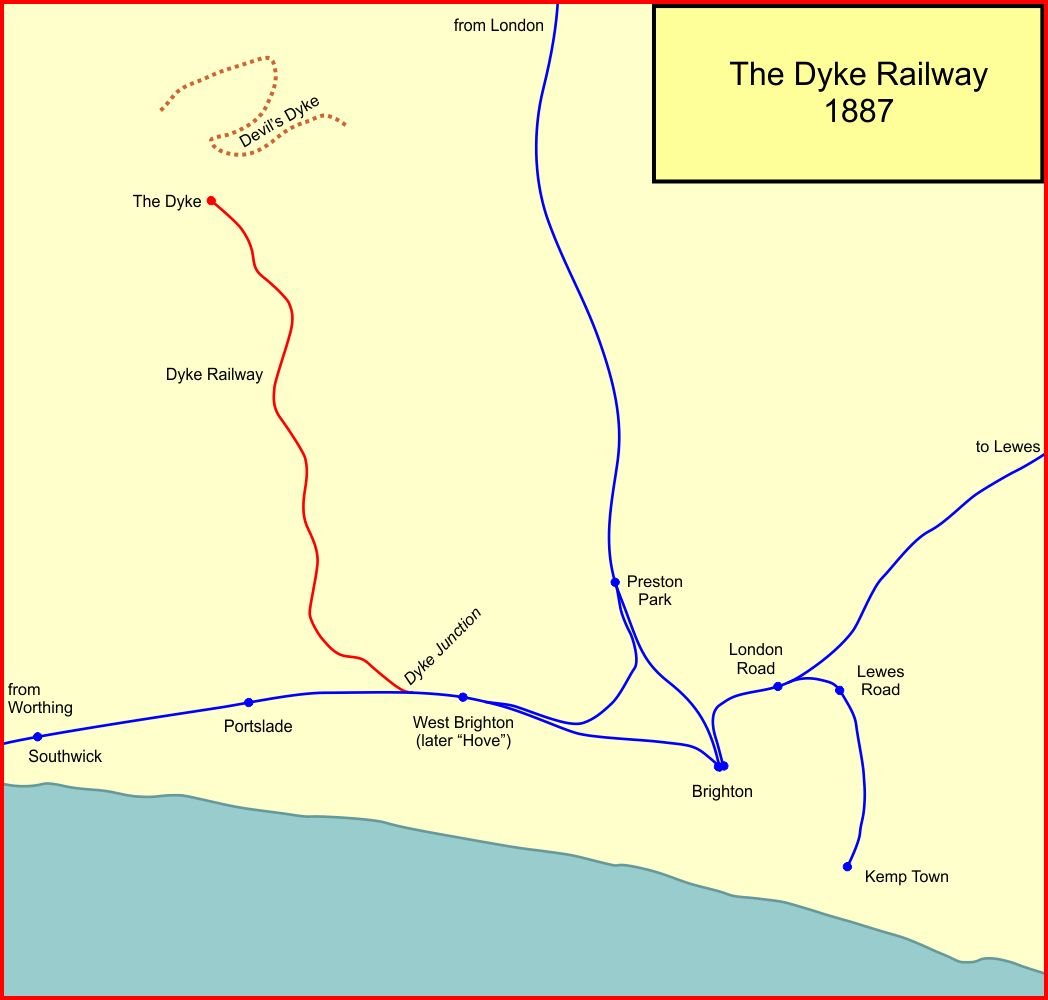
Devil's Dyke Railway

The Devil's Dyke is a spectacular beauty spot in the South Downs of England a short distance north-west of Brighton; it is said to be the deepest dry valley in the world. It is at some considerable altitude, making access a challenge. As leisure visits to such locations grew in popularity in the mid-Victorian period, the idea developed of a railway to the Devil's Dyke. A first suggestion was to connect to the London main line of the London, Brighton and South Coast Railway (LBSCR) south of Patcham, but Parliament turned this idea down.

Brighton and Dyke Railway Act 1877
- Act of Parliament
- Parliament of the United Kingdom
- Long title: An Act for making a Railway between Brighton and the Dyke, in the County of Sussex; and for other purposes.
- Citation: 40 & 41 Vict. c. clxxxix

Dates
- Royal assent: 2 August 1877

Text of statute as originally enacted

The LB&SCR line to Portsmouth passed nearby on the south side, and a short branch to the Devil's Dyke was considered feasible. The necessary authorising act of Parliament, the Brighton and Dyke Railway Act 1877 (40 & 41 Vict. c. clxxxix), was obtained on 2 August 1877, and the Brighton and Dyke Railway Company was incorporated. Share capital of £72,000 was authorised.

Brighton and Dyke Railway Act 1881
- Act of Parliament
- Parliament of the United Kingdom
- Long title: An Act to revive the powers and extend the periods for the compulsory purchase of lands and for the construction of the Brighton and Dyke Railway.
- Citation: 44 & 45 Vict. c. cxviii

Dates
- Royal assent: 18 July 1881

Text of statute as originally enacted

The authorisation included plans for the construction of two railways: from near Aldrington on the LBSCR to Hangleton (3 miles (4.8 km)) and thence to Poynings (1 mile (1.6 km)). Construction was not started at first, partly due to obstruction by the LBSCR, whose co-operation was needed. The powers obtained were allowed to lapse; they were revived by the Brighton and Dyke Railway Act 1881 (44 & 45 Vict. c. cxviii) of 18 July 1881. After further authorisations of time extension, the line was opened from Dyke Junction, on the Brighton to Portsmouth line near Aldrington, to a terminus at Hangleton, on 1 September 1887. The engineer was Charles Oliver Blaber. The line from there to Poynings was never built, although some preparatory work was carried out at the chalk face at the Dyke Terminus. The line was worked by the London, Brighton and South Coast Railway. The line had to overcome a vertical interval of 400 feet, by gradients typically of 1 in 40, and had almost continuous sharp curvature.

The line was never a paying proposition, and an Official Receiver was appointed in October 1895.

=== Operation ===
Turner describes the passenger train service in 1904-1905: Railmotor services had not then been started. On weekdays and Sundays there were four trains each way between Brighton and The Dyke, the first leaving Brighton on weekdays at 10 :25 and the last leaving The Dyke at 17:10; on Sundays the corresponding times were 10:00 and 17:15. The journey time, including a stop at Hove, was 20 minutes to The Dyke, and 18 or 19 minutes from there back to Brighton. The morning weekday service (10:25 from Brighton) and its return working at 11:15 from The Dyke, also conveyed goods wagons. For the latter purpose there was a siding serving the outer end of the east side of the single platform at The Dyke, the platform therefore acting as a dock. The Sunday service of four trains each way also ran on Christmas Day.

There was a small goods yard at the summit; it received some coal and cattle food and sent out little more than an occasional load of hay.

=== Golf Club Halt ===
The first halt on the branch, Golf Club Halt was opened in 1891 only 62 chains from the terminus and was for the use of the Golf Club. An electric bell in the clubhouse rang automatically when the starting signal at the station was lowered to advise intending passengers to drink up.

== The Dyke Steep-Grade Railway ==
A hotel and funfair had been opened at the summit. Although accessible from Brighton, there was only circuitous access from the settlements to the north so, in 1897, a "steep-grade" passenger railway was made on the north-facing slope between Poynings and the summit at Devil's Dyke. The 3 ft (914 mm) steep-grade railway cost £3,400 to build. The engineer was, as with the Dyke railway, Charles Blaber. Two open-sided cars each carried up to 14 passengers. The railway was worked by cable traction and the cars operated on the balanced system, driven by a 24 bhp Hornsby oil engine. The gradient of the 840 ft-long track increased from 1 in 8 at the bottom, through 1 in 5 in the centre section, to 1 in 2.9 at the top. Although initially very popular, the railway did not succeed, and in December 1900 it was put up for sale. There were no suitable offers but it lingered on and finally closed in 1908.

A cableway, termed an "aerial flight", was built across the Dyke ravine earlier in 1894. It was a funicular system, and the terminals were 1,100 feet apart. It too was not very successful. The usage steadily declined and by around 1909 it was closed down.

== The twentieth century ==
=== Railmotors ===
In 1904 the LBSCR decided to respond to the abstraction of local passenger business by motor buses and tramcars, by operating more frequent services by "motor trains", the term used by the company to describe single coach trains with a small integrated steam engine. This policy was coupled with the opening of several halts at locations on the coastal branches where housing development had taken place since the opening of the line. The line to Worthing was selected for early adoption of this system, and a new halt was called Dyke Junction Halt, close to the point of divergence of the Dyke branch. The halt was opened on 11 September 1905.

The railmotors operated on the Dyke Branch. Passengers complained about the railmotor unit due to the vibration from the engine; and it was said to be dirty, because it was kept in the loco shed and not the carriage shed. Overcrowding was also a problem, because the railmotor engine unit was not powerful enough to convey a second coach at busy times.

=== Wartime suspension ===
Operation on the line was suspended as a war emergency measure at the beginning of 1917, and was not resumed until 26 July 1920.

=== Grouping of the railways ===
On 22 July 1924 the Brighton and Dyke Railway company was incorporated into the Southern Railway as part of the process called the Grouping of the railways, following the Railways Act 1922.

=== Sentinel railcar ===
In 1932 a lightweight Sentinel-Cammell railbus was tried out on the line. Sentinel railcar no. 6 had wooden wheel centres to reduce noise but this created problems with track circuit operation on the main line and necessitated the provision of lorry-type brake drums.

=== Rowan Halt ===
A second halt on the branch was brought into use on 18 December 1933 to serve housing developments near the coast. It was named Rowan Halt and was the terminating point for about half the motor trains in the final winters of the line.

== Angus train control system ==
An Australian engineer, A R Angus, developed a system of train control that would intervene in the event of an engine driver failing to respond to an adverse signal. In 1912 and 1913 he arranged for a demonstration of his system on the West Somerset Mineral Railway, but World War I prevented development of the system. After the war, he negotiated to install it on the Dyke Railway. A demonstration was arranged in the presence of Col Pringle of the Board of Trade on 22 September 1921. Two Terrier locomotives were fitted, and one was driven under steam into the section occupied by the other. The apparatus sounded the engine whistle, and when the driver failed to respond, the brakes were applied, and steam cut off. It was claimed that additionally, the system would detect and restrict excessive speed on sharp curves, broken rails, and failure of the train braking system.

The Railway Magazine journalist commented that "As to how far these claims are justified we are not prepared to comment in default of more complete information".

== Closure ==
The line had never been profitable, and as motor buses became reliable and commonplace, they offered a much more attractive means of getting to the summit. The Dyke railway terminus was some distance below the summit, and a stiff climb was needed after arrival to get there. As custom declined, closure became inevitable and the last train ran on 31 December 1938.

== The route today ==
In 2016, the route from Aldrington to Hangleton Way has been mostly covered by commercial businesses or housing, although some undeveloped sections remain showing the outline of the route, including a tree-lined section along the edge of Hove cemetery. North of Hangleton Way, to Brighton and Hove Golf Club, the route is now a public footpath. The section between the golf club and The Dyke station terminus is now private land on which stands the remains of Golf Club Halt platform. The site of The Dyke station is occupied by farm buildings.
