= Tuctuc Ltd =

Auto rickshaw operator

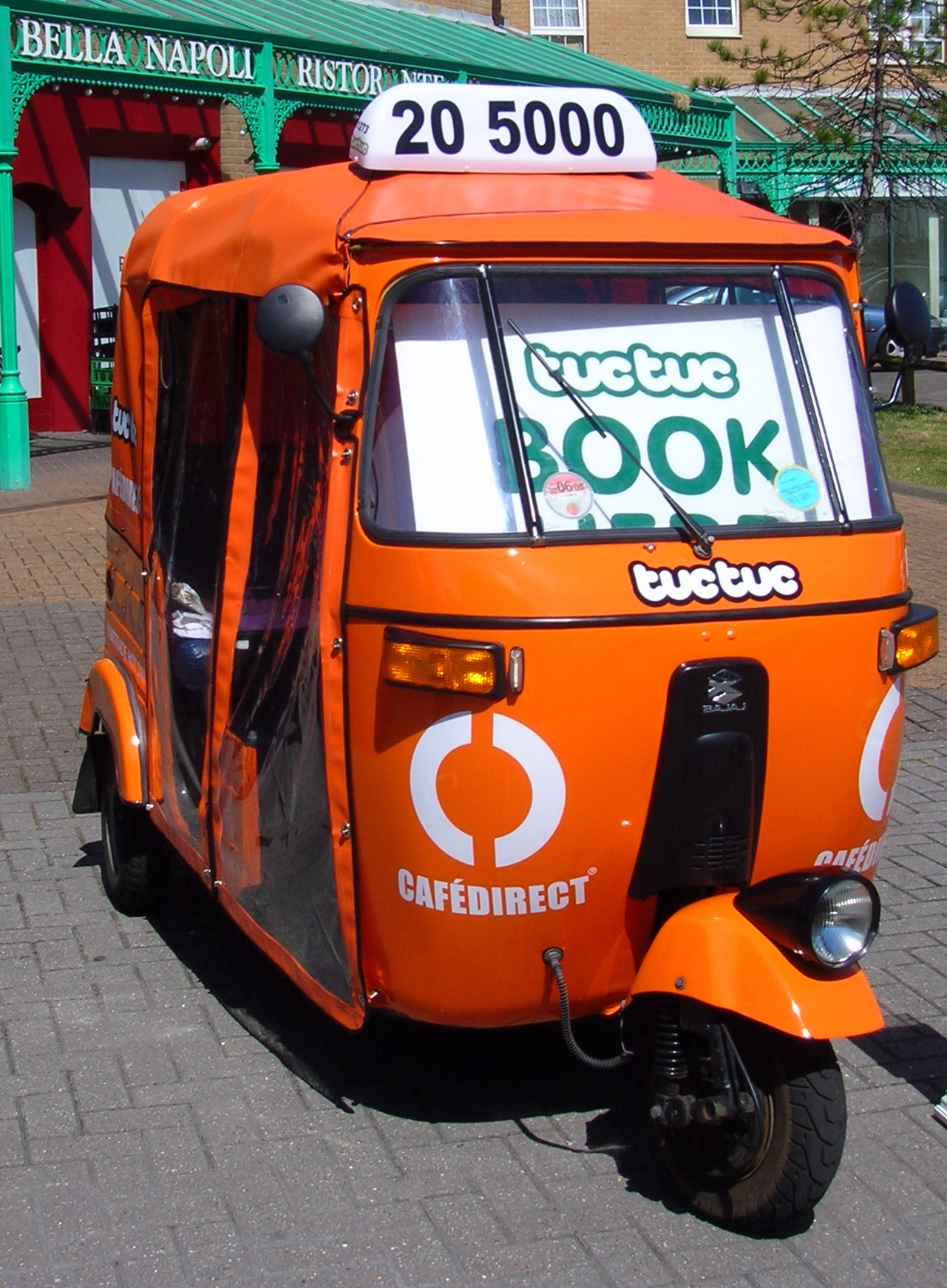
Tuctucs booking Auto rickshaw located in Brighton Marina.

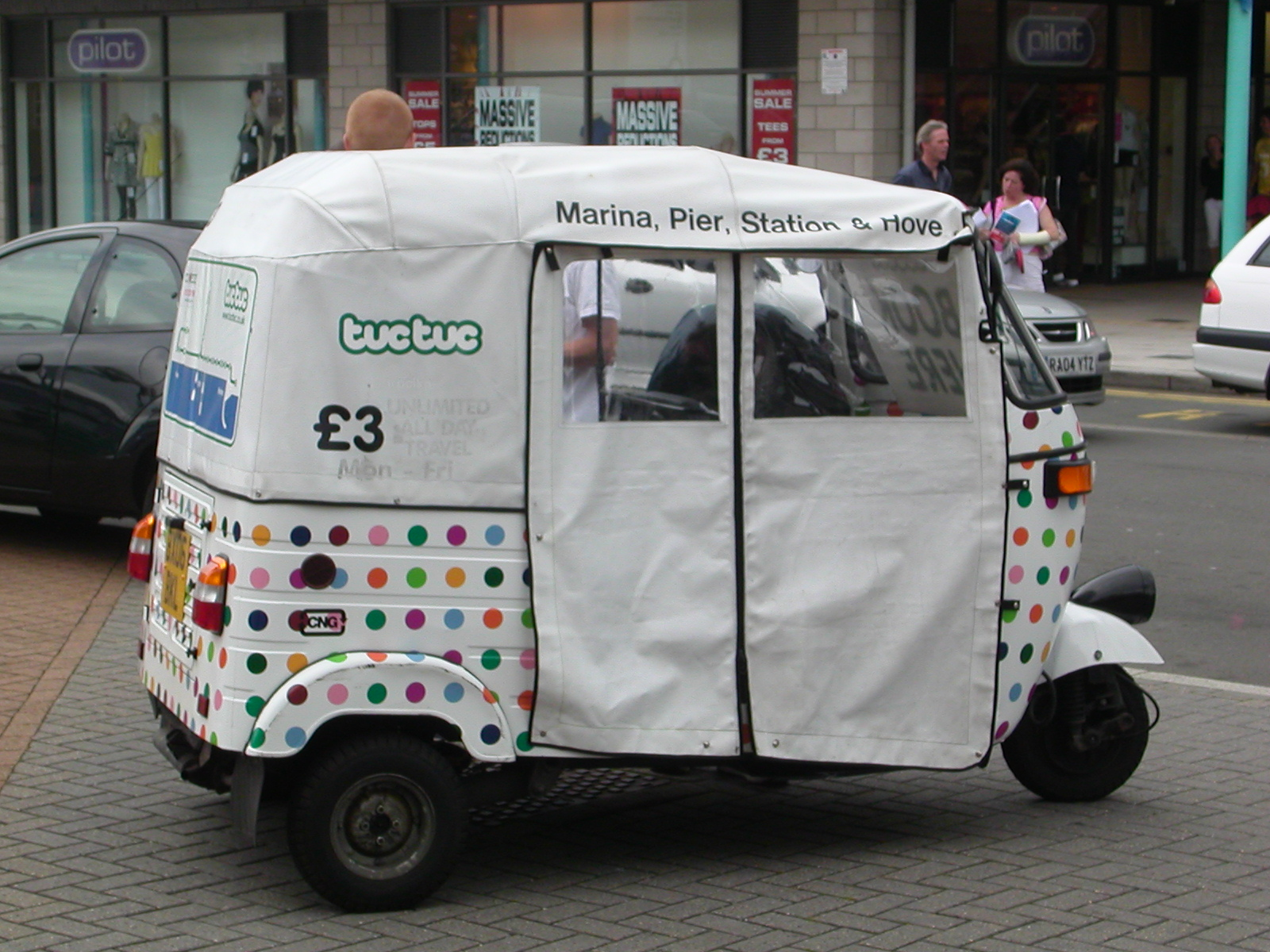
A tuctuc in service at Brighton Marina in July 2007, when a £3.00 flat fare applied.

Tuctuc Ltd was an auto rickshaw operator in Brighton, England. It operated for just over a year from the summer of 2006 until late 2007, but opposition from taxi operators and licence breaches "made the service unworkable" and the vehicles were withdrawn. In 2009, they were used again for weekend sightseeing tours of the city.

== History ==
The company was started in 2005 (Note: One source gives the founding date as 2006.) by Dominic Ponniah, a British-Asian who got the idea after a business trip in India. Tuctuc Ltd started off with 12 Bajaj Retros in various livery designs, including the Union Jack, a strawberry, Swiss cheese and Burberry check. Ponniah imported the vehicles from India and added some features such as anti-roll bars, seatbelts and rudimentary weather protection. The three-wheeled vehicles had a maximum speed of 35 miles per hour (56 km/h) and ran on compressed natural gas, for which a filling station was provided at Brighton Marina.

Ponniah applied for a passenger bus licence to run services on fixed routes between Brighton Marina, central Brighton and central Hove. Brighton and Hove City Council granted the company a licence to operate in October 2005; it was the first licensed auto rickshaw service established outside Asia. After a formal launch at Brighton Racecourse on 6 July 2006, the vehicles began running later that month for the summer season, charging a flat rate of £2.50 for any journey between Brighton railway station, Hove and Brighton Marina. In the same month, Ponniah stated that he intended to import another 12 vehicles in order to start similar operations in London and elsewhere in the United Kingdom: Bristol, Manchester, Birmingham and Edinburgh were planned to follow London, where services were expected to start in May 2007.

The company immediately faced "stiff opposition" from taxi drivers. A body representing 1,500 drivers in the city attempted to take legal action against Tuctuc Ltd, initially citing increased congestion and claiming that the vehicles were unsafe, then stating that the service was not operating to a timetable as required by the Public Passenger Vehicles Act 1981. An investigation by the Traffic commissioner in October 2006 found that the company was failing to operate to its timetables 50% of the time, and the following month levied a fine of £16,500 (reduced on appeal to £8,000) for breaching its passenger bus licence terms. The timetable was then amended, but Ponniah stated this made the operation "unworkable" and withdrew the service for the winter season. This resulted in another enquiry by the Traffic commissioner, who investigated whether the company's licence had been breached again by ceasing operations without giving a statutory notice period. Another setback occurred in September 2006 when the Burberry-themed rickshaw, known as the "Chavrolet" and "voted the most popular design by the public", had to be redesigned after Burberry threatened legal action over trademark infringement.

Ponniah announced a revised service in April 2007. Instead of operating along fixed routes to specific destinations, the vehicles would offer pre-booked journeys anywhere in the city, using a different type of public service vehicle licence. Permission was granted to operate up to 30 vehicles, and Ponniah purchased 10 new vehicles with a larger capacity (up to six passengers rather than three). Some of the original three-seater auto rickshaws were retained and stayed in service alongside the six-seaters.

The new service began on 23 May 2007, but in January 2008 operations ceased permanently and the Traffic commissioner imposed another fine and revoked the company's licence because of further breaches. No auto rickshaws have run in the city since then, except for a period during the summer of 2008, when some vehicles were used on sightseeing tours of Brighton's tourist attractions.

== Bibliography ==
- Collis, Rose (2010). The New Encyclopaedia of Brighton. (based on the original by Tim Carder) (1st ed.). Brighton: Brighton & Hove Libraries. ISBN 978-0-9564664-0-2.
