= Rowan Halt railway station =

Former railway station in England

Coordinates: 50°50′24″N 0°11′41″W

Rowan Halt
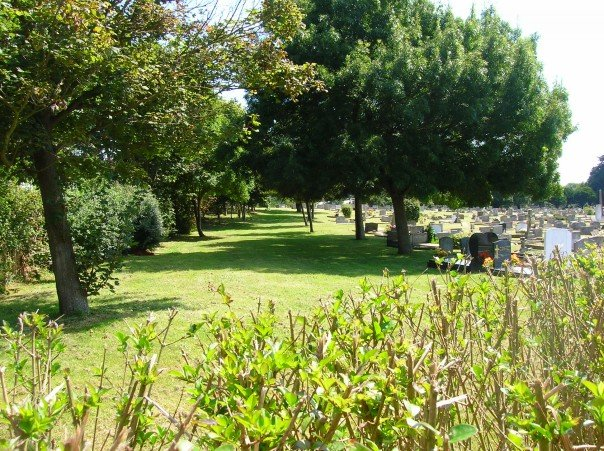
- Site of Rowan Halt station

General information
- Location: Hove, Brighton & Hove; England
- Platforms: 1

Other information
- Status: Disused

History
- Original company: Southern Railway
- Post-grouping: Southern Railway

Key dates
- 18 December 1933: Opened
- 1 January 1939: Closed
Location

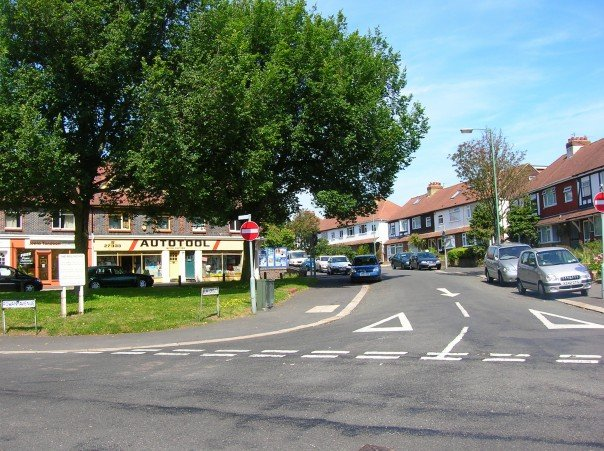
Rowan Avenue junction with Elm Drive

Rowan Halt railway station, was a railway station in Hove, in East Sussex, England which opened in 1933 and closed on 1 January 1939; the layout and curvature of Rowan Avenue indicates where the branch ran.

== Location ==
The station served the Aldrington Estate (then being built by T. J. Braybon & Sons Ltd), and "enabled residents working in Brighton or Hove to return home for their cooked meal at lunchtime".

Preceding station	Disused railways	Following station
Aldrington	London, Brighton and South Coast Railway; Brighton and Dyke Railway (1887-1939)	Golf Club Halt
