= Devil's Dyke, Sussex =

English valley

Devil's Dyke
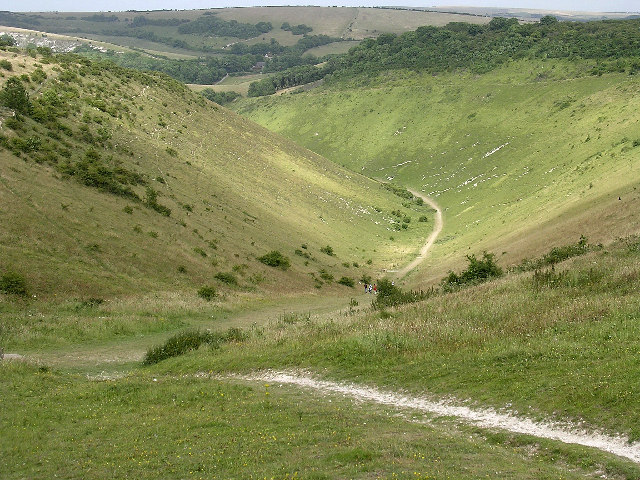
- View of Devil's Dyke

Geography
- Location: West Sussex, England
- Coordinates: 50.885°N 0.205°W
- Interactive map of Devil's Dyke

Devil's Dyke, also sometimes called Satan's ditch, is a 100-metre (330 ft) deep V-shaped dry valley on the South Downs in Sussex in southern England, 5 miles (8.0 km) north-west of Brighton. It is managed by the National Trust, and is also part of the Beeding Hill to Newtimber Hill Site of Special Scientific Interest. Devil's Dyke was a major local tourist attraction in the late 19th and early 20th centuries. It is now a popular viewpoint and site for walking, model aircraft flying and hang gliding. The South Downs Way passes the site.

== Geological history ==
The Dyke is formed in rocks of the Chalk Group which originated as marine sediments during the Cretaceous period.

It is a misconception common amongst local residents of Brighton that the valley was formed by some kind of glacial action, the myth of a 'glacier' being a misunderstanding of accounts such as this one from the Encyclopaedia of Brighton by Timothy Carder (1990):

"In reality the 300-foot-deep valley was carved by tremendous amounts of water running off the Downs during the last Ice Age when large amounts of snow thawed and the frozen chalk prevented any further absorption; erosion was aided by the freeze-thaw cycle and the valley was deepened by the 'sludging' of the saturated chalk.".

The Devil's Dyke V-shaped dry valley is the result of solifluction and river erosion. More than 14,000 years ago, the area experienced an intensely cold climate (but not glacial conditions). Snowfields capped the South Downs. Permafrost conditions meant that the chalk was permanently frozen. In summer, the snowfields melted and saturated the top layer of soil, because the water could not permeate the frozen chalk underneath. Waterlogged material situated above the permafrost slid down the gradient, removing material by friction, exposing deeper layers of frozen chalk. When the Ice Age ended, the snowfields covering the South Downs melted, and rivers formed across Sussex. The Devil's Dyke valley was completed by one such river.

== Geography ==
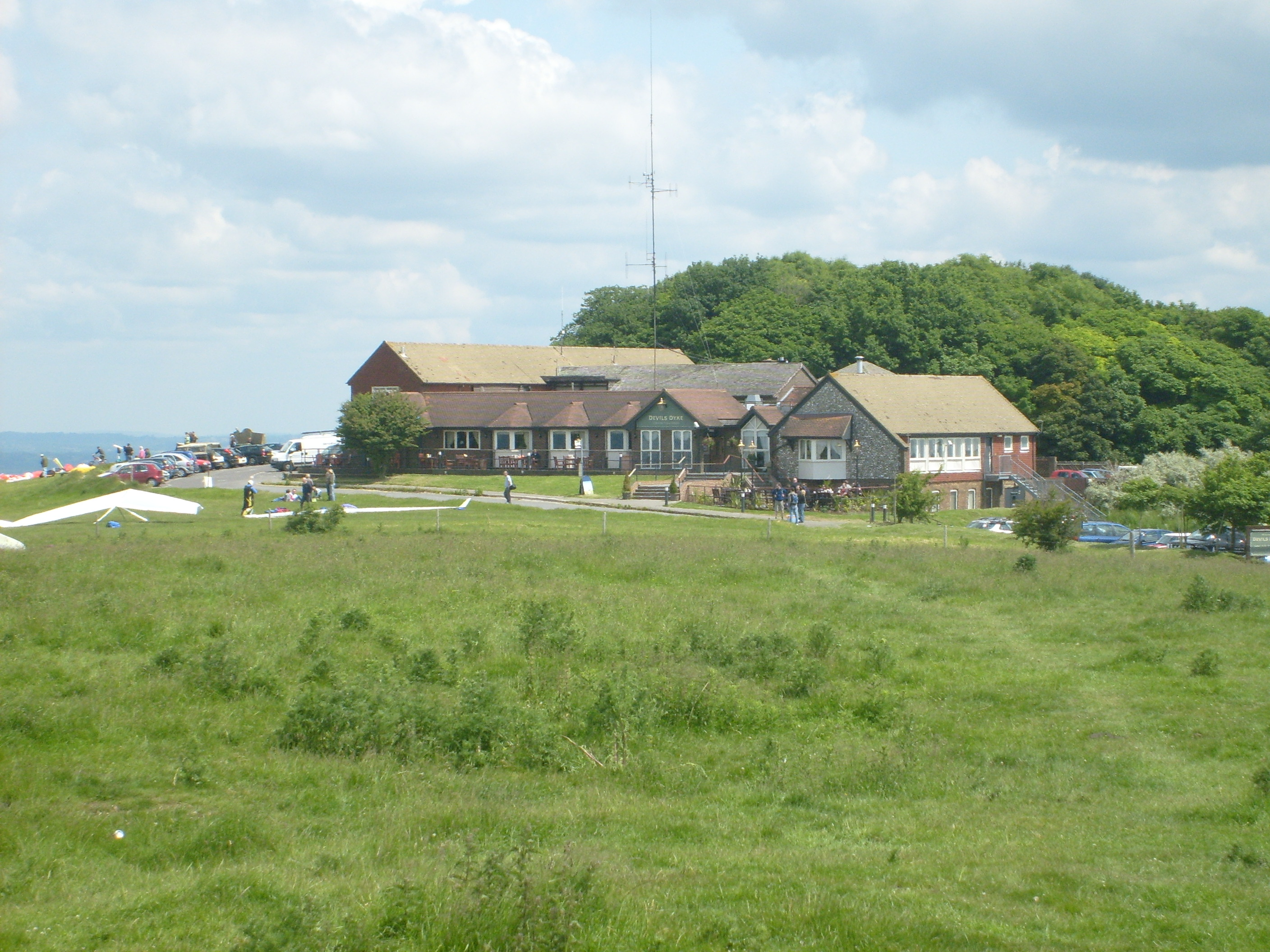
The Devil's Dyke Hotel and Restaurant.

The hills surrounding the valley rise to 217 metres (712 ft) and offer views of the South Downs, The Weald, and – on a clear day – the Isle of Wight. It is the site of ramparts, all that remain of an Iron Age hillfort, and a pub. It is a popular local beauty spot for the Brighton and Hove area, being an easy journey of just a few miles.

== History ==
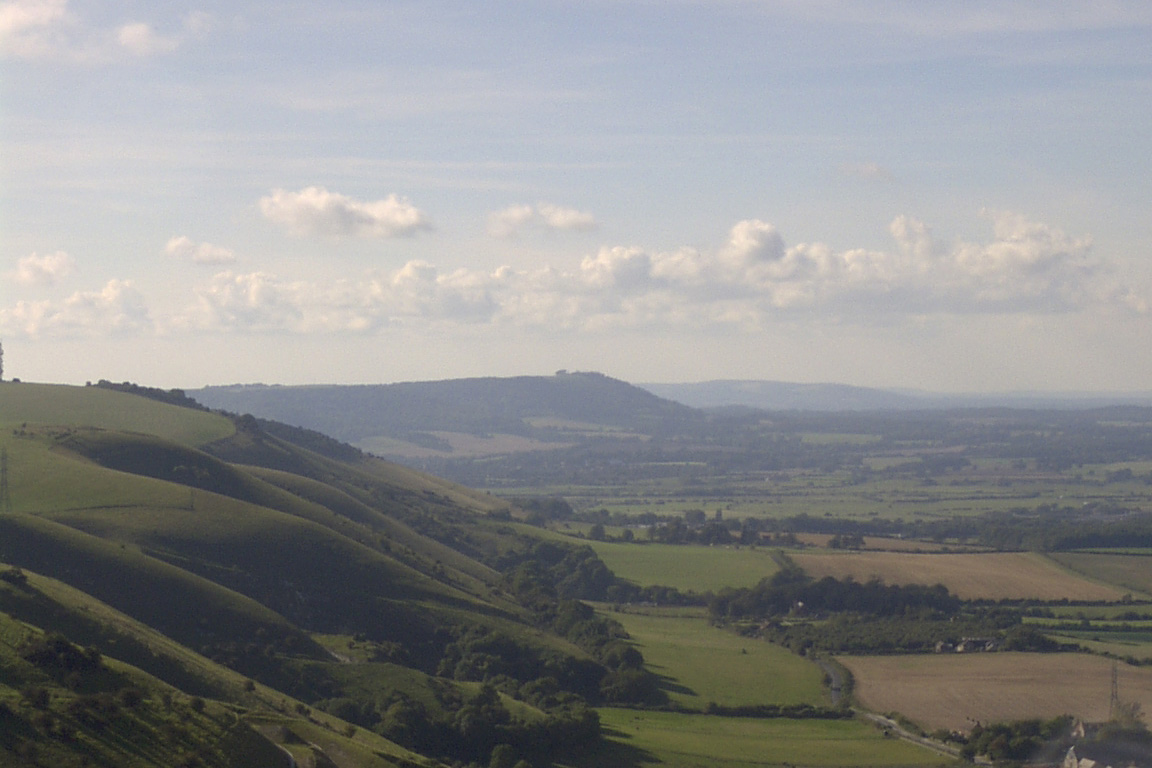
View from Devil's Dyke

=== Ancient history ===
Before and after the Iron Age, Devil's Dyke was used as a defensive site. This was probably because of its commanding view of the surrounding terrain, and also its steep edges surrounded by large expanses of flat land.

In the Iron Age, Devil's Dyke was an important site. All the vegetation was scraped off the white chalk, leaving Devil's Dyke as an impressive monument to both attract and intimidate the populace.

=== Victorian times ===
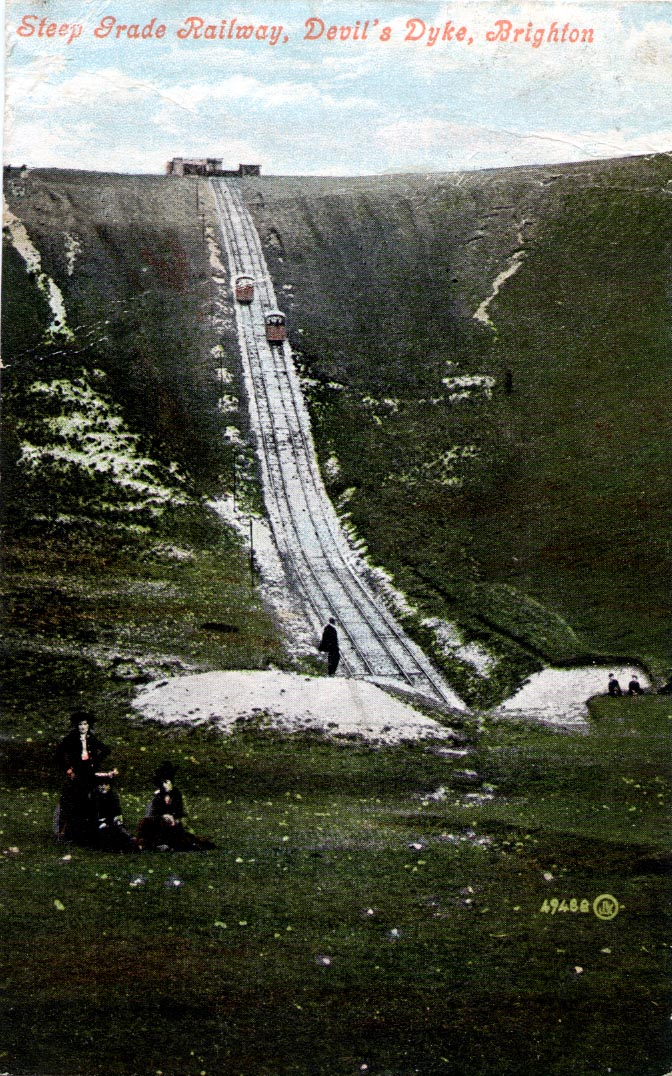
Steep Grade Railway about 1908

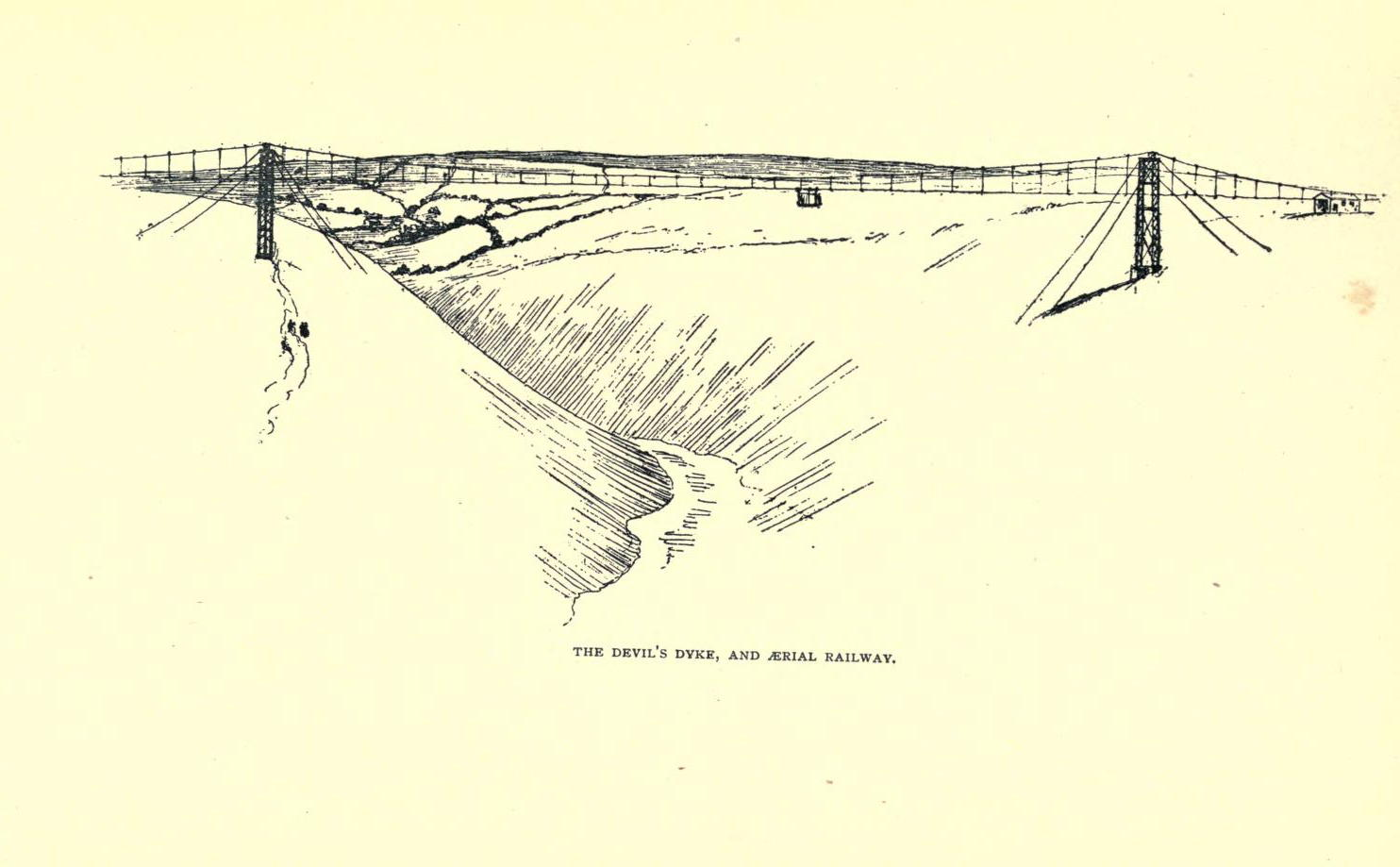
The aerial ropeway, 1897

In late Victorian times Devil's Dyke became a tourist attraction, complete with a fairground, two bandstands, an observatory and a camera obscura, all served by a branchline from Hove. During its heyday, Devil's Dyke was a huge attraction for the Victorians, with 30,000 people visiting on Whit Monday in 1893.

- From 1887 to 1938 a single-track railway branch line operated from near Aldrington in Hove to The Dyke railway station, the current Dyke Farm location, to transport sightseers to the foot of the hill.
- From 1894 to 1909 a cable car operated across the valley, covering a distance of 350 metres (380 yards), suspended 70 metres (230 ft) above the valley floor.
- From 1897 to 1909 the 3 ft (914 mm) narrow-gauge funicular Dyke Steep-Grade Railway rose 100 metres (330 ft) from near Poynings to the northern edge of the hillfort.

Traces remain of all three ventures, including the remains of concrete pylon supports for the cable car system.

=== Current use ===
Devil's Dyke has also become a popular site for hang gliding and (more recently) paragliding.

== Folklore ==
Local folklore and tradition explains the dyke as the work of the Devil. The most popular form of the story begins with the conversion of the Kingdom of Sussex to Christianity; Sussex was the last of the Anglo-Saxon kingdoms to embrace the new faith, and its conversion (and the saints who transpired it) infuriated the Devil as he thereby lost his last stronghold in England. He therefore resolved to exterminate the Christians by digging a trench through the South Downs (near the hill-fort of Chanctonbury Ring) so that the sea would flood through and drown the people of the Sussex Weald. The hermit Saint Cuthman of Steyning found out about the Devil's intentions by the revelation of God via unceasing prayer, and came up with a plan to stop him.

He proposed a wager: If the Devil could complete the trench in a single night he could have Cuthman's soul, but if he failed then he would have to abandon the project and leave the people of Sussex alone for good. The Devil accepted the wager and began work that night, working his way southward from Poynings toward the sea. The mounds of earth thrown up by his digging formed the nearby hills of Chanctonbury Ring, Cissbury Ring, Mount Caburn and Firle Beacon, and the Isle of Wight in the English Channel. At first Cuthman bided his time, but shortly after midnight he displayed a lit candle in his window while also startling a cock so that it would start crowing in alarm. The light and the sound of the cock crowing convinced the Devil that dawn was about to break, and thus that he had lost his wager with Cuthman. He therefore ran away in disgrace, leaving behind the unfinished trench henceforth known as Devil's Dyke. However, the more straightforward hagiography of Cuthman foregoes the wager, hill formation and chicken entirely — which may be accrued of later folklore — and states the aforementioned candle upon prayer began to blaze as a pillar of light (a common motif in saints' lives), which weakened the Devil exhausted by his prayers, and fled once exposed and the digging failed.

At the bottom of the Dyke are two humps, (50°53′12″N 0°12′07″W) known as 'the Devil's Graves', under which the Devil and his wife are supposedly buried. One legend claims that if a person runs backwards seven times around these humps whilst holding their breath, the Devil will appear.
