= Golf Club Halt railway station (England) =

Former railway station in England

Coordinates: 50°52′12″N 0°12′01″W

Golf Club Halt
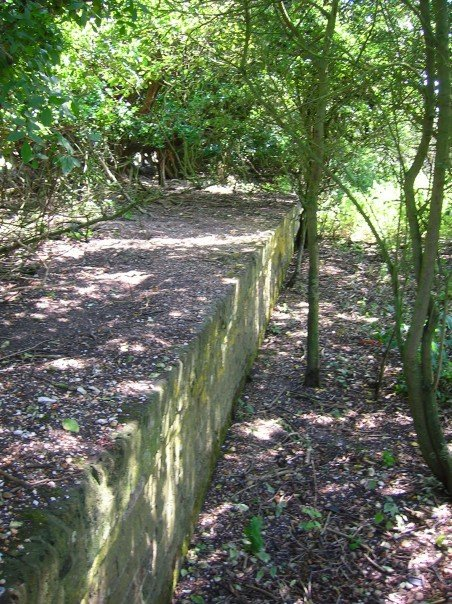
- Golf Club Halt station

General information
- Location: Hove, Brighton & Hove; England
- Grid reference: TQ267093
- Platforms: 1

Other information
- Status: Disused

History
- Original company: Brighton and Dyke Railway
- Pre-grouping: London, Brighton and South Coast Railway

Key dates
- 1891: Opened
- 1 January 1917: Closed
- 26 July 1920: Reopened
- 1 January 1939: Closed
Location

Dyke Railway Trail sign

Golf Club Halt railway station, was a railway station in Hove, in East Sussex, England which opened in 1891 and closed in 1939. The station served the Brighton & Hove Golf Club, established in 1887. The platform is still in situ, buried in undergrowth on private farmland.

Preceding station	Disused railways	Following station
Rowan Halt	London, Brighton and South Coast Railway; Brighton and Dyke Railway (1887-1939)	The Dyke
