= Agata potato =

Variety of potato

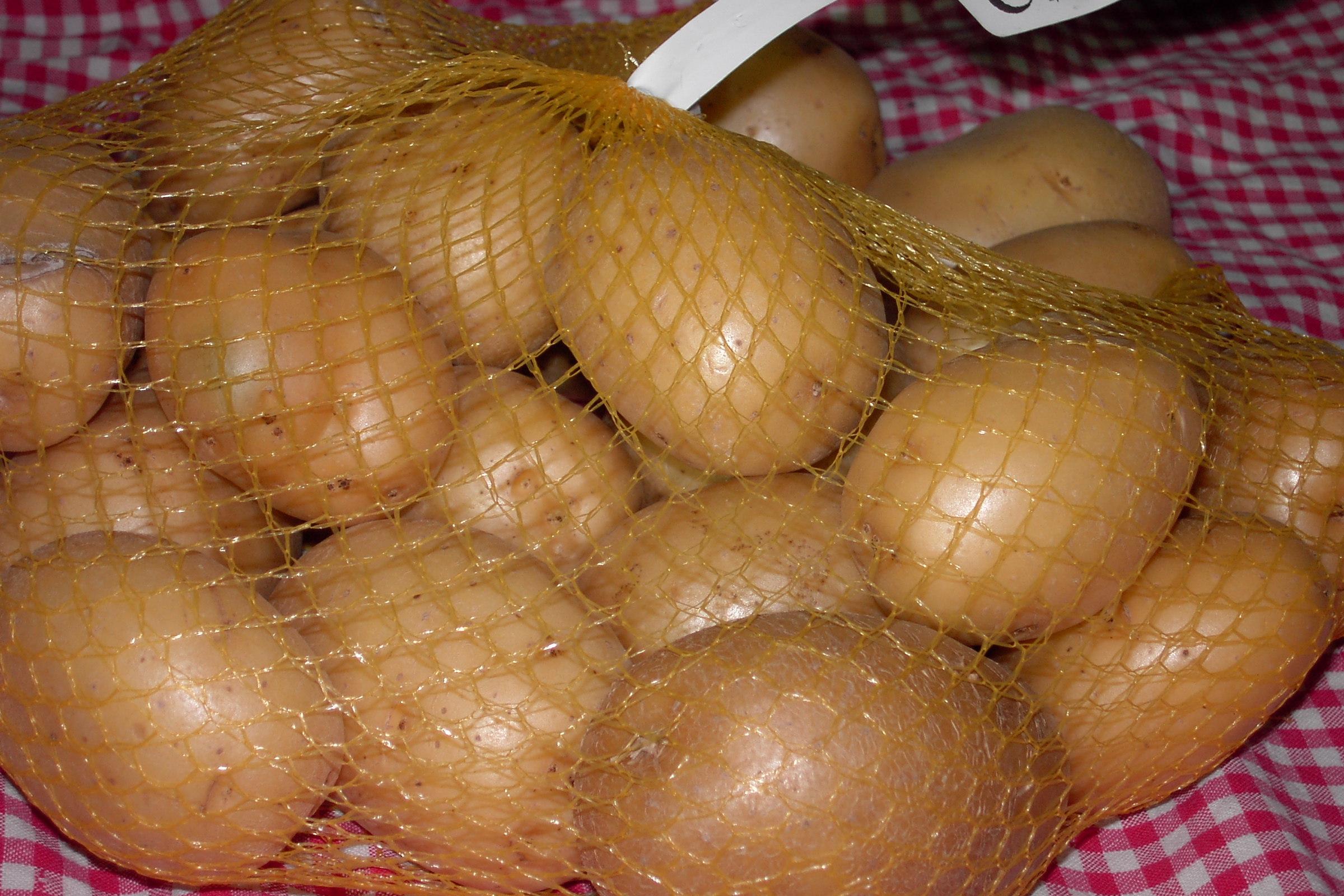
Store-bought "Agata" potatoes.

The Agata is a Dutch potato variety. It is a very early maturing, yellow-skinned, yellow-fleshed variety with an attractive bright skin. Agata produces high yields of uniform shaped tubers and is known for its high pack-out. It was bred by Svalöf Weibull A.B., from the cross BM 52-72 X Sirco in Emmeloord (The Netherlands) in 1976.

Characteristics of this variety include oval tuber shape, very short dormancy, very shallow eye depth, it has a low dry matter content and is not sensitive to harvest damage or dry rot.

Resistances for this variety would be that it is quite resistant to spraing, Yn-virus and Yntn-virus. It is quite susceptible to Erwinia and common scab. Also, it is resistant to golden nematode RO 1 and 4 and it is susceptible to golden nematode PA 2 and 3. Agata is also susceptible to late blight foliage as well as wart disease 2 and 6. The variety also has little susceptibility to late blight tuber and powdery scab.
