= Rio Agata =

Indonesian footballer (born 1999)

Personal information
- Full name: Mochammad Rio Agata
- Date of birth: 27 November 1999 (age 26)
- Place of birth: Surabaya, Indonesia
- Height: 1.80 m (5 ft 11 in)
- Position: Goalkeeper

Youth career
- 2012–2016: SSB Mitra Surabaya
- 2017–2018: Frenz United

Senior career*
Years	Team	Apps	(Gls)
2018	Persiga Trenggalek	10	(0)
2019–2022	Persela Lamongan	1	(0)
- * Club domestic league appearances and goals as of 10 February 2022

Mochammad Rio Agata (born 27 November 1999) is an Indonesian professional footballer who plays as a goalkeeper.

== Club career ==
=== Persela Lamongan ===
He was signed for Persela Lamongan to play in Liga 1 in the 2019 season. Rio made his league debut on 10 February 2022 in a match against Persebaya Surabaya at the Ngurah Rai Stadium, Denpasar.

== Career statistics ==
=== Club ===
As of 10 February 2022.

Club	Season	League			Cup		Continental		Other		Total	
Club	Season	Division	Apps	Goals	Apps	Goals	Apps	Goals	Apps	Goals	Apps	Goals
Persela Lamongan	2019	Liga 1	0	0	0	0	–		0	0	0	0
Persela Lamongan	2020	Liga 1	0	0	0	0	–		0	0	0	0
Persela Lamongan	2021	Liga 1	1	0	0	0	–		0	0	1	0
Career total			1	0	0	0	0	0	0	0	1	0
