= Adventure Game Toolkit =

The Adventure Game Toolkit (AGT) is a development system for text based adventure games.

== Description ==
It was written in 1987 by David Malmberg, based on Mark J. Welch's 1985 Generic Adventure Game System (GAGS). AGT was produced until 1992, after which time it was released as freeware (the final version is AGT 1.7). AGT was originally built for MS-DOS but has also been compiled for Windows, Macintosh, Amiga, and others.

Numerous games were created using AGT, mostly interactive fiction, but also at least one serious game in the form of an experimental medical simulation. From 1989 until 1993, Malmberg ran an annual contest for AGT games, a predecessor to the Interactive Fiction Competition. Two games that won the AGT contest, CosmoServe in 1991 and Shades of Gray in 1992, written by IF author, Judith Pintar, are canonical in the early history of IF. The Internet Archive maintains an extensive collection of AGT games.

== Reception ==
Scorpia of Computer Gaming World called it, "essentially, a sophisticated compiler", lamenting its lack of an in-game editor while praising the meta-language which allows a user to create "remarkably complex and sophisticated games in a fairly simple way".

== See also ==
- Inform
- TADS
- Hugo
