= Aldrington railway station =

Railway station in East Sussex, England

Coordinates: 50°50′11″N 0°10′54″W

Aldrington
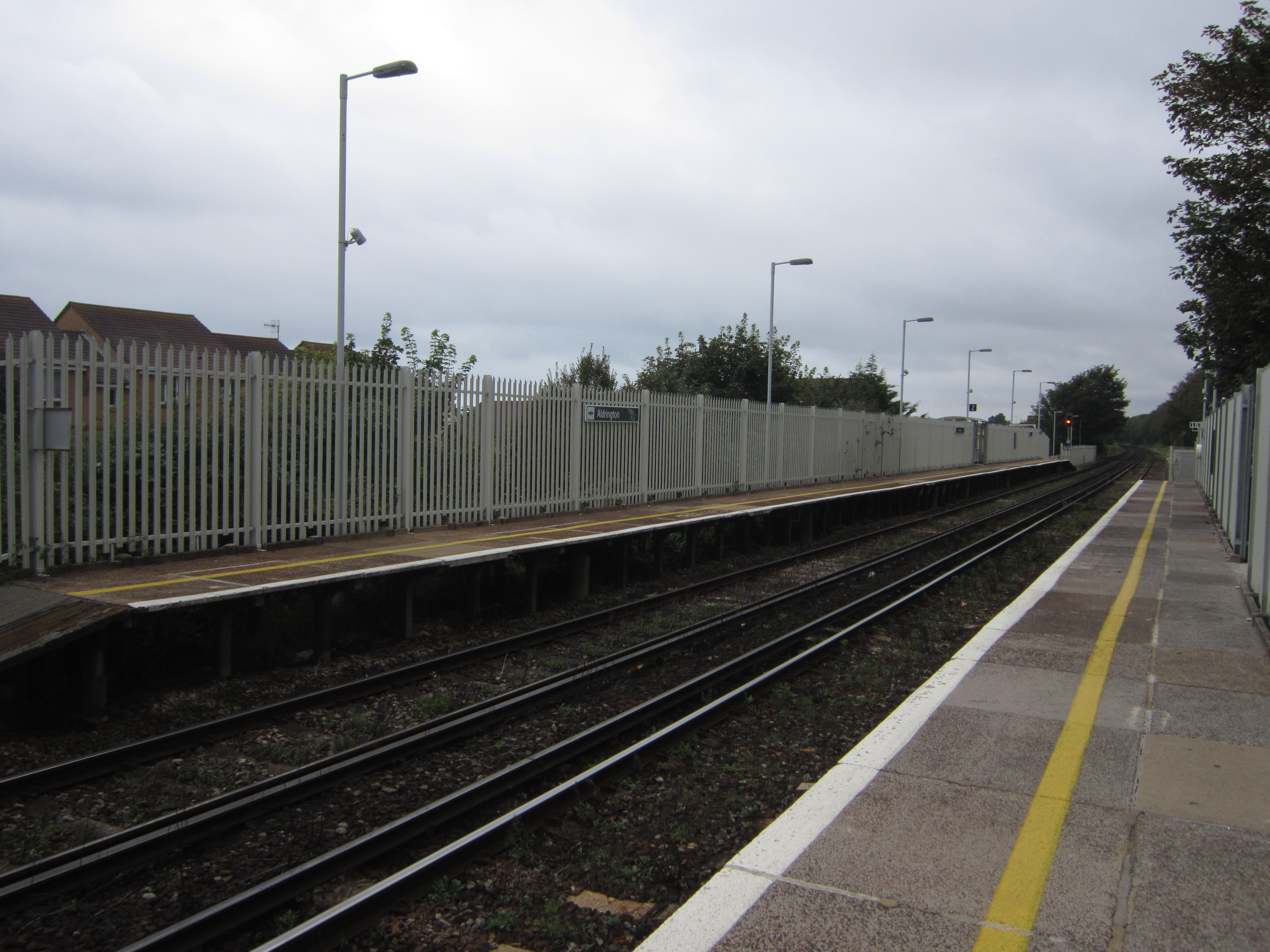
- Westward view from the eastbound platform at Aldrington

General information
- Location: Hove, Brighton & Hove; England
- Grid reference: TQ281056
- Manager: Southern
- Platforms: 2

Other information
- Station code: AGT
- Classification: DfT category F1

Key dates
- 3 September 1905: opened as Dyke Jn Halt
- 17 June 1932: resited and renamed Aldrington Halt

Passengers
- 2020/21: ▼58,282
- 2021/22: ▲0.123 million
- 2022/23: ▲0.128 million
- 2023/24: ▲0.140 million
- 2024/25: ▲0.170 million
Location
Notes
- Passenger statistics from the Office of Rail and Road

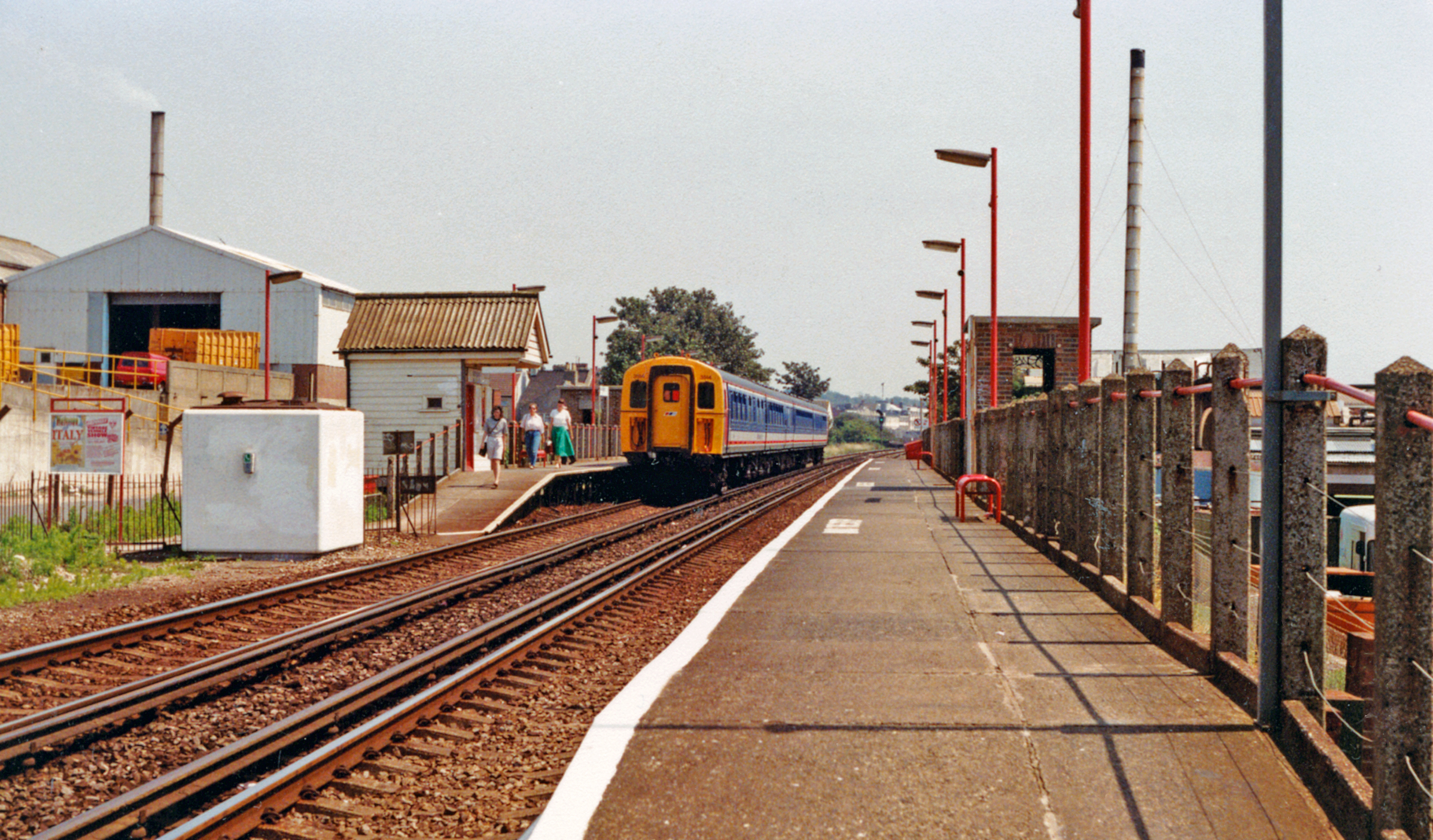
View eastward, towards Hove and Brighton

Aldrington railway station, sometimes known by its former names of Aldrington Halt and Dyke Junction, is a railway station that serves the area of Aldrington in Brighton and Hove, in East Sussex, England. The station is 1 mile 74 chains (3.1 km) from Brighton on the West Coastway Line.

Dyke Junction Halt was opened in 1905 by the London, Brighton and South Coast Railway with short wooden platforms. In 1932 new longer platforms were constructed on an adjacent site nearer Hove to the previous platforms. They were renamed Aldrington Halt and later rebuilt in concrete by the Southern Railway. It is situated just east of the former junction with the branch line to Devil's Dyke, which opened in 1887 and closed in 1939; the layout and curvature of certain roads and buildings immediately north-west of the station indicates where the branch ran.

The station was staffed during peak hours until approximately 1990, after which the hut which served as a ticket office was demolished. By 2009 the old concrete shelters had been replaced with reinforced plastic shelters which are now the only features on the platforms. Ramps lead down to street level.

There are ticket-issuing machines at the entrances to each platform. Pre-purchased tickets can also be collected on these machines. There is no footbridge connecting the platforms with each other. However, there is a tunnel under the railway lines at the western end of the platforms which was originally built to allow the local farmer to move his cattle between fields which became separated with the arrival of the railway.

== History ==
Opened by the London, Brighton and South Coast Railway, it became part of the Southern Railway during the Grouping of 1923. The line then passed on to the Southern Region of British Railways on nationalisation in 1948.

When Sectorisation was introduced, the station was served by Network SouthEast until the privatisation of British Rail.

== Services ==
All services at Aldrington are operated by Southern using Class 377 EMUs.

The typical off-peak service in trains per hour is:

- 1 tph to Brighton
- 1 tph to Chichester via Littlehampton

During the peak hours, additional services call at the station, including services to Portsmouth & Southsea

The typical service on Sundays is:

- 2 tph to Brighton
- 1 tph to Portsmouth Harbour
- 1 tph to Southampton Central

Preceding station	National Rail	Following station
Hove	Southern West Coastway Line	Portslade
	Disused railways	
Hove	London, Brighton and South Coast Railway Brighton and Dyke Railway	Rowan Halt
