= Worthing (disambiguation) =

Worthing is a seaside town in West Sussex, England.

Worthing may also refer to:

== Places ==
- Worthing, Christ Church, Barbados, a community in Christ Church, Barbados
- Worthing, Norfolk, UK
- Worthing, South Dakota, US
- Worthing railway station, in Worthing, West Sussex

== Other ==
- Worthing (UK Parliament constituency)
- Worthing F.C., an association football club based in Worthing, West Sussex
- Worthing F.C. Women, an association football club based in Worthing, West Sussex
- The Worthing series, a series of science fiction works by Orson Scott Card
- HMS Worthing, ships of the British Royal Navy
- SS Worthing, a steam ferry operating across the English Channel between Newhaven and Dieppe
- Helen Lee Worthing (1905–1948), American actress in the early 20th century
- Frank Worthing (1866–1910), American stage actor
- Jack Worthing, a character in Oscar Wilde's The Importance of Being Earnest
- Jason Worthing, a character in Orson Scott Card's The Worthing Chronicle and The Worthing Saga

== See also ==
- Worthing High School (disambiguation)
- Worting (disambiguation)
- Worthington (disambiguation)
