= Holland Road Halt railway station =

Former railway station in England

Holland Road Halt
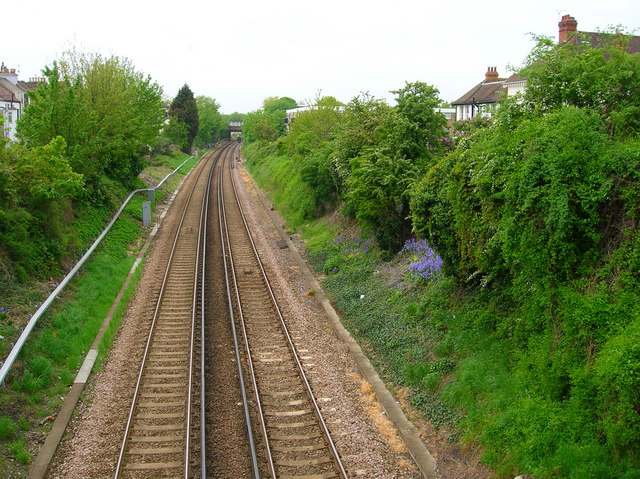
- Site of Holland Road Halt

General information
- Location: Hove, Brighton and Hove; England
- Coordinates: 50.83302°N 0.15959°W
- Platforms: 2

Other information
- Status: Disused

History
- Original company: London, Brighton and South Coast Railway
- Post-grouping: Southern Railway

Key dates
- 3 September 1905: Opened
- 7 May 1956: Closed
Location

Holland Road Halt was a railway station in Hove, East Sussex, which opened in 1905 and closed in 1956. It lay to the west of the original Hove station (1840–1880) and to the east of the current station of that name (1865–present) as well as the Cliftonville Curve. It was mainly used during rush hours by stopping trains to Worthing.

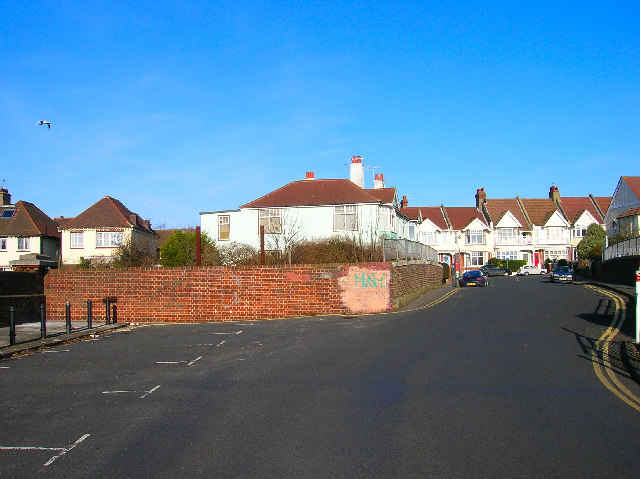
Holland Road Railway Bridge

== History ==
The station had the status of a halt and opened on 3 September 1905 on the west side of the bridge carrying Holland Road over the West Coastway Line. It was one of a series of halts opened by the London, Brighton and South Coast Railway (LBSCR) on the West Coastway line between Brighton and Worthing for its new railmotor service which sought to "counteract the adverse effect the new electric tramways were having" on passenger numbers. Other halts were opened at Dyke Junction, Fishersgate, Bungalow Town and Ham Bridge. Services commenced on 3 September 1905 and the single-coach units were successful in raising traffic figures.

Holland Road Halt was situated just west of the overbridge at the west end of Holland Road goods yard which closed on 14 June 1971. The site of the station corresponded roughly to that of the original Hove station which closed in 1880. The halt was built with timber platforms, which it retained until its closure, and also had wooden steps from the overbridge to the platforms. In February 1956, British Railways proposed closing the station because passenger numbers were low, and the last day of service was 7 May 1956. By this time, only the all-stations trains to West Worthing and a small number of peak-hour services to and from Horsham via Shoreham-by-Sea called there.

Preceding station	Historical railways	Following station
Hove; Line and station open	London, Brighton and South Coast Railway; West Coastway Line	Brighton; Line and station open
