= East Worthing railway station =

Railway station in West Sussex, England

Coordinates: 50°49′18″N 0°21′18″W

East Worthing
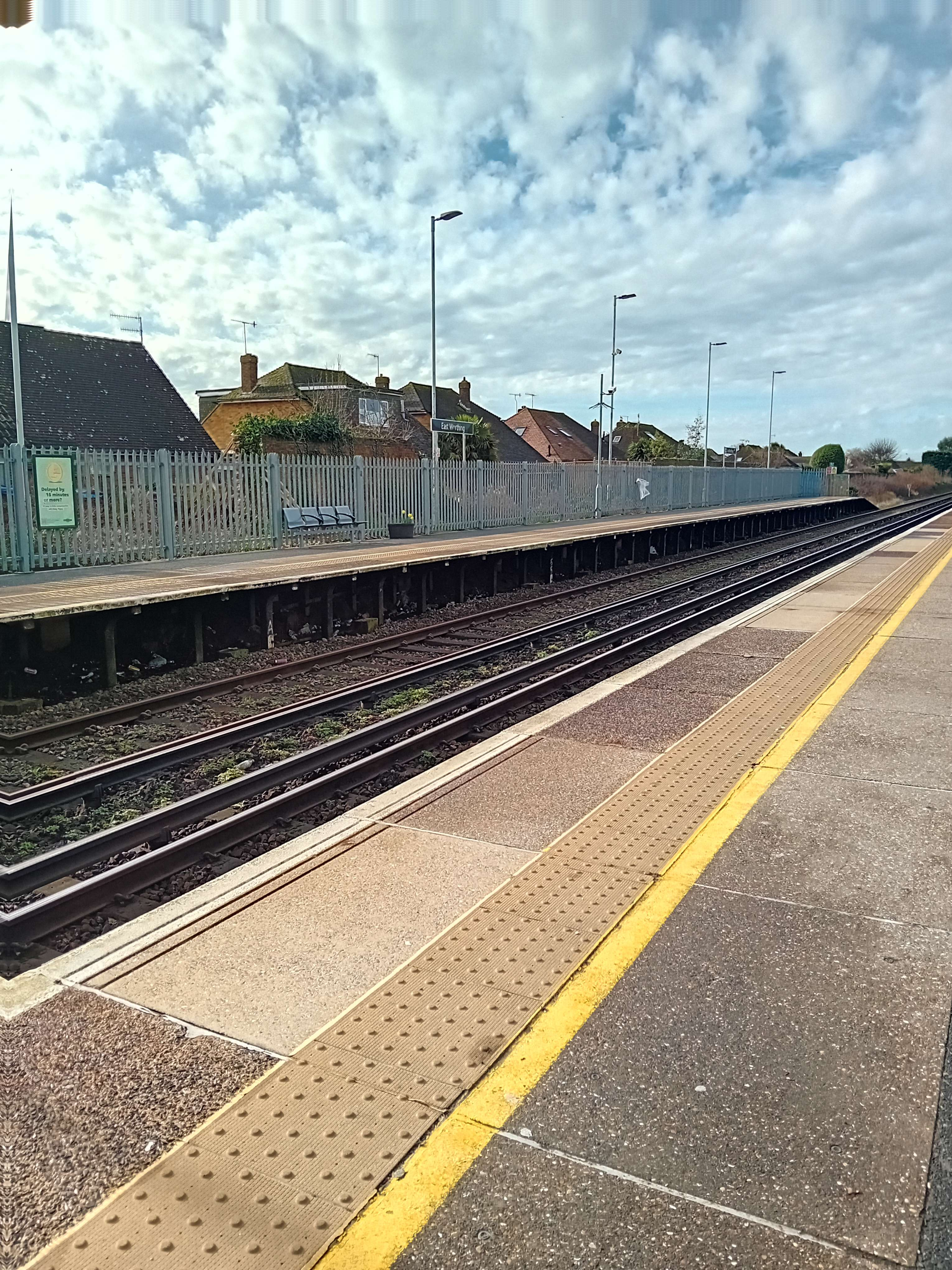
- East Worthing station, platform 2 (February 2024)

General information
- Location: East Worthing Station, Dominion Road, Worthing, West Sussex BN14 8JX; Worthing, Worthing; England
- Grid reference: TQ159037
- Manager: Southern
- Platforms: 2

Other information
- Station code: EWR
- Classification: DfT category F1

Key dates
- 3 September 1905: Opened (Ham Bridge Halt)
- 23 May 1949: Renamed (East Worthing Halt)
- 5 May 1969: Renamed (East Worthing)

Passengers
- 2020/21: ▼0.154 million
- 2021/22: ▲0.342 million
- 2022/23: ▲0.361 million
- 2023/24: ▲0.386 million
- 2024/25: ▲0.471 million
Location
Notes
- Passenger statistics from the Office of Rail and Road

East Worthing railway station is one of five stations serving the town of Worthing in the county of West Sussex - alongside Worthing, West Worthing, Durrington-on-Sea, and Goring-by-Sea. It is 9 miles 55 chains (15.6 km) down the line from Brighton. The station is operated by Southern, who operate all of the services.

The unstaffed station has ticket issuing facilities through one Shere FASTticket self-service ticket machine on the eastbound platform. Between 2001 and 2006 a small wooden ticket office building on the eastbound platform was demolished. The ticket office had previously caught fire in 1997.

The platforms can only accommodate 4-coach trains. Until 2014 they were 2.25 m (7 ft 5 in) wide, preventing the use of access ramps for disabled passengers; but in January of that year work began to widen them to 3.75 m (12.3 ft). This work was scheduled for completion in May of that year.

East Worthing has 2 platforms. Platform one serves trains towards Brighton/London Victoria via Hove, and platform two, which serves trains towards Portsmouth & Southsea / Southampton Central.

== History ==
Opened by the London, Brighton & South Coast Railway in 1905 as Ham Bridge Halt when the LB&SCR introduced 'motor', or 'Push-Pull' trains which served newly opened railway 'halts', as well as existing stations, between Brighton and Worthing. Other halts were opened at Holland Road, Dyke Junction, Fishersgate, and Bungalow Town. Built to serve the growing settlement at East Worthing, the original station name reflected the name of the road bridge at the eastern end. The renaming from Ham Bridge Halt to East Worthing Halt took place in September 1949. A further renaming to just East Worthing was instigated when British Rail stopped using the term 'Halt' from the timetable that commenced during May 1969.

== Services ==
All services at East Worthing are operated by Southern using Class 377 (or occasionally Class 387) EMUs.

The service pattern, following the May 2026 timetable change, is as follows (in trains per hour):

- 2tph to Brighton
- 1tph to Portsmouth Harbour
- 1tph to Chichester

Additional services call at the station during peak hours (weekdays only), with 2tpwd to Southampton Central, 2tpwd to London Victoria, and 3tpwd to Littlehampton.

An additional night service calls at the station, terminating at West Worthing

Preceding station	National Rail	Following station
Lancing	Southern West Coastway Line	Worthing
