= British Rail Class 313 =

1976 British electric trains

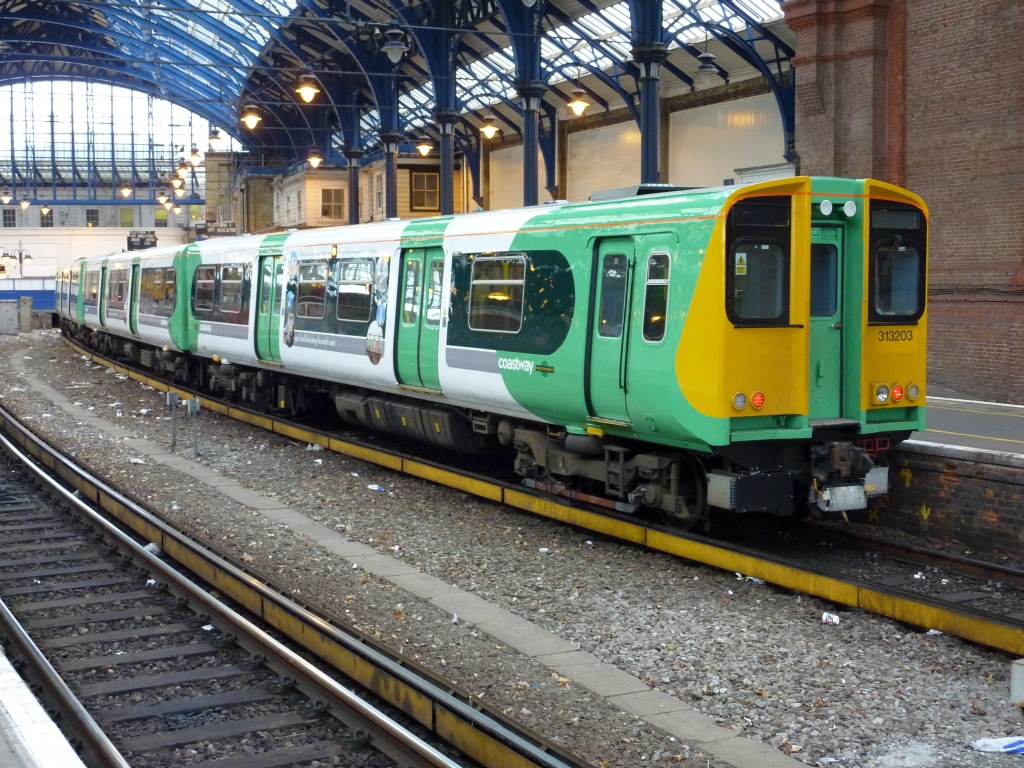
- Southern Class 313 at Brighton in 2010

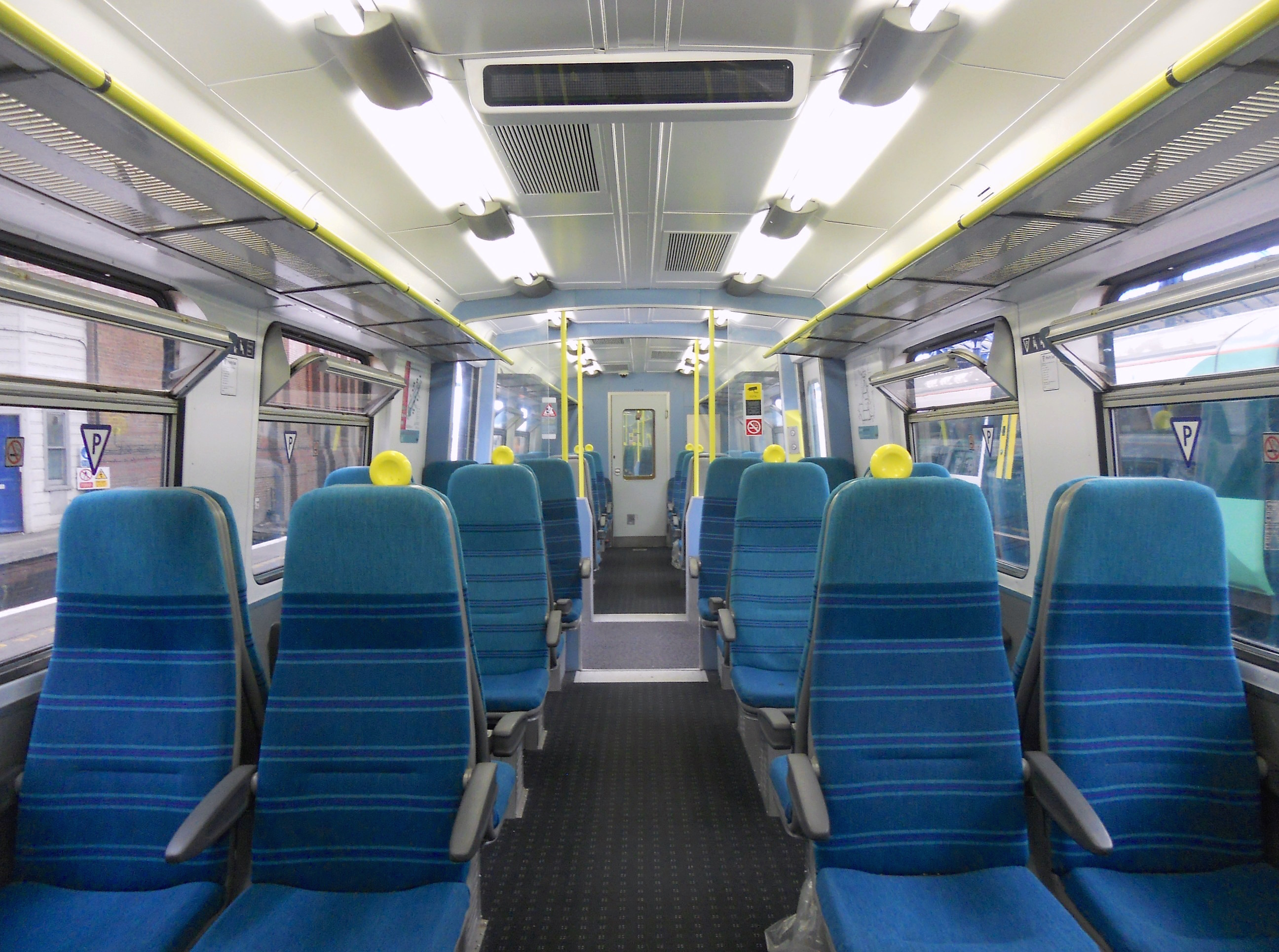
- Interior of a Southern refurbished Class 313/2 unit
- In service: 1976–2023
- Manufacturer: British Rail Engineering Limited
- Built at: Holgate Road Works, York
- Family name: BREL 1972
- Replaced: Class 105; Class 106; Class 501; Class 377/3
- Constructed: 1976–1977
- Refurbished: 1997–2001 (Silverlink); 1999–2003 (WAGN); 2010–2011 (Southern)
- Scrapped: 2019, 2023
- Number built: 64
- Number preserved: 2
- Number scrapped: 62
- Successor: Class 378 (London Overground); Class 717 (Great Northern); Class 377 (Southern)
- Formation: 3 cars per unit: DMSO-PTSO-BDMSO
- Diagram: DMSO vehicles: EA204; TSO vehicles: EH210; BDMSO vehicles: EI201
- Fleet numbers: As built: 313001–313064
- Capacity: As built: 232 seats; Great Northern: 231 seats; Overground: 202 seats; Silverlink: 228 seats; Southern: 202 seats
- Owners: Beacon Rail; Eversholt Rail Group
- Operators: British Rail; Network Rail; Network SouthEast; Silverlink; London Overground; West Anglia Great Northern; First Capital Connect; Great Northern; Southern
- Depots: Hornsey; Lovers Walk (Brighton); Clacton
- Lines served: East Coastway; Great Northern; North London; Seaford Branch; West Coastway; West London

Specifications
- Car body construction: Steel underframe with aluminium body and roof (Note: Diagram EA204 0B additionally describes a variant of the DMSO car with a steel body, instead of aluminium.)
- Car length: DM vehs.: 19.800 m (64 ft 11.5 in); Trailers: 19.920 m (65 ft 4.3 in)
- Width: 2.820 m (9 ft 3.0 in)
- Height: 3.582 m (11 ft 9.0 in)
- Floor height: 1.146 m (3 ft 9.1 in)
- Doors: Double-leaf pocket sliding, each 1.288 m (4 ft 2.7 in) wide (2 per side per car)
- Wheel diameter: 840 mm (33 in) new
- Wheelbase: Over bogie centres: 14.170 m (46 ft 5.9 in)
- Maximum speed: 75 mph (120 km/h)
- Weight: DMSO vehs.: 35.87 t (35.30 LT; 39.54 ST); PTSO vehs.: 31.28 t (30.79 LT; 34.48 ST); BDMSO vehs.: 37.55 t (36.96 LT; 41.39 ST); Total: 104.70 t (103.05 LT; 115.41 ST)
- Traction motors: 8 × GEC G310AZ (82 kW (110 hp) each, 4 per motor car)
- Power output: 656 kW (880 hp)
- Tractive effort: 90.7 kN (20,400 lb_{f}) starting
- Acceleration: 0.79 m/s^{2} (2.6 ft/s^{2})
- Deceleration: 0.92 m/s^{2} (3.0 ft/s^{2})
- Electric systems: Overhead line, 25 kV 50 Hz AC (Note: Removed on 313/2 units.); Third rail, 750 V DC
- Current collection: Pantograph (AC); Contact shoe (DC)
- UIC classification: Bo′Bo′+2′2′+Bo′Bo′
- Bogies: BREL BX1
- Minimum turning radius: 70.4 m (231 ft 0 in)
- Braking systems: Electro-pneumatic (disc) and rheostatic; ('Westcode' three-step)
- Safety systems: AWS; TPWS; Tripcock (NCL units only)
- Coupling system: Tightlock
- Multiple working: Within class
- Track gauge: 1,435 mm (4 ft 8 1/2 in) standard gauge

Notes/references
- Specifications as at August 1982 except where otherwise noted.

The British Rail Class 313 is a class of dual-voltage electric multiple units (EMU) suburban and regional passenger trains. Built by British Rail Engineering Limited at Holgate Road carriage works between February 1976 and April 1977, they were the first production units that were derived from British Rail's 1971 prototype suburban EMU design which, as the BREL 1972 family, eventually encompassed 755 vehicles over five production classes (313, 314, 315, 507 and 508). They were the first second-generation EMUs to be constructed for British Rail and the first British Rail units with both a pantograph for 25 kV 50 Hz AC overhead lines and contact shoe equipment for 750 V DC third rail supply. They were, additionally, the first units in Britain to employ multi-function automatic Tightlock couplers, which include electrical and pneumatic connections allowing the coupling and uncoupling of units to be performed unassisted by the driver whilst in the cab.

The Class 313 units were the oldest EMUs operating on the National Rail network in Great Britain prior to their withdrawal in 2023, having entered service in 1976. However, the even older 1972 Stock and 1973 Stock are still in service on London Underground.

== Background ==
Two new fleets were ordered as part of the electrification, authorised in 1971, of suburban services on British Rail's Great Northern route between London King's Cross and Royston, via Welwyn Garden City on the East Coast Main Line and via Hertford North on the Hertford Loop Line. For outer-suburban services – those making limited stops over the length of the route – a fleet of 49 Class 312 units were procured as derivatives of the proven Class 310 design. The Class 313 fleet was correspondingly ordered for the inner-suburban services – those making frequent stops between London and Welwyn or Hertford.

An integral component of the electrification programme was BR's acquisition from London Underground of the Northern City Line, which had been built at a size sufficient for mainline trains and which provided the most direct route between Finsbury Park, on the existing Great Northern route, and Moorgate in the City of London. Following completion of the electrification to Welwyn and Hertford, the London terminal for all inner-suburban services would switch from King's Cross to Moorgate, reducing the number of train movements at the former station enough to permit the remodelling and subsequent electrification of the complicated approach tracks. The Northern City Line tunnels, however, were still not large enough to be fitted with the same 25 kV 50 Hz AC overhead line electrification system used for the rest of programme, and were instead configured to use the 750 V DC third rail system standard on BR's Southern Region. This in turn required that a new design of EMU be developed for the Class 313 order, as none capable of running on both systems existed at the time.

Given this requirement, the opportunity was taken to further develop the Class 445 and 446 prototypes that had been produced by British Rail Engineering Limited in 1971, and which were considered by BR to be "the basis of all [its] future suburban stock". As these prototypes had been configured for use only on third-rail electrification, a new intermediate trailer carrying a pantograph and AC to DC transformer was built and inserted into the two-car Class 446 prototype, which was then tested on AC-electrified track for six months in 1975. This three-car arrangement, with driving-motor vehicles 'sandwiching' the trailer carrying the AC collection equipment, was subsequently adopted as the basic layout for the Class 313 design.

== Description ==
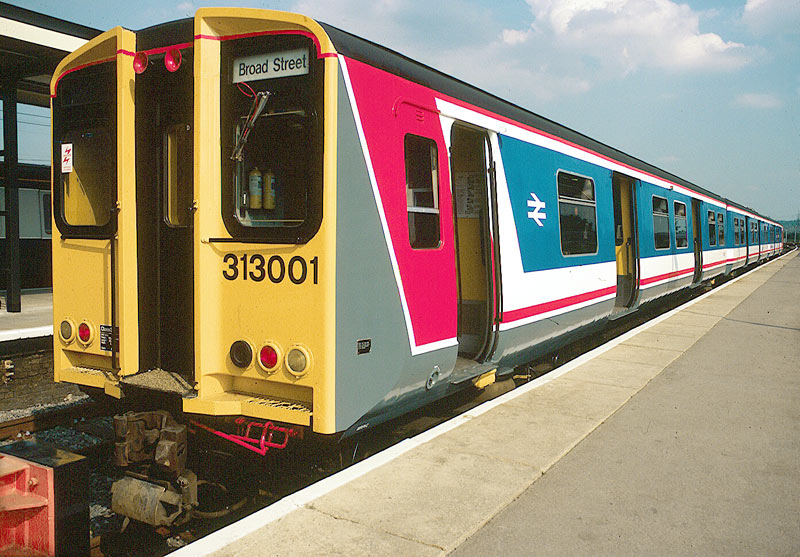
The first Class 313 unit, 313001, in the late 1980s at Watford Junction in Network SouthEast livery

Given the need to use the Northern City Line tunnels, Class 313 units were built to a slightly smaller loading gauge than conventional trains. They were of standard length and width, but the roof was lower, which was most noticeable due to the lack of a "well" for the Stone Faiveley AMBR pantograph on the centre coach. They had to comply with regulations for underground trains, such as having doors at each end of the train for evacuation onto the tracks, and when on 750 V DC supply the traction supply for each motor coach was separate, whereas on conventional 750 V DC trains each coach in a unit is linked by a 750 V bus line. Due to this, each motor coach had shoe gear on both bogies, whereas normally it would only be on the leading bogie. They were fitted with trip-cocks that are struck by a raised train-stop arm at red signals and will apply the brakes if the train passes one.

The units were originally numbered 313001–313064. Each unit was formed of two outer driving motors and an intermediate trailer with a pantograph. This was a reversal of the practice started in the 1960s, where the motors and pantograph were on an intermediate vehicle, with the outer vehicles being driving trailers. Part of the reason was to simplify the equipment to allow dual-voltage operation, and to keep down weight by spreading the heavy transformer and motors between vehicles. The intermediate trailer carried the pantograph and a transformer and rectifier, which on 25 kV AC provides 750 V DC to the motor coaches, each of which had four 110 horsepower (82 kW) GEC G310AZ direct current traction motors, two per bogie. On 750 V DC each motor coach drew its supply directly through its shoe gear. The traction motors were driven by a camshaft-controlled resistance system with series and parallel motor groupings and weak field steps. Originally the heating in the motor coaches was provided by passing air over the hot traction and braking resistors in addition to conventional heaters, but this feature was later taken out of use and the pneumatic dampers were disabled. Great Northern and Southern retrofitted their units with cab air conditioning.

313s had rheostatic braking (which was disabled on London Overground) in addition to conventional three-step air-operated disc braking. During braking if wheelslide was detected by the Wheel slide protection (WSP), rheostatic braking was disabled and disc-braking only was used. Great Northern units had sanding equipment. Unlike some other DMU/EMU classes, additional brake force was not available when the emergency brake application was initiated and was the equivalent force of a step 3/full service application. WSP was still active when making an emergency application.

In addition to the primary suspension of rubber chevron spring and oil dampers, secondary suspension was provided by two air bellows per bogie - flow into each bellows was controlled independently by a levelling valve and arm assembly that allowed the suspension to inflate/deflate when the weight of the coach was increased or decreased by passenger loading. The air suspension was linked to the braking system via a Variable Load Valve (VLV), which increased air brake pressure when the coach was more heavily loaded to compensate for the additional weight.

All units had standard class seating only.

As built, the sliding doors were opened by the passengers. Once the driver had stopped the train and the guard had activated the master door release, a passenger could move the door handle gently sideways which operated a switch controlling the individual door opening circuit. Many people did not wait for the guard's release and gave the handle a much harder tug, which could force the door open even if the train had not stopped. Concerns over passenger safety rapidly led to removal of the handles, after which the guard had sole control of the doors. Passenger-operated push-buttons were provided as replacements for the removed handles from March 1977 onwards.

Modifications led to renumbering and reclassification. All units originally had shoebeams on the inner bogie of each motor coach, which was sufficient for third-rail duties between Drayton Park and Moorgate. Some units became surplus, and in 1987 four were transferred to the Colchester – Clacton/Walton route, which has no DC sections; they had the shoegear removed, and were renumbered from 313061–313064 to 313096–313099. Following an accident involving one unit at Walton-on-the-Naze in August 1987, they were replaced by Class 310 units in 1988. Units 313001–313016 had shoegear fitted to the outer bogies in addition, and were transferred to the Euston – Watford DC route where there are long gaps in the third rail. They were renumbered into a new 313/1 subclass, leaving the unmodified units in subclass 313/0.

Following the privatisation of British Rail, ownership of the Class 313 fleet passed to leasing company Eversholt Rail Group. In June 2012 Eversholt sold twenty units (313121 and the nineteen 313/2 units) to newly formed lessor Beacon Rail.

== Operations ==
=== Network Rail ===
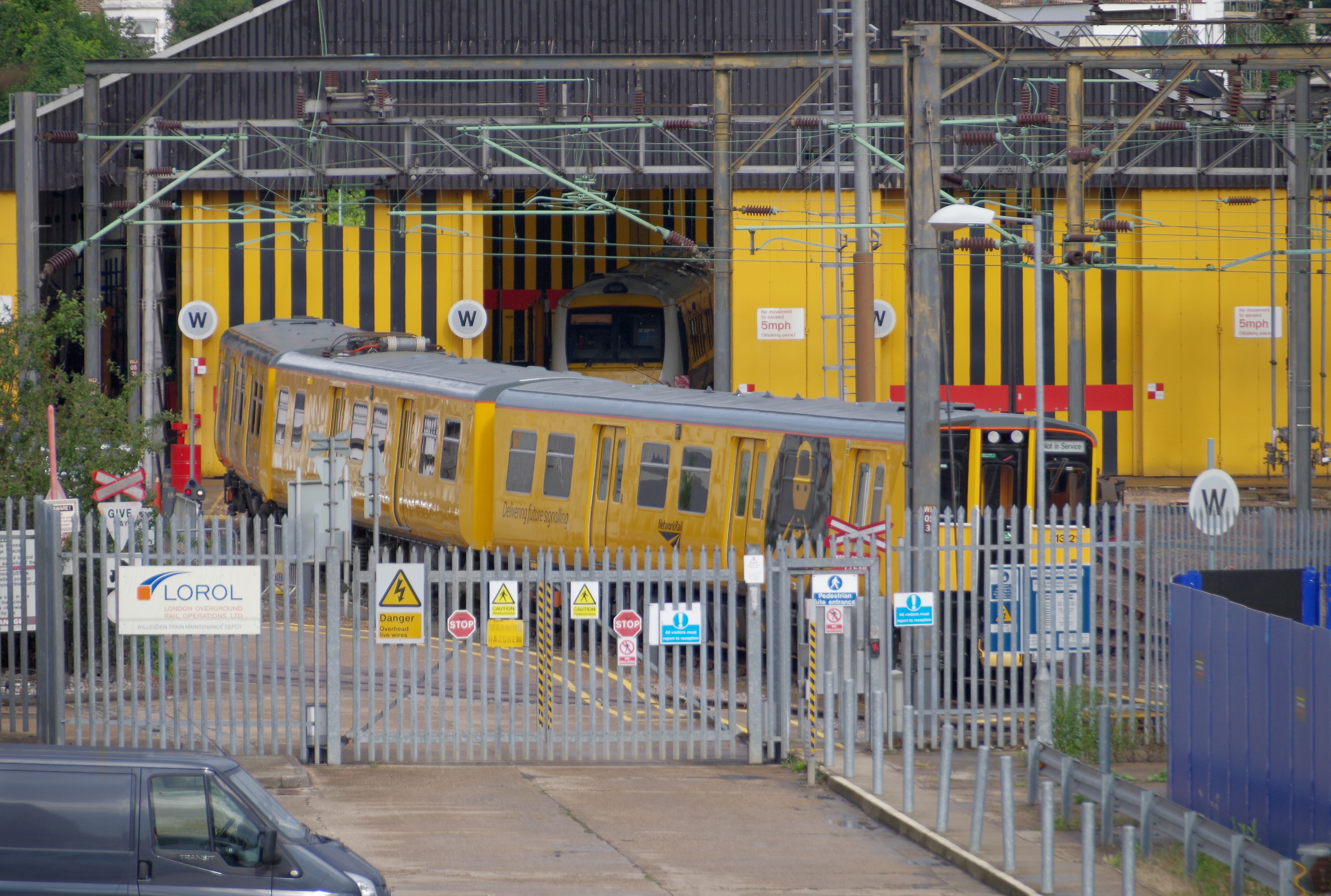
Network Rail's ERTMS test train in the sidings at Willesden TMD

Network Rail leased Beacon Rail-owned unit 313121 as a test vehicle for the European Rail Traffic Management System (ERTMS) installation on the Hertford Loop.

The unit was repainted into Network Rail's yellow house colours and internally refurbished at Alstom's Wembley Intercity Depot, to include a new driving desk, technician's workstation, kitchen and toilet facilities, and the necessary ERTMS equipment. The work was completed in June 2013 and the unit was tested for the first time on Friday 5 July 2013 between Wembley and Bletchley. It commenced testing on the Hertford Loop later that month. Following conclusion of the Hertford Loop works, it was placed in store at Eastleigh Works in May 2018. It was expected to be used again when ERTMS was ready for testing on the Great Western Main Line, but Network Rail instead listed the unit for sale by tender in January 2023.

=== Silverlink/London Overground ===
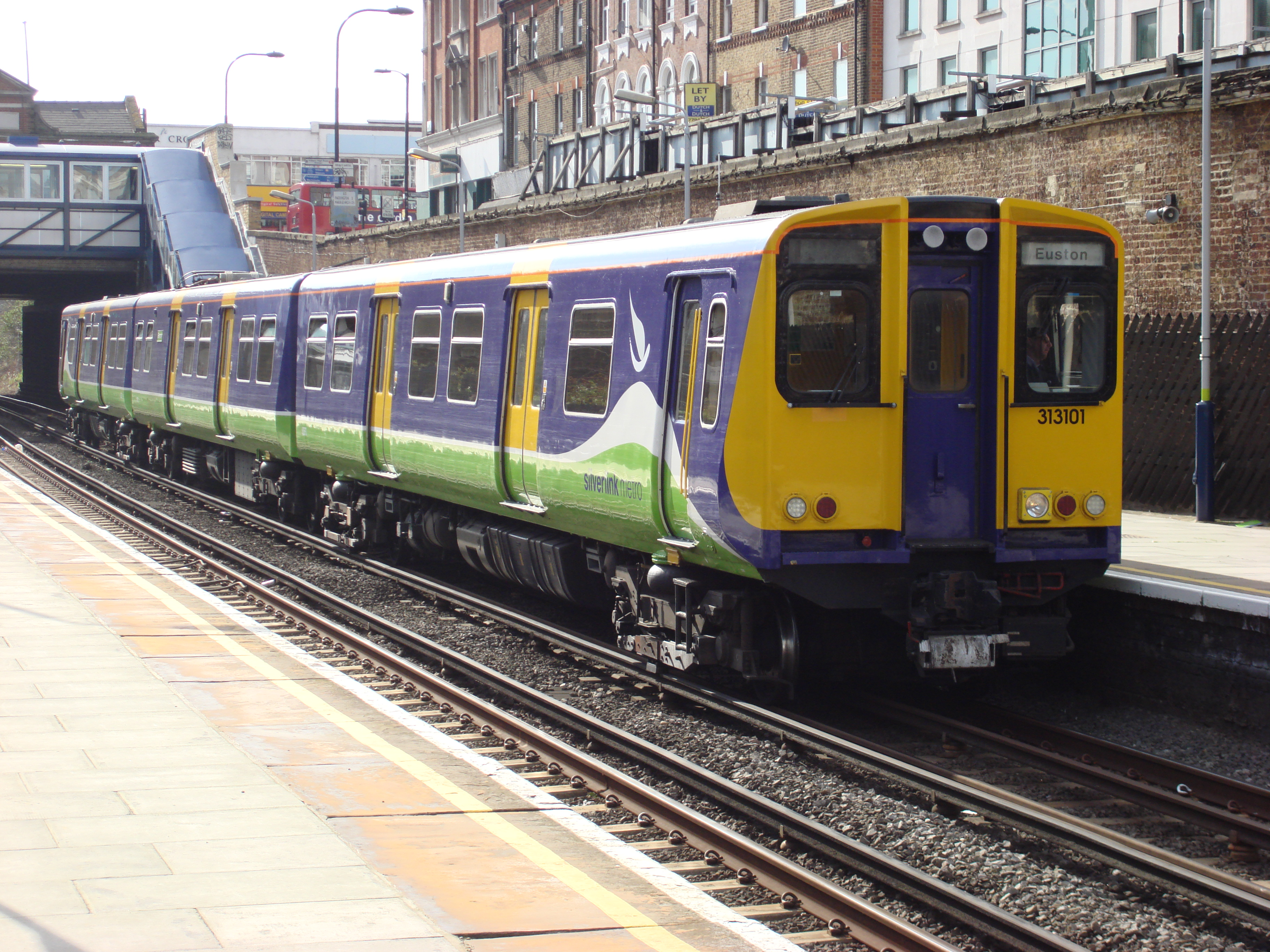
Silverlink Class 313 at Kilburn High Road in 2007

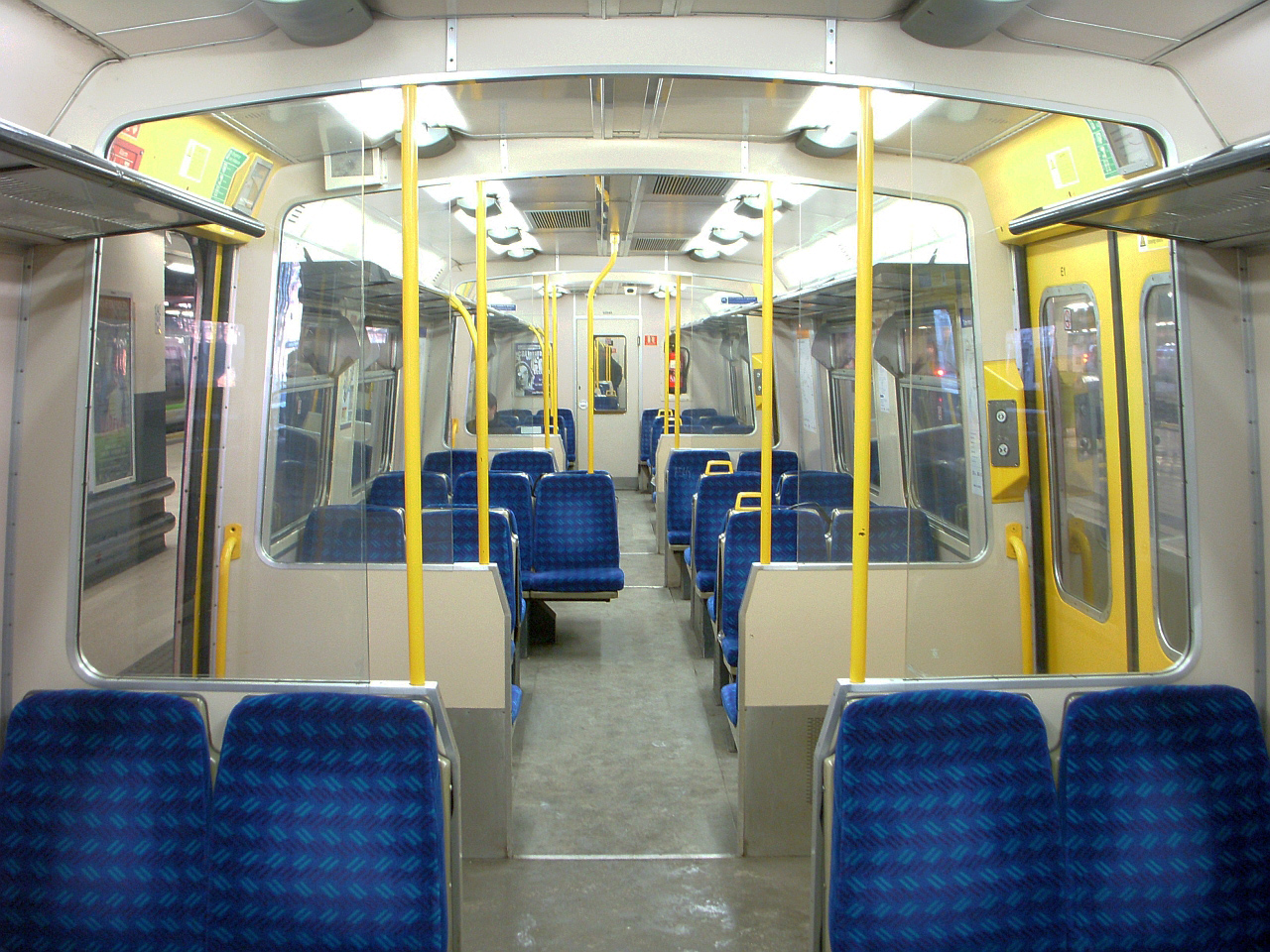
Interior of a London Overground Class 313/1 unit. Additional standing room was created by changing from 5-abreast to 4-abreast seating.

Silverlink inherited 23 units from British Rail. These were mainly operated under the Silverlink Metro brand on the North London, West London, and Watford DC lines, although they were also regularly used on the St Albans Abbey – Watford Junction branch line between 1988 and the end of the Silverlink franchise in 2007.

In 2007 they were used on services transferred to London Overground, which replaced Silverlink Metro. London Overground branding was added, and some seats were removed to provide additional standing room. They were replaced by Class 378 trains, with longitudinal seating to improve standing room.

The final day of scheduled 313 operation on the North and West London Lines was 19 February 2010, although units remained in use as ad-hoc substitutes for unavailable 378/0s. By August 2010 only 313121 and 313123 were still in service with London Overground, as the 378/2 Capitalstars were by then in use on the Watford DC Line. They last ran for London Overground on 13 September 2010.

=== Southern (Govia Thameslink Railway) ===
Nineteen 313s that were displaced by Class 378 Capitalstars on London Overground were transferred to Southern, replacing the newer Class 377/3 Electrostars on East and West Coastway services from Brighton. They primarily operated local services from Brighton to Hove, West Worthing, Portsmouth Harbour, Lewes and Seaford. In addition, they worked the Littlehampton to Bognor Regis and Portsmouth & Southsea services.

These units were repainted at Wolverton Works and renumbered from 313/1 into a new 313/2 subclass. The full refurbishment began in June 2010 at Wabtec Doncaster and included new flooring and carpet, new seating, improved space for cycles and passengers in wheelchairs, and the fitting of a Passenger Information System. Additional modifications were carried out at Stewarts Lane TMD including the installation of cab air-conditioning, sanding equipment, a 750 V busline, shore supply sockets and the removal of overhead line equipment.

The 313s commenced operations with Southern on 23 May 2010, providing a two-trains-per-hour service between Brighton and Seaford, and some trains between Brighton and Lewes, Hove, West Worthing and Littlehampton. From 13 December 2010, their operation expanded to stopping services from Brighton to Portsmouth Harbour and the Littlehampton to Bognor Regis shuttle.

The decision to use 313s on the Coastway lines was controversial, as they were much older and slower than the 377s and were missing certain on-board facilities like air conditioning and toilets. The rail union RMT criticised the move and many publications, including the BBC, questioned the introduction of 35-year-old trains in place of much newer units. These trains were deployed on services that operated predominantly over short distances, such as Brighton to Hove and Brighton to Seaford, and some longer (but stopping) services that provided predominantly local links that ran alongside 377s on faster services. The introduction of 313s on the Coastway routes facilitated the delivery of additional capacity on high-demand suburban routes in South London.

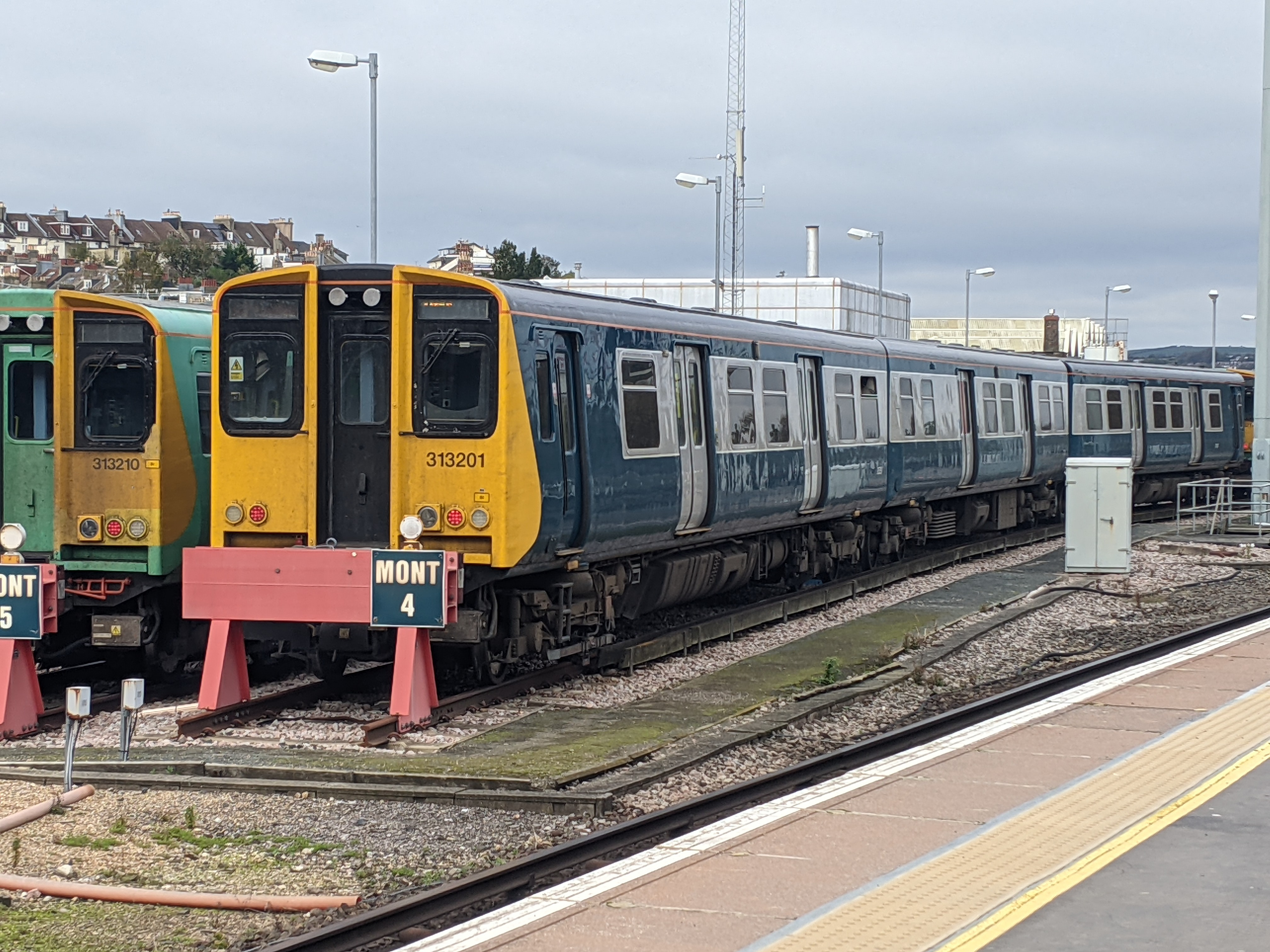
Unit 313201 in British Rail blue, stabled at Brighton station.

In December 2017, it was announced that unit 313201 – originally 313001, the first and oldest Class 313 unit – had been repainted into British Rail's Rail blue livery, as originally used on the units (though, to meet modern accessibility requirements, the passenger doors were painted entirely grey rather than blue and grey as original). The repaint was part of the C6 overhaul, which included works on the doors, air system and interior (including new, modern LED lighting), and bodywork repairs. The Director of Engineering for Beacon Rail, which owned the Class 313s, has said, "We wanted to celebrate the heritage of this special train, so the re-livery made perfect sense."

Southern confirmed in March 2023 that it planned to withdraw the Class 313 fleet at the May 2023 timetable change. Three units – 313202, 313214, and 313217 – had already been removed from service by this point, and on 10 March 2023 they were dispatched for scrapping at Eastleigh Works. A farewell railtour was held on 29 April 2023 using units 313201 and 313213, which raised approximately £25,000 for charity. The final public services with the class operated on Friday 19 May 2023. They were replaced by Class 377 units from Southern's existing fleet.

=== West Anglia Great Northern/First Capital Connect/Great Northern (Govia Thameslink Railway) ===
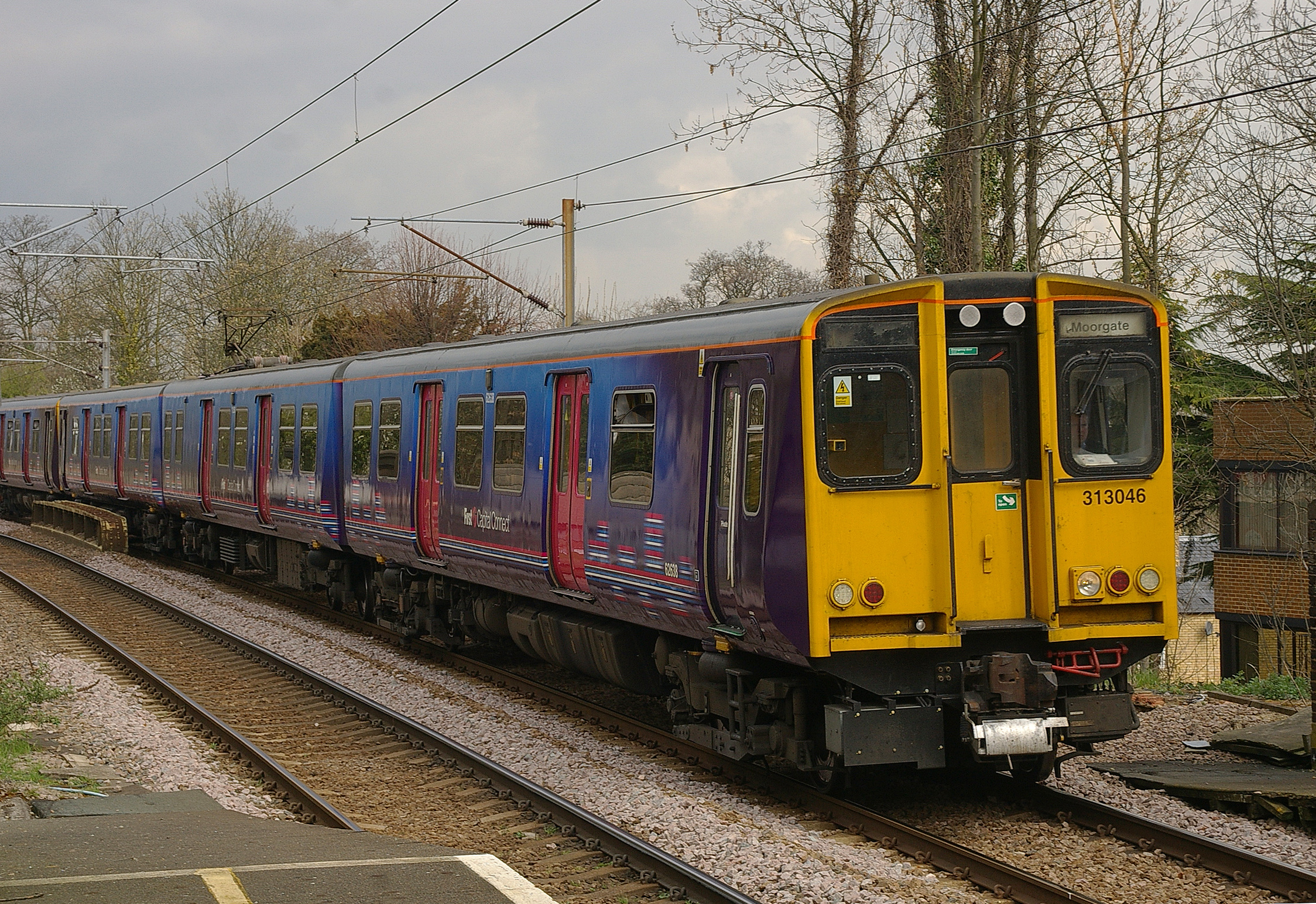
First Capital Connect Class 313 at Enfield Chase in 2009.

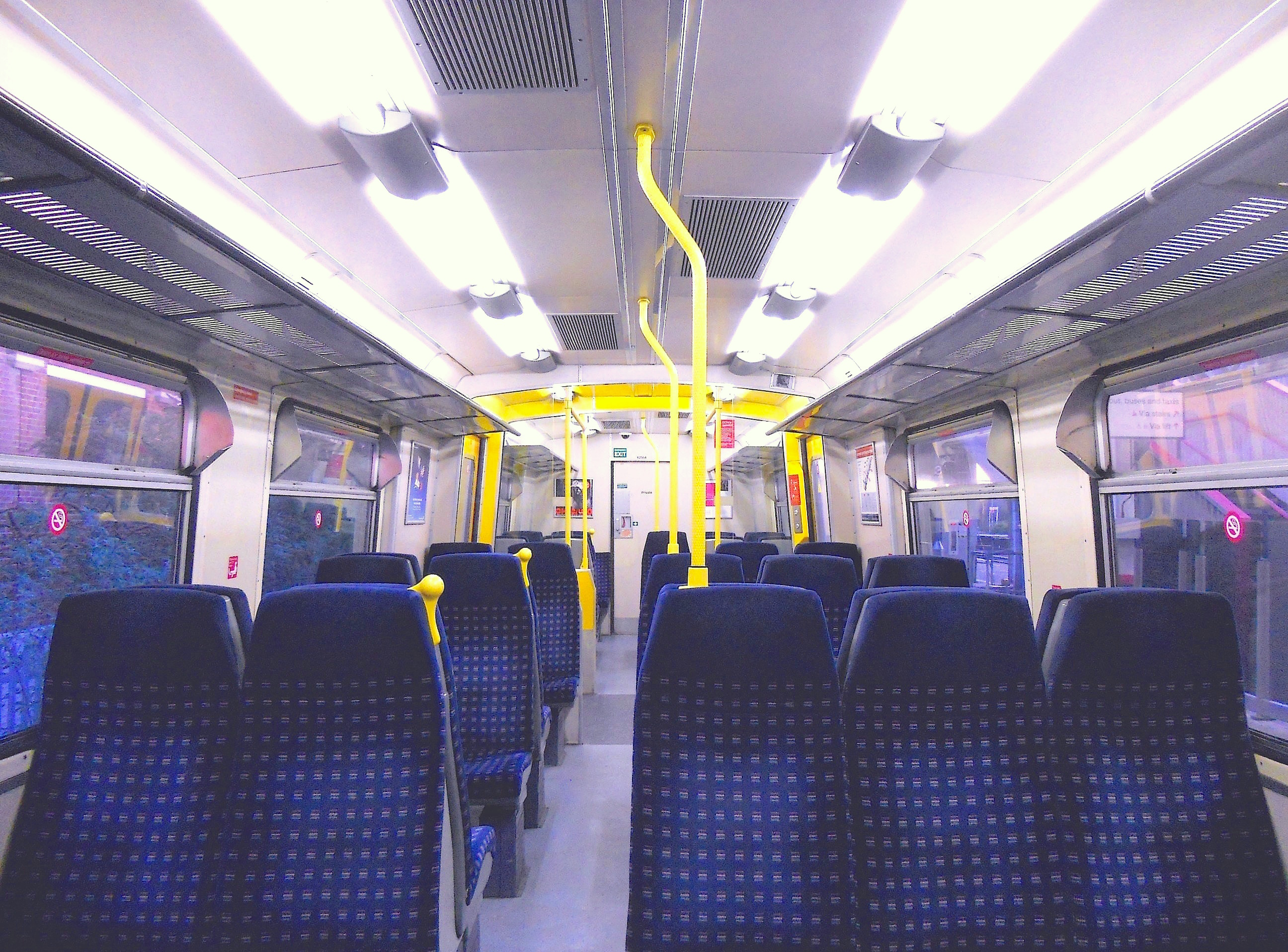
Refreshed interior of a First Capital Connect unit

West Anglia Great Northern inherited 41 units operating inner suburban services out of Moorgate and London King's Cross, to Welwyn Garden City, Hertford North, Stevenage, and Letchworth Garden City. From 1 April 2006 the Great Northern (GN) franchise merged with Thameslink to form the Thameslink Great Northern franchise, which was won by FirstGroup and became known as First Capital Connect. Three Class 313/1 units were transferred to First Capital Connect from London Overground in September 2010 to augment the Class 313/0 fleet. They were repainted into FCC livery and lightly refreshed internally but retained their original low-backed seating. Despite receiving modifications that made them mechanically identical to the 313/0s, they were not renumbered. The units were then transferred to Great Northern on 14 September 2014 when the Thameslink and Great Northern franchise was merged into the Thameslink, Southern and Great Northern franchise.

Although the majority of the route is 25 kV 50 Hz AC overhead line equipment, the Northern City Line route between Moorgate and Drayton Park is 750 V DC third rail, formerly part of the London Underground's Northern line, and although built to full loading gauge there is insufficient clearance to add catenary.

Trains bound for Moorgate approach Drayton Park on a falling gradient, drawing power via the pantograph. After coming to a stand at the platform the driver opens the vacuum circuit breaker, lowers the pantograph and changes over to DC. Whilst at Drayton Park, the starting signal for the platform is held at danger until the pantograph is lowered. Unusually for dual voltage trains, on this stock and its replacement, the Class 717, a shunt resistor is permanently connected to the pantograph. The detection of the small current drawn holds the signal at danger while the pantograph remains in contact with the overhead wire. This current is very audible as it manifests itself as a distinct buzzing noise as an arc is struck and subsequently extinguished as the pantograph lowers. This prevents the driver from powering into the tunnel with the pantograph raised which would cause damage to the train as the pantograph ran off the end of the overhead line and struck the tunnel portal. On journeys from Moorgate traction power is maintained into Drayton Park for the rising gradient. Once the train is at a stand the driver selects AC traction and raises the pantograph. There is no system forcing the driver to change traction supplies beyond the customary 'PANS UP' sign at the end of the platform. If the driver forgets to change to AC no damage will occur to the train or any infrastructure; there will simply be a loss of power as the train runs out of third rail.

Great Northern 313s were electrically limited to 30 mph (50 km/h) in DC mode, the maximum line speed on the Northern City Line. (Note: Bull & Cronin 1978a gives the restriction as being 50 km/h (31 mph).)

313134 was named "City of London" at Moorgate on 9 December 2010 by Michael Bear, the Lord Mayor of London.

The Class 313 units were replaced by a new fleet of Class 717 units, which began to enter service in March 2019. The first Class 313 withdrawal – unit 313026 – occurred the month prior; it was sent for scrapping in April 2019.

The final Class 313 service on Great Northern was the 23:33 Hertford North to Moorgate on 30 September 2019. A final railtour, operating from London King's Cross to Royston (via Welwyn Garden City) and back (via Hertford North and Moorgate) was held on 23 October 2019 with units 313134 and 313064; the DMSO vehicle of 313064 was repainted in Network SouthEast livery.

== Preservation ==
The Railway Heritage Designation Advisory Board had originally designated unit 313201 for potential preservation after retirement, on the grounds that it was the first Class 313 unit built, and by extension the first production PEP-derived unit. However, in early 2023, the board decided instead to designate Network Rail's unit 313121, as unlike 313201 it retains its original seating and dual-voltage running equipment. It is preserved at the Fife Heritage Railway in Scotland.

313201 is preserved by the 400 Series Preservation Group. In November 2025 it was moved to short term storage at the Llanelli & Mynydd Mawr Railway in South Wales.

== Accidents and incidents ==
- On 15 October 1986, unit 313012 ran into the rear of a London Underground empty stock train at Kensal Green due to excessive speed after passing a signal at caution. Twenty-five people were injured.
- On 12 August 1987, unit 313063 overran the buffer stop at Walton-on-the-Naze and demolished the station building due to a brake fault on the train. Thirteen people were injured.
- On 22 October 2020, unit 313212 was derailed at Bognor Regis due to a signalling error.
- On 19 November 2020, unit 313220 was involved in a fire at West Worthing station.
- On 10 March 2021, unit 313203 was involved in a fire at East Worthing station.

== Fleet details ==
| Subclass | Status | Qty. | Year built | Cars per unit | Unit numbers |
|---|---|---|---|---|---|
| 313/0 | Scrapped | 41 | 1976–1977 | 3 | 313018, 313024–313033, 313035–313064 |
| 313/1 | Scrapped | 3 | 1976–1977 | 3 | 313122–313123, 313134 |
| 313/1 | Preserved | 1 | 1976–1977 | 3 | 313121 |
| 313/2 | Preserved | 1 | 1976–1977 | 3 | 313201 |
| 313/2 | Scrapped | 18 | 1976–1977 | 3 | 313202-313217, 313219-313220 |

=== Vehicle numbering ===
Individual vehicles are numbered in the ranges as follows:

| DMSO | PTSO | BDMSO |
|---|---|---|
| 62529–62592 | 71213–71276 | 62593–62656 |

=== Named units ===
The following units carried names:

- 313020 Parliament Hill
- 313054 Captain William Leefe Robinson VC
- 313101 Silvertown
- 313109 Arnold Leah
- 313111 London Travel Watch
- 313116 Nikola Tesla
- 313122 Eric Roberts 1946 - 2012 'The Flying Nottsman'
- 313134 City of London
- 313134 The Hackney Empire
