= Wort (disambiguation) =

Wort is the liquid created by the mashing of malted barley to use in brewing beer.

Wort or Worts may also refer to:

- Wort (plant), plants containing the middle English word wort in their names
- Wört, a town in Baden-Württemberg, Germany

== People ==
- James Worts (1792-1834) British distiller
- James Gooderham Worts (1818-1882) Canadian distiller

== Businesses ==
- WORT, a listener-sponsored community radio station in Madison, Wisconsin
- Wort Hotel, Jackson, Wyoming, USA
- Luxemburger Wort, a daily newspaper in Luxembourg

== See also ==
- St John's wort (disambiguation)
- Worting (disambiguation)
- Woert (disambiguation)
- Wart (disambiguation)
