= Eternity Science Fiction =

- Editor: Stephen Gregg
- Categories: Science fiction magazine
- Frequency: Yearly
- Founded: 1972
- Final issue: 1980
- Country: United States
- Based in: Sandy Springs, South Carolina

Eternity SF, also known as Eternity Science Fiction and Eternity, was a semi-professional science fiction magazine published by Stephen Gregg out of Sandy Springs, South Carolina. The magazine was issued from 1972 to 1975 and was briefly revived from 1979 to 1980. It contained stories from famous writers such as Orson Scott Card, Glen Cook, Philip K. Dick and Roger Zelazny.

== Issues ==
- Eternity SF Vol. 1, No 1 (1972)
- Eternity SF Vol. 1, No 2 (1973)
- Eternity SF Vol. 1, No 3 (1974)
- Eternity SF Vol. 1, No 4 (1975)
- Eternity SF Vol. 1, No 5 (1976)
- Eternity SF Vol. 1, No 1 (1979)
- Eternity SF Vol. 1, No 2 (1980)

== Famous contributors ==
Eternity SF Vol. 1, No 1 (1979)

=== Philip K. Dick ===
Dick's autobiographical essay "Notes Made Late At Night By A Weary SF Writer" appeared in the (1972) issue of Eternity SF. It was later published in The Shifting Realities of Philip K. Dick (1995).

=== Glen Cook ===
Cook's short story "Sunrise" appeared in the (1973) issue of Eternity SF. It takes place in Cook's Starfishers universe.

=== Roger Zelazny ===
Zelazny's short story "A Knight for Merytha" appeared in the (1974) and in the (1979) issues of Eternity SF. It was later published in Zelazny's short story collection Dilvish, the Damned (1982).

=== Orson Scott Card ===
Card's short story "The Tinker" appeared in the (1980) issue of Eternity SF. It was later published in Card's omnibus The Worthing Saga (1990).

== See also ==
- List of defunct American periodicals
