= The Worthing Saga =

1990 book by Orson Scott Card

- First edition
- Author: Orson Scott Card
- Cover artist: Wayne Barlowe
- Language: English
- Series: The Worthing series
- Genre: Science fiction
- Publisher: Tor Books
- Publication date: 1990
- Publication place: United States
- Media type: Print (hardback & paperback)
- Pages: 488 pp
- ISBN: 0-8125-0927-7
- OCLC: 22702527

The Worthing Saga (1990) is a science fiction book by American writer Orson Scott Card, set in the Worthing series. It is made up of the novel The Worthing Chronicle (1982) and nine related stories. Six of the stories are from Card's short story collection Capitol (1979) and the other three are early works, two of them previously unpublished.

== Story list ==
The stories in this book are:

- The Worthing Chronicle (1982) - novel
- Tales of Capitol (1979)
  - "Skipping Stones" (1979)
  - "Second Chance" (1979)
  - "Lifeloop" (1979)
  - "Breaking the Game" (1979)
  - "Killing Children" (1979)
  - "And What Will We Do Tomorrow?" (1979)
- Tales from the Forest of Waters
  - "Worthing Farm" (1990) - previously unpublished
  - "Worthing Inn" (1990) - previously unpublished
  - "The Tinker" (1980) - first published in Eternity SF

== See also ==
- Hot Sleep
- Orson Scott Card bibliography
