= Woert (disambiguation) =

Woert, or Wört, is a municipality in Germany.

Woert, van Woert, or variation, may also refer to:

- Van Woert's Regiment of Militia, the 16th Albany County Militia Regiment, of the U.S. Revolutionary War of Independence
- Chris Woerts (born 1959) Dutch businessman
- Nick van Woert, U.S. artist

== See also ==
- Wort (disambiguation)
