= St John's wort (disambiguation) =

St John's wort, Hypericum perforatum, also called "common St John's wort", is a flowering perennial plant that grows up to one meter tall with many yellow flowers, and produces numerous chemical compounds.

Saint John's wort, St. John's Wort, or variants may also refer to:

- Hypericum, the St John's wort genus, which includes Hypericum perforatum
  - List of Hypericum species, includes many common names of the form "[attribute] St John's wort"
- Hypericaceae, the St John's wort family, which includes the St John's wort genus
- St. John's wort inchworm, (Aplocera plagiata), a moth of the family Geometridae
- St. John's wort root borer (Agrilus hyperici), a species of jewel beetle used as an agent of biological pest control against common St. John's wort
- St. John's Wort (film), (Otogirisō), a 2001 Japanese horror film

== See also ==
- Otogirisō, (Japanese for "St John's wort"), a 1992 sound novel video game from which the 2001 film was adapted
- John Wort Hannam, Canadian folk musician
- Saint Joseph's wort, another name for the basil plant
- Saint John's (disambiguation)
- Wort (disambiguation)
