= Worting (disambiguation) =

Worting is a former village and now a district of Basingstoke in Hampshire, England.

Worting may also refer to:

- Worting Junction, Hampshire
- Thomas Worting, MP for Hampshire (UK Parliament constituency)
- Wort extracting, in brewing beer or whisky

== See also ==
- Wort (disambiguation)
- Worthing (disambiguation)
