= Workington (disambiguation) =

Workington is a town on the west coast of Cumberland, England.

Workington may also refer to:

- Workington (Harare), an industrial suburb in Zimbabwe
- Workington (UK Parliament constituency), a House of Commons constituency in Cumberland
- Workington A.F.C., an English football club based in Workington, Cumberland

== See also ==
- Worthington (disambiguation)
