= Cliftonville Curve =

Railway line in England

Coordinates: 50.83395°N 0.15991°W

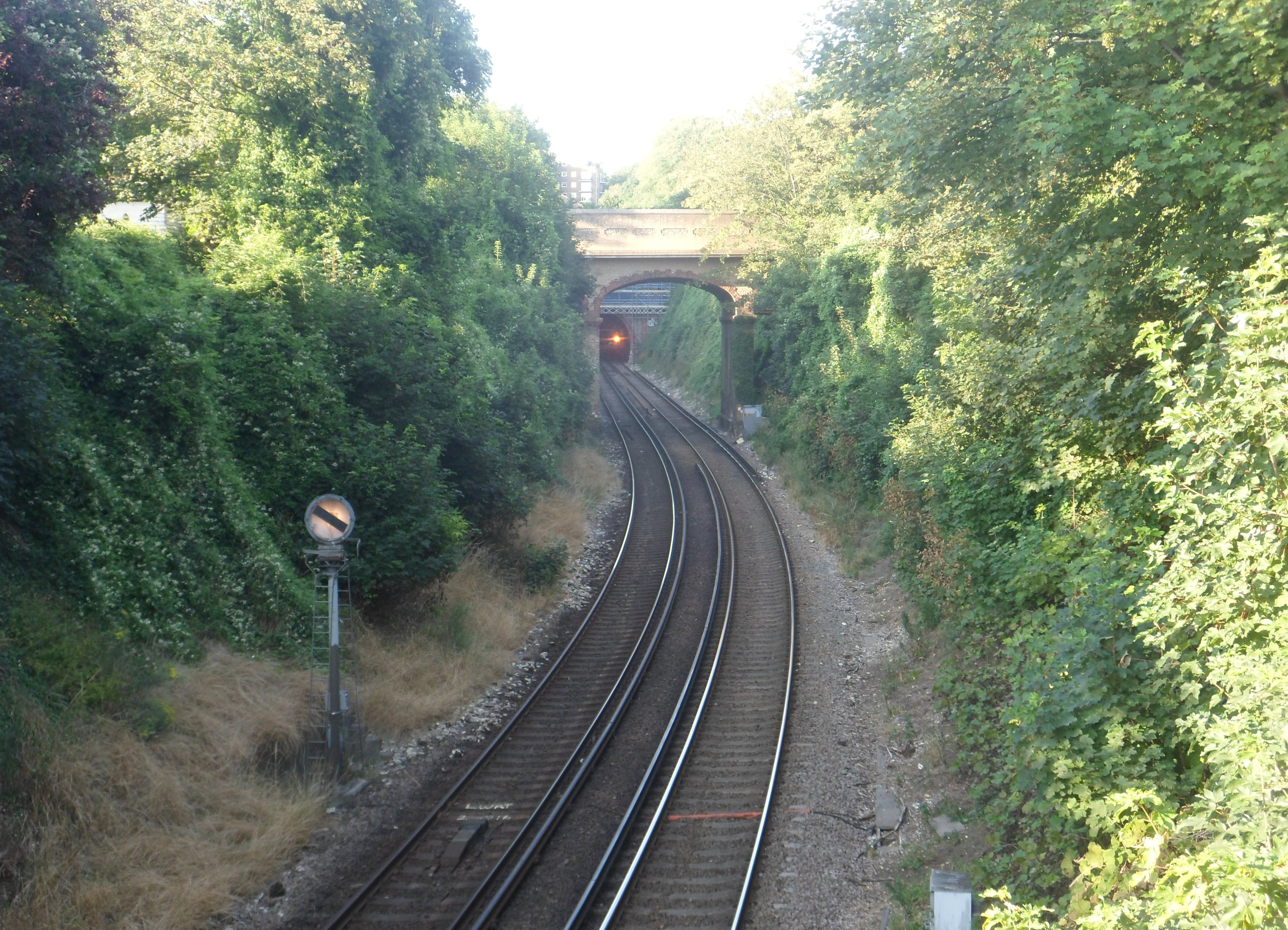
- The Cliftonville Curve looking northeastwards

Overview
- Owner: Network Rail
- Locale: Hove, Preston Village, Brighton, East Sussex
- Termini: Hove; Preston Park
- Connecting lines: West Coastway; Brighton Main
- Stations: 2: Hove, Preston Park

Service
- Operator(s): Southern

History
- Opened: July 1879

Technical
- Number of tracks: 2
- Track gauge: 1,435 mm (4 ft 8 1/2 in) standard gauge

Cliftonville Curve is a short railway that links the West Coastway Line to the Brighton Main Line between Hove and Preston Park. It was opened in July 1879. The curve includes a 535-yard (489 m) tunnel.

The line, which is also known as the Cliftonville Spur, was named in reference to Cliftonville station (now called Hove) which had opened in 1865. Cliftonville was an area of Hove which was developed speculatively as a "fashionable neighbourhood" in the mid-19th century. Construction of the curve allowed trains to travel between the Brighton Main Line and the West Coastway Line without having to reverse at Brighton, reducing congestion there and shortening journeys.

== Bibliography ==
- Hymans, Michael (2016). Sussex Steam. Stroud: Amberley Publishing. ISBN 978-1-445663-06-7.
- Jeffs, Simon (2013). The London to Brighton Line Through Time. Stroud: Amberley Publishing. ISBN 978-1-445609-79-9.
- Middleton, Judy (1979). A History of Hove. Chichester: Phillimore & Co. ISBN 0-85033-325-3.
