= Worthington =

Worthington may refer to:

== People ==
- Worthington (surname)
- Worthington family, a British noble family

== Businesses ==
- Worthington Brewery, also known as Worthington's
- Worthington Corporation, founded as a pump manufacturer in 1845, later a diversified manufacturer, merged into Studebaker-Worthington in 1967
- Worthington Industries, a metals manufacturing company founded in 1955

== Places ==
=== Canada ===
- Worthington, Ontario

=== England ===
- Worthington, Greater Manchester
- Worthington, Leicestershire

=== United States ===
- Worthington, Indiana
- Worthington, Iowa
- Worthington, Kentucky
- Worthington, Louisville, Kentucky, a neighborhood
- Worthington, Massachusetts
- Worthington, Minnesota, in Nobles County
- Worthington Township, Nobles County, Minnesota
- Worthington, Missouri
- Worthington, Ohio, in Franklin County
- Worthington Township, Richland County, Ohio
- Worthington, Pennsylvania
- Worthington, West Virginia

== Other ==
- Worthington, a clothing line from J. C. Penney
- Worthington College, a fictional school in the television show Dawson's Creek
- Worthington Peak, a mountain in Nevada

== See also ==
- Worthing (disambiguation)
- Workington (disambiguation)
