= Hot Sleep =

1979 novel by Orson Scott Card

- First edition
- Author: Orson Scott Card
- Cover artist: Gray Morrow
- Language: English
- Series: The Worthing series
- Genre: Science fiction
- Publisher: Baronet Publishing
- Publication date: 1979
- Publication place: United States
- Media type: Print (hard & paperback)
- Pages: 309
- ISBN: 0-89437-054-5
- OCLC: 18134695
- Dewey Decimal: 813/.54 19
- LC Class: PS3553.A655 T7 1988

Hot Sleep: The Worthing Chronicle (1979) is a science fiction novel by American writer Orson Scott Card, part of his Worthing series. Card's novel The Worthing Chronicle (1983) covers some of the same ground.

Hot Sleep was Card's first novel-length published science fiction, followed by A Planet Called Treason. The short story collection Capitol was published earlier the same year.

== Plot summary ==
The book follows Jason Worthing, also known as Jazz, who is a boy growing up on Capitol, the capital planet of the Empire. Jas has "the swipe", which is a genetic trait that allows for telepathy. The swipe is feared in the Empire, so those who possess it are executed. After being found out as a swipe, Jas tries to escape, which leads to his capture by Abner Doon, who helps him rise to prominence as a space pilot. Eventually, Abner sends Jason away as the head of a colony so that the swipe would become more widespread, but when his ship reaches the planet he is attacked, and the memories of all but one of the 333 colonists are destroyed and two-thirds of the colonist are killed or damaged beyond awakening. Jason prevails, however, leading to the survival of the colony. Jason guides the development of the new culture over multiple generations by using a substance called Somec, which allows humans to sleep long periods of time without aging. Eventually, Abner Doon comes and sees how Jason has done, and after Doon leaves, Jason takes his ship to the bottom of the ocean.

== Title ==
The title arises from the operation of somec, the life extension drug forming the foundation of the interstellar Empire. Somec creates an unbearable, torturous burning sensation throughout the body while pushing the patient to suspended animation. However, the somec process exterminates the user's memory, and so these memories are recorded and stored separately shortly before they go under, to be returned to the body after they have awakened, and so the memory of the process itself cannot be retained. Thus, each somec patient experiences the panic of burning hot sleep "for the first time" (as far as their memory goes) no matter how many times they have taken somec before.

== Other publication ==
Hot Sleep was re-released as a serialized novel in the first issue of Card's Intergalactic Medicine Show in October 2005.

== See also ==
- Orson Scott Card bibliography
