= Hove railway station =

Railway station in East Sussex, England

Coordinates: 50°50′07″N 0°10′15″W

Hove
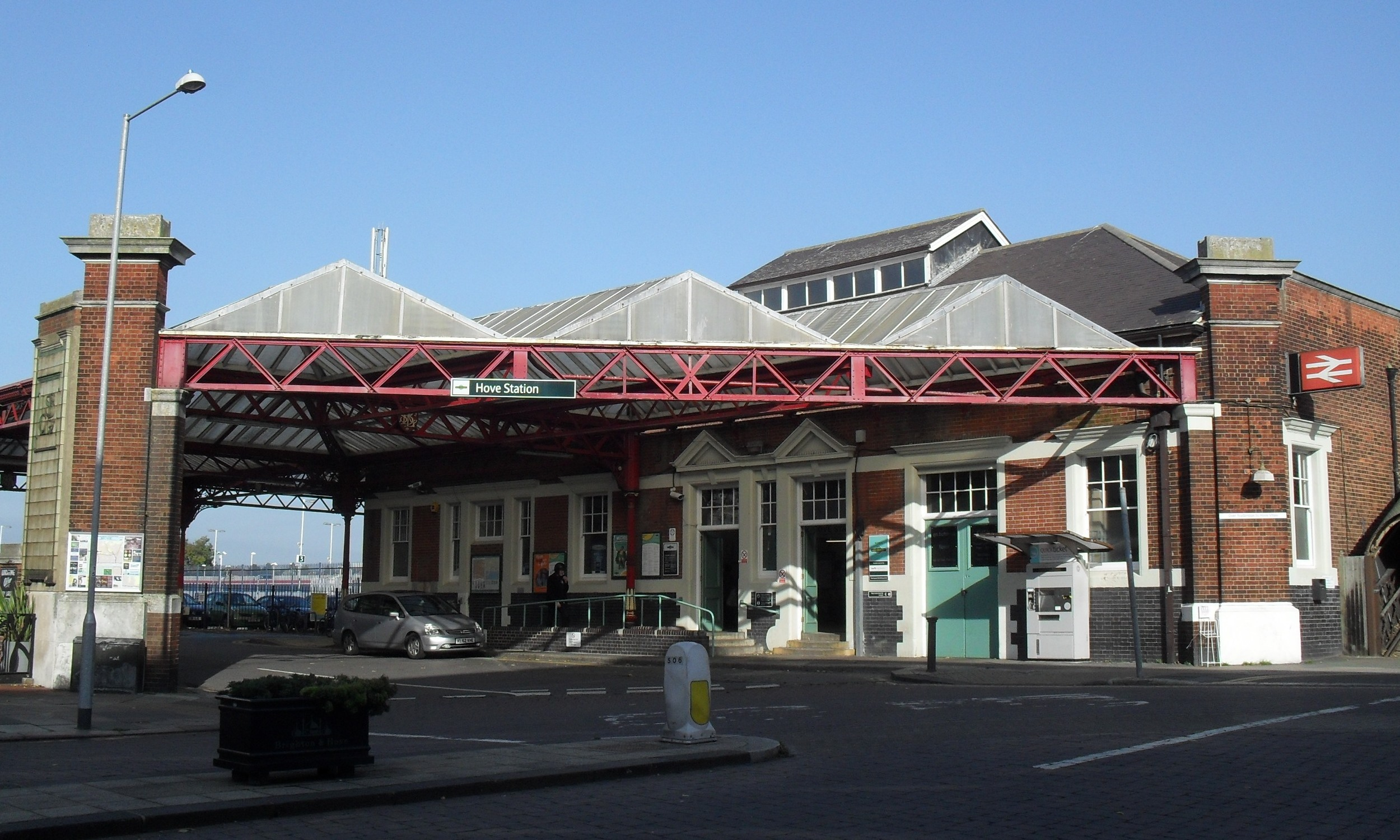
- The main façade in 2010, looking northwest

General information
- Location: Hove; England
- Grid reference: TQ289055
- Manager: Southern
- Platforms: 3

Other information
- Station code: HOV
- Classification: DfT category C2

Key dates
- 1 October 1865: Opened (Cliftonville)
- 1 July 1879: Renamed (West Brighton)
- 1 October 1894: Renamed (Hove and West Brighton)
- 1 July 1895: Renamed (Hove)

Passengers
- 2020/21: ▼0.631 million
- Interchange: ▼92,369
- 2021/22: ▲1.457 million
- Interchange: ▲0.227 million
- 2022/23: ▲1.767 million
- Interchange: ▲0.328 million
- 2023/24: ▲1.805 million
- Interchange: ▲0.409 million
- 2024/25: ▲2.029 million
- Interchange: ▼0.208 million
Location
Notes
- Passenger statistics from the Office of Rail and Road

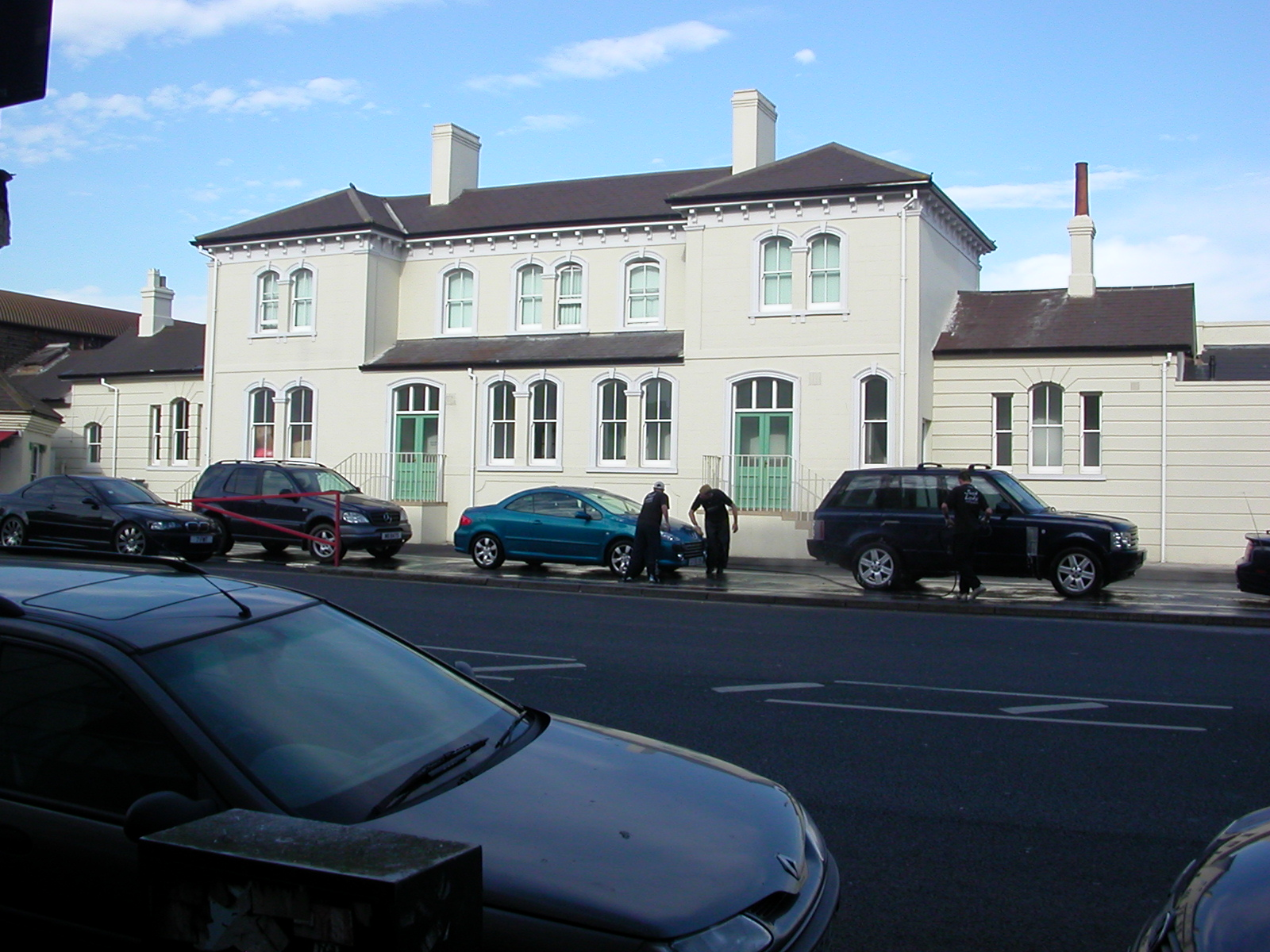
The original station building at Hove, now used as a hand car wash.

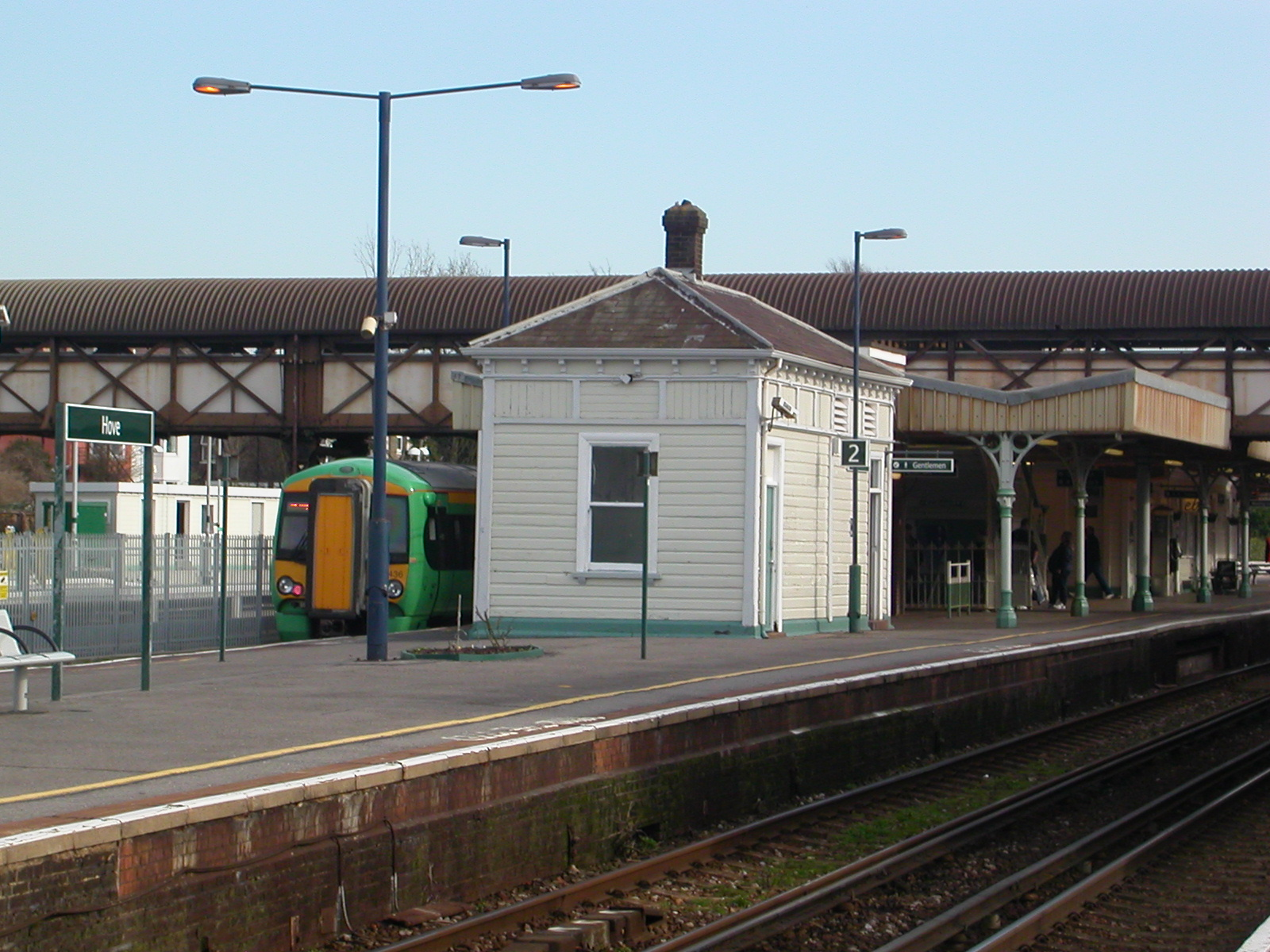
The island platform looking east, with the long footbridge behind. Southern EMU 377436 stands at Platform 1 with a London Victoria service.

Hove railway station serves Hove, in Brighton and Hove in the county of East Sussex, England. It is 50 miles 56 chains (81.6 km) measured from London Victoria. The station and the majority of trains serving it are operated by Southern.

Gatwick Express trains stable at Hove from time to time.

It is the closest railway station to the County Cricket Ground, Hove where Sussex CCC play matches.

== History ==
The original Hove railway station, situated further to the east, opened on 11 May 1840 by the London & Brighton Railway, on its line from Brighton to Shoreham-by-Sea, designed by the architect David Mocatta. It closed on 1 March 1880, and the site became part of Holland Road Goods Depot.' A wooden halt named Holland Road Halt was also opened a short distance to the west in 1905, served by local trains towards Worthing and on the branch line to Devil's Dyke. This closed in 1956, and no trace now remains of its platforms.

The present Hove station was opened on 1 October 1865. It was originally named Cliftonville, then West Brighton, before being renamed Hove and West Brighton in 1894 and finally Hove in 1895.

== Station architecture ==
The original station building, dating from the station's opening in 1865, is on the south side of the line and to the east of the present ticket office and concourse, being separated from this by a long footbridge (a public right of way) linking the residential roads of Goldstone Villas and Hove Park Villas. The section of road on which the original building stands is called Station Approach. It is currently in commercial use. The design is very similar to that of the buildings still in use at West Worthing, Shoreham-by-Sea, Portslade and London Road stations, and the former Kemp Town station in Brighton.

In 1893, coinciding with the first renaming, a new building was provided to the west. This contains the current ticket office and other station facilities. A large steel and glass porte-cochere stands outside at an angle, sheltering the taxi rank, forecourt and entrance area. This was moved from London Victoria following rebuilding works there which had rendered it redundant.

The island platform is reached by subway; access from the footbridge between the old and new buildings is no longer possible, as the stairs from it are locked out of use. This platform has a modest building incorporating a café, staff accommodation and waiting room, with a separate toilet block. A wide canopy runs for most of the length of the platform.

== Future developments ==
In 2007, a Department for Transport white paper on the Thameslink Programme contained proposals to extend the Thameslink network to various additional routes in southern England; one of these would have been the section of the West Coastway line between Hove and Littlehampton, with services running via the Cliftonville Curve from the Brighton Main Line. Two trains per peak hour have been extended from London Bridge to Bedford from 20 May 2018 and an extra service will join in December 2018. These services were removed in 2023.

== Layout ==
Both the West Coastway line (through the station from Brighton) and the Cliftonville Curve (a few hundred metres east of the station, connecting services to/from the west with the Brighton to London mainline) are double track.

There are three running lines through the station, on which – numbered from north to south - island platform faces 1 and 2 can be (and are) used for any combination of arrival or departure, whilst southernmost platform 3 (where the main entrance, ticketing facilities and newspaper shop are found - see photo of building taken from Goldstone Villas, to the south) cannot be used for eastbound arrivals from the West Coastway or departures towards London in the up direction.

== Services ==
All services at Hove are operated by Southern using Class 377 EMUs.

The typical off-peak service in trains per hour is:

- 2 tph to London Victoria via Gatwick Airport
- 4 tph to Brighton
- 2 tph to Littlehampton
- 1 tph to Portsmouth & Southsea
- 1 tph to Chichester via Littlehampton
- 2 tph to Southampton Central

During the peak hours, the station is served by a small number of direct trains between Brighton and Littlehampton, as well as a single peak hour service per day between London Bridge and Littlehampton.

Until May 2022, Great Western Railway operated limited services between Brighton, Portsmouth Harbour and Bristol Temple Meads that called at Hove. Thameslink also operated peak services between Littlehampton and Bedford until January 2023. These services were cut back to London Bridge in January 2023, before the service transferred to Southern in May 2023

Preceding station	National Rail	Following station
Brighton	Southern West Coastway Line	Aldrington or Portslade
Preston Park	Southern Brighton Main Line	Portslade

== See also ==
- Grade II listed buildings in Brighton and Hove: E–H
