= Wart (disambiguation) =

A wart is a small, rough growth resembling a cauliflower or a solid blister.

Wart may also refer to:

== Arts, entertainment, and media ==
- Wart (character), a fictional frog in Nintendo games
- Wart, the principal character in T. H. White's 1938 novel The Sword in the Stone
- Molester's Train: The Wart, a 1996 Japanese pink film
- WART-LP, a low-power radio station (95.5 FM) licensed to serve Marshall, North Carolina, United States

== Other uses ==
- Azariah Wart (1822–1900), New York assemblyman
- Wart Castle, a Swiss heritage site

== See also ==
- Freek van der Wart (born 1988), Dutch short track speed skater
- Van Wart, a list of people with the surname
