= Worthing High School =

Worthing High School may refer to:

- Worthing High School, West Sussex - UK
- Worthing High School (Houston, Texas)
