= The Worthing series =

Series of novels by Orson Scott Card

Cover of The Worthing Saga.

The Worthing series is a series of science fiction works by American writer Orson Scott Card. It consists of two anthologies and two novels. The first three books in this series are currently out of print.

== Books in the series ==
- Capitol (1979)
- Hot Sleep (1979)
- The Worthing Chronicle (1983) - revised edition of Hot Sleep
- The Worthing Saga (1990; includes The Worthing Chronicle and selected stories from Capitol)

== See also ==
- List of works by Orson Scott Card
