= The Worthing Chronicle =

1983 science fiction novel by Orson Scott Card

- First edition
- Author: Orson Scott Card
- Cover artist: Don Maitz
- Language: English
- Series: The Worthing series
- Genre: Science fiction
- Publisher: Ace Books
- Publication date: 1983
- Publication place: United States
- Media type: Print (hardback & paperback)
- Pages: 272
- ISBN: 0-441-91810-7
- OCLC: 9980726

The Worthing Chronicle (1983) is a science fiction novel by American writer Orson Scott Card, part of The Worthing series. This book by itself is out of print having been published along with nine short stories in the collection The Worthing Saga (1990).

== Plot summary ==
Jason Worthing and one of his descendants, Justice, go to a small village on a backward world to get a boy named Lared to write a book for them. This book is about why Abner Doon destroyed the empire and the planet Capitol and why Jason's descendants destroyed the planet Worthing. It also explains why people all over the settled part of the galaxy are no longer being protected by "God" from pain and hardship.

The Worthing Chronicle is an expansion of Card's first novel, Hot Sleep.

== See also ==
- Orson Scott Card bibliography
