= Capitol (short story collection) =

1979 book by Orson Scott Card

- First edition
- Author: Orson Scott Card
- Cover artist: Vicente Segrelles
- Language: English
- Series: The Worthing series
- Genre: Science fiction
- Publisher: Ace Books
- Publication date: 1979
- Publication place: United States
- Media type: Print (Paperback)
- Pages: 278 pp
- ISBN: 0-441-09136-9
- OCLC: 11730353

Capitol (1979) was Orson Scott Card's second published book, and first foray into science fiction. This collection of eleven short stories set in the Worthing series is no longer in print. However six of the stories have been reprinted in The Worthing Saga (1990) and one of them in Maps in a Mirror (1990).

== Contents ==
The short stories in this book are:

- "A Sleep and a Forgetting"
- "A Thousand Deaths" - Reprinted in Maps in a Mirror
- "Skipping Stones" - Reprinted in The Worthing Saga
- "Second Chance" - Reprinted in The Worthing Saga
- "Breaking the Game" - Reprinted in The Worthing Saga
- "Lifeloop" - Reprinted in The Worthing Saga
- "Burning"
- "And What Will We Do Tomorrow?" - Reprinted in The Worthing Saga
- "Killing Children" - Reprinted in The Worthing Saga
- "When No One Remembers His Name, Does God Retire?"
- "The Stars That Blink"

== See also ==
- Orson Scott Card bibliography
