= West Worthing railway station =

Railway station in West Sussex, England

Coordinates: 50°49′06″N 0°23′34″W

West Worthing
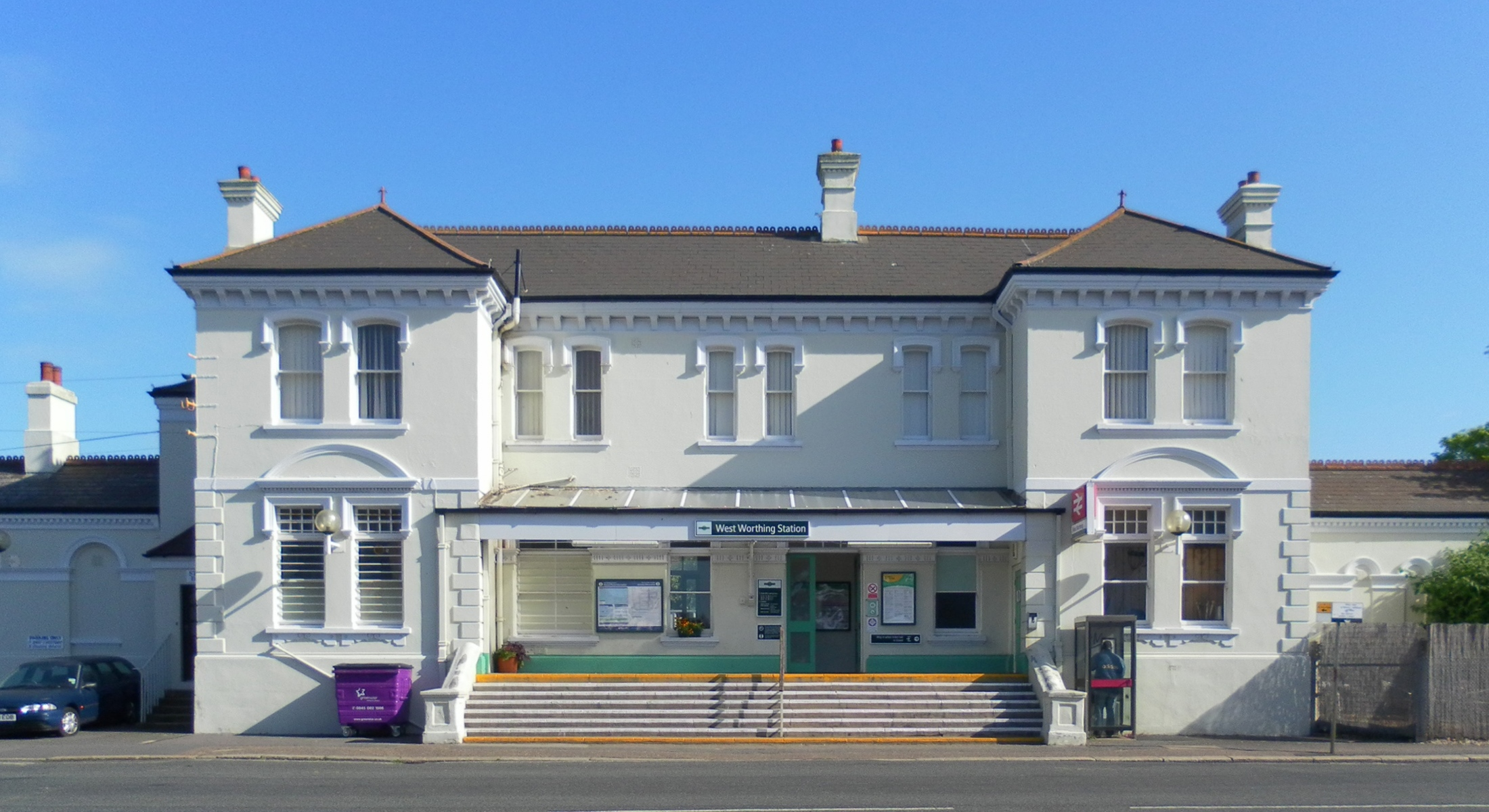
- Main station building at West Worthing

General information
- Location: Worthing, Worthing, West Sussex; England
- Grid reference: TQ132033
- Managed by: Southern
- Platforms: 2

Other information
- Station code: WWO
- Classification: DfT category D

History
- Opened: 4 November 1889

Passengers
- 2020/21: ▼0.174 million
- 2021/22: ▲0.456 million
- 2022/23: ▲0.538 million
- 2023/24: ▼0.523 million
- 2024/25: ▲0.672 million
Location
Notes
- Passenger statistics from the Office of Rail and Road

West Worthing railway station is one of five stations serving the town of Worthing in the county of West Sussex, England. (The other stations being Worthing, East Worthing, Durrington-on-Sea and Goring-by-Sea). It is 11 miles 30 chains (18.3 km) down the line from Brighton. The station is operated by Southern.

== History ==
Historically, the station was planned to be the southern terminus of a new line running from the Midlands to the South Coast, and delivering holidaymakers to the new town of West Worthing; it was consequently built near the northern end of Grand Avenue, which runs from the station to the sea. The line was never constructed.

The station was built by J.T. Firbank and opened on 4 November 1889. It was expanded by the addition of a large goods yard in 1905 which catered for the produce of the large number of market gardens in the area, but by 1932 part of the yard was given over to the carriage sheds which, until mid-2008, stood to the west of the station.

In January 2008 demolition of the former depot building began. The building was removed because of asbestos and poor condition of the structure.

== Incidents ==
On 19 November 2020, a Southern Class 313 EMU numbered 313220 caught fire on platform 2 of the station. No one was injured.

On 1 February 2022, the driver of an out-of-service Class 313 EMU waiting in the siding to the west of the station was struck and killed by a Southern Class 377 EMU approaching the station. Investigations by the Rail Accident Investigation Branch concluded that the driver had likely left the safety of his cab to urinate, as Class 313 trains do not have on-board toilets. The RAIB recommended that Govia Thameslink Railway should review staff toilet facilities on its routes, and ensure that staff are aware of these facilities and have sufficient time to use them.

== Services ==
All services at West Worthing are operated by Southern using Class 377 EMUs.

The typical off-peak service in trains per hour is:

- 2 tph to London Victoria via Gatwick Airport
- 2 tph to Brighton
- 2 tph to Littlehampton
- 1 tph to Portsmouth & Southsea
- 1 tph to Chichester via Littlehampton

During the peak hours, the station is served by a single peak hour service per day between London Bridge and Littlehampton. A number of additional peak hours services to Brighton also start from this station.

On Sundays, the service between Littlehampton and London Victoria is reduced to hourly, but the station is served by an additional hourly service between Brighton and Portsmouth Harbour.

Preceding station	National Rail	Following station
Worthing	Southern West Coastway Line	Durrington-on-Sea
