= Worthing railway station =

Railway station in West Sussex, England

Coordinates: 50°49′07″N 0°22′33″W

Worthing
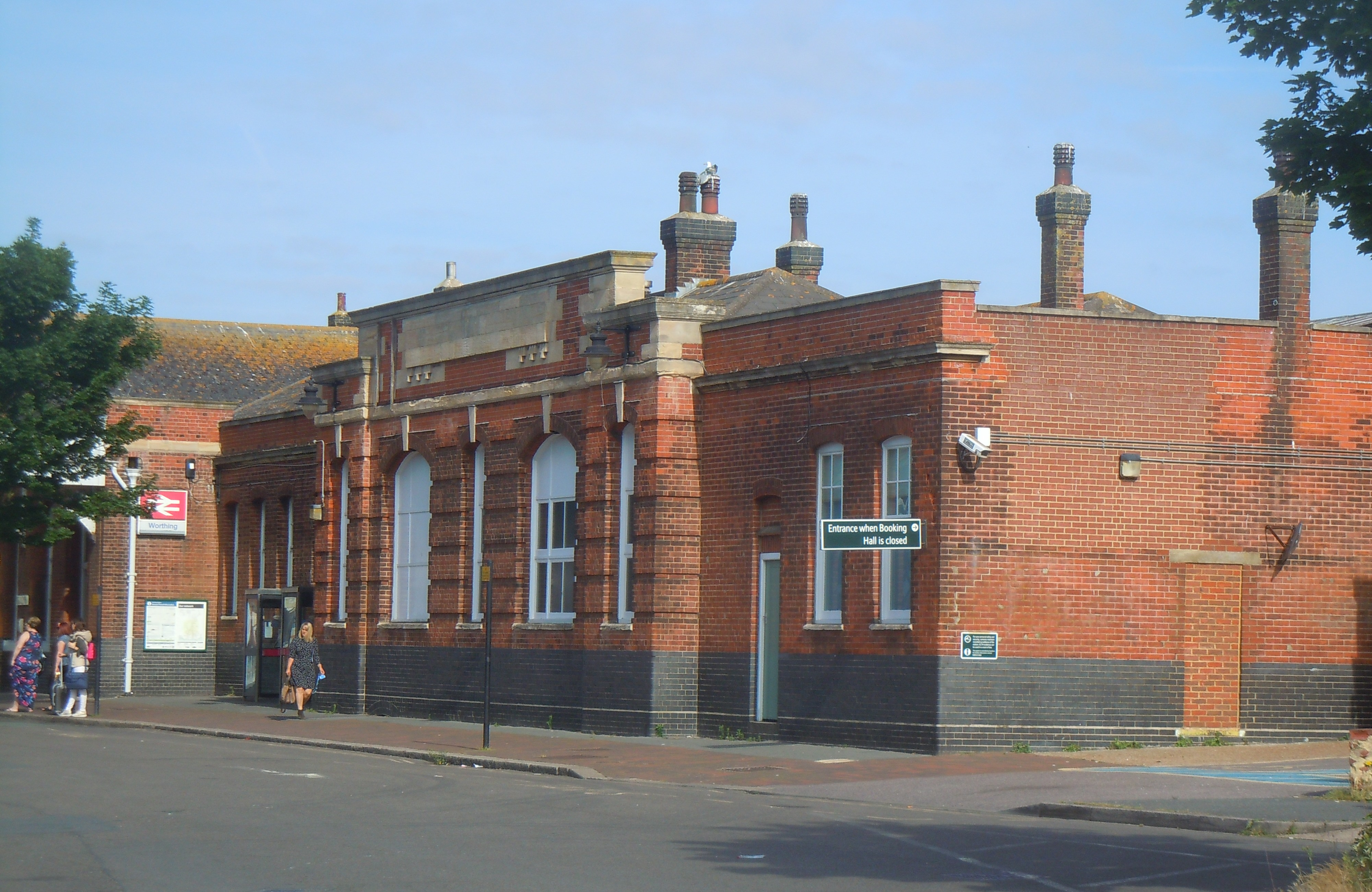

General information
- Location: Worthing, West Sussex; England
- Grid reference: TQ145033
- Managed by: Southern
- Platforms: 3

Other information
- Station code: WRH
- Classification: DfT category C

History
- Opened: 24 November 1845

Passengers
- 2020/21: ▼0.698 million
- 2021/22: ▲1.639 million
- Interchange: 66,718
- 2022/23: ▲1.891 million
- Interchange: ▼18,160
- 2023/24: ▲1.924 million
- Interchange: ▲33,158
- 2024/25: ▲2.177 million
- Interchange: ▲0.100 million
Location
Notes
- Passenger statistics from the Office of Rail & Road

Worthing railway station is the largest of the five stations serving the town of Worthing in West Sussex, the other stations being East Worthing, West Worthing, Durrington-on-Sea and Goring-by-Sea. It is 10 miles 46 chains (17.0 km) down the line from Brighton. The station is managed by Southern, who operate all the services. It is one of the main stations on the West Coastway Line; all timetabled trains stop here.

At times in its history, the station has been named Worthing Central. This name is sometimes incorrectly still used, either out of habit or intentionally to distinguish it from West Worthing and East Worthing.

Worthing is the only station in DfT category C that has not been given a subcategory; it is listed by the Department for Transport as simply "C", while all other stations in this group have been divided into C1 and C2.

== History ==
The station opened on 24 November 1845 by the Brighton and Chichester Railway when that railway opened between Shoreham and Worthing. The first service arrived early in the morning from Shoreham but the official opening was scheduled for mid-day. Crowds thronged on Teville Bridge adjoining the station to witness a train from Shoreham drawn by a locomotive called "Ercombert", probably named after Eorcenberht of Kent (died 664), a king of Kent. As the train passed under the bridge, a local band of musicians played the National Anthem.

The original station buildings opened in 1845 and are now Grade II listed. They were converted into 2 cottages sometime after 1859 when a new station building was built further west. This "new" station was rebuilt and expanded in 1911.

In August 2007, ticket barriers were introduced separating the platforms from the ticket office. However, their effectiveness is compromised by the layout of the station insofar as the rear car park entrance leads directly to the subway connecting the platforms. A small ticket booth, frequently unstaffed, has been installed in the subway in an attempt to address this issue. In April 2009, the station was made fully accessible to disabled passengers, with new ticket windows that can be adjusted to height, a ramp was also provided, the station was also fitted with new folding doors.

== Facilities ==
The main station entrance is on the south side in Station Approach. The passenger car park is on the north side of the station in Southcourt Road and has a separate entrance to the station. The concourse and ticket office leads directly to the side platform (platform 3), which is used mostly for westbound services. The island platform (platforms 1 and 2) is connected to this platform by a subway, which also leads out to the car park.

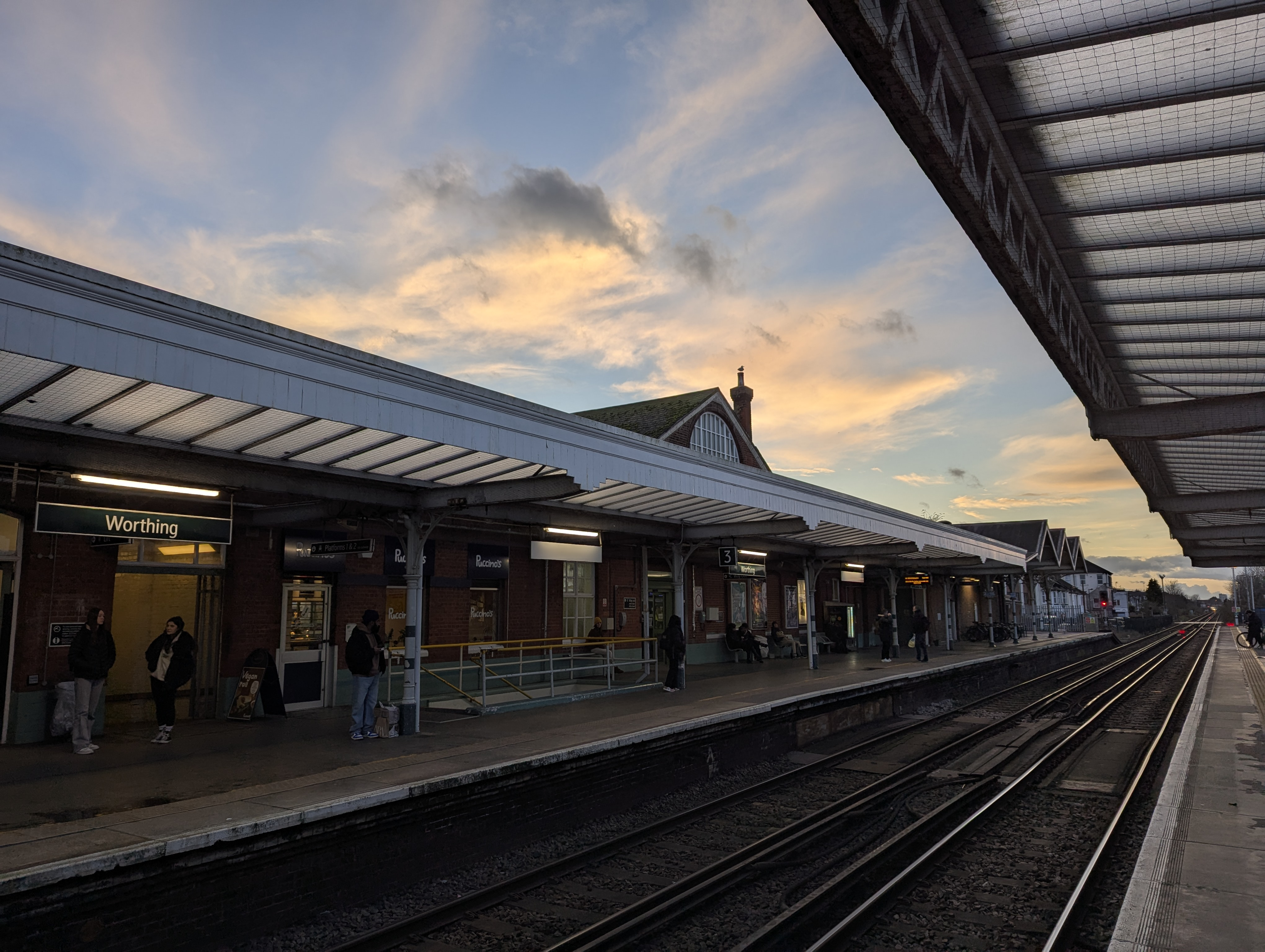
Worthing station ticket hall exterior taken from platform 2

== Platform layout ==
The station has three platforms, all of which are long enough to accommodate 12-carriage trains.

- Platform 1: typically only used at peak times, often for terminating services
- Platform 2: used for eastbound services to Brighton, London Victoria and London Bridge
- Platform 3: used for westbound services to Littlehampton, Portsmouth Harbour & Southampton Central

== Services ==
All services at Worthing are operated by Southern using Class 377 EMUs.

The typical off-peak service in trains per hour is:

- 2 tph to London Victoria via Gatwick Airport
- 4 tph to Brighton
- 2 tph to Littlehampton
- 1 tph to Portsmouth & Southsea
- 1 tph to Chichester via Littlehampton
- 2 tph to Southampton Central

During the peak hours, the station is served by a small number of direct trains between Brighton and Littlehampton, as well as a single peak hour service per day between London Bridge and Littlehampton.

Until May 2022 Great Western Railway operated limited services between Brighton, Portsmouth Harbour and Bristol Temple Meads that called at Worthing.

Preceding station	National Rail	Following station
East Worthing or Lancing	Southern West Coastway Line	West Worthing or Angmering
