= Bungalow Town Halt railway station =

Disused railway station in England

Coordinates: 50.8318°N 0.2948°W

Bungalow Town Halt was a small railway station in what is now Shoreham Beach, West Sussex. Bungalow Town had started in the 1870s as a series of converted railway carriages on the shingle spit shielding the River Adur. The station was opened in 1910 and closed at the start of 1933. The station reopened as Shoreham Airport on 1 July 1935, serving Shoreham Airport to the north of the railway line until it was closed on 15 July 1940.

== Services ==
Preceding station	Disused railways	Following station
Shoreham-by-Sea	London, Brighton and South Coast Railway	Lancing
