= Portsmouth & Southsea railway station =

Railway station in Portsmouth, England

Coordinates: 50.798448°N 1.090393°W

Portsmouth & Southsea
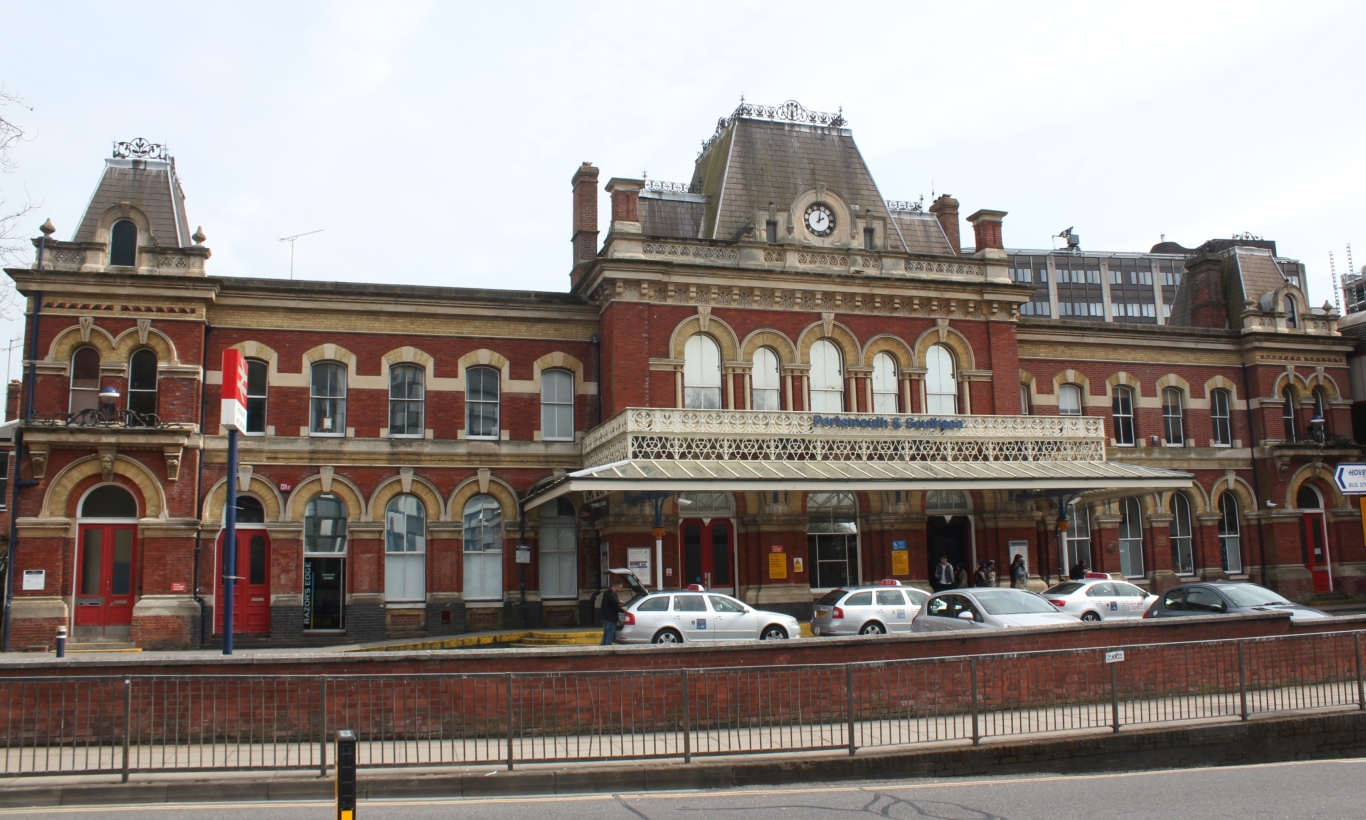
- Portsmouth & Southsea station entrance (2018)

General information
- Location: Landport, Portsmouth, Hampshire, England
- Grid reference: SU641002
- Managed by: South Western Railway
- Platforms: 4

Other information
- Station code: PMS
- Classification: DfT category C1

History
- Original company: Portsmouth and Ryde Joint Railway
- Pre-grouping: London, Brighton and South Coast Railway
- Post-grouping: Southern Railway

Key dates
- 14 June 1847: Opened as Portsmouth
- 1866: Reopened after rebuild
- 2 October 1876: Renamed Portsmouth Town
- 1925: Renamed Portsmouth & Southsea

Passengers
- 2020/21: ▼0.528 million
- Interchange: ▼6,479
- 2021/22: ▲1.422 million
- Interchange: ▲16,031
- 2022/23: ▲1.707 million
- Interchange: ▲21,158
- 2023/24: ▲1.736 million
- Interchange: ▲24,344
- 2024/25: ▼1.586 million
- Interchange: ▲26,477
Location
Notes
- Passenger statistics from the Office of Rail and Road

Portsmouth & Southsea railway station is a Grade II listed building and the main railway station in the city of Portsmouth in Hampshire, England. It is in the Landport area close to the Commercial Road shopping area. British Transport Police maintain a presence at the station. There is a taxi rank at the front of the building and regular local buses within five minutes' walking distance.

The station, which is managed by South Western Railway, has ticket barriers in operation.

== History ==
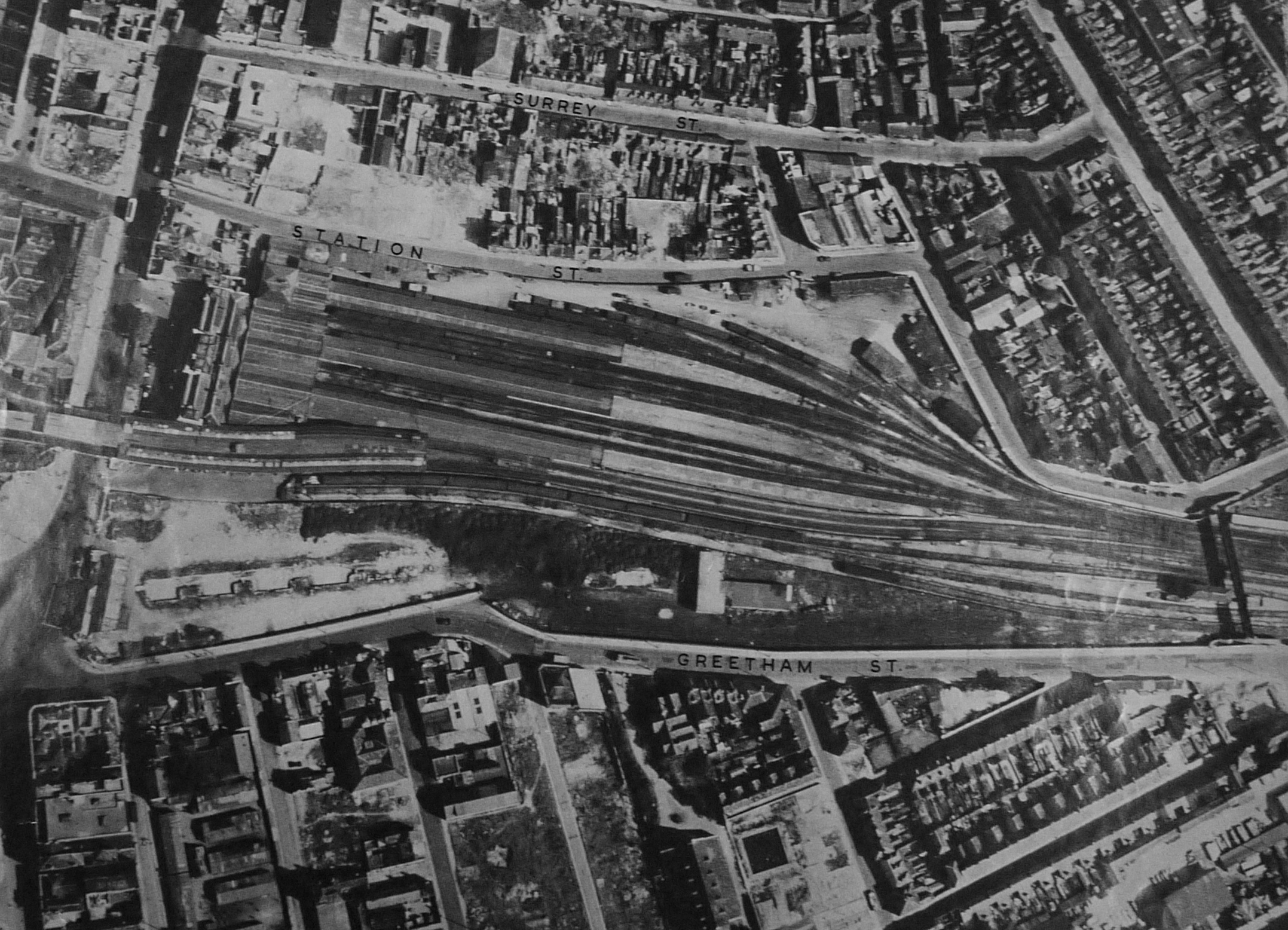
Aerial view of the station in 1946, showing seven platforms (now four) and to the south, the former location of the adjoining goods station which was closed in 1936 and relocated to Fratton.

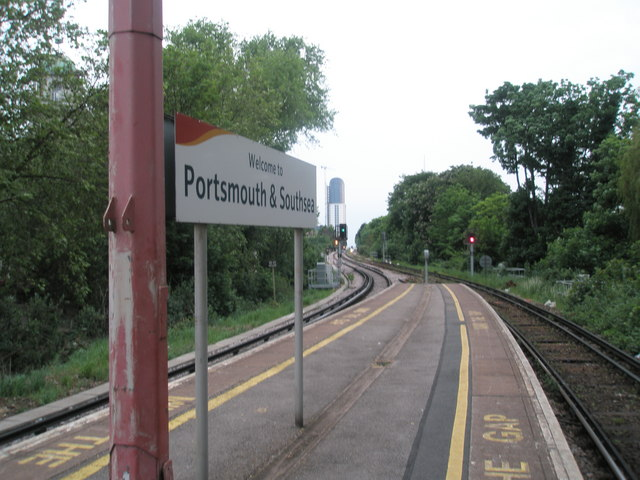
View of the west end of high level platforms 2 (left) and 1 (right), located on an embankment

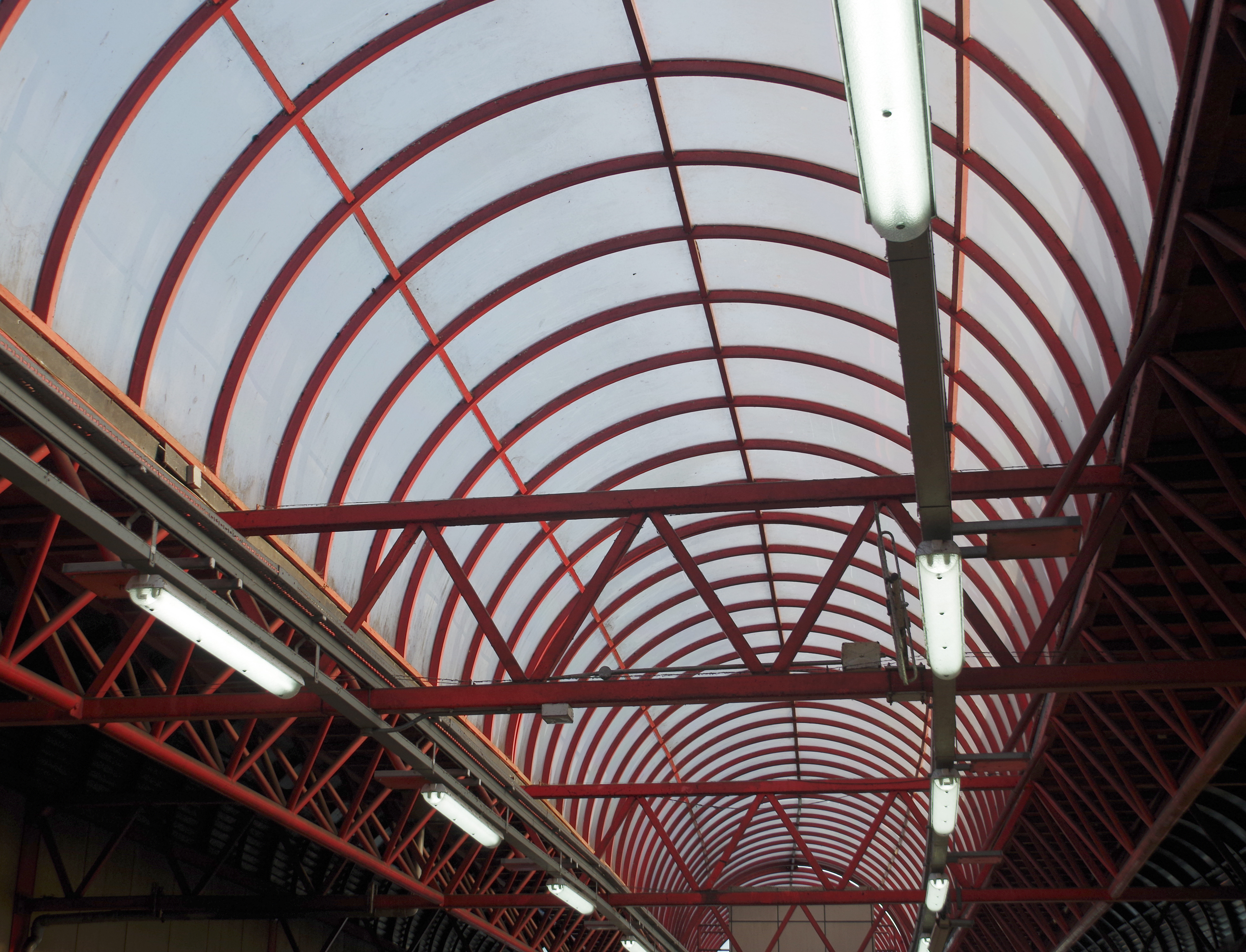
View of the 1980s British Rail era canopy over upper level platforms 1 & 2

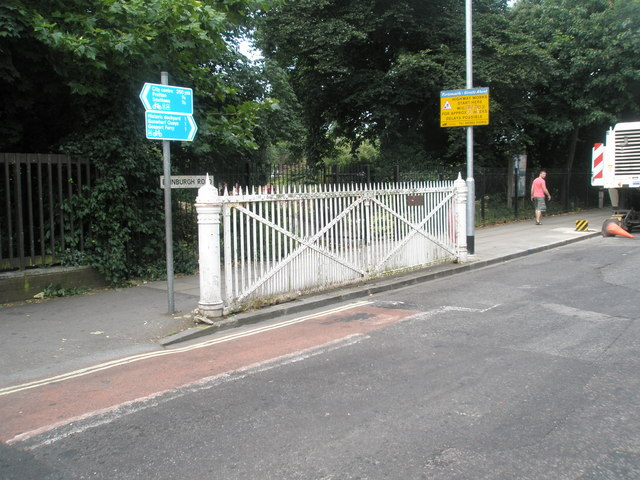
View of the surviving Admiralty Line level crossing gates on Edinburgh Road close to Victoria Park.

An earlier and smaller station building was opened as Portsmouth on 14 June 1847 and served as a terminus station. The present station was built in 1866 and was further extended via additional high level platforms to Portsmouth Harbour in 1876. It was later renamed Portsmouth Town on 2 October 1876 to avoid confusion with other stations in Portsmouth, such as Portsmouth Harbour.

To the south of the passenger railway station and high level platforms, an adjoining railway goods station stood until 1936, when it was relocated to Fratton Goods Yard. Currently, a Premier Inn hotel and University of Portsmouth student accommodation blocks now occupy the site of the former Portsmouth Town goods station.

The station's present-day name of Portsmouth & Southsea originates from 1925 after the closure of the Southsea Railway branch line, which had a terminus station in Southsea named East Southsea from 1885–1914. Competing trams and trolleybuses put the Southsea Railway out of business and was closed in 1914. Train passengers and tourists bound for Southsea were then diverted to Portsmouth's main railway station, Portsmouth Town which was later renamed Portsmouth & Southsea in 1925. A year later, the town of Southsea became officially integrated into the city of Portsmouth on 21 April 1926 when Portsmouth was granted city status.

Portsmouth & Southsea station was once the junction for the Portsmouth Dockyard branch, known as the Admiralty Line. The line opened in 1857 and branched off from the west end of today's platform 1 and passed through the east side of Victoria Park, close to the rear of Stanhope Road, before crossing Bishop Crispian Way via a level crossing (the gates still exist) and entering the naval base at the Unicorn Gate. The Admiralty Line was closed in 1977.

During the 1980s, Portsmouth & Southsea station lost three of its five low level platforms and adjoining sidings to redevelopment, a large Matalan retail store (originally a W.H.Smith Do It All DIY retailer) and car park were built on their location to the south of Station Street.

Part of the station, specifically the 1980s canopy over high level platforms 1 and 2, is still in its original red Network SouthEast livery. In early 2021 strengthening work was carried on Landport Viaduct which carries the high level platforms 1 & 2.

Presently, the station is still informally and colloquially known as Town Station by Portsmouth's local population, despite Portsmouth having been awarded city status on 21 April 1926.

== Services ==
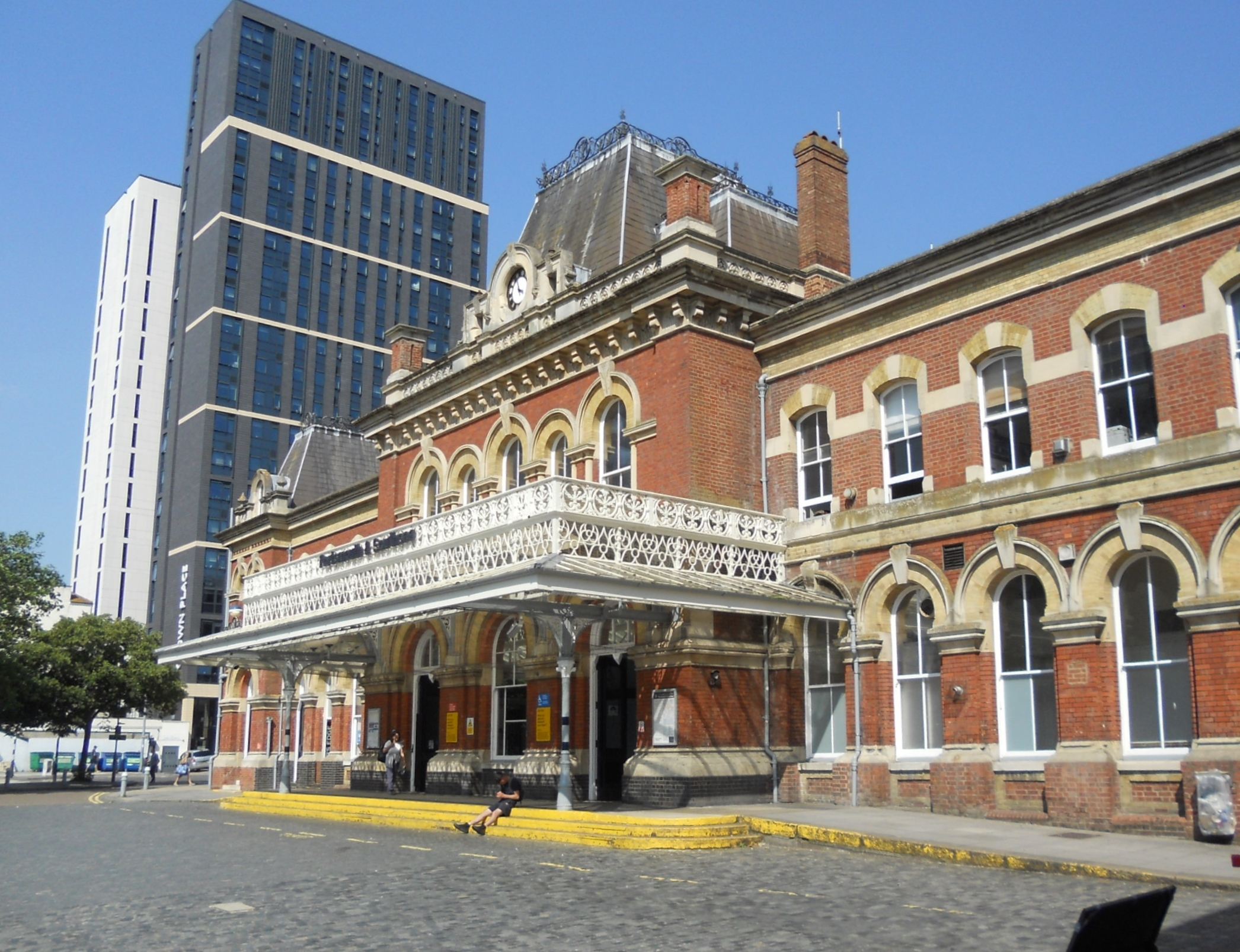
Station entrance

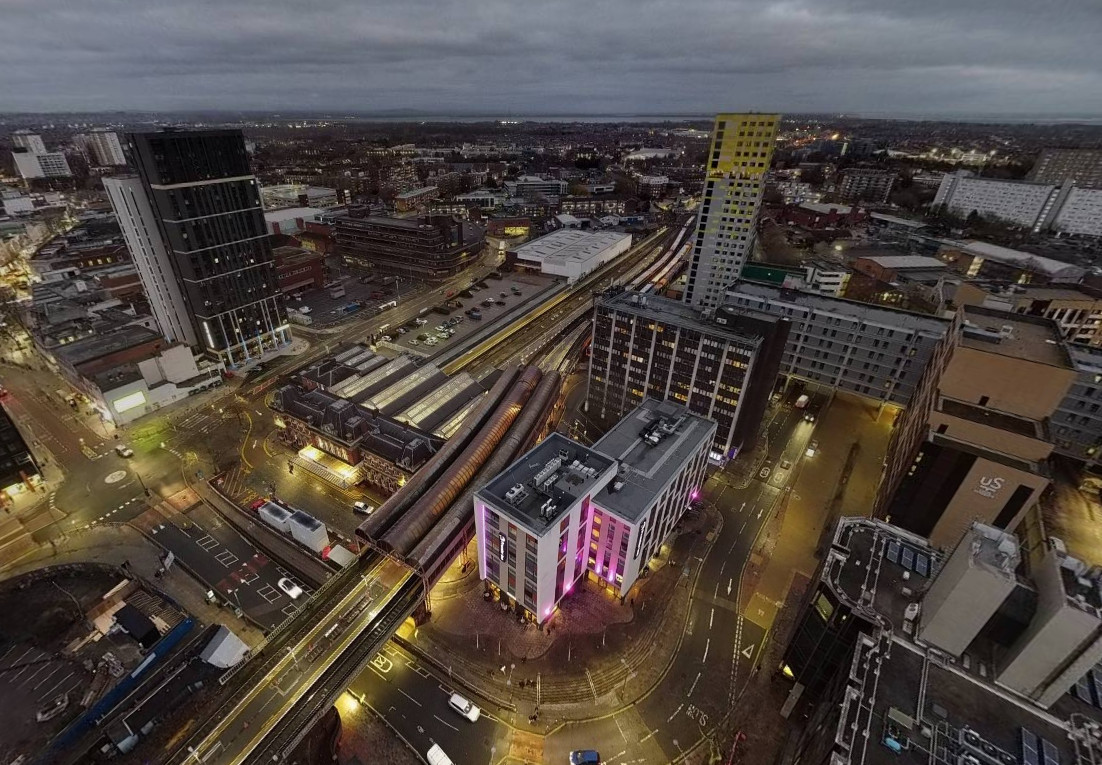
Overhead view of the station at dusk

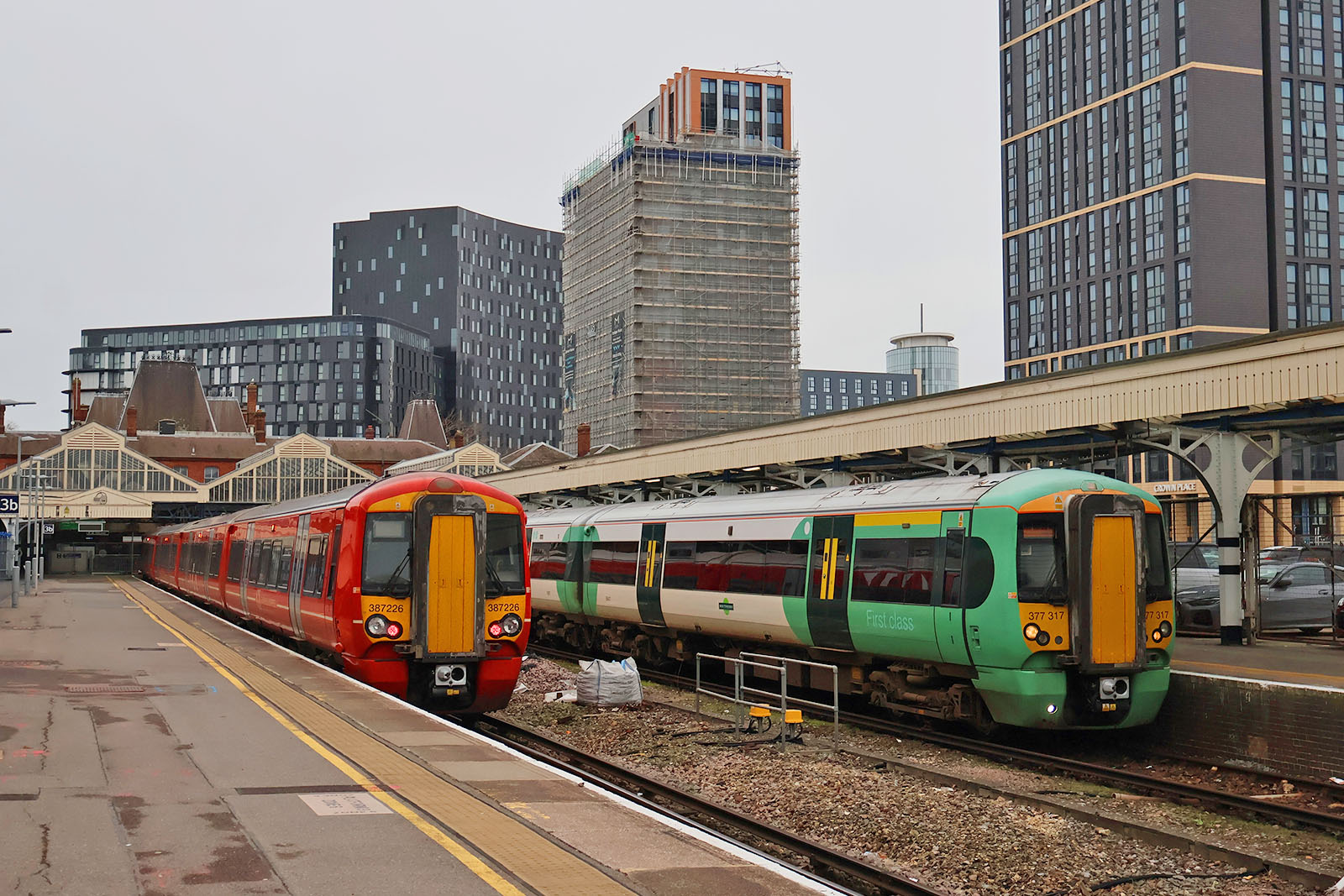
Southern trains at low level platforms 3 & 4

The station is located on the Portsmouth Direct line which runs between London Waterloo and Portsmouth Harbour. In addition there are regular services to Cardiff Central, Bristol Temple Meads, Southampton Central, Eastleigh, Guildford, Woking, Brighton, Gatwick Airport, East Croydon and London Victoria. The station is split into two distinct parts: the high level island (Platforms 1 and 2) for through trains to the harbour, and the low level (bay Platforms 3 and 4) where some trains terminate. In addition, Hovertravel run a bus service from Portsmouth & Southsea which connects to their Hovercraft service from Southsea to the Isle of Wight. The Ryde Hovertravel terminal is located next to Ryde Esplanade, with a single price ticket for journeys via rail/hover/rail, similar to that provided by Wightlink from Portsmouth Harbour.

The Monday-Saturday off-peak service is:

South Western Railway:

- 2 tph to London Waterloo via Guildford (1 fast, 1 stopping)
- 1 tph to London Waterloo via Basingstoke
- 3 tph to Portsmouth Harbour
- 1 tph to Southampton Central

Southern:

- 2 tph to London Victoria via Horsham
- 1 tph to Brighton via Worthing
- 2 tph to Portsmouth Harbour

Great Western Railway:

- 1 tph to Cardiff Central via Bristol Temple Meads
- 1 tph to Portsmouth Harbour

Preceding station	National Rail	Following station
Fratton	South Western Railway; Portsmouth Direct line West Coastway line	Portsmouth Harbour or Terminus
Fratton	Southern; West Coastway line	Portsmouth Harbour or Terminus
Fratton	Great Western Railway; West Coastway line	Portsmouth Harbour or Terminus
	Hovercraft services	
Terminus	Hovertravel; Hovercraft	Ryde Esplanade via Hoverbus
