= Hove =

Seaside resort in East Sussex, England

Hove: of Brighton and Hove
- City of Brighton and Hove
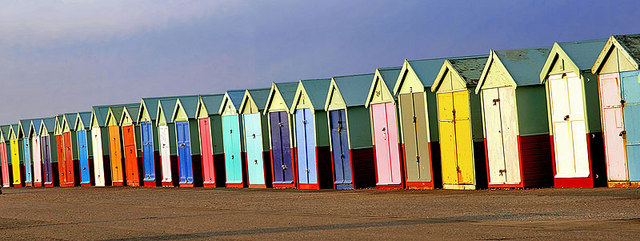
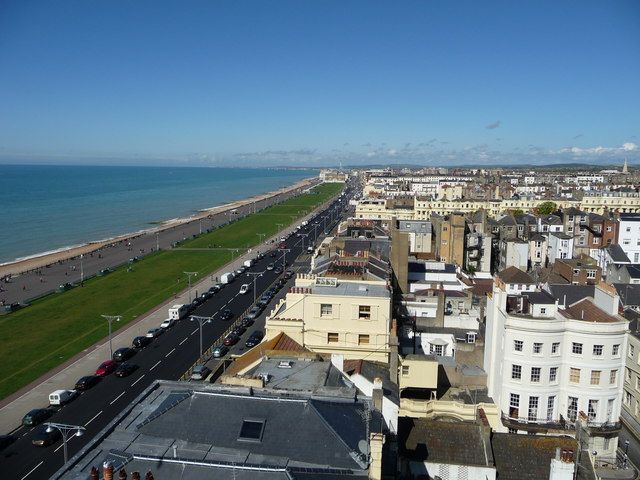
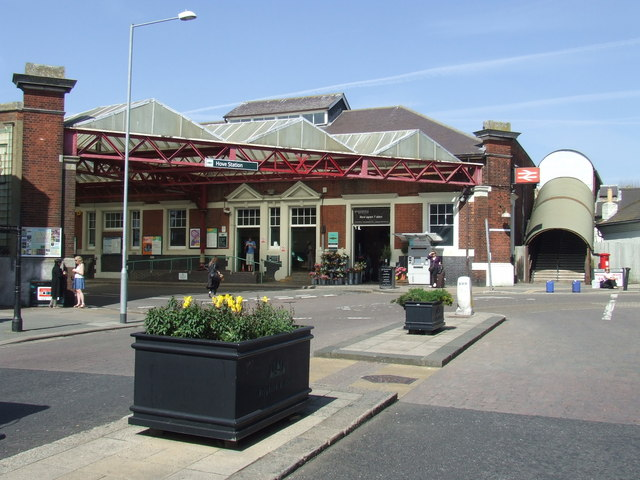
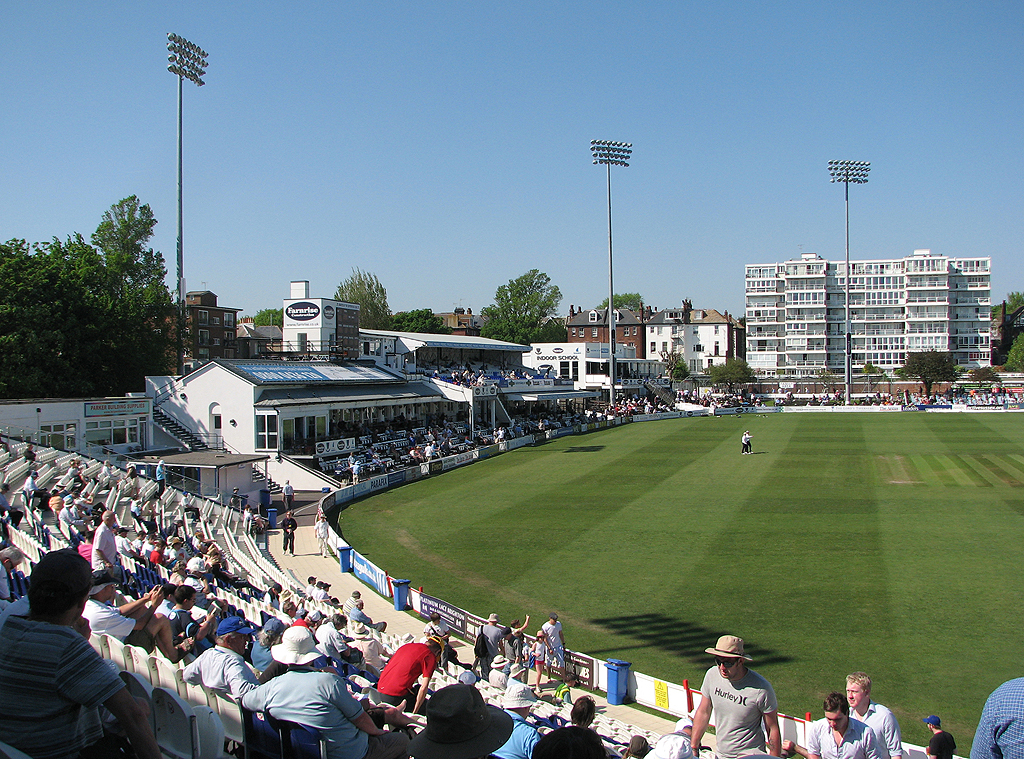
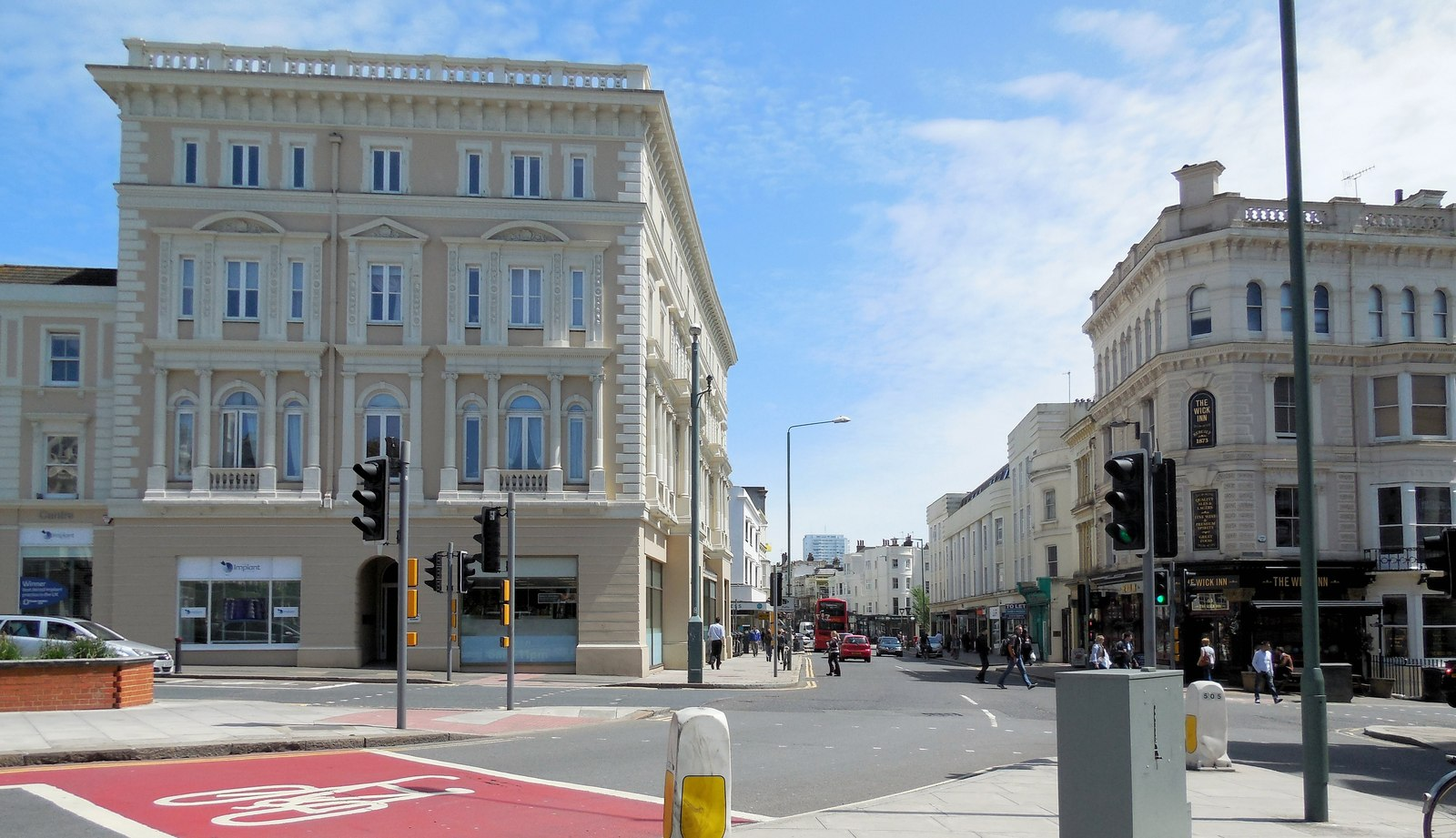
- Beach huts Sea front Hove station Sussex County Ground Western Road

- Location within East Sussex
- Population: 91,900
- OS grid reference: TQ285055
- Unitary authority: Brighton and Hove
- Ceremonial county: East Sussex
- Region: South East
- Country: England
- Sovereign state: United Kingdom
- Post town: HOVE
- Postcode district: BN3
- Dialling code: 01273
- Police: Sussex
- Fire: East Sussex
- Ambulance: South East Coast
- UK Parliament: Hove and Portslade

Hove (/hoʊv/ HOHV) is a seaside location in East Sussex, England. Alongside Brighton, it is one of the two main parts of the city of Brighton and Hove.

Originally a fishing village surrounded by open farmland, it grew rapidly in the 19th century in response to the development of its eastern neighbour Brighton; by the Victorian era it was a fully developed town with borough status. Neighbouring parishes such as Aldrington and Hangleton were annexed in the late 19th and early 20th centuries. The neighbouring urban district of Portslade was merged with Hove in 1974. In 1997, as part of local government reform, the borough merged with Brighton to form the Borough of Brighton and Hove; this unitary authority was granted city status in 2000.

== Name and etymology ==
Old spellings of Hove include Hou (Domesday Book, 1086), la Houue (1288), Huua (13th century), Houve (13th and 14th centuries), Huve (14th and 15th centuries), Hova (16th century) and Hoova (1675). The etymology was disputed at length during the 20th century as academics offered several competing theories. Suggestions included an Old Norse word meaning "hall", "sanctuary" or "barrow", in reference to the Bronze Age barrow near the present Palmeira Square; an Old English phrase æt þæm hofe meaning "at the hall"; (Note: This suggestion was given in The Place-Names of Sussex (1914) by R.G. Roberts.) the Old English hufe meaning "shelter" or "covering"; and the Middle English hofe meaning "anchorage". No other places in Britain are called Hove, and single-syllable names as a whole are rare in Sussex. The modern name was originally pronounced "Hoove" (/ˈhuːv/). The present pronunciation (/ˈhoʊv/) "is comparatively recent".

== Geography and topography ==
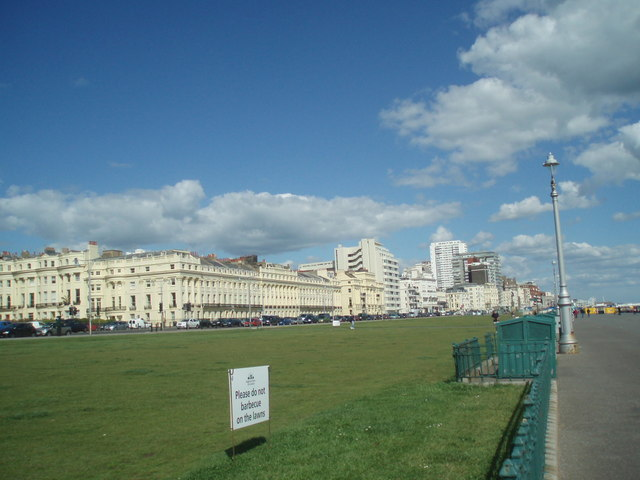
Hove Lawns is a large sea front garden situated to the west of the main Hove Esplanade

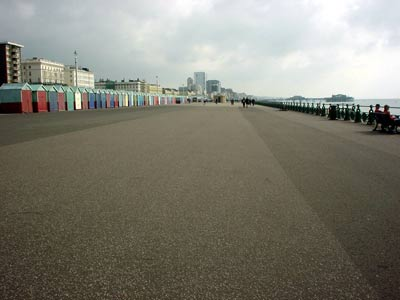
Hove promenade facing towards Brighton

Northern parts of Hove are built on chalk beds, part of the White Chalk Subgroup found across southeast England. There are also extensive areas of clay and sandy soil: areas of Woolwich Formation and Reading Formation clay, pockets of clay embedded with flint, and a large deposit of brickearth in the Aldrington area. Hove's beaches have the characteristics of a storm beach, and at high tide are entirely shingle, although low tide exposes sand between the sea-defence groynes, varying in extent from beach to beach. The water is then very shallow and suitable for paddling. On spring tides a greater expanse of sand is exposed beyond the end of the sea defences. The mean height above sea level of land in the old parish of Hove varied between 22 and 190 feet (6.7 and 57.9 m). After Hove became a borough and expanded to incorporate land from neighbouring parishes, the highest point was approximately 590 feet (180 m) above sea level. There are no rivers in Hove, but Westbourne Gardens at the western boundary of the old parish is named after the "West Bourne", which was still visible in the 19th century but which now runs underground, and a map of 1588 shows another stream called East Brook.

Until the 19th century the 778-acre (315 ha) parish was mostly agricultural. Three farms—Wick, Goldstone and Long Barn—dominated the area and owned most of the land, which was of good quality: agricultural writer Arthur Young described it as "uncommonly rich". Crops including oats, barley, corn and various vegetables were grown. Only in the 1870s were the last of the market gardens near Hove Street built over, and barley was grown near Eaton Road until the county cricket ground was built. Water was provided by wells west of Hove Street and between the coast road and the sea (the latter was destroyed in the Great Storm of 1703). The chalybeate spring on the Wick Farm estate (Note: Now the site of St Ann's Well Gardens.) was also used, especially by shepherds who drove their sheep between Hove, the South Downs and nearby villages along ancient drove roads. Some local shepherds supplemented their income by catching larks and northern wheatears and selling them for their meat; the latter were popular among fashionable visitors to Brighton. The birds were common on the hills and valleys around Hove, such as Goldstone Bottom. The practice died out when wheatears became a protected species in the late 18th century. The urban growth of Hove has shifted sheep-farming to more isolated parts of the South Downs, but several drove roads survive today as roads or footpaths. Hove Street and its northward continuation Sackville Road were originally known as Hove Drove and led on to the Downs. A long west–east route which crossed West Blatchington, Hove and Preston parishes on its way to Lewes now bears the names The Droveway, The Drove and Preston Drove. The section called The Droveway, on which the Goldstone Waterworks was built in the 1860s, had to be maintained as a right of way when Hove Park was built. A long diagonal footpath once known as Dyer's Drove runs for several miles from Portslade-by-Sea on to the Downs, and Drove Road in Portslade village may have been used since Roman times.

A large Sarsen stone called the Goldstone stood on farmland northwest of the village, now part of Hove Park. Links with druids were claimed; and some 19th-century sources stated it was part of a ring of stones similar to Stonehenge, and that the others were buried in a pond at Goldstone Bottom, one of the coombes (small dry valleys) between the Downs and the sea. The Goldstone was dug up and buried by a farmer, but was unearthed and re-erected in a new position in the park (Note: At 50.839433°N 0.173735°W) in 1906.

Hove has little ancient woodland. Only two small areas survive: one in St Ann's Well Gardens, and The Three Cornered Copse in the Tongdean area. The latter covers 11 acres (4.5 ha) and belonged to the Marquess of Abergavenny until Hove Borough Council bought it in January 1935. Trees in the copse include ash, beech, elm and sycamore, although more than 120 mature beech trees were blown down in the Great storm of 1987.

Much of Hove is urbanised, but in 1994 there were 896 hectares (2,210 acres) of downland—about 37.5% of the total acreage of the then borough. In common with other parts of the South Downs, much of land has been used as sheep pasture, but crop farming also takes place and large areas of land were claimed for military training during World War II. Toads Hole Valley, a 92-acre (37 ha) triangular site south of the Brighton Bypass, is "the last piece of unspoiled downland in Hove". It has been privately owned since 1937 and has been proposed for urban development for many years: in 2002 it was stated that "controversy rages over the future use of this land".

=== Acreage ===
Date	Parish area	Notes	Refs
To 19th century	778 acres (315 ha)	Extent of original parish	
1874	785.5 acres (317.9 ha)	Ordnance Survey map of 1874	
1894	1,594 acres (645 ha)	Aldrington parish added	
1 April 1928	4,010 acres (1,620 ha)	Preston Rural, West Blatchington and Patcham (part) parishes added	
1940	3,953 acres (1,600 ha)	Reported in Victoria County History of Sussex	
1994	5,896 acres (2,386 ha)		

=== Climate ===
Climate in this area has mild differences between highs and lows, and there is adequate rainfall year-round. The Köppen Climate Classification subtype for this climate is "Cfb" (Marine West Coast Climate/Oceanic climate).

Climate data for Hove, UK
Month	Jan	Feb	Mar	Apr	May	Jun	Jul	Aug	Sep	Oct	Nov	Dec	Year
Mean daily maximum °C (°F)	8 (46)	8 (46)	10 (50)	13 (55)	16 (61)	18 (64)	20 (68)	21 (70)	19 (66)	15 (59)	11 (52)	8 (46)	14 (57)
Mean daily minimum °C (°F)	3 (37)	3 (37)	5 (41)	6 (43)	10 (50)	12 (54)	14 (57)	14 (57)	12 (54)	9 (48)	6 (43)	4 (39)	8 (47)
Average precipitation days	14	10	12	12	10	9	10	10	11	12	13	12	135
Source: Weatherbase

== History and development ==
=== Pre-Roman evidence ===
Fossilised remains from the Pleistocene era have been found in three locations in Hove: an 11-pound-2-ounce (5.0 kg) molar from Elephas antiquus, excavated from the garden of a house in Poplar Avenue; teeth from a juvenile elephant deep in the soil at Ventnor Villas; and a prehistoric horse's tooth in the soil near Hove Street.

During building work near Palmeira Square in 1856–57, workmen uncovered a substantial burial mound. A prominent feature of the landscape since 1200 BC, (Note: Radiocarbon dating dated the coffin inside the burial mound to 1239 BC.) the 20 feet (6.1 m)-high tumulus yielded, among other treasures, the Hove amber cup. Made of translucent red Baltic amber and approximately the same size as a regular china tea cup, the artefact can be seen in the Hove Museum and Art Gallery. Only one other has been found in Britain. Also buried in the coffin in which the amber cup was found were a stone battle-axe, a whetstone and a bronze dagger whose appearance is characteristic of the Wessex culture.

=== Domesday Book ===
There are entries for Brighton and Portslade (Bristelmestune and Porteslage) and small downland settlements like Hangleton (Hangetone), but nothing for the location of Hove itself.

=== Middle Ages and Renaissance ===
The first known settlement in Hove was around the 12th century when St Andrew's Church was established. Hove remained insignificant for centuries, consisting of just a single street running north–south some 250 m from the church, which by the 16th century was recorded as being in ruins. Hangleton Manor is a well-preserved 16th-century flint manor building. It is believed to have been built c. 1540 for Richard Bel(l)ingham, twice High Sheriff of Sussex, whose initials are carved into a fireplace, and whose coat of arms adorns a period plaster ceiling. The Manor is currently serving as a pub-restaurant and whilst it was once on open downland, it is now surrounded by the 20th-century Hangleton housing estate.

=== 18th century ===
In 1723 a traveller, the antiquary John Warburton, wrote, 'I passed through a ruinous village called Hove which the sea is daily eating up and is in a fair way of being quite deserted; but the church being quite large and a good distance from the shore may perhaps escape'. Nevertheless, in around 1702 The Ship Inn had been built at the seaward end of the main street, and was therefore vulnerable to erosion of the coast.

In 1724, Daniel Defoe wrote in reference to the south coast, 'I do not find they have any foreign commerce, except it be what we call smuggling and roguing; which I may say, is the reigning commerce of all this part of the English coast, from the mouth of the Thames to the Land's End in Cornwall."

The fertile coastal plain west of the Brighton boundary had significant deposits of brickearth and by c.1770 a brickfield had been established on the site of what would become Brunswick Square. Later, other brickfields were established further west, remaining until displaced by housing development.

=== Regency and Victorian developments ===
The census of 1801 recorded only 101 residents to Brighton's 7,339. By 1821, the year the Prince Regent was crowned George IV, the population had risen to 312, while that of Brighton, which became a highly fashionable resort during the Regency, had also trebled, to 24,429. The dwellings were then still clustered on Hove Street, surrounded by an otherwise empty landscape of open farmland. This relative isolated location of Hove, compared to Brighton, was ideal for smuggling and there was considerable illicit activity. Hove smugglers became notorious, with contraband often being stored in the now partially repaired St. Andrew's Church. Tradition has it that The Ship Inn was a favourite rendezvous for the smugglers, and in 1794 soldiers were billeted there. In 1818 there was a pitched battle on Hove beach between revenue men and smugglers, from which the latter emerged as the victors. As part of the concerted drive by Parliament to combat smuggling, a coastguard station was opened at the southern end of Hove Street in 1831, next to The Ship Inn.

Bull-baiting took place on Saint Andrew's Day and on the Tuesday after Easter Sunday, but the practice ceased after 1810 when a bull broke free and ran through the crowd. The bullring was between the coast road and the beach, southwest of Hove Street, and the fights were promoted by the Ship Inn—which also organised cockfighting matches, even after this activity was made illegal.

In the years following the Coronation of 1821 the Brunswick estate of large Regency houses with a theatre, riding schools and their own police was developed on the seafront near the boundary with Brighton. Although within Hove parish the residents of these elegant houses avoided the name of the impoverished village a mile to the west as an address. Straggling development along the coast loosely connected the estate to fashionable Brighton, so that name was used instead.

Dating from 1822, the Brighton to Shoreham turnpike crossed the north of Hove parish along the route of the present Old Shoreham Road.

The Brighton and Hove Gas Company was established in 1825 and built a gasworks next to St Andrew's Church in 1832. Houses in Brunswick Terrace were the first to be lit by gas. Production moved to a new gasworks at Portslade in 1871 and the Hove works became a storage facility. The site at Portslade was close to Shoreham Harbour, so coal could be transported to it directly. Increasing demand for gas meant a new 154 by 40 feet (47 m × 12 m) gasholder, one of the largest in Sussex, was built on the Hove site in 1877. Of novel construction for the time, it was used until September 1994.

By 1831 the development of the eastern end of the parish had increased the population to 1,360 but this brought few economic benefits to Hove village itself, with the historian Thomas Horsfield describing it in 1835 as 'a mean and insignificant assemblage of huts'.

St Andrew's Church was reconstructed and enlarged to its present form in 1836, to the design of the architect George Basevi (1794–1845), and features prominently in the background of paintings of the period. About this time, a very substantial and tall wall was built between the churchyard and adjoining gasworks, remaining in place to this day.

The flat coastal plain was useful for sport as from 1848 to 1871 England's oldest county club, Sussex County Cricket Club, used the Royal Brunswick Ground in Hove, situated roughly on the site of present-day Third and Fourth Avenues. In 1872 the club moved to the present County Cricket Ground, Hove.

Two further large estates were developed between Hove village and Brunswick, and both avoided using the name Hove: Cliftonville was designed, laid out and initially developed under Frederick Banister from the late 1840s; and West Brighton Estate in the 1870s.

West of Brunswick, the seafront of West Brighton Estate forms the end of a series of avenues, in numerical order beginning with First Avenue, mostly composed of fine Victorian villas built as another well-integrated housing scheme featuring mews for artisans and service buildings. Grand Avenue, The Drive, and the numbered avenues were developed through the 1870s and 1880s, with many of the buildings constructed by William Willett.

Hove's wide boulevards contrast with the bustle of Brighton, although many of the grand Regency and Victorian mansions have been converted into flats. Marlborough Court was once the residence of the Duchess of Marlborough, aunt of Winston Churchill. The Irish nationalist leader and Home Rule MP Charles Stewart Parnell used to visit his lover, the already married Kitty O'Shea at the house she rented in 1883 in Medina Villas, Hove. In the subsequent divorce action the cook alleged that Captain O'Shea returned home unexpectedly and Parnell beat a hasty retreat by climbing over the balcony and down a rope ladder. Parnell died at Hove in 1891 after marrying Kitty following her divorce.

The Hove Club, a private members' club located at 28 Fourth Avenue, was founded in 1882.

=== Twentieth century ===
In the 1910s eleven cottages were built on the beach on the Western Esplanade between Hove Lagoon and Portslade. Named Seaside Villas, these houses have attracted a number of famous residents. War poets David Jones and Robert Graves spent time there, as did the playwright Joe Orton. More recently it has been home to celebrities such as Adele, David Walliams, Zoe Ball and Heather McCartney. Another resident, DJ Fat Boy Slim, owned the nearby Big Beach Cafe between 2013 and 2025.

In 1966 Hove Town Hall designed by eminent architect Alfred Waterhouse burned down. It was replaced by a Brutalist building designed by local architect John Wells-Thorpe.

=== First World War ===
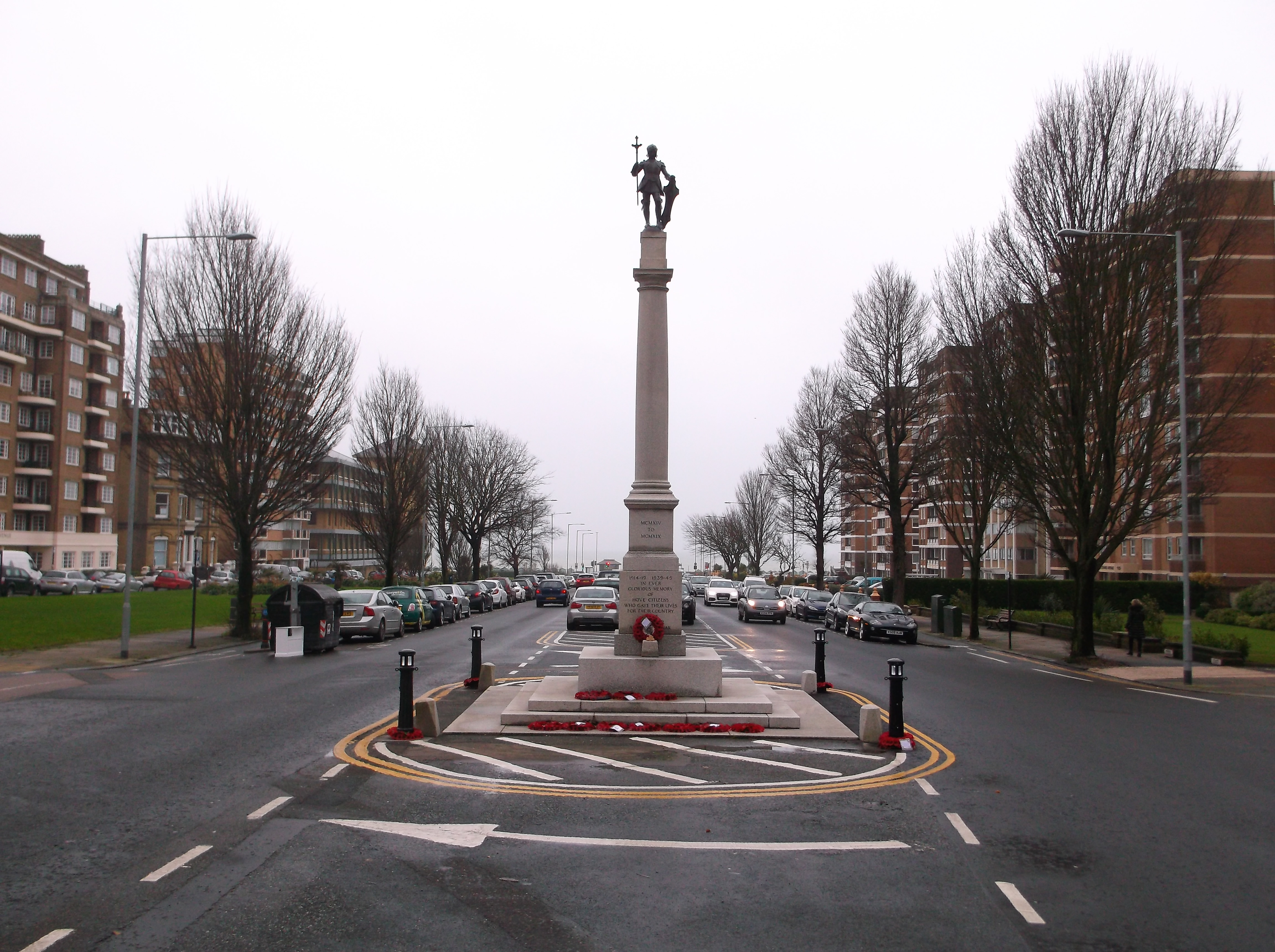
Hove War Memorial on Grand Avenue

Over 600 men from Hove were killed in the First World War. After the armistice, the town established a war memorial committee to decide on commemoration of the dead. The committee commissioned Sir Edwin Lutyens, the architect responsible for the Cenotaph on London's Whitehall which became the focus of national remembrance services. Lutyens proposed a similar cenotaph for Hove and went as far as constructing a wooden mock-up which was displayed on Hove Lawns but the committee rejected the design. The eventual result was a statue of Saint George atop a column, situated in the centre of Grand Avenue. The memorial does not contain the names of the fallen, which are instead recorded on a bronze plaque in Hove Library.

=== Second World War ===
At the outbreak of war, the recently completed Hove Marina leisure centre was immediately requisitioned as a training base for new officers of the Royal Navy Volunteer Reserve (RNVR) and was given the title HMS King Alfred. The establishment opened on 11 September 1939 and later expanded into Lancing College. By the end of the war, the base had trained 22,508 British, Commonwealth and allied officers for active sea service.

On 22 September 1939, the second Anglo-French Supreme War Council was held at Hove Town Hall to discuss the progress of the war and define future strategy. The British delegation included the Prime Minister, Neville Chamberlain and the Foreign Secretary, Lord Halifax, while the French party was led by the Minister of Defence and Prime Minister of France, Édouard Daladier and Commander-in-Chief of the Armies, Maurice Gamelin. Also present was Sir Alexander Cadogan who related that the town hall staff had only been told to expect some government officials, with the result that the prime minister was greeted with the exclamation; "Chamberlain! Cor Blimey!".

The Brighton and Hove area was subjected to heavy bombing by the Luftwaffe between 1940 and 1944, known collectively as the "Brighton Blitz", which resulted in the deaths of 198 civilians.

== Governance and politics ==
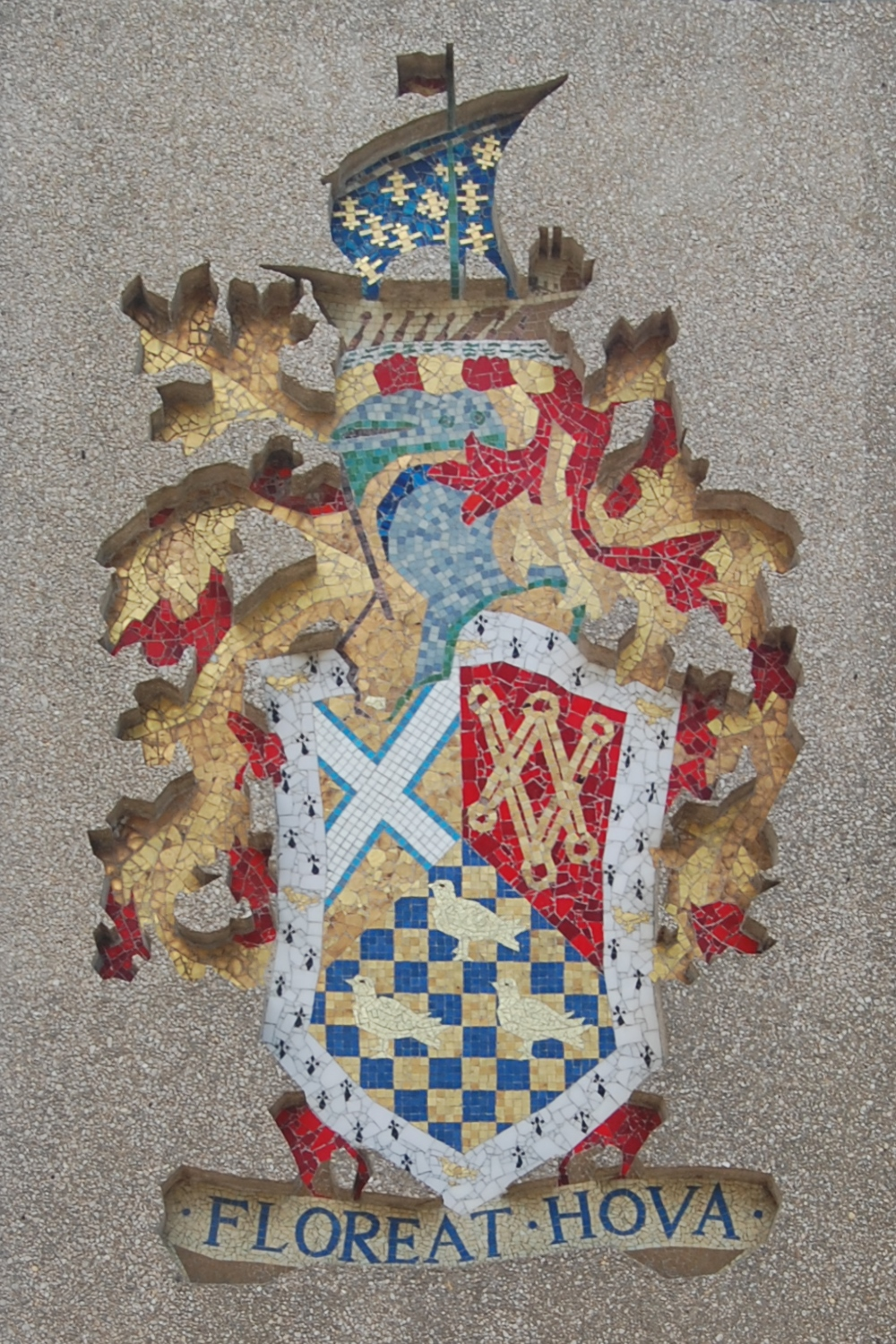
The Arms of the former Hove Borough on Hove Town Hall.

=== Former Hove borough ===
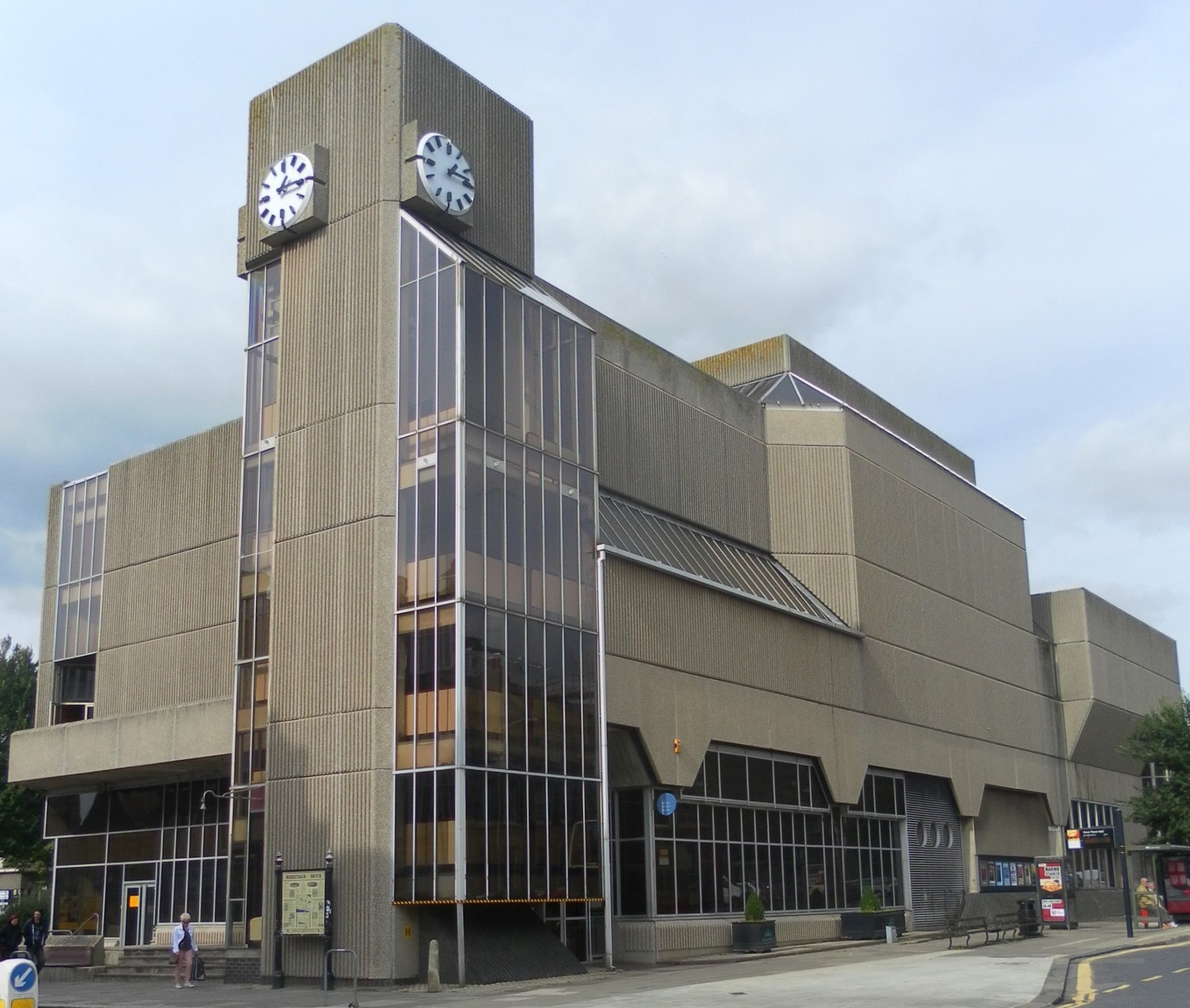
Hove Town Hall, completed in 1974

The ancient parish of Hove originally consisted of only 778 acres (315 ha) and in 1801 had a population of just 101. In 1829, local landowners petitioned parliament for powers to improve the Brunswick Town area of Hove with paving, lighting and drainage, resulting in the appointment of a body known as the Brunswick Commissioners in the following year. Subsequently, further commissioners were appointed for West Hove and to administer the Hove Police, all three bodies being united by the Hove Commissioners Act of 1873. In 1893 the civil parish of Aldrington was joined to Hove and in 1894, the Hove Commissioners were replaced by an Urban District Council. Finally in 1898 the Municipal Borough of Hove received its royal charter. This was enlarged in 1927 by the addition of the parishes of Preston Rural and Hangleton along with parts of West Blatchington and Patcham. The corporation consisted of a mayor, ten aldermen, and thirty councillors, elected from ten wards. The first town hall was built in 1882. On 1 April 1997 Brighton Borough Council and Hove Borough Council were merged to form Brighton and Hove City Council.

=== Coat of arms ===
While it was still a separate entity, Hove had its own coat of arms. The escutcheon's official heraldic description is "Tierced in pairle: 1. Or a saltire azure voided argent; 2. Gules two pairs of leg-irons interlaced argent; 3. Checky or and azure three martlets or, all in a border ermine charged with six martlets or". The design incorporates several features relevant to Hove's history. The ships of the French raiders who repeatedly attacked the coast in the Brighton and Hove area in the 16th century are represented by the crest. The saltire of Saint Andrew and the leg-shackles of Leonard of Noblac refer to the ancient parish churches of Hove and Aldrington, St Andrew's and St Leonard's respectively. William de Warenne, 1st Earl of Surrey held land in the Rape of Lewes at the time of the Norman Conquest including the territory covered by Hove; his colours were blue and gold, represented by the chequerboard pattern in the background of the shield.

== Commercial ==
The town centre received substantial renovation in the late 1990s when the popular George Street was pedestrianised. Some concern about the pedestrianisation and its impact (supposedly killing trade) was expressed by residents, the local newspaper The Argus, and small locally owned shops. However, these fears proved unfounded. In 2003 these small shops were joined by the centre's first large supermarket (a Tesco), built on the site of a former gasometer.

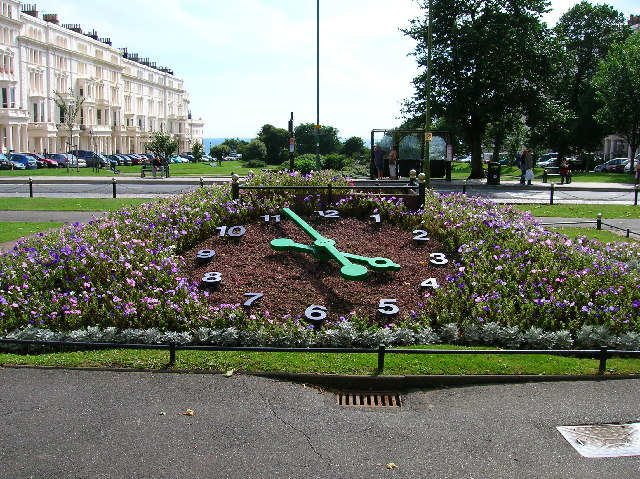
Floral Clock, Palmeira Square

== Landmarks and attractions ==
=== Places of worship ===
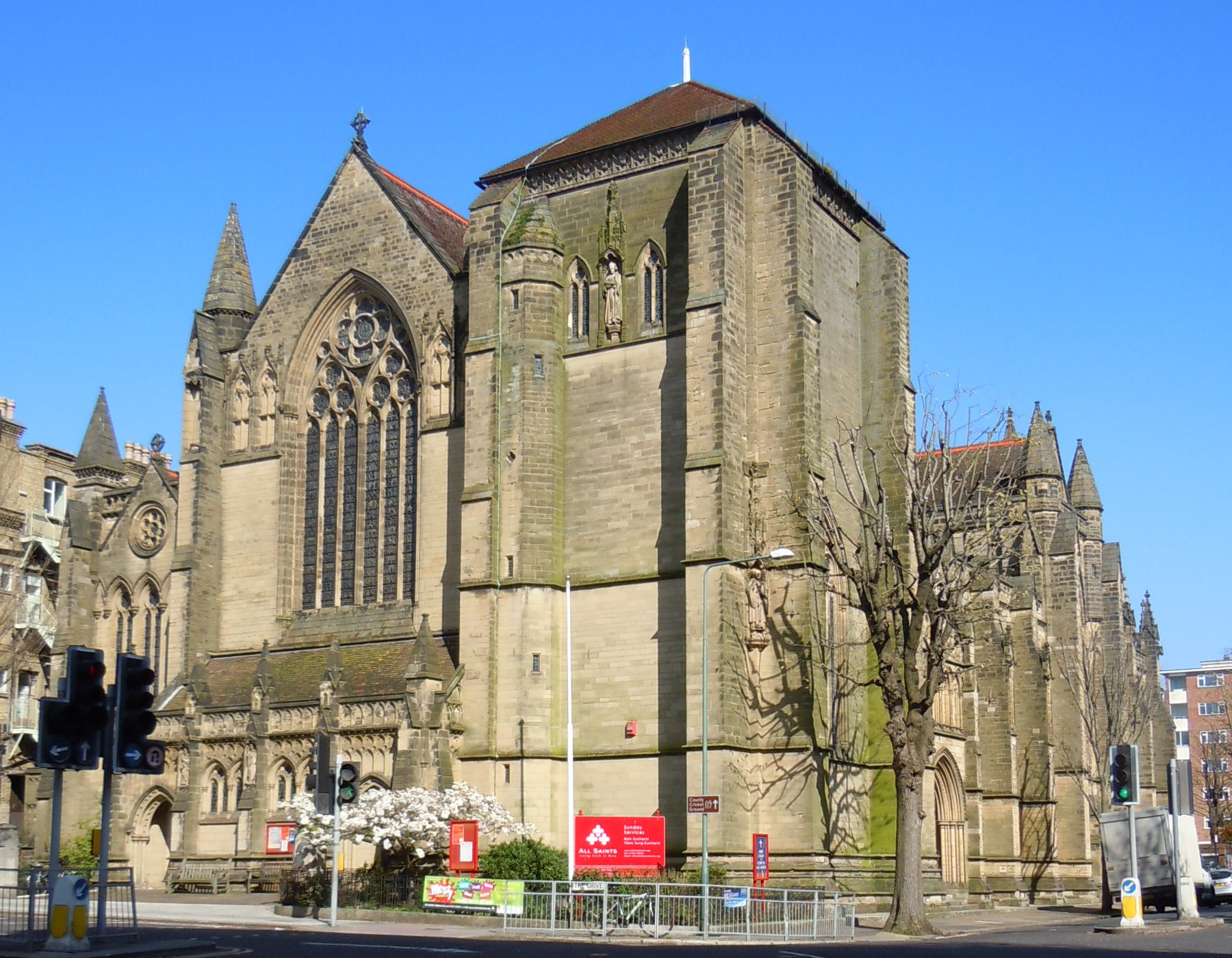
All Saints is the Church of England parish church of Hove.

Ecclesiastically, Hove was part of a joint parish with Preston between 1531 and 1879. The newly separate parish of Hove was then split several times in the late 19th and 20th centuries as the population grew and more Anglican churches were built. St Andrew's Church near the top end of Hove Street was the ancient parish church but was in ruins by the 1830s, when it was rebuilt in a Neo-Gothic style. St Helen's Church at Hangleton, lightly restored in the 1870s, retains the style of a simple Sussex downland church. St Peter's Church was abandoned and fell to ruins in the 17th century when West Blatchington became depopulated, but it was rebuilt in the 1890s. St Leonard's, the parish church of Aldrington, was also ruinous until 1878 when local population growth necessitated its restoration. (Note: The dedication is incorrectly recorded as St Nicholas in the Victoria County History of Sussex.)

A second church dedicated to St Andrew opened on the Brunswick estate in 1828. St John the Baptist's was built on Palmeira Square in 1852, followed by St Patrick's nearby in 1858 and Holy Trinity in central Hove in 1864. St Barnabas served the poorer areas around Sackville Road from 1883; All Saints on Eaton Road dates from 1889 to 1891; St Philip's was built in 1895 as a second church for Aldrington, and opened a mission hall (now Holy Cross Church) in the Poets' Corner area in 1903; St Thomas the Apostle opened on Davigdor Road in 1909; St Agnes was built north of Hove station in 1913; Bishop Hannington Memorial Church opened in West Blatchington in 1939; and The Knoll estate has been served by St Richard's Church since 1961, replacing a 1930s church hall. Four of these churches have closed: St Agnes in 1977, St Andrew's in Brunswick Town in 1990, St Thomas in 1993 and Holy Trinity in 2007. All Saints Church, a Grade I-listed building by John Loughborough Pearson, became the parish church of Hove in 1892.

The Church of the Sacred Heart was Hove's first Roman Catholic church. It was founded in 1876 by St Mary Magdalen's Church in Brighton, whose first priest left money in his will for a church in Hove. Work was delayed by disputes over the site, but after land on Norton Road was secured construction started in 1880 and the west end was finished in 1887. The Sacred Heart in turn founded a mission church in 1902 to serve the Aldrington and Portland Road areas of Hove. St Peter's Hall was used until the "startling" basilica-style red-brick St Peter's Church was opened in 1915. Mass was said in Hangleton from the 1940s in a hall and at the Grenadier pub, but in the 1950s land on Court Farm Road was bought for a church and St George's Church opened in 1968. It serves West Blatchington and Hangleton, and is now part of a joint parish with Southwick and Portslade.

Hove was included in the Lewes and Brighton Methodist Circuit from 1808, although at times during the 19th century no Methodists (Wesleyan, Primitive or Bible Christian) lived in the area. A secondhand tin tabernacle was erected on Portland Road for Wesleyans in 1883, and the present Hove Methodist Church was built on the site in 1896. A Bible Christian chapel was built in 1905 on Old Shoreham Road but never thrived; it closed in 1947 and was sold to a charity. Primitive Methodists worshipped at a large chapel on Goldstone Villas from 1878 until 1933. It was converted into offices in 1968.

Hove's General Baptist congregation developed in the 1870s and met in a gymnasium and a tin tabernacle until Holland Road Baptist Church opened in 1887. A deacon from the church started holding Baptist meetings in a new church building on the Hangleton estate in 1957. It now has the name Oasis Church. A former Congregational mission hall in Aldrington, built in 1900, is home to the Baptist-aligned New Life Christian Church. Stoneham Road Baptist Church was founded in 1904 by the Holland Road church to serve the Poets' Corner area. It closed and was demolished in 2008. Baptists also met in Connaught Terrace from 1879, and Strict Baptists worshipped at Providence Chapel on Haddington Street from 1880 until 1908.

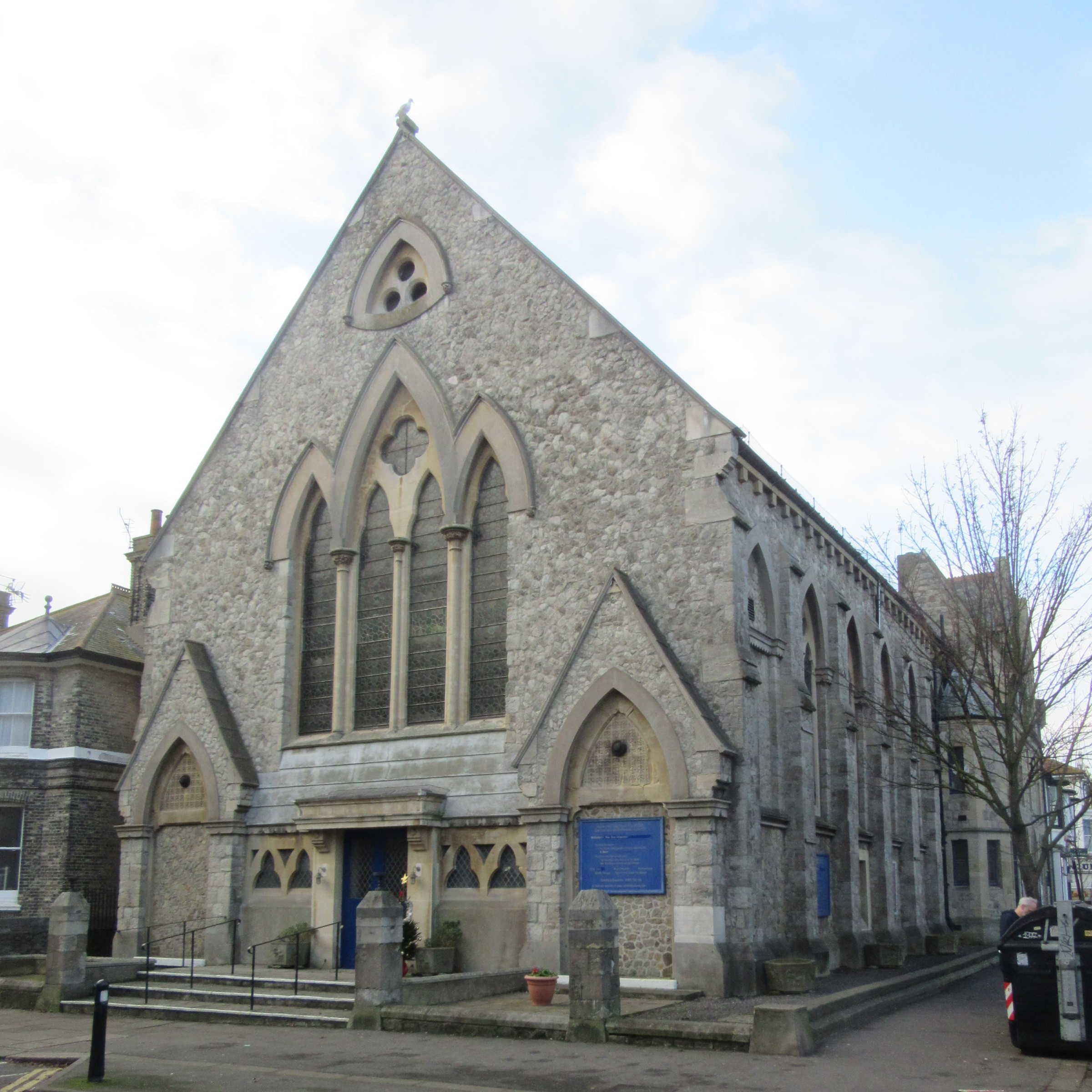
Central United Reformed Church was built 1870 for Congregationalists.

A Congregational chapel was built on Ventnor Villas in 1870, and 41 years later St Cuthbert's Presbyterian Church opened on Holland Road. After the two denominations merged in 1972 to form the United Reformed Church, the congregations came together in 1980 at the Ventnor Villas premises. These were renamed Central United Reformed Church and continue to serve as the main centre for that denomination in Hove. St Cuthbert's was demolished in 1984. In 1938 trustees of the Congregational chapel founded another on the Hangleton estate. Hounsom Memorial Church is also now part of the United Reformed Church.

The Salvation Army have worshipped in Hove since 1882 and occupy a citadel built in 1890 on Sackville Road. Jehovah's Witnesses meet in Aldrington at a Kingdom Hall which was built in 1999 to replace a hall of 1950. A non-denominational gospel hall stands on Edward Avenue in the Goldstone Valley area. The Christian Arabic Evangelical Church meets in a converted bungalow on Old Shoreham Road in Aldrington. A former Anglican church of 1909 on Davigdor Road has served Coptic Orthodox Christians from a wide area since 1994, when it was rededicated as St Mary and St Abraam Church by Pope Shenouda III of Alexandria. Buddhists have a cultural centre and place of worship at a former convent near Furze Hill. Other former churches in Hove include an Elim Pentecostal chapel (in use 1929–1994) on Portland Road, the Seventh-day Adventist chapel on Hove Place, whose congregation now meet at Hove Methodist Church, and a former mission hall in the Poets' Corner area which was used until c. 1981 as a chapel for the local Society of Dependants sect.

=== Hove Museum of Creativity ===
Hove Museum of Creativity is a municipally owned museum which houses a permanent collection of toys, contemporary crafts, fine art and local history artefacts, as well as holding temporary exhibitions of contemporary crafts.

== Education ==
Hove's primary schools are: West Blatchington Primary and Nursery School, St. Andrew's CE School, Hove Junior School, Benfield Junior School, Goldstone Primary School, Hangleton Junior School, Cottesmore St Mary's Catholic School, Mile Oak Primary School, Bilingual Primary School, Brunswick Primary School and Aldrington CE School. There are four secondary schools serving the area: Blatchington Mill School, Cardinal Newman Catholic School, Hove Park School and King's School.

Brighton Hove & Sussex Sixth Form College (BHASVIC), formerly Brighton, Hove & Sussex Grammar School, is a dedicated place of further education, along with the Connaught Centre, Hove Park Sixth Form Centre and Blatchington Mill Sixth Form College.

Brighton is also the location of private colleges such as Hove College. Founded in 1977, Hove College is a non-profit private higher education institution and offers courses accredited by OCN London.

Hove has a number of private schools including Deepdene School, Lancing College Preparatory School (formerly Mowden School) The Montessori Place, The Drive Prep School and St Christopher's School (now part of Brighton College). There are also language schools for foreign students.

== Sport and leisure ==
The home of Sussex County Cricket Club is at County Cricket Ground, Hove. It is used for county, national and international matches, music concerts, fireworks displays, and has found resurgent popularity with the introduction of Twenty20.

Until 1997 Hove was home to the Brighton & Hove Albion F.C.'s Goldstone Ground. The football club is known as The Seagulls and a seagull crest has been used since 1977. In September 2007, planning permission was confirmed for the club's new ground, at Falmer, still within the city limits but on the Brighton side. The new stadium started development in late 2008, with the first game being played in August 2011.

Hove is home to a detachment of the Sussex Army Cadet Force, a volunteer youth organisation, sponsored by the Ministry of Defence, which accepts cadets aged between 12 and 18 years of age.

Brighton & Hove Hockey Club is a field hockey club and its home ground is based in Hove.

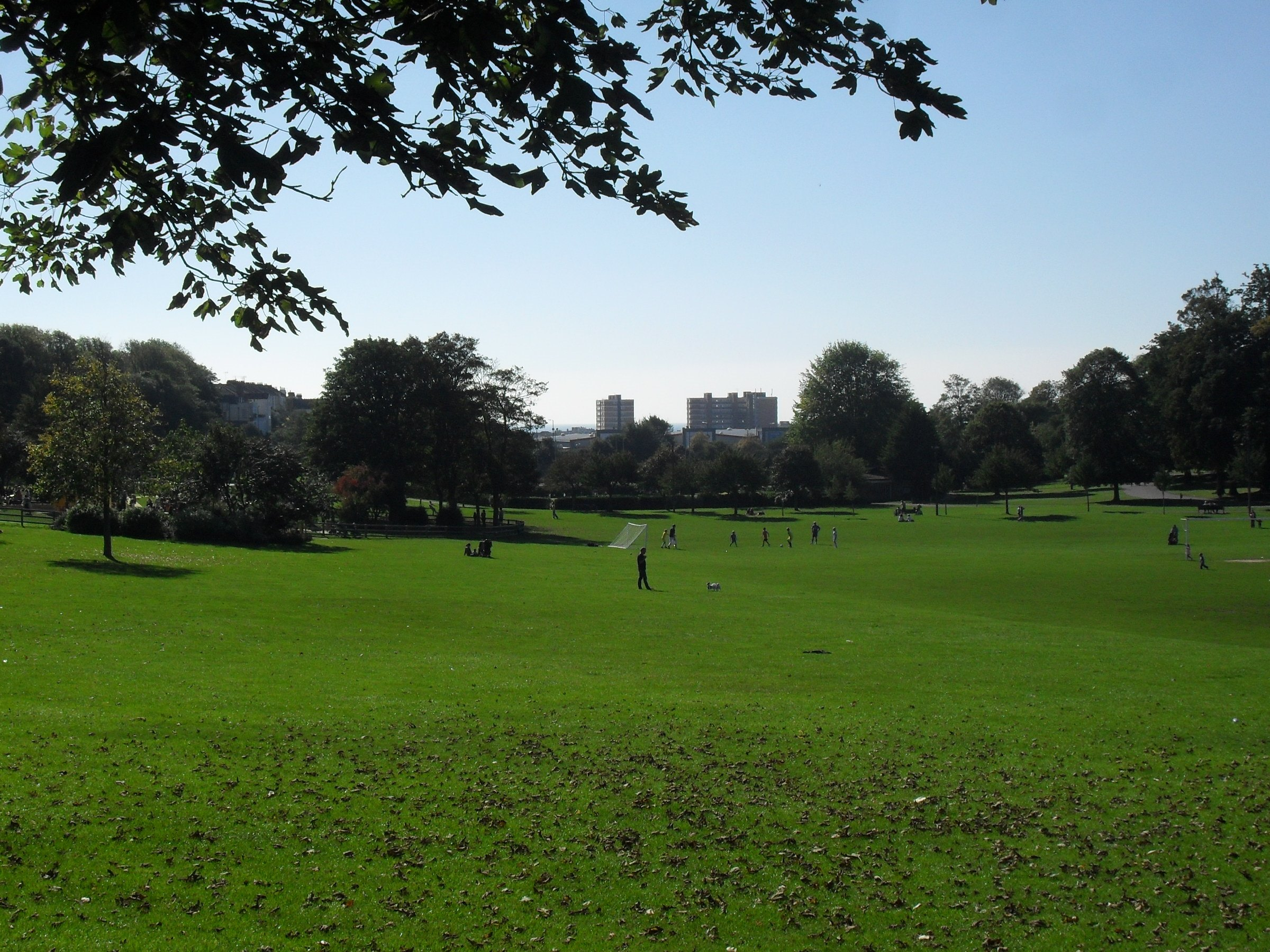
Southward view across Hove Park, a popular site for sports and recreational activities

There are a number of parks in Hove including Hove Park and St. Anne's Well Gardens which has many native and exotic trees and a scented garden. The King Alfred Centre which is currently a leisure centre with swimming pool and a couple of gyms on the seafront. In March 2007 Brighton and Hove City Council gave planning permission for a £290 million development designed by Frank Gehry. This project was scrapped in January 2009 when the developer pulled out.

Hove Promenade parkrun, situated by Hove Lawns started in July 2015 and is one of five such free, timed 5 km runs across the city. Hove Lawns is a stretch of lawns along the seafront divided into two parts – Brunswick Lawns and King's Lawns.

The Monarch's Way long-distance footpath threads south-eastwards across the town from the Downs, before heading west along the seafront towards its terminus at Shoreham-by-Sea.

== "Hove, actually" ==
A well-known reply by residents of Hove, usually humorous, when asked if they live in Brighton is "Hove, actually" thus maintaining a distinction with their neighbour. One source has identified the locally resident actor Laurence Olivier (who lived in Brighton) as the origin of the phrase. In the 1990s the Hove borough council used the slogan "Hove, actually" to promote the town for tourism.

== Transport ==
Hove has several A-roads. The A259 runs along Kingsway, forming the main seafront road in Hove. The A270 Old Shoreham Road, another major west–east route further north, was originally part of the A27 trunk road before the Brighton bypass was built. The A2023 runs north from the A259 through central Hove and West Blatchington, meeting the A2038 on the edge of Hangleton and continuing to a junction with the A23 London–Brighton road. Other main routes, all with B-road status, include Grand Avenue and The Drive (B2185), Cromwell Road and Davigdor Road (B2120) and New Church Road, Church Road and Western Road (B2066).

There were 34.28 miles (55.17 km) of roads in Hove borough in 1906, rising to 74 miles (119 km) in 1948. Even in the latter year some were still paved with wood.

=== Buses ===
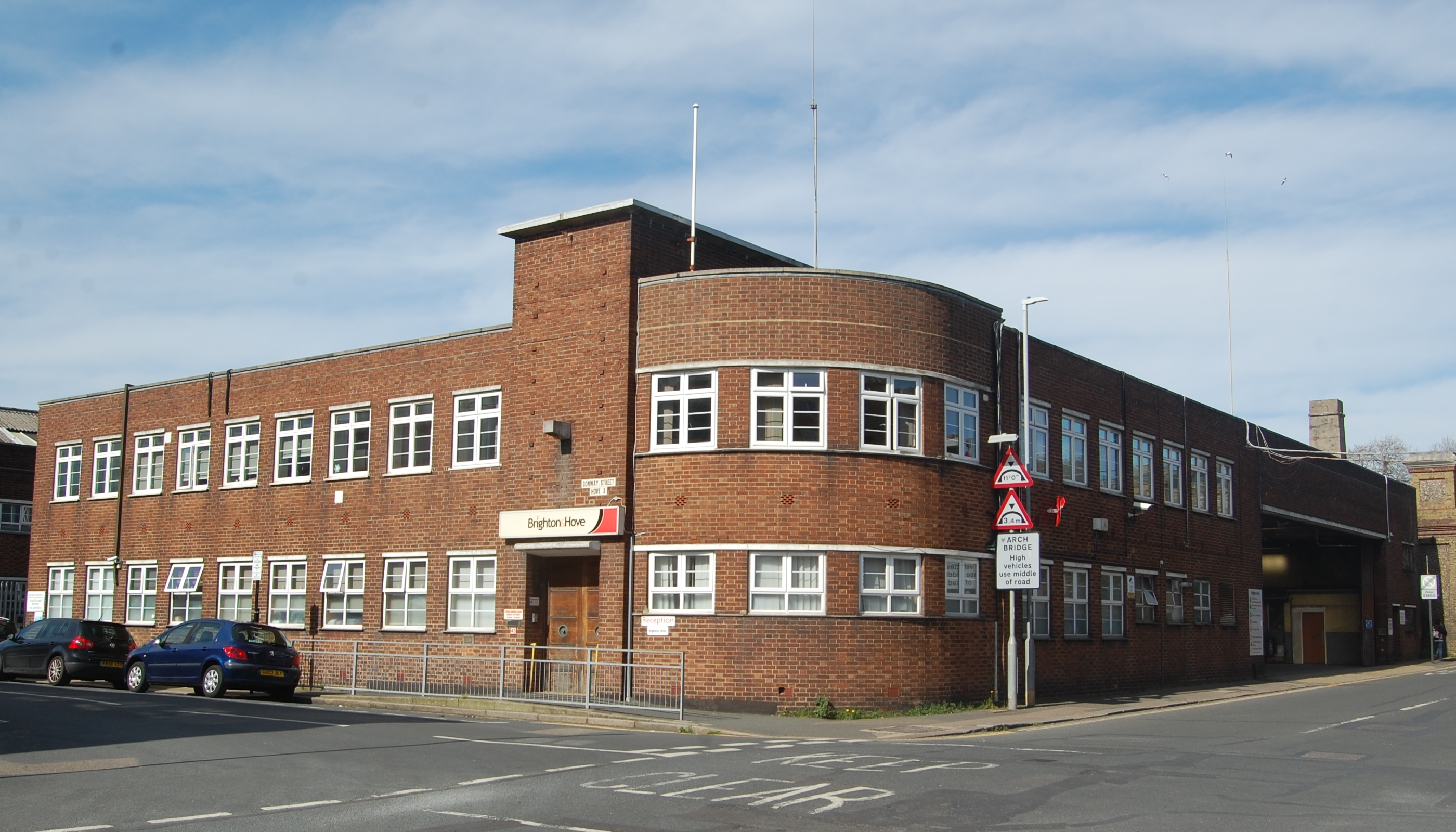
Brighton & Hove Bus and Coach Company has a depot and workshop at Conway Street.

Many bus routes serve central Hove, and Church Road/New Church Road and Blatchington Road/Portland Road are important bus corridors. Most services are operated by Brighton & Hove, a bus company which has been owned by the Go-Ahead Group since November 1993. Routes include the 1 and 1X to Whitehawk and Mile Oak, the 2 to Shoreham-by-Sea, Steyning and Rottingdean, the 5, 5A and 5B to the Hangleton estate and the Hollingbury and Patcham estates in Brighton, the 6 to Brighton railway station, the 7 to Brighton Marina, the 21 to the Goldstone Valley estate and Brighton Marina, the 25 to the Universities of Sussex and Brighton, the 46 to Southwick and Hollingbury and the 49 to Moulsecoomb. The Big Lemon operates a circular route serving Portslade, the Knoll Estate and Hangleton and another serving Knoll Estate and Hangleton and continuing to Brighton railway station, central Brighton, Brighton Marina, Rottingdean and Saltdean. Stagecoach South operates the Coastliner 700 route through Hove, serving Brighton to the east and Shoreham-by-Sea, Worthing and Littlehampton to the west, with connections to Bognor Regis, Chichester and Portsmouth. Several National Express coaches on route 025 (Worthing–London) serve Hove each morning, calling at a stop on the A259 near the King Alfred Leisure Centre.

Hove's first bus service ran from the Ship Inn on Hove Street to Black Rock near Rottingdean and started on 11 May 1853. Seven return journeys ran daily. Local businessman A.C. Elliott became a licensed bus operator in 1879 with ten vehicles, 12 conductors and 13 drivers, running services between Hove and central Brighton. Other operators soon started running buses in competition, and the Hove Commissioners "[kept] a tight rein on things" by issuing and renewing licences once a year. From 1901, horse-drawn buses began to be replaced with petrol-driven vehicles and, from 1908, by experimental electric buses as well. Thomas Tilling became a major operator in Hove after gaining licences for Portslade–Brighton routes in 1912. He operated from premises on Holland Road until new garages and offices were built on Conway Street in 1916. The company was renamed the Brighton, Hove and District Omnibus Company in 1935, and the Conway Street premises were rebuilt in 1939–40 to the design of H.R. Starkey. By 1927 Southdown Motor Services was another major local operator: Hove Council licensed 100 of its vehicles for local and longer-distance work, and the company's main works was at Portslade. It became part of the National Bus Company in 1968 along with the Brighton, Hove and District Omnibus Company. As a result, the latter's works at Conway Street closed in 1969. The companies separated again in 1986 and the former Tilling operations became the Brighton & Hove Bus and Coach Company, now the city's main operator. The Conway Street premises were retained as a bus garage.

=== Railways ===
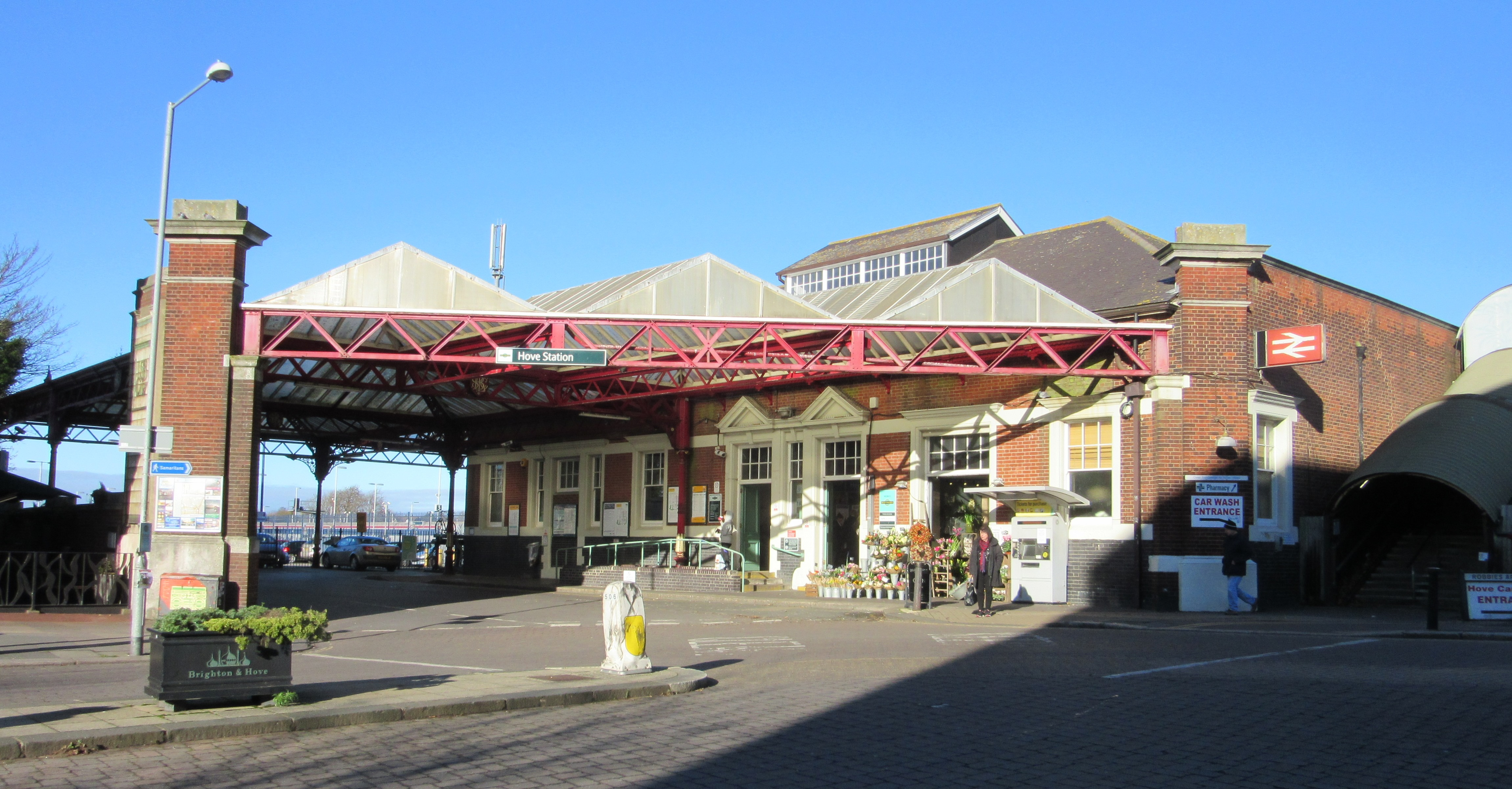
Hove railway station is in central Hove at the top of Goldstone Villas.

The first railway station named Hove opened at the top of Holland Road on 12 May 1840 on the Brighton to Shoreham-by-Sea line (now the West Coastway line). It closed on 1 March 1880, but a new station named Holland Road Halt opened on approximately the same site on 3 September 1905. Its two timber platforms were still in place when it closed permanently on 7 May 1956.

The present Hove railway station, 1 mile 35 chains (2.3 km) west of Brighton station, opened at the top of Goldstone Villas on 1 October 1865 with the name Cliftonville; it was renamed West Brighton in 1879, Hove and West Brighton in 1894, and received its present name in 1895. Further west, 1 mile 71 chains (3.0 km) from Brighton, Aldrington railway station opened with the name Dyke Junction Halt on 3 September 1905, taking the name Aldrington Halt from 17 June 1932 when the platforms were resited and rebuilt. Portslade railway station, serving Aldrington and West Hove as well as Portslade village and Portslade-by-Sea, opened with the line on 12 May 1840 but was closed between 1847 and 1857. Its original station buildings survive, but goods facilities were withdrawn in 1968. It is 2 miles 73 chains (4.7 km) west of Brighton. There is a level crossing at the west end. All three stations are managed and served by Southern.

As of 2024, during the off-peak Monday - Saturday, Hove station sees half hourly services to London Victoria (via Haywards Heath), at least quarter hourly service to Brighton, services every half an hour to Southampton, at least half hourly to Littlehampton and at least hourly services to Bognor Regis and Portsmouth and Southsea.

Immediately west of Aldrington station, the Brighton and Dyke Railway branched off and headed north through West Blatchington and Hangleton to a terminus at Devil's Dyke on the South Downs. Golf Club Halt opened in 1891 to serve Brighton and Hove Golf Course, and Rowan Halt opened in 1933 on Rowan Avenue to serve the Hangleton and West Blatchington areas. The 3-mile-40-chain (5.6 km) branch line opened on 1 September 1887; it closed permanently on 31 December 1938, having already been closed for three years from 1917.

The Cliftonville Curve opened in 1879 to connect the West Coastway line with the Brighton main line, allowing trains to travel between the lines without reversing at Brighton station. It passes through a 535-yard (489 m) tunnel. There is also a 220-yard (200 m) tunnel between Brighton and Hove stations.

=== Taxis ===
The first Hackney carriage licences were issued by the Hove Police Commissioners in 1859. Within 30 years passengers could choose between a wide range of vehicles, including first- and second-class cabs, hand-pulled invalid carts, goat-drawn chaises, landaus and broughams. The first motor cab was licensed in 1908, but horse-drawn carriages persisted until after 1925. Hackney carriages are now licensed by the city council are coloured white and aqua. Fares are also regulated by the council. There are 17 taxi ranks in Hove, (Note: Including Hangleton and West Blatchington, but excluding Portslade.) including two which operate at night only.

== Notable residents ==
- Luigi Arditi (1822–1903), Italian composer
- Jonathan Bailey (born 1988), actor
- Charles Busby (1786–1834), architect
- Vivien Chartres (1893–1941), violinist and musical child prodigy
- Carl Cox, house and techno DJ
- Rear Admiral Sir John Hindmarsh (1785–1860), naval officer and first Governor of South Australia
- Sir Jack Hobbs (1882–1963), cricketer
- Thomas Gardner Horridge (1857–1938), Liberal Party politician and judge
- Ann James (1925–2011), English-born Canadian artist and educator
- Michael Jayston (1935–2024), actor
- Richard Jefferies (1848–1887), nature writer, lived at 87 Lorna Road, from 1882 to 1884 and wrote there his spiritual autobiography "The Story of My Heart" (1883)
- Mary-Belle Kirschner (Belle Delphine) (born 1999), South African-born English Internet celebrity and model.
- Charley Mitchell (1861–1918), boxer
- Charles Stewart Parnell (1846–1891), Irish Nationalist politician
- Margaret Powell, writer (1907–1984), born in Hove; there is a bus named after her and a blue plaque on her house
- Howard Kemp Prossor (1867–1959), art connoisseur and inventor of the "colour cure" for shell shock
- Marguerite Steinheil, Baroness Abinger (1869–1954), French demimonde, later British peeress
- Anthony Trafford, Baron Trafford (1932–1989), physician and Conservative politician
- Bernard Youens (1914–1984), actor (notably as Stan Ogden in Coronation Street)
- Nigel Glockler (born 1953), drummer - Saxon, Toyah (band), Six By Six

== See also ==
- Grade I listed buildings in Brighton and Hove
- List of conservation areas in Brighton and Hove
- List of landmarks and notable buildings of Brighton and Hove
- List of people from Brighton and Hove
- List of places of worship in Brighton and Hove
- Hove Borough Council elections for the political history of the former borough council which governed the town from 1974 to 1997.

== Bibliography ==
- Body, Geoffrey (1984). Railways of the Southern Region. PSL Field Guide. Cambridge: Patrick Stephens. ISBN 978-0-85059-664-9. OCLC 11496293.
- Collis, Rose (2010). The New Encyclopaedia of Brighton. (based on the original by Tim Carder) (1st ed.). Brighton: Brighton & Hove Libraries. ISBN 978-0-9564664-0-2.
- Dale, Antony (1989). Brighton Churches. London: Routledge. ISBN 0-415-00863-8.
- Elleray, D. Robert (2004). Sussex Places of Worship. Worthing: Optimus Books. ISBN 0-95-331-3271.
- Middleton, Judy (1979). A History of Hove. Chichester: Phillimore & Co. ISBN 0-85033-325-3.
- Middleton, Judy (2002). The Encyclopaedia of Hove & Portslade. Brighton: Brighton & Hove Libraries.
- s.n. (1998). A selection of notes on the History of Hove and Brighton including a History of Hove street names and early maps of Hove. Brighton: Brighton & Hove Libraries.
- The Diocese of Arundel & Brighton (2016). Diocese of Arundel & Brighton Diocesan Directory 2016. Crawley: Roman Catholic Diocese of Arundel and Brighton.
- Willy, Frank (1978). A Short History of Hove. Hove: East Sussex County Council (Brighton and Hove Environmental Study Group).
