= Goldstone Ground =

Former sporting ground in Hove, Sussex, England

Coordinates: 50°50′17.09″N 0°10′26.72″W

- The Goldstone
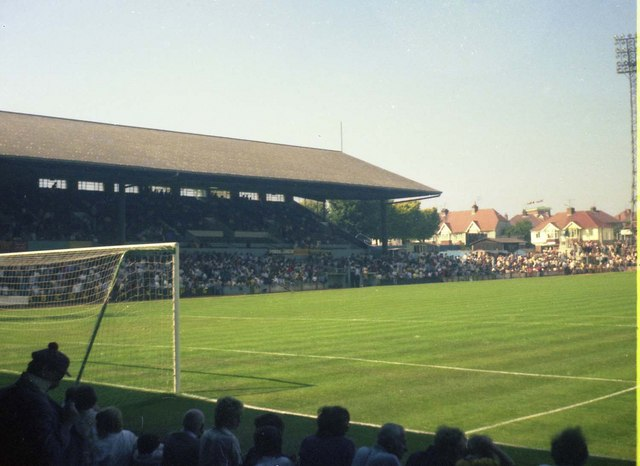
- Goldstone Ground in 1976
- Interactive map of Goldstone Ground
- Location: Hove, England
- Capacity: 18,203 (At the time of closure)
- Record attendance: 36,747 (Brighton and Hove Albion v Fulham, 27 December 1958)

Construction
- Opened: 1901
- Closed: 1997
- Demolished: 1997

Tenants
- Hove F.C. (1901–1904); Brighton & Hove Albion (1902–1997)

The Goldstone Ground (or The Goldstone) was a football stadium in Hove, East Sussex that was the home ground of Brighton & Hove Albion between 1902 and 1997.

== History ==
The Goldstone Ground stood on Old Shoreham Road, Hove, opposite Hove Park in a partly residential area. The area was previously part of Goldstone Farm and was first used for a football match by Hove F.C. on 7 September 1901. Albion played there for the first time on 22 February 1902, and it became the club's permanent home the next season.

The main West Stand was largely built in 1958 and consisted of seating and terraces. The South Stand was originally built in 1949 and served family spectators. The North Stand was built in 1984 and consisted solely of terracing. The East Stand was formed of uncovered terraces. Floodlights were first installed in 1961. The ground also hosted football games for the 1948 Olympic Games, one of only two grounds outside London (the other being Fratton Park).

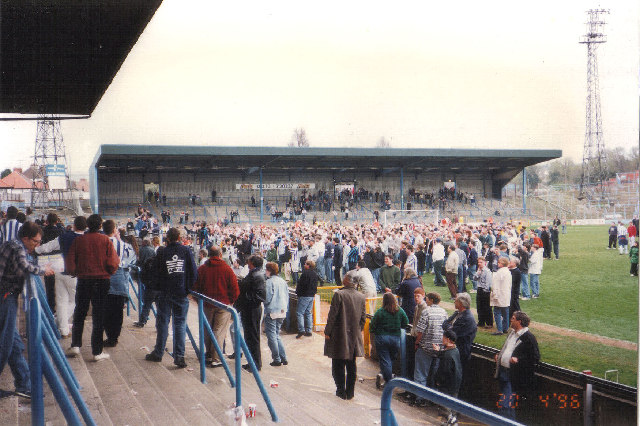
The stadium before closure in 1996

On 23 September 1992, David Beckham made his professional début at this stadium, coming on as a substitute for Manchester United in a League Cup second round tie.

The ground was used as the home venue for both Tottenham Hotspur and Wimbledon for their pre-season 1995 UEFA Intertoto Cup campaigns, whereafter both clubs received one season bans from European football by UEFA for fielding under-strength teams. The bans were later overturned on appeal.

== Closure and sale ==
The Taylor Report of January 1990 required all English clubs in the top two divisions to have an all-seater stadium by August 1994. Brighton were in the Second Division at the time and reached the playoff final the following year, but defeat to Notts County ended their hopes of reclaiming the First Division place which they had previously held from 1979 to 1983. Relegation a year later meant that Brighton were no longer covered by the requirements of the Taylor Report, and rising debts meant that the Goldstone Ground remained undeveloped and there were no serious plans for relocation. In 1996, Brighton were relegated to the fourth tier of the English football for the first time since the 1960s.

The final match at The Goldstone Ground was held on 26 April 1997, in which Brighton beat Doncaster Rovers 1–0. The result lifted Brighton off the bottom of Division Three and meant that either a draw or a win in their visit to Hereford United for their final game of that season the following weekend would prevent relegation to the Conference and preserve their Football League status. Brighton went on to draw that game 1-1 and thus secured survival, avoiding becoming the first former members of the top flight or the first major cup finalists to be relegated to the Conference, and sending their opponents down instead.

Between 1902 and 1997 the ground had admitted 22.9 million supporters to 2,174 games. The largest attendance at the Goldstone was 36,747 when the Albion played Fulham on 27 December 1958.

The ground's freehold was sold by the club's board of directors, who were trying to clear the club's mounting debts in an attempt to avoid bankruptcy, although no alternative home ground had been arranged, and the fans were not consulted. The then-chairman, Bill Archer, aimed to profit from the sale of the lucrative development land on which the Goldstone stood. A proposed ground-share with Portsmouth – their nearest Football League neighbours – never materialised and the club eventually arranged a ground-share with Gillingham at their Priestfield Stadium, over 70 miles from Brighton.

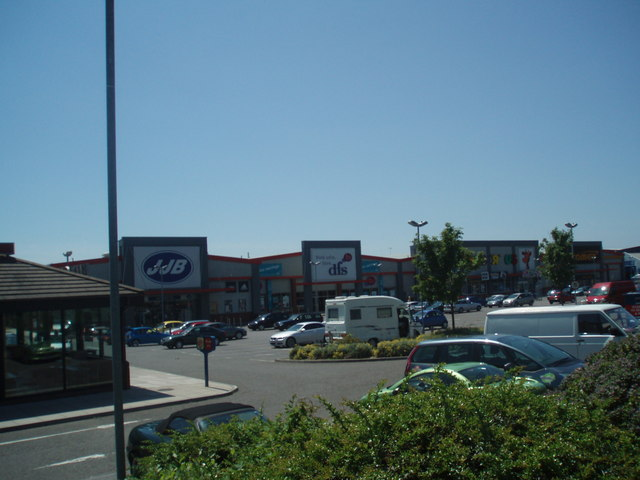
The Goldstone Retail Park, circa 2005, built on the site of the former Goldstone Ground.

The planned sale of the club's stadium provoked two pitch invasions by angry fans in protest against it. A pitch invasion late in the 1995–96 season, when the Seagulls were relegated to Division Three, resulted in a suspended sentence of three points deducted and a game played behind closed doors for the club. A similar protest on 1 October 1996 in a league game against Lincoln City meant that a Football League hearing on 9 December that year saw them deducted two league points. The club later appealed against the points deduction but their appeal was rejected, although ultimately they still managed to avoid relegation from the Football League by a narrow margin that year.

The Goldstone Ground was sold to property developers and the site was redeveloped as a retail park, currently known as the Goldstone Retail Park.

After returning to the Brighton area in 1999 following two years in Gillingham, Brighton & Hove Albion played at the Withdean Stadium, an athletics stadium about two miles north of the city centre. By this stage, a site at Falmer had been identified as Brighton's preferred location for a new stadium. This was finally completed in 2011, when the American Express Stadium was opened on a site four miles north-east of the city centre.
