= Hove Town Hall =

Municipal building in Hove, East Sussex, England

Coordinates: 50.8283°N 0.1704°W

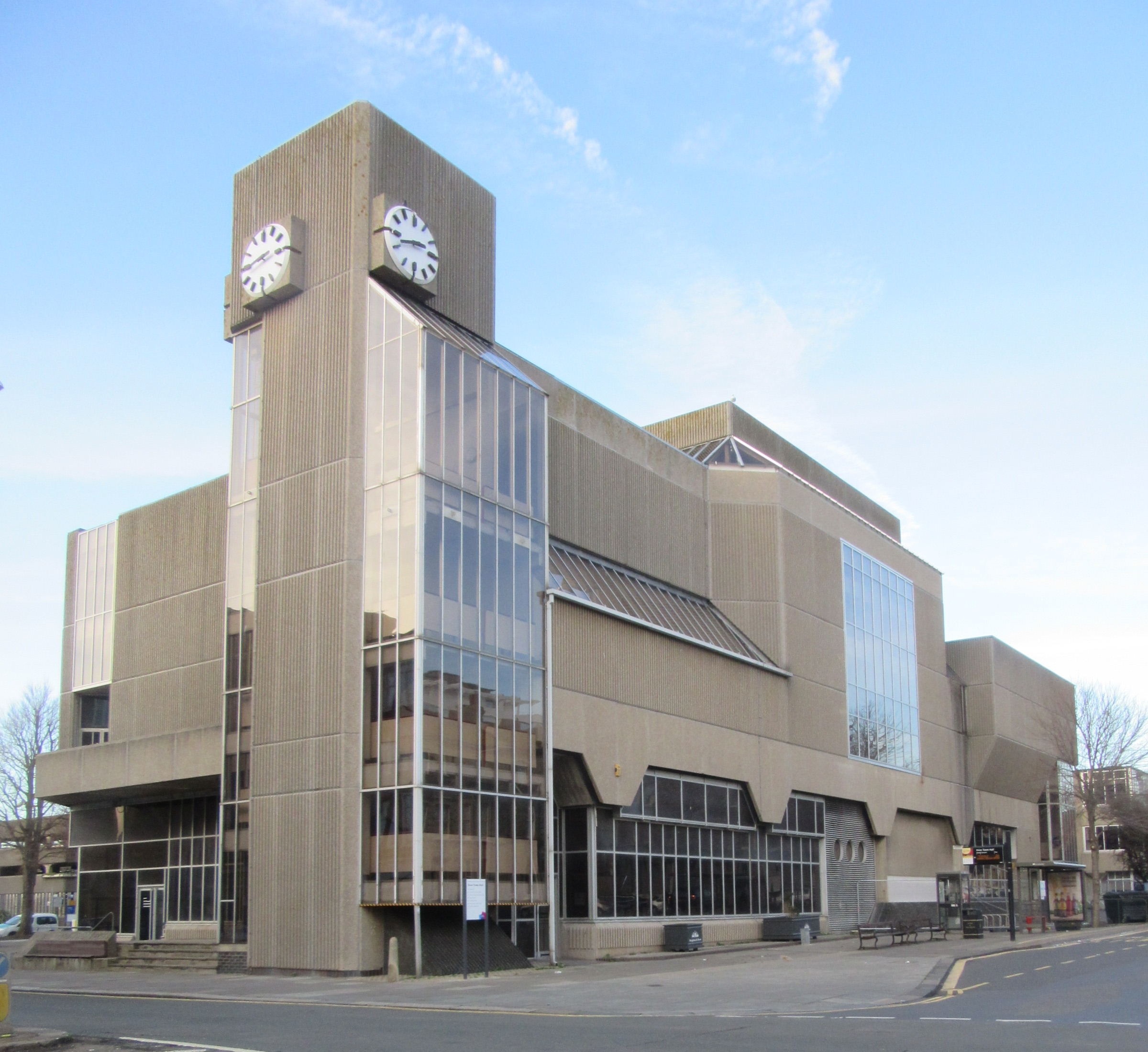
- The new Hove Town Hall including clock face in 2016
- Interactive map of the Hove Town Hall area

General information
- Type: Town hall
- Architectural style: Brutalist architecture
- Location: Hove, England, Town Hall; Norton Road, Hove, East Sussex, BN3 4AH
- Construction started: 1970
- Inaugurated: 1974

Design and construction
- Architect: John Wells-Thorpe

Other information
- Public transit access: Bus: Routes 1, 1A, N1, 2, 5, 5A, 5B, N5, 6, 25, 46, 49, 60, 71, 71A, 93, 95, 96

Hove Town Hall is the headquarters of Brighton and Hove City Council. The current building was constructed in 1970 in the Brutalist style by John Wells-Thorpe, to replace the original 1882 Hall which was damaged by fire in 1966.

== Original town hall building ==
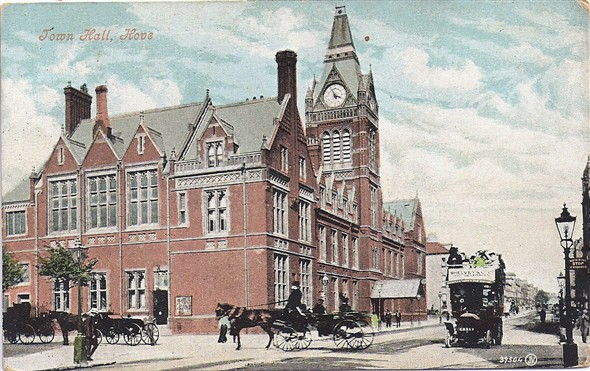
The original Hove Town Hall building

The original town hall in Hove was built by Alfred Waterhouse and opened in 1882. It was built in the gothic style, out of red brick, terracotta and Portland stone, and contained a 2,000 capacity great hall with three balconies, and a 110 feet (34 m) tall tower in the central facade. The building cost around £50,000. The organ was built by Henry Willis, and was sold in 1959. The tower contained a clock and carillon of 12 bells by Gillett, Bland & Co.; their combined weight made them the heaviest bells in Southern England in the late 19th century.

In 1900, the building was used as a part-time cinema by James Williamson, and in 1907, the town hall hosted a Women's Social and Political Union meeting at which Louisa Martindale spoke. During the First World War, Hove Town Hall was used as a recruitment office, and hosted events for Belgian soldiers and the Belgian royal family.

On 9 January 1966, the town hall was damaged by a fire, which destroyed the Great Hall, Council Chamber, offices and the Magistrates' Court. During the fire, the mayor's secretary John Barter went into the building to retrieve the regalia. After the fire, the civic offices were moved to Brooker Hall, whilst the magistrates' court and court offices moved to the western part of the building, which had not been damaged by the fire. The courts eventually moved to the Hove Trial Centre in 1972.

== Current town hall building ==
In October 1968, planning permission was granted for the construction of a new town hall in Hove. The new town hall was built by John Wells-Thorpe in the Brutalist architecture style, predominantly out of concrete clad. Construction began in 1970, and the town hall was officially opened by Lord Rupert Nevill on 5 March 1974. The building contained a faceted wooden ceiling in the great hall and a concrete entrance with four hexagonal columns.

In 1991, the building was extended, adding a Registrar's Office, Citizens Advice Bureau and Tourist information centre, and in 1994, a yellow Royal Mail postbox donated by Draveil, a town twinned with Hove, was placed in front of the town hall. In 2014, a proposal was submitted for replacing the glass with green double-glazed glass and extending the entrance; separately, a request to English Heritage for the building to become a listed building, as one of the only pieces of post-war architecture in Brighton and Hove was denied. In 2015, the town hall suffered a fire believed to have been caused by an electrical fault in the roof's solar panels; the black smoke from the fire was visible throughout Brighton and Hove.
