= King Alfred Leisure Centre =

Leisure centre in Hove, England

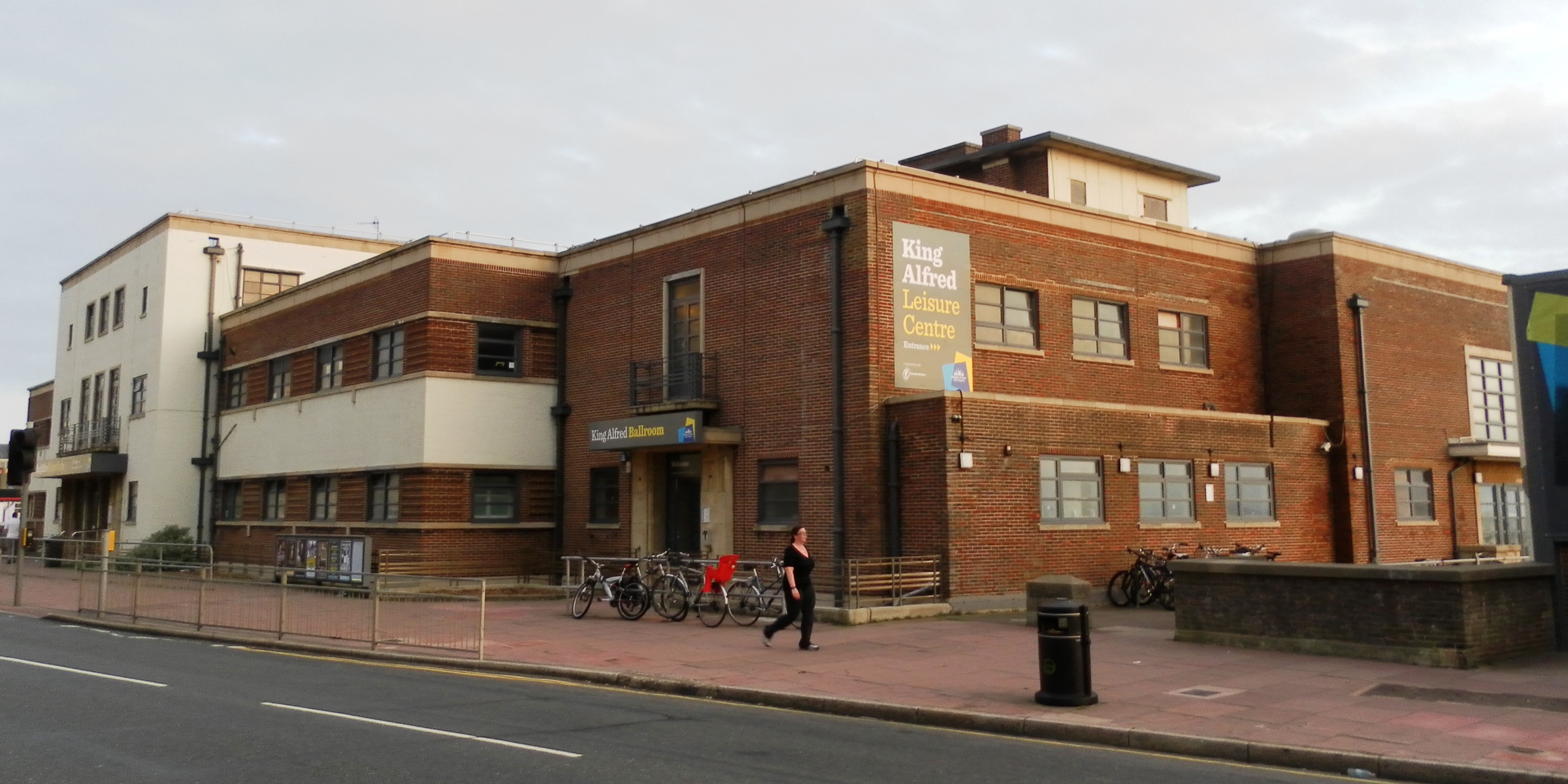
- The leisure centre in 2011
- Interactive map of King Alfred Leisure Centre
- Location: Hove, Brighton and Hove, England
- Coordinates: 50.8251°N 0.1789°W
- Owner: Brighton and Hove City Council
- Operator: Freedom Leisure

Construction
- Built: 1939

Website
- Official website

The King Alfred Leisure Centre is a leisure centre on Hove seafront in the city of Brighton and Hove in England. The complex, which includes a ballroom, sports halls and swimming pools, is owned by Brighton and Hove City Council and operated by Freedom Leisure.

== Facilities ==
The wetside facilities include a 25 m (82 ft) 6-lane swimming pool which ranges from a depth of 1.2–2.5 m (3 ft 11 in – 8 ft 2 in). This pool is used by Shiverers Swimming Club for training. There is also a lagoon area with a large slide for over 8s. There was once a smaller slide for under 8s which was removed and replaced with other play activities. A teaching pool (depth 0.9–1.2 m (2 ft 11 in – 3 ft 11 in)) is also used for swimming lessons which follow a syllabus designed by the ASA. The swimming pool building has bays fronting the esplanade and a distinctive curved roof form.

Full wetside changing facilities are available including individual cubicles, family cubicles, group changing rooms and disabled changing room (which uses the RADAR key scheme). There are also lockers which take £1 coins.

The King Alfred Leisure Centre also has a relatively small gym with a variety of machines and free weights and the larger Cheetahs gym which is not managed by Brighton and Hove City Council.

A therapy room is based in the old entrance hall called purple turtle which offers a wide variety of treatments.

There are two sports halls based in the old pool halls. The main sports hall is used for sports such as badminton, football, basketball, roller hockey and trampolining whilst the small one is used for mini mayhem sessions (a soft play session), martial arts, table tennis and sessions such as aerobics.

The King Alfred Leisure Centre also has a ballroom which hosts a wide variety of events such as meetings, exams and live music, most notably is a performance by Nick Cave on 2 July 2008.

There is also an indoor bowls club on the east side of the building (in what was once a car park) and 'multiplay' facilities to the west which have netball and tennis courts. The centre has car parking facilities on the west side above a ten pin bowling rink and a laser tag centre, both of which have been left abandoned.

There is also a cafe which opened in 2008, replacing the long serving 'Splash Cafe' which closed due to the proposed redevelopment.

== Pool users ==
As well as public sessions, the pools are also used by many clubs including Shiverers Swimming Club, Dolphins Disabled Swimming Club, Marlins Disabled Swimming Club, Brighton Lifesaving Club, and a freediving club. The pool is also used by Brighton Swimming Teachers Centre. Until 2007, the offices of Brighton Swimming Teachers Centre were based in the offices on the north side of the building, along with the Brighton Transport offices, however both parties left in 2007 due to the proposed redevelopment, which has since been postponed.

The pool was also used twice by David Walliams during his training for his channel crossing.

== History ==
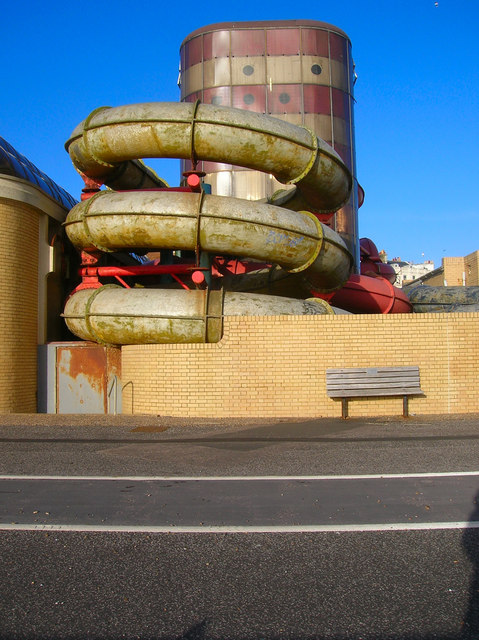
Water Slides (now demolished) on the east side of The King Alfred Leisure Centre

The purpose-built leisure facility Hove Marina was ready to be opened to the public when war was declared on 3 September 1939. The swimming pools were filled with filtered seawater. The facility was almost immediately commandeered by the Royal Navy for the training of RNVR officers and was commissioned as HMS King Alfred. After the war, and with permission from the Admiralty, it officially adopted the name by which it is now known. The seawater pool was decommissioned in 1977 and reopened in 1980 using fresh water after a £4 million redevelopment.

The east side of the building used to house three water slides (flumes) that fed into a plunge pool; opened in August 1986, the fastest was called The Black Hole, followed by the red Aqua-jet, with the yellow Twister for beginners. However, by November 2000 the slides were closed indefinitely due to health and safety concerns before ultimately being removed in 2009. The leisure centre used to have an ice rink.

=== Redevelopment ===
Due to the building's age redevelopment had been proposed for many years before plans by Frank Gehry were accepted in 2003. These £290 million plans included a new sports centre two twenty-storey towers containing 750 flats. Previous plans for taller towers were scaled back to twenty storeys in 2005 following public outcry. The plans ended up being dropped by the council after the 2008 financial crisis.

New plans for the centre's redevelopment by Haworth Tompkins were selected in 2016, containing 560 flats and 'world-class leisure and community facilities'. These plans were later scrapped in 2019 by developer Crest Nicholson, who cited 'uncertain times'.

In 2024 plans to demolish the leisure centre and replace it with a new £47 million complex were approved, scheduled to be completed in 2028.
