= Hove Park =

Park and electoral ward in Brighton and Hove, England

Coordinates: 50°50′35.53″N 0°10′18.06″W

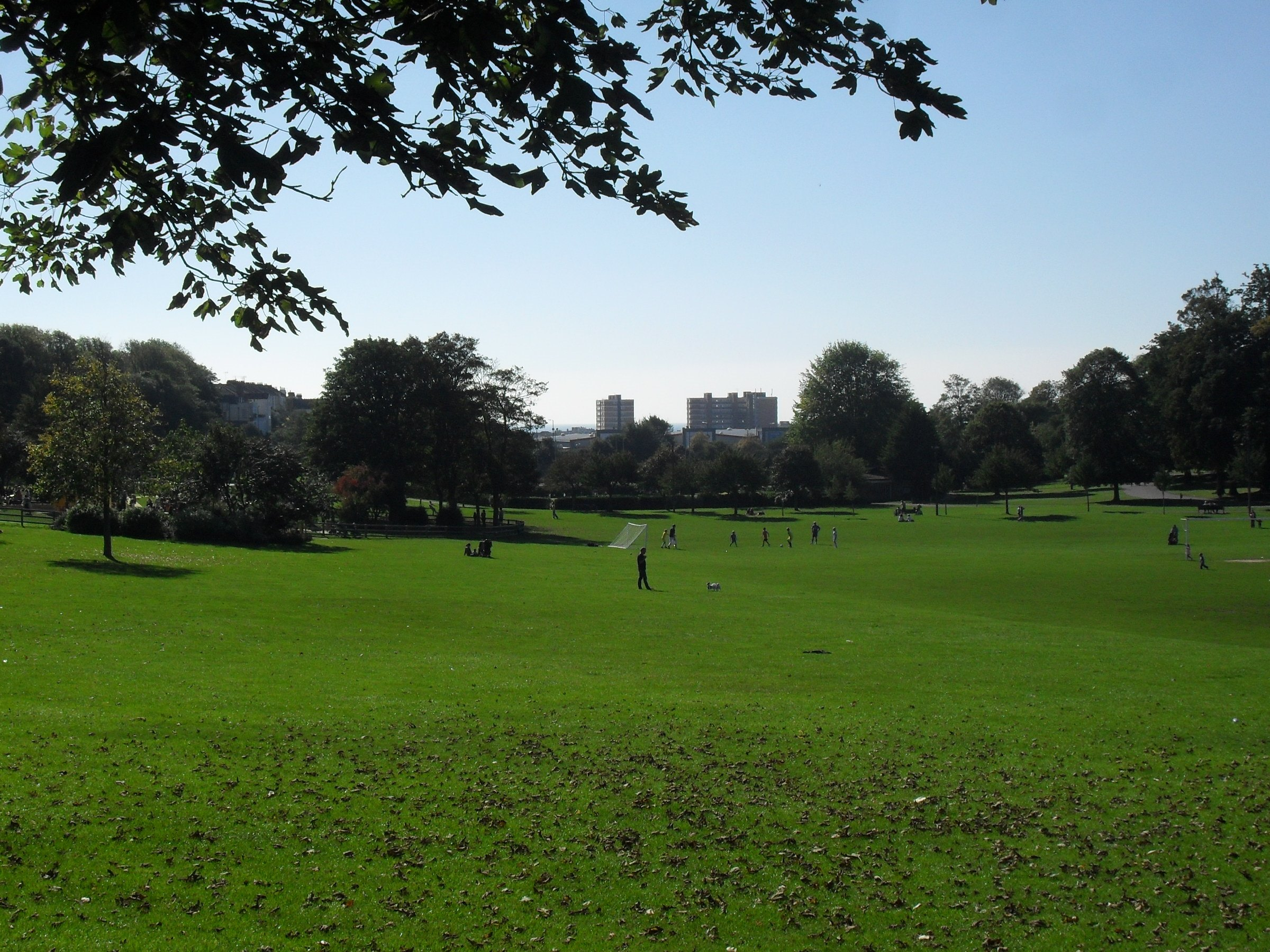
- Interactive map of Hove Park
- Type: Public Park
- Location: Hove, England
- Area: 40 acres (16 ha)
- Operator: Brighton & Hove City Council
- Open: 24 hours
- Status: Open year round

Hove Park is a park within the English city of Brighton & Hove. It is also the name of an electoral ward in Brighton and Hove whose population at the 2011 census was 10,602.

== Overview ==
A paved path goes all round the park, approximately 1.17 miles (1.89 km) in length, and is often used by walkers and runners. There are also several paved paths cross-secting the park at various points. Brighton & Hove Albion's traditional home, the Goldstone Ground was opposite the park, until it was demolished.

Facilities include a fenced off playground, a football pitch, a basketball court, a climbing boulder and several tennis courts. The park's bowling green is no longer in use. The club pavilion and bowling green has been leased to local health & fitness club Riptide by Brighton and Hove City Council. A cafe operates throughout the year and serves refreshments. Public toilets are located near the cafe.

In the southwest corner lies a rock called The Goldstone. Legend has it that the devil threw the approximately 20 ton rock there while excavating Devil's Dyke. Towards the north is a sculpture by the environmental artist Chris Drury; Fingermaze is a labyrinth-like design based on a fingerprint, consisting of stones set into the turf.

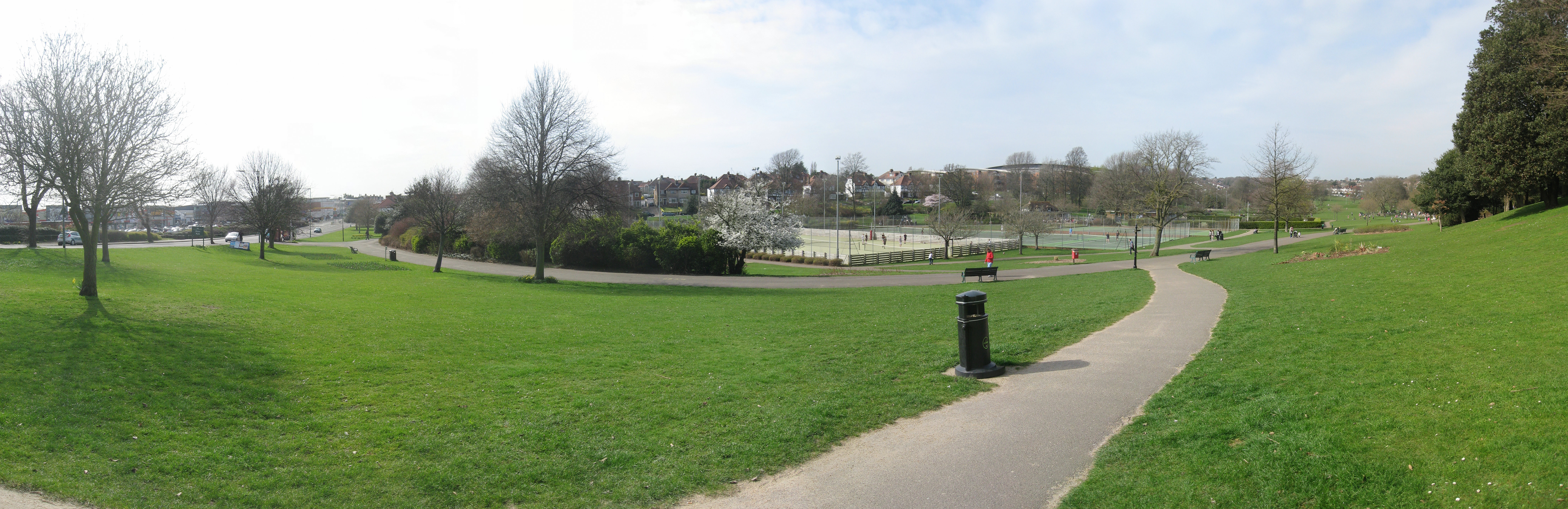
Panoramic view of Hove Park from South East corner

Hove Park is home to the Brighton Parkrun.

== Miniature steam railway ==
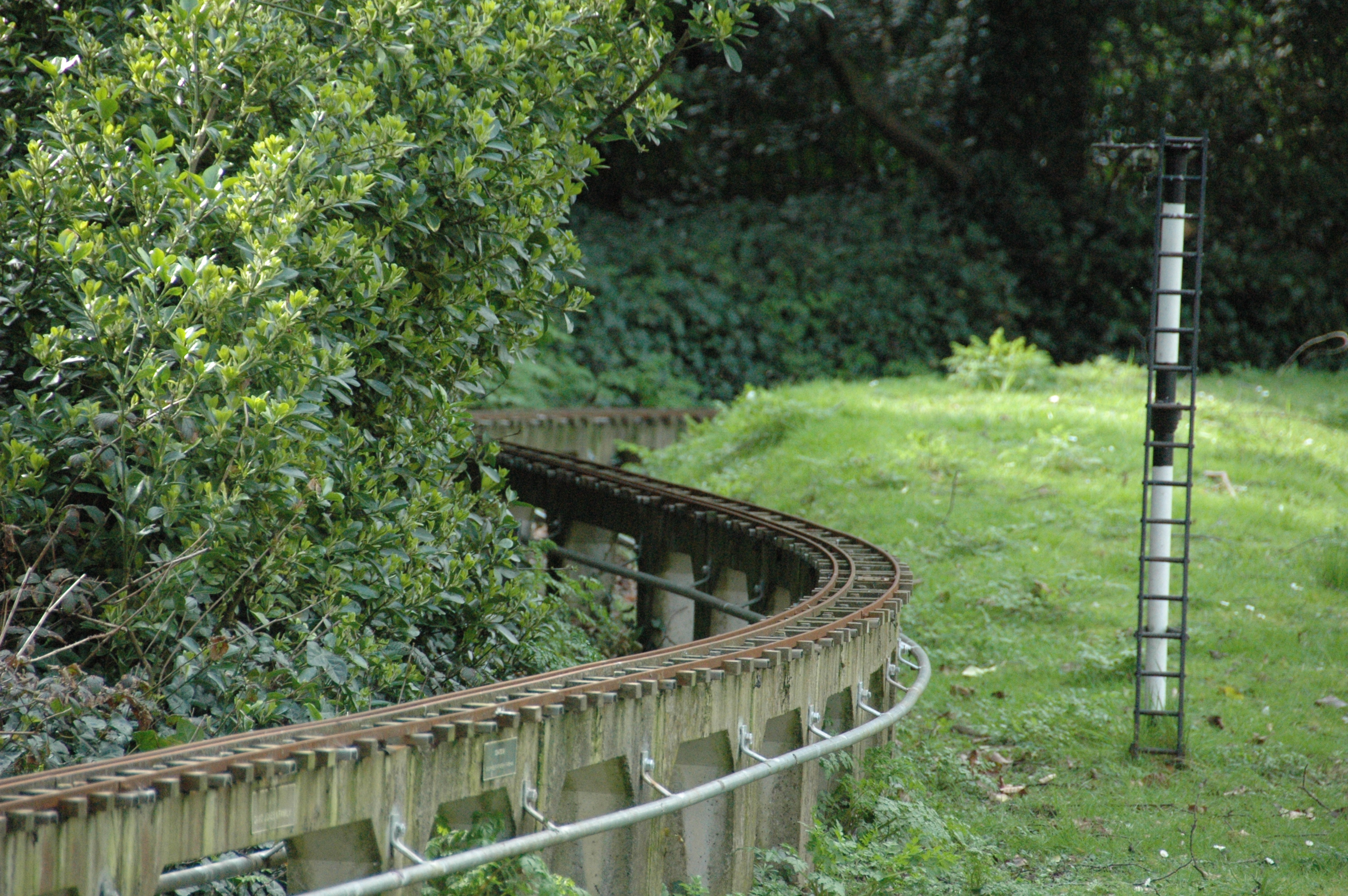
Miniature Steam Railway track

The park includes a 2,000-foot (610 m) long miniature railway operating on a 3.5 and 5-inch gauge, which is open on occasional weekends and bank holidays throughout spring, summer and autumn. The railway is run by the Brighton & Hove Society of Miniature Locomotive Engineers, which was formed from part of Brighton Model Engineers in 1962.

The track was upgraded to use concrete sections following damage caused by the Great Storm of 1987. Each separate section bears a plate detailing the name of the individual who sponsored it.

== Sources ==
- Brighton & Hove Society of Miniature Locomotive Engineers
- Brighton & Hove City Council - Hove Park
