= John Wells-Thorpe =

English architect (1928–2019)

- Born: 1928; Brighton, East Sussex, England
- Died: 21 April 2019 (aged 90–91)
- Education: University of Brighton
- Occupation: Architect

John Arthur Wells-Thorpe OBE (1928–2019) was an English architect. He is best known for the breadth of his design capability in both the UK and numerous locations overseas.

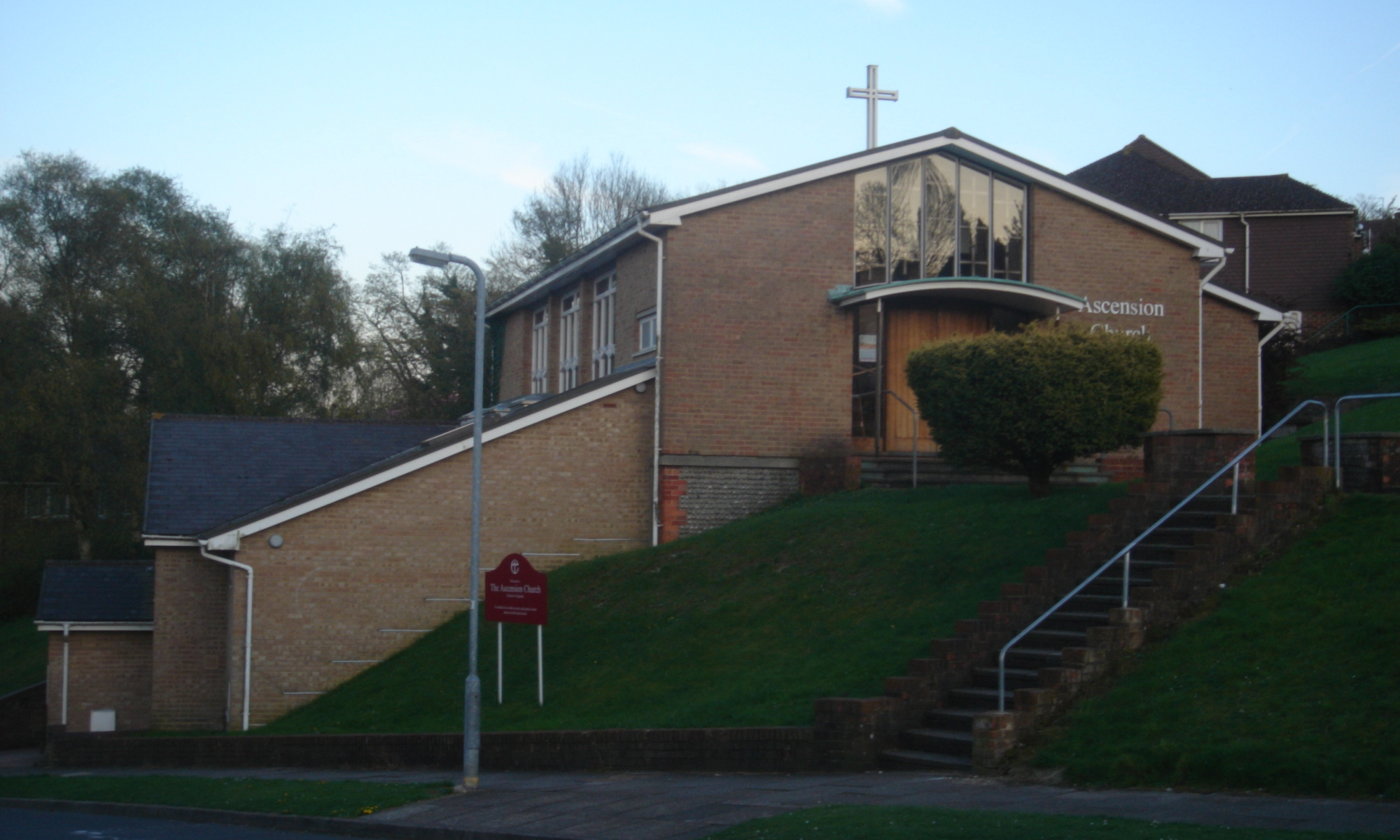
Church of the Ascension, Westdene, Brighton

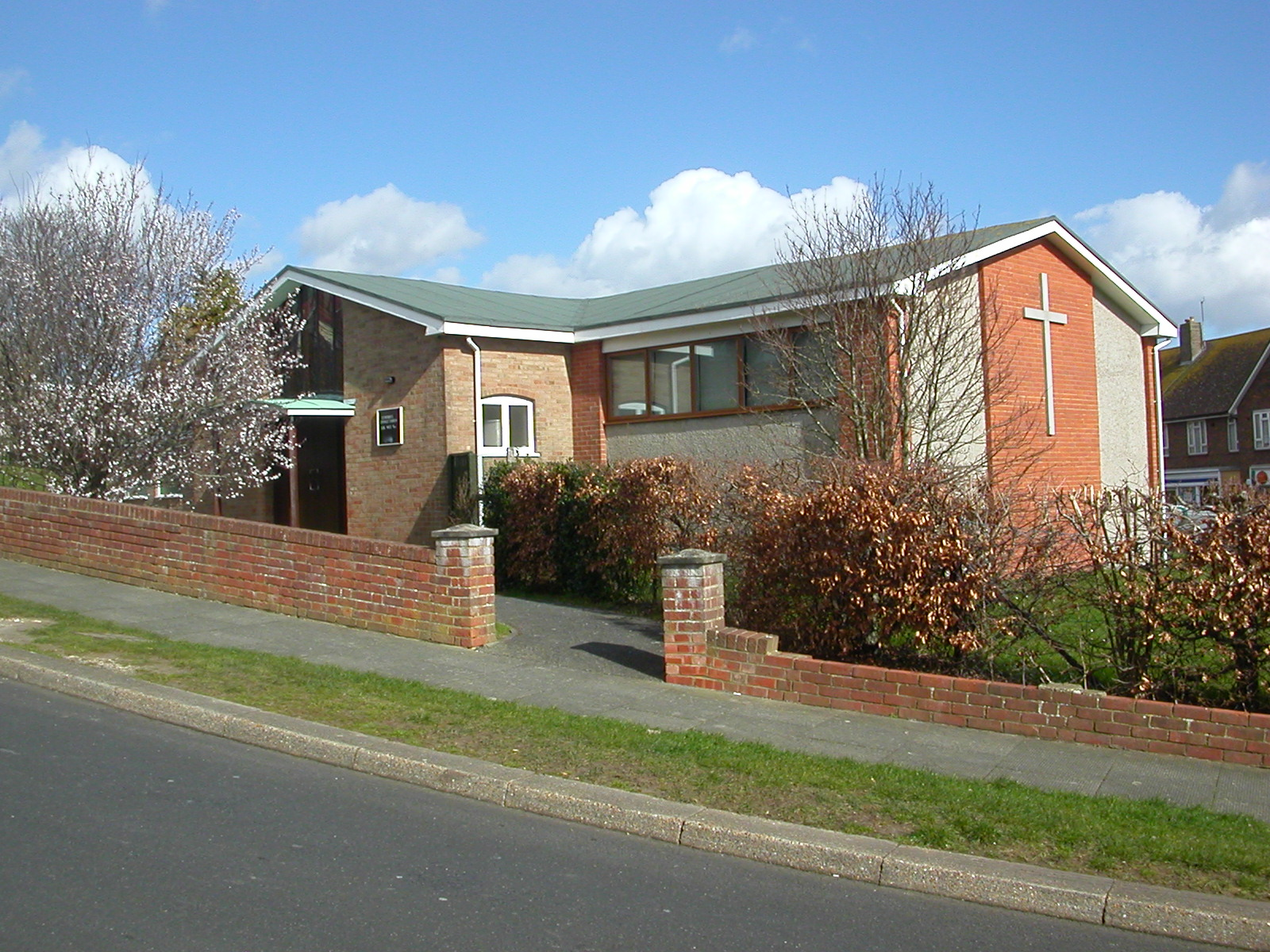
St Patrick's Roman Catholic Church, formerly known as the Church of the Resurrection, Woodingdean

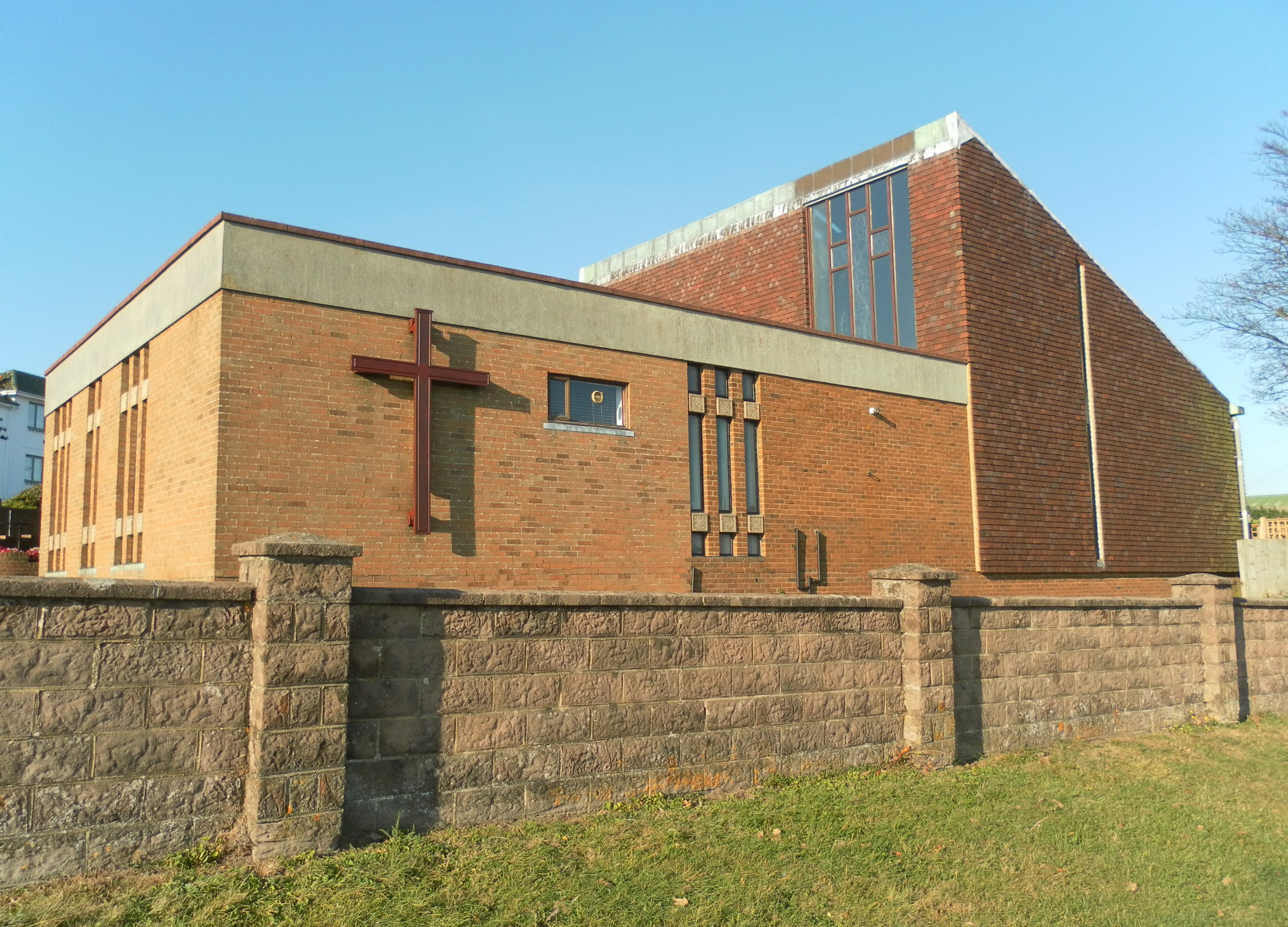
Holy Cross Church, Woodingdean

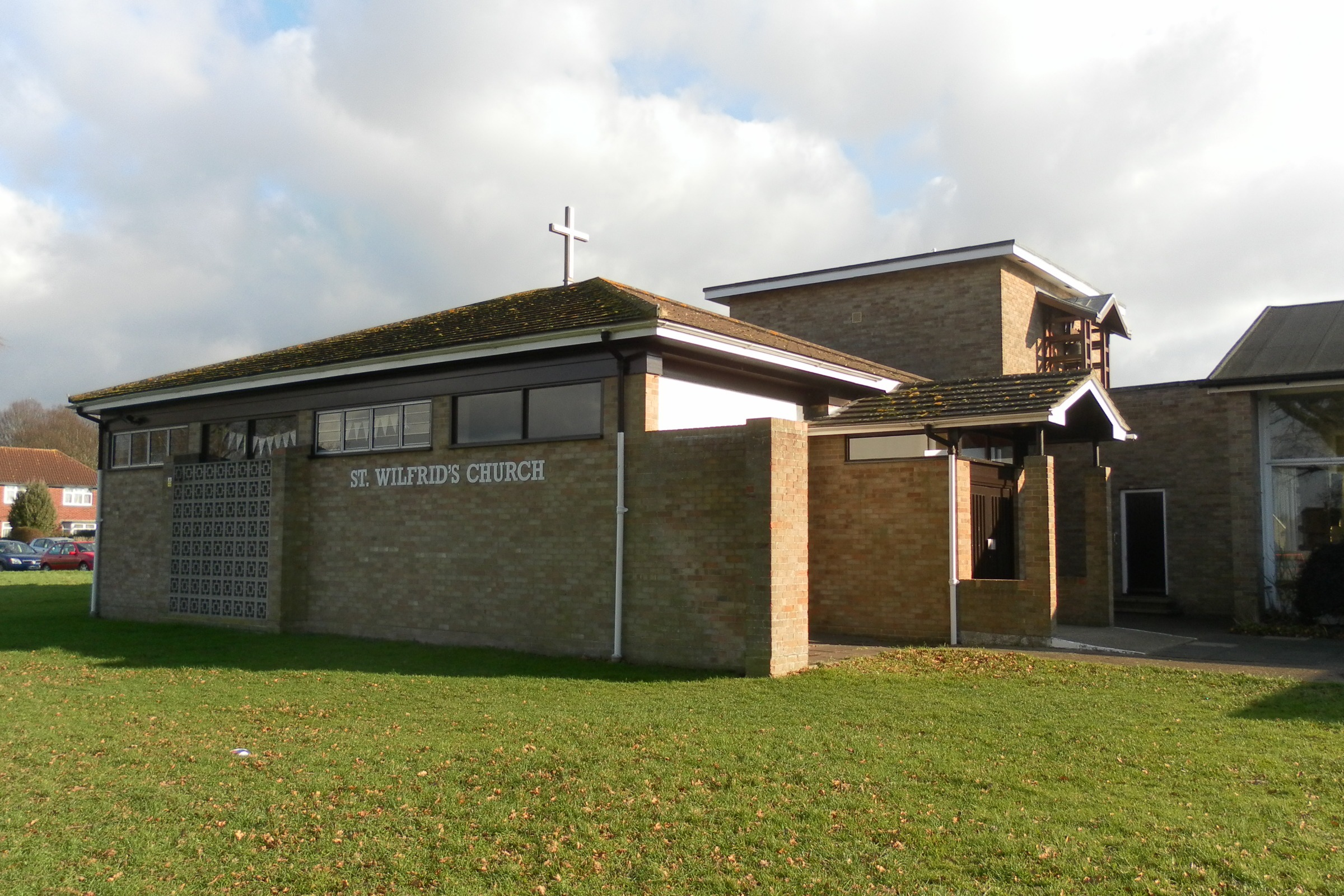
St Wilfrid's Church, Chichester

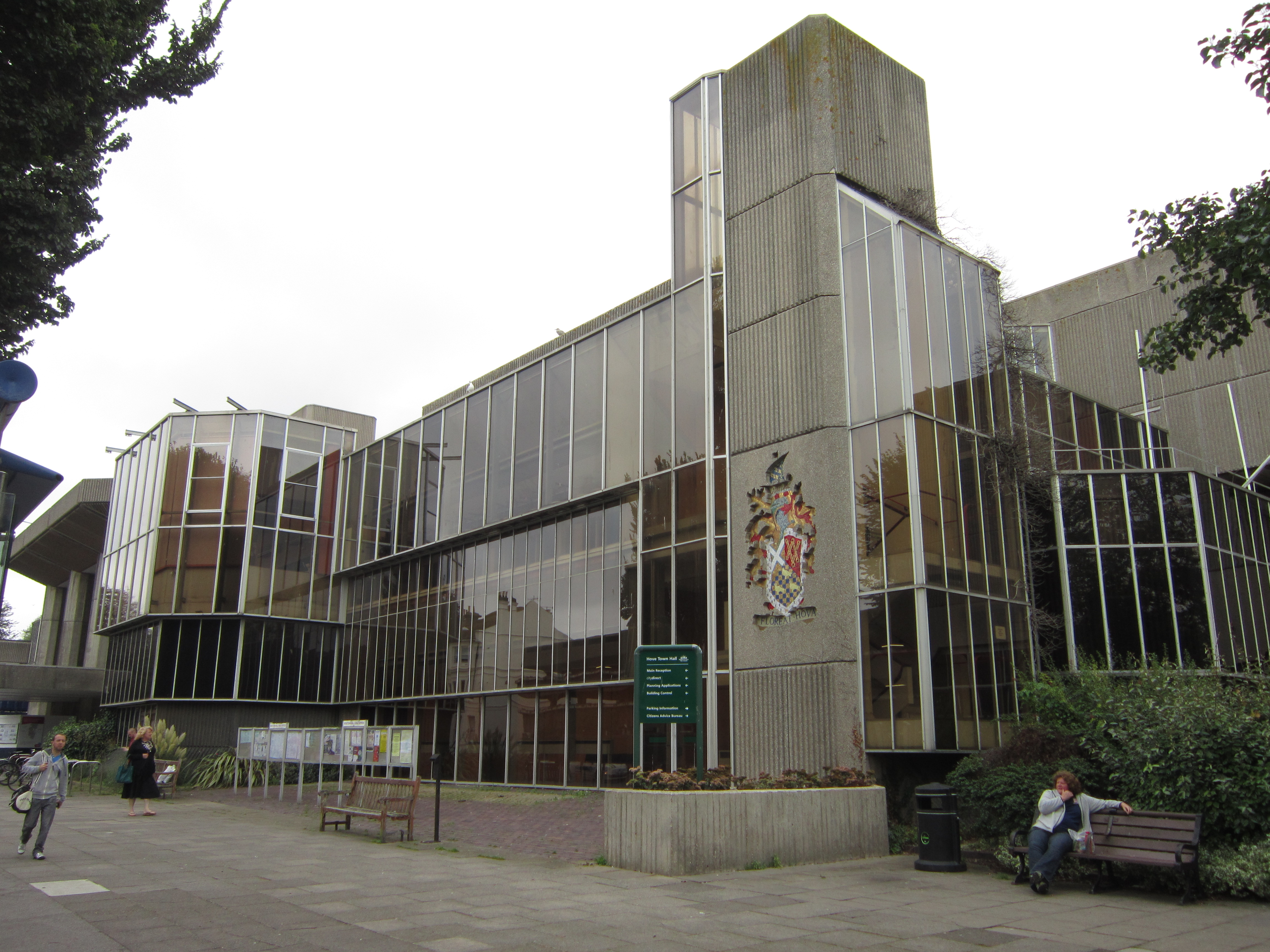
Hove Town Hall

== Biography ==
=== Early life ===
John Wells-Thorpe was born in 1928 in Brighton, East Sussex, England. He attended the Brighton, Hove and Sussex Grammar School. He graduated from the University of Brighton (then called the Brighton College of Art), followed by three international scholarships to Rome, Northern Italy and Moorish Spain.

=== Career ===
He designed the Church of the Ascension in Westdene, Brighton, in 1958. From 1958 to 1959 he designed the Church of the Resurrection, now known as St Patrick's Roman Catholic Church, in Woodingdean. In 1968, he designed the Holy Cross Church in Woodingdean. Five years later, in 1973, he added an extension to St Wilfrid's Church in Chichester. In 1974, he designed Hove Town Hall. He also designed a "relocatable church", a TV studio in the Arabian Desert, and financial headquarters next door to St Paul's Cathedral in London.

He served as vice-president of the Royal Institute of British Architects and president of the Commonwealth Association of Architects. He also served on the advisory board of the BBC. He was founding chair of South Downs Health NHS Trust.

In the 1995 New Year Honours he was appointed OBE for services to architecture.

He died on 21 April 2019 at the age of 90.

== Bibliography ==
- Manser, Jose: "The NHS's quality provider. (National Health Service; John Wells-Thorpe, chairman of South Downs Health Trust)" in EMAP Architecture, 1994.
- Wells-Thorpe, John, Cho Padamsee: Old buildings: new uses, London : Commonwealth Association of Architects, c1983. Includes slides, sound cassette and booklet.
- Wells-Thorpe, John: "The emerging aesthetic—accident or design?" in Landscape Research, pp. 19–22, vol 13, issue 2, 1988.
- Wells-Thorpe, John: 'Healing by Design: Feeling Better?', in The Healing Environment, eds. Deborah Kirklin, Ruth Richardson, London: Royal College of Physicians, 2003.
- Bryan Lawson, Michael Phiri and John Wells-Thorpe: The Architectural Healthcare Environment and its Effects on Patient Health Outcomes, NHS Estates, 2003.
- Wells-Thorpe, John: 'Behind The Facade: An Architect At Large': Book Guild Publishing, 2009. ISBN 9781846243752.
