= SWK =

SWK may refer to:

- Samakkhi Witthayakhom School, a high school in northern Thailand
- Scott Wilson Group's London Stock Exchange ticker symbol
- London Borough of Southwark's ISO geocode
- Stacy Witbeck, a railway construction company
- Stanley Black & Decker's New York Stock Exchange stock ticker symbol
- Star Wars Kid, an Internet phenomenon
- SWK MOBIL, a German transport operator
- Southwick railway station, a railway station in Sussex, England (station code: SWK)
- Say What? Karaoke, American karaoke game show
