= Portslade =

Suburb of Brighton and Hove, England

Coordinates: 50°50′38″N 0°12′58″W

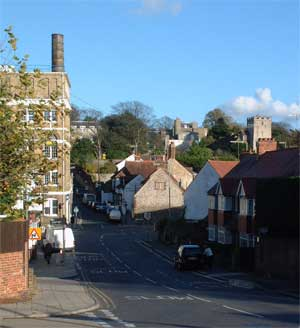
- Portslade Village

- Location within East Sussex
- OS grid reference: TQ255065
- Unitary authority: Brighton and Hove
- Ceremonial county: East Sussex
- Region: South East
- Country: England
- Sovereign state: United Kingdom
- Post town: Brighton
- Postcode district: BN41
- Dialling code: 01273
- Police: Sussex
- Fire: East Sussex
- Ambulance: South East Coast
- UK Parliament: Hove and Portslade

Portslade is a western suburb of the city of Brighton and Hove in the ceremonial county of East Sussex, England. Portslade Village, the original settlement a mile inland to the north, was built up in the 16th century. The arrival of the railway from Brighton in 1840 encouraged rapid development of the coastal area and in 1898 the southern part, formerly known as Copperas Gap, was granted urban district status and renamed Portslade-by-Sea, making it distinct from Portslade Village. After World War II the district of Mile Oak to the north was added. Today, Portslade is bisected from east to west by the old A27 road (now the A270) between Brighton and Worthing, each part having a distinct character.

== Geography ==
Portslade Village, to the north, nestles in a valley of the South Downs and still retains its rural character with flint buildings, a village green and the small parish church of St Nicolas, which is the second-oldest church in the city, dating from approximately 1150.

Portslade-by-Sea, to the south, has both the small but busy seaport harbour basin of Shoreham harbour and the industrial centre of Brighton and Hove. The east arm of Shoreham Canal Port, which includes the north and south basin quays, separates the pebble beach from the town centre. Terraced housing dating back to the 19th century is interspaced with parks and allotments. The main shopping area is on Station Road. Portslade station, actually on Boundary Road in neighbouring Hove, has direct trains to London Victoria with a journey time of just over an hour.

The adjacent areas of West Sussex are Southwick and Fishersgate, with Fishersgate being south of the railway line. Fishersgate has its own railway station.

A notable building in the village is Portslade Manor, one of the few surviving ruins of a Norman manor. It was built in the 12th century and is now a Scheduled Ancient Monument. Foredown Tower houses a camera obscura, one of only two in the south of England. It is open to the public.

=== Portslade downland ===
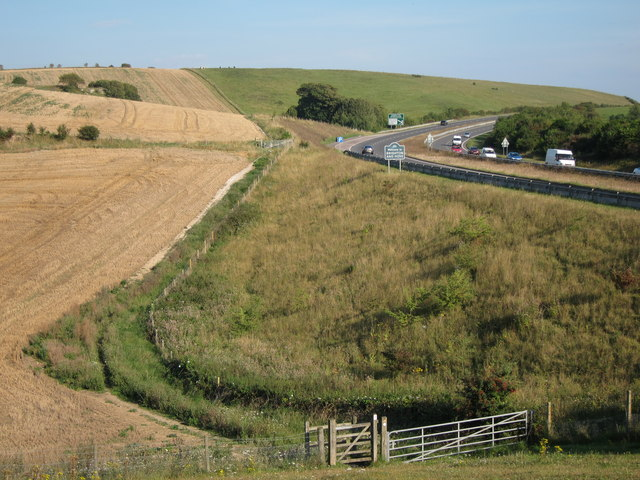
Cockroost Bottom

To the north is Mile Oak and the A27 road which separates the built-up area from a number of special downland areas, which include Cockroost Hill to the northwest, Mount Zion to the northeast and Cockroost Bottom separating the two.

The name, Cockroost, may have come from the population of great bustard that used to inhabit the area. Although there are no longer bustards here, there is remarkable wildlife, including the rare moth Sitochroa palealis, orchids and butterflies. There is also a lot of history to be found on these slopes including a large 4000 year old Bronze Age settlement, which may have been a henge (as in Stonehenge), as well as evidence of Iron Age and Romano-British farming activity.

Mount Zion's east slopes, north of New Barn Farm, are just as special. They have always been grazed and there are three coombes dotted with old anthills and orchids including the rare bee orchid. The most northerly coombe has the little copse with hazel and dogwood. Goldfinches, linnets and migrant birds on passage enjoy its peace.

There are two notable pathways on this downland. One is the Mid Sussex Path of the Sussex Border Path which separates East and West Sussex and runs north into the Fulking parish. There is also the final stretch of the Monarch's Way which passes through Mile Oak and Portslade and follows the seafront west towards Shoreham. The Way is a 625-mile (1,006 km) long-distance footpath that runs from Worcester to Shoreham.

== History ==
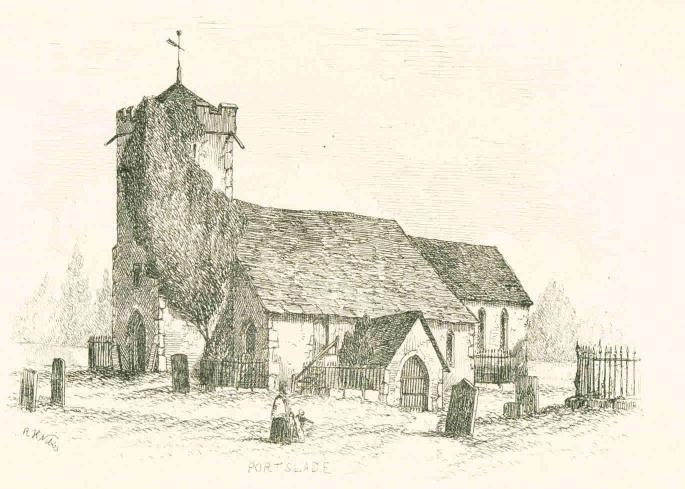
St Nicolas's in 1851

Portslade has been suggested as being the Roman port Novus Portus mentioned in Ptolemy's Geography of the 2nd century AD. Drove Road, in the original Portslade Village, has been linked with the Roman road (sometimes known as the "London to Portslade Way") that passes through Patcham valley to Haywards Heath and on to Streatham in London. The Old Shoreham Road is thought to form part of the Chichester (Noviomagus Reginorum) to Portslade Roman road. Roman remains and a Roman burial site were found in Roman Road. The name of the town had been thought to stem from the Roman placename Portus Adurni, but this is based on a misidentification of Shoreham-by-Sea as Portus Adurni by Michael Drayton in the 17th century. Indeed, the River Adur, whose mouth has moved many times due to longshore drift and erosion, was also named from this misidentification. The actual etymology of Portslade may be portus- + -ladda, way to the port, where ladda is from the Old English for way, but this is conjectural at best.

Portslade was listed in Domesday Book of 1086 as having two households, and was under the tenancy of William of Warenne, having a value of six shillings.

The old name, Copperas Gap, for Portslade-by-Sea suggests that the coast was used for the production of copperas or green vitriol, a form of ferrous sulfate used extensively in the textile industry. The process took over six years and made use of iron pyrite-rich nodules that could be found in the strata of Sussex greensand stone that emerges at this point in the coast.

A part-finished assembly hall in Portslade became an Odeon Cinema about 1930 when George Coles, one of the Odeon chain's principal architects, adapted the original design.

=== 19th-century residents ===
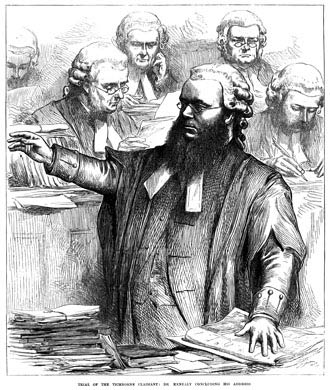
Edward Kenealy at the Tichborne trial

Revd Richard William Enraght (1837–1898) was the Priest in Charge of St Andrew Church, Portslade, from 1871 to 1874. Fr. Enraght's belief in the Church of England's Catholic tradition, his promotion of ritualism in worship, and his writings on Catholic worship and church-state relationships led him into conflict with the Public Worship Regulation Act 1874. While serving as Vicar of Holy Trinity, Bordesley, Birmingham in 1880, he paid the maximum price under the Act of prosecution and imprisonment in Warwick Prison. Fr. Enraght became nationally and internationally known as a "prisoner for conscience sake". In September 2006, Brighton & Hove bus company honoured Fr. Enraght's memory by naming one of their new buses after him.

Edward Vaughan Hyde Kenealy QC (1819–1880) was an Irish born barrister, writer and poet who lived in Wellington Road, Portslade with his wife and eleven children from the 1850s until the mid-1870s. Kenealy commuted to London and Oxford for his law practice but returned at weekends and other times to be with his family. He chose Portslade because of his love of the sea, of which he wrote: "Oh, how I am delighted with this sea-scenery and with my little marine hut ! The musical waves, the ethereal atmosphere, all make me feel as in the olden golden days when I was a boy and dreamed of Heaven". While living in Portslade he wrote the greater portion of his theological works.

=== Administrative history ===
Portslade was an ancient parish. In 1898 the parish was split into two; the more built-up southern part near the coast became an urban district and parish called "Portslade-by-Sea", leaving a smaller northern parish covering the more rural areas and the old village, which kept the name Portslade. In 1921 the (northern) parish of Portslade had a population of 523. That Portslade parish was abolished in 1928 and added to the parish and urban district of Portslade-by-Sea.

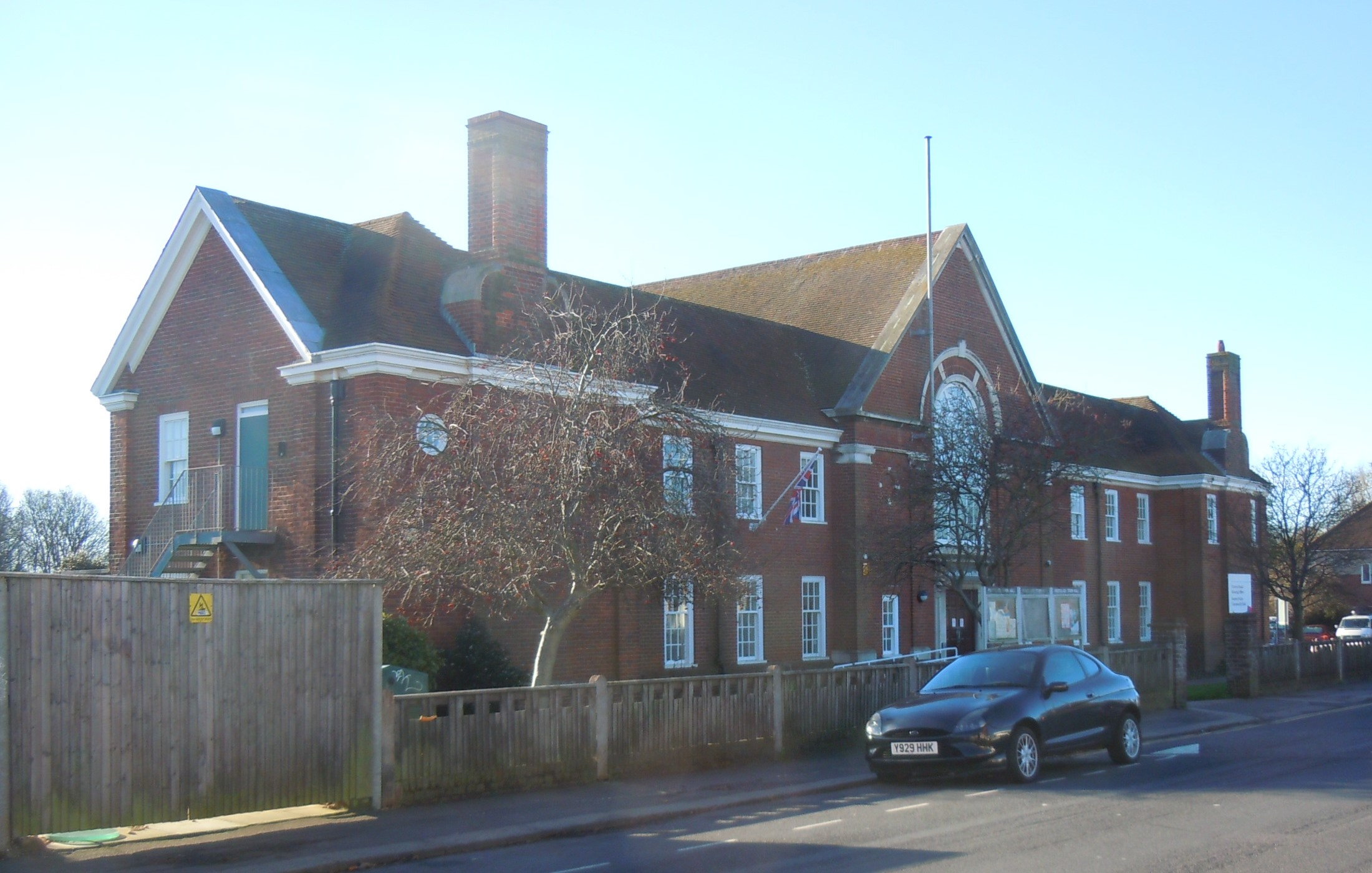
Portslade Town Hall, Victoria Road

Portslade-by-Sea Urban District Council acquired Ronuk Hall on Victoria Road in 1959 to serve as its headquarters and as a community hall; it is now a locally listed building.

The urban district of Portslade-by-Sea was abolished in 1974, being absorbed into the borough of Hove. No successor parish was created for the area and so Portslade was directly administered by Hove Borough Council. The borough of Hove merged with neighbouring Brighton in 1997 to become the unitary authority of Brighton and Hove, which was awarded city status in 2000. Brighton and Hove City Council is therefore the only local authority which covers Portslade today.

== Amenities ==
=== Education ===
Portslade encompasses Portslade Aldridge Community Academy.

=== Rail transport ===
Portslade railway station is located on the West Coastway Line west of Aldrington and east of Fishersgate, Southwick and Shoreham-by-Sea.
