= Mile Oak =

Area of Brighton and Hove, England

Coordinates: 50.855°N 0.233°W

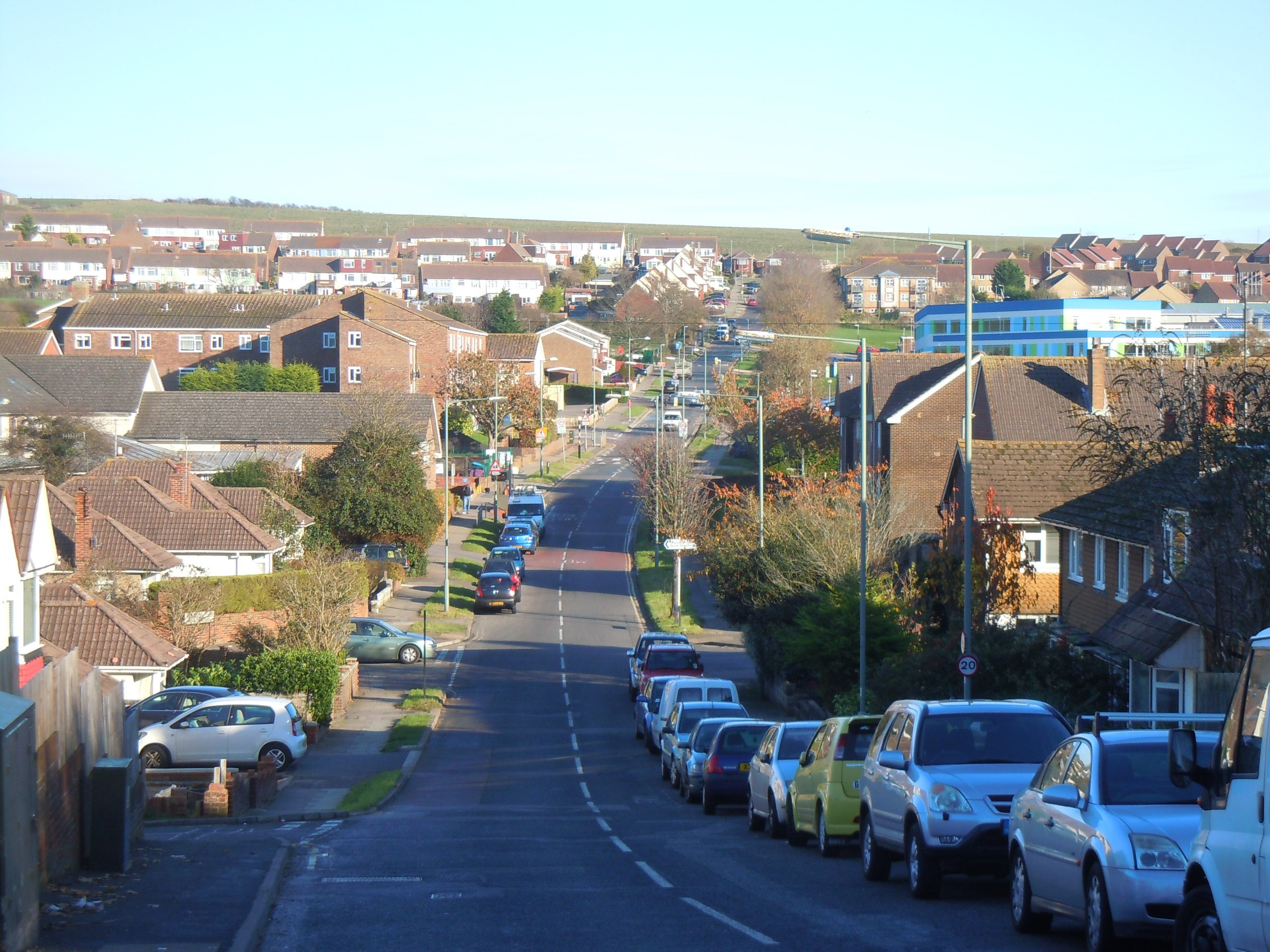
- Eastward view along Chalky Road, Mile Oak, with the South Downs in the background

- Location within East Sussex
- Population: c. 10,300
- OS grid reference: TQ255065
- Unitary authority: Brighton and Hove
- Ceremonial county: East Sussex
- Region: South East
- Country: England
- Sovereign state: United Kingdom
- Post town: Brighton
- Postcode district: BN41
- Dialling code: 01273
- Police: Sussex
- Fire: East Sussex
- Ambulance: South East Coast
- UK Parliament: Hove and Portslade

Mile Oak is a locality forming the northern part of the former parish of Portslade in the northwest corner of the city of Brighton and Hove, England. Now mostly residential, but originally an area of good-quality agricultural land, it covers the area north of Portslade village as far as the urban boundary.

Mile Oak is on the edge of the South Downs and as such has much farmland nearby; the Monarch's Way and Sussex Border Path long-distance footpaths skirt the edge of the built-up area. The first urban development occurred in the 1930s, and growth continued throughout the postwar era; houses were provided by the council, private builders and housing associations, many of them provided for people occupying substandard houses in the southern part of Portslade.

The Portslade Aldridge Community Academy is located at Chalky Road and houses a public library, although Brighton and Hove City Council announced in June 2023 that it would close the following month. Other local amenities include The Mile Oak Inn public house, the Anglican Church of the Good Shepherd and Mile Oak Farm.

== History ==
The location of the oak tree to which the name "Mile Oak" refers is not known for certain, but researchers have suggested two sites. In 1935, a contributor to the Sussex County Magazine described "an old oak that stood on the roadway until about 30 years ago, when it gradually rotted away ... it was on the west side of the road, about a mile [north of] the old George Inn on [Portslade] High Street". Alternatively, it may have been at Mile Oak Farm further north. Mile Oak, also spelt Mileoak in early documents, was first mentioned on a tithe map of 1840; and the Ordnance Survey map of 1873 identified Mileoak Cottages and Mileoak Barn on the road (now Mile Oak Road) leading north from Portslade village to the South Downs. Two families were recorded as living in Mile Oak in the 1881 census. They were agricultural workers; the main farm in the area was Mile Oak Farm, which covered 294 acres (119 ha).

Brighton Corporation bought Mile Oak Farm on 2 January 1890 with the intention of building a waterworks and pumping station there. This was completed in 1900 to the design of James Johnston, who also designed two adjacent cottages for waterworks employees (these are now locally listed buildings). The Corporation intended that the surrounding land should remain undeveloped to preserve the purity of the water. Also in 1900, a rifle range was opened to replace an earlier facility in east Brighton. It was used by the 1st Volunteer Battalion of the Royal Sussex Regiment. It was in an isolated position north of Mile Oak Farm on the slopes of the South Downs; this seclusion made it an ideal location. The facility was set to be closed in September 1934, but it was used throughout World War II. No trace of it remains.

Apart from a terrace of four houses on Mile Oak Road which date from the early 20th century and which are locally listed, development of the area now known as Mile Oak began in the 1930s and was piecemeal. Portslade Council established a girls' school and built some council housing; private housing development also took place; and some people informally occupied land along Mile Oak Road and claimed squatters' rights. A central focus to the Mile Oak area developed when Chalky Road was built up with private and housing association houses, shops and community buildings after World War II: until that time it was merely a chalk-covered cart track. East Sussex County Council built Portslade Senior Girls School, the predecessor of Portslade Community College, and a clinic and doctors' surgery in 1960. Mile Oak Gospel Hall followed in 1966. Housebuilding then continued until the end of the 20th century, both on the land originally acquired by Brighton Corporation and on parcels of land in other ownership, and urban development is now continuous north of Portslade village to the South Downs. Mile Oak Farm is still council-owned, and the remaining land and managed by tenant farmers.

== Notable buildings and areas ==
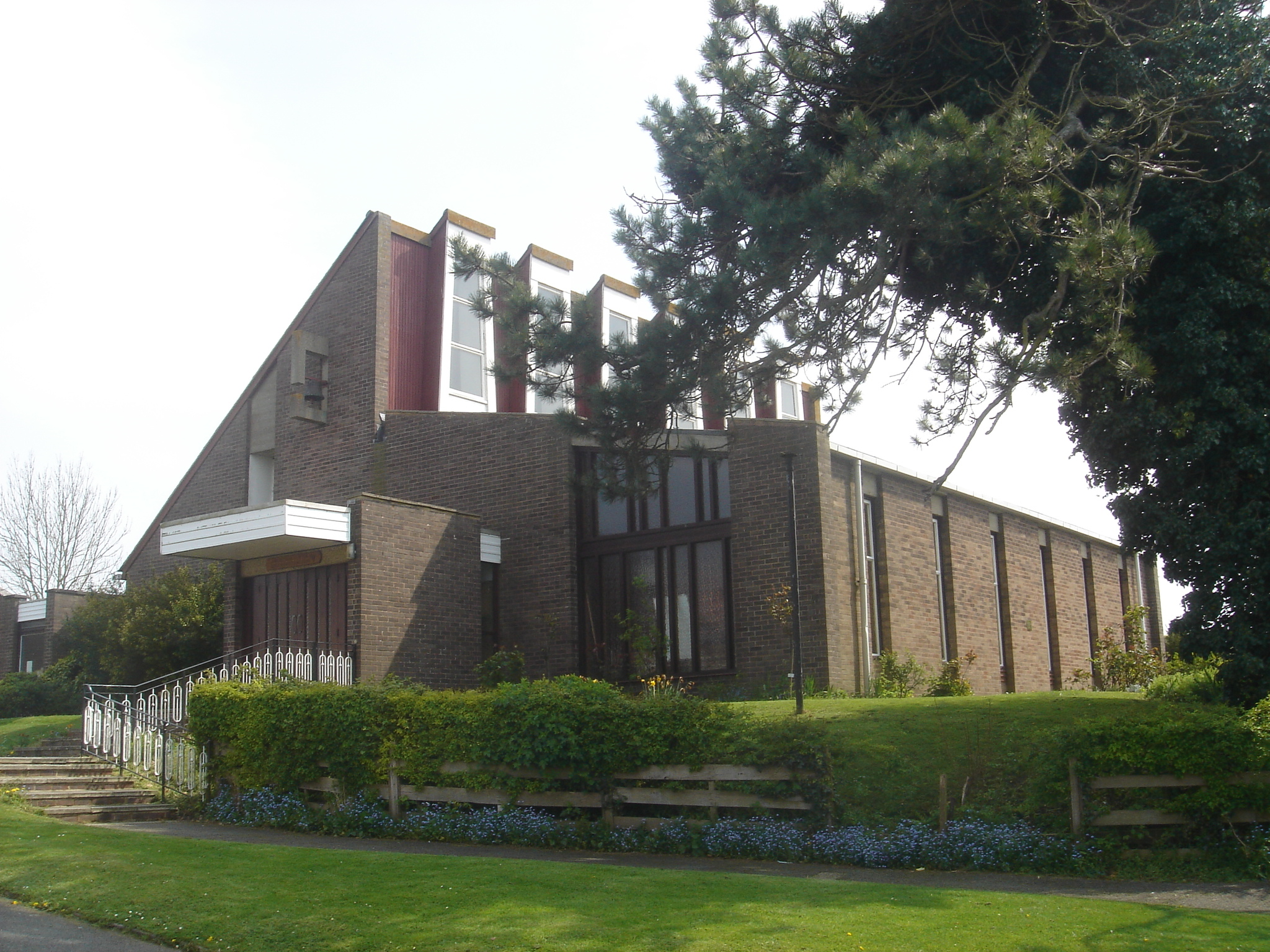
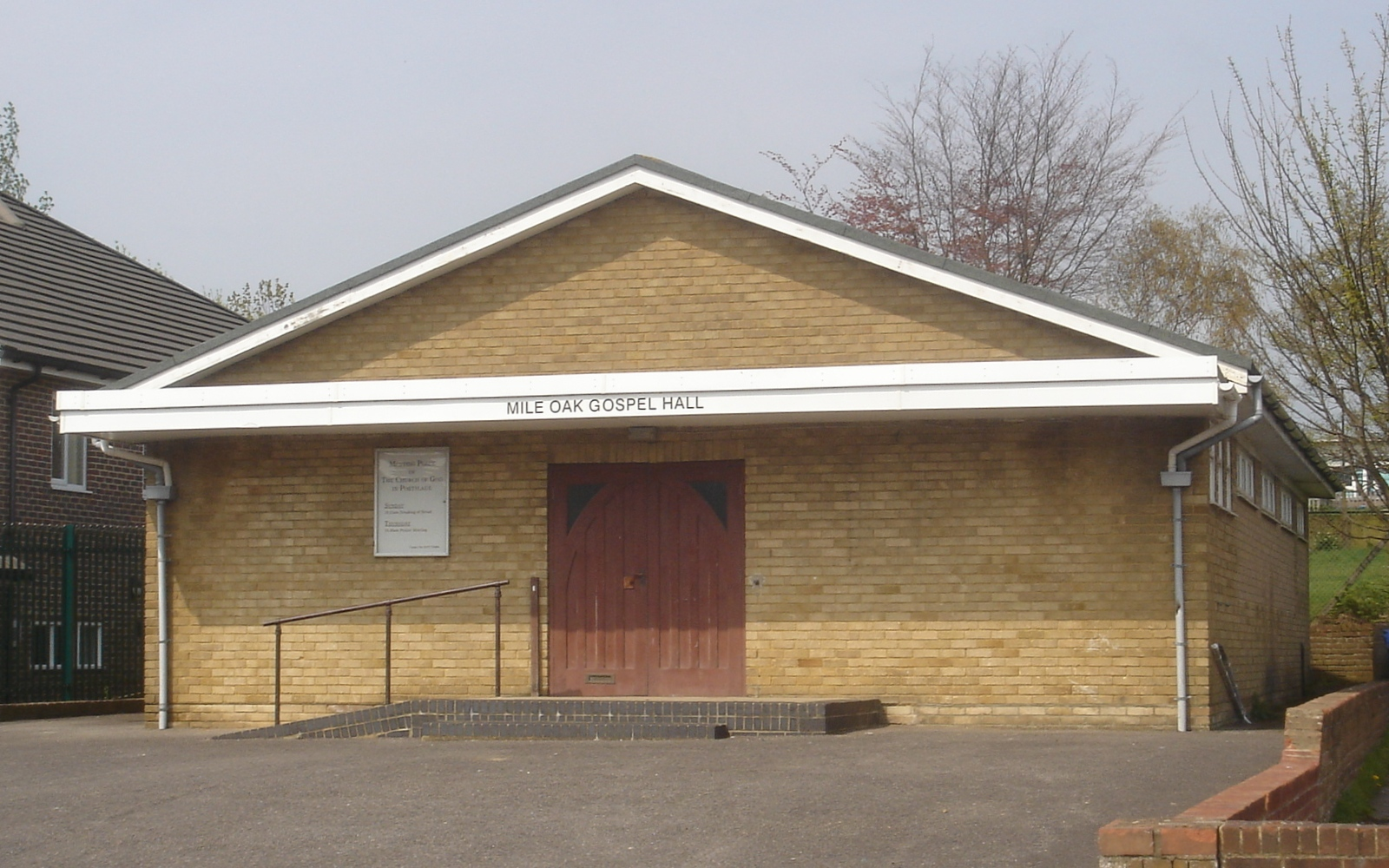
The Church of the Good Shepherd (left) and Mile Oak Gospel Hall

Planning permission for an Anglican church for the Mile Oak area was granted in March 1936, and later that year a tin tabernacle was acquired with help from the Church of the Good Shepherd, Brighton and a private benefactor. The land and building cost £450, and it was dedicated on 8 November 1936. Work to replace this temporary facility began in June 1966, and on 28 October 1967 the new Church of the Good Shepherd was dedicated. It was designed by local architects Clayton, Black and Daviel (scheme architect M. G. Alford) in a Modernist style and cost £25,000; local churches including All Saints Church, Hove and St Nicolas Church, Portslade contributed towards this. It was consecrated in 1994 and became a parish church in its own right in the same year, separating it from the parish of St Nicolas, Portslade. It is a locally listed building. Mile Oak Gospel Hall, a place of worship for the Church of God (Needed Truth Brethren), was built on Chalky Road in 1966. Hove Borough Council sold land to the community for £500, and construction cost £6,000; most of this was raised by the sale of the congregation's former chapel in Portslade. It was registered for the solemnisation of marriages in August 1968. The church closed in the early 2010s and is now occupied by the Brighton Wellness Centre.

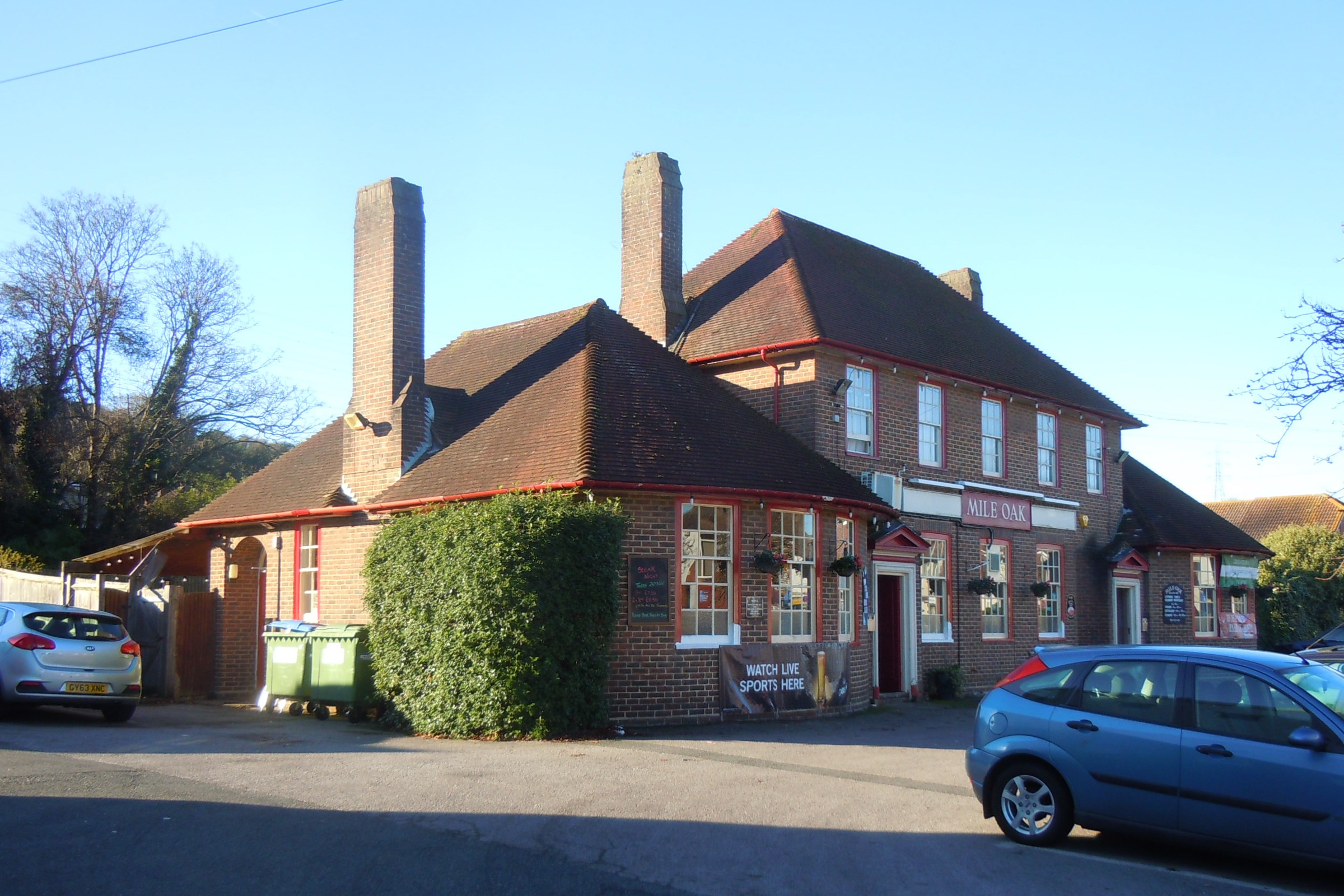
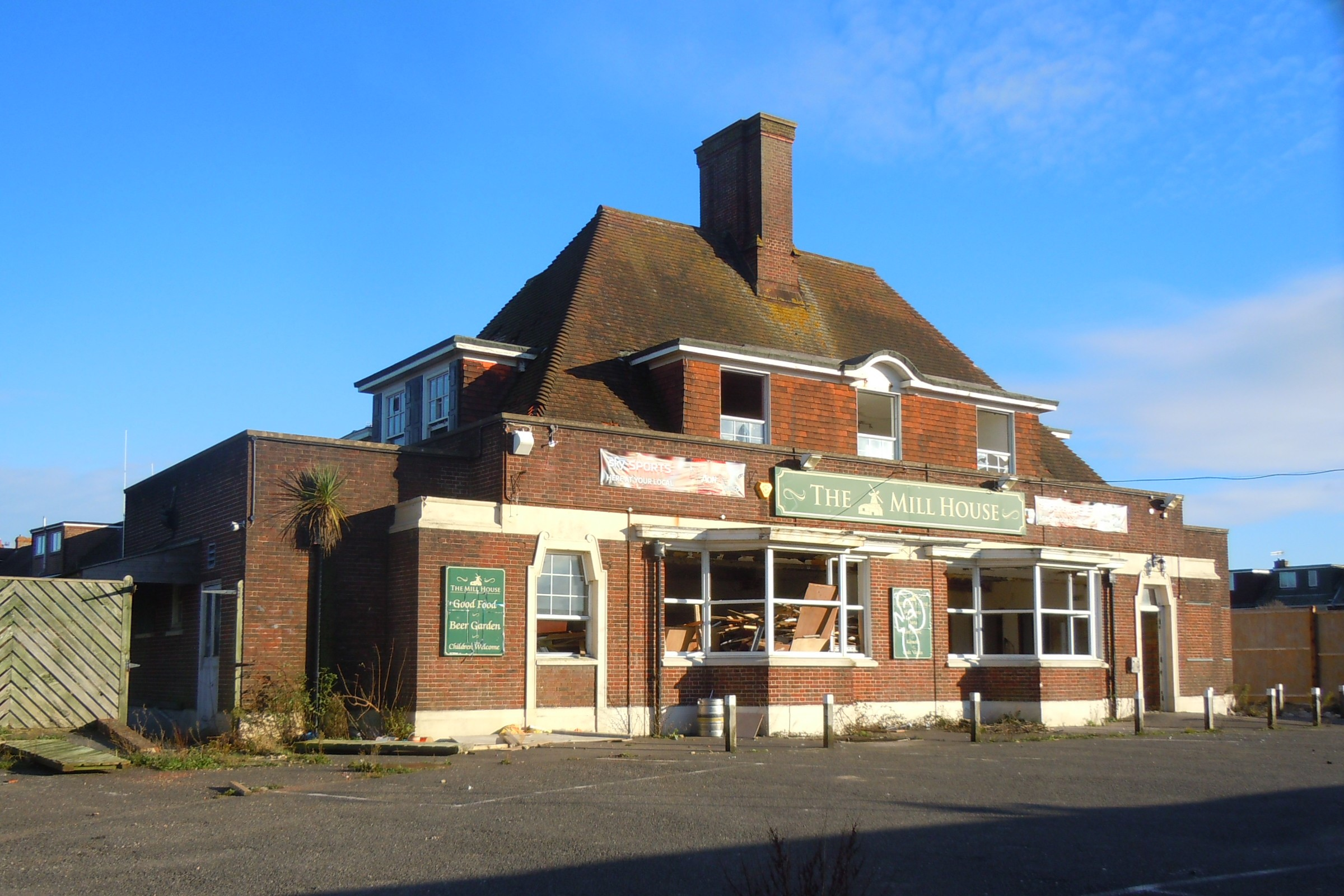
The Mile Oak Inn (left) and the former Mill House pub

The Mile Oak Inn on Mile Oak was designed in 1951 by local architects John Leopold Denman and Son for the Kemp Town Brewery of Brighton. It is Neo-Georgian in style and opened in December 1954. The Campaign for Real Ale have listed it as a "Heritage Pub" with a historic interior of regional importance, noting the prevalence of original features and the retention of its traditional three-bar layout. The Mill House Inn at the south end of Mile Oak, close to Portslade village, opened on Mill Lane in 1950 for the Tamplins Brewery of Brighton. It closed in July 2013, and a planning application for its demolition and replacement with houses was raised in July 2015.

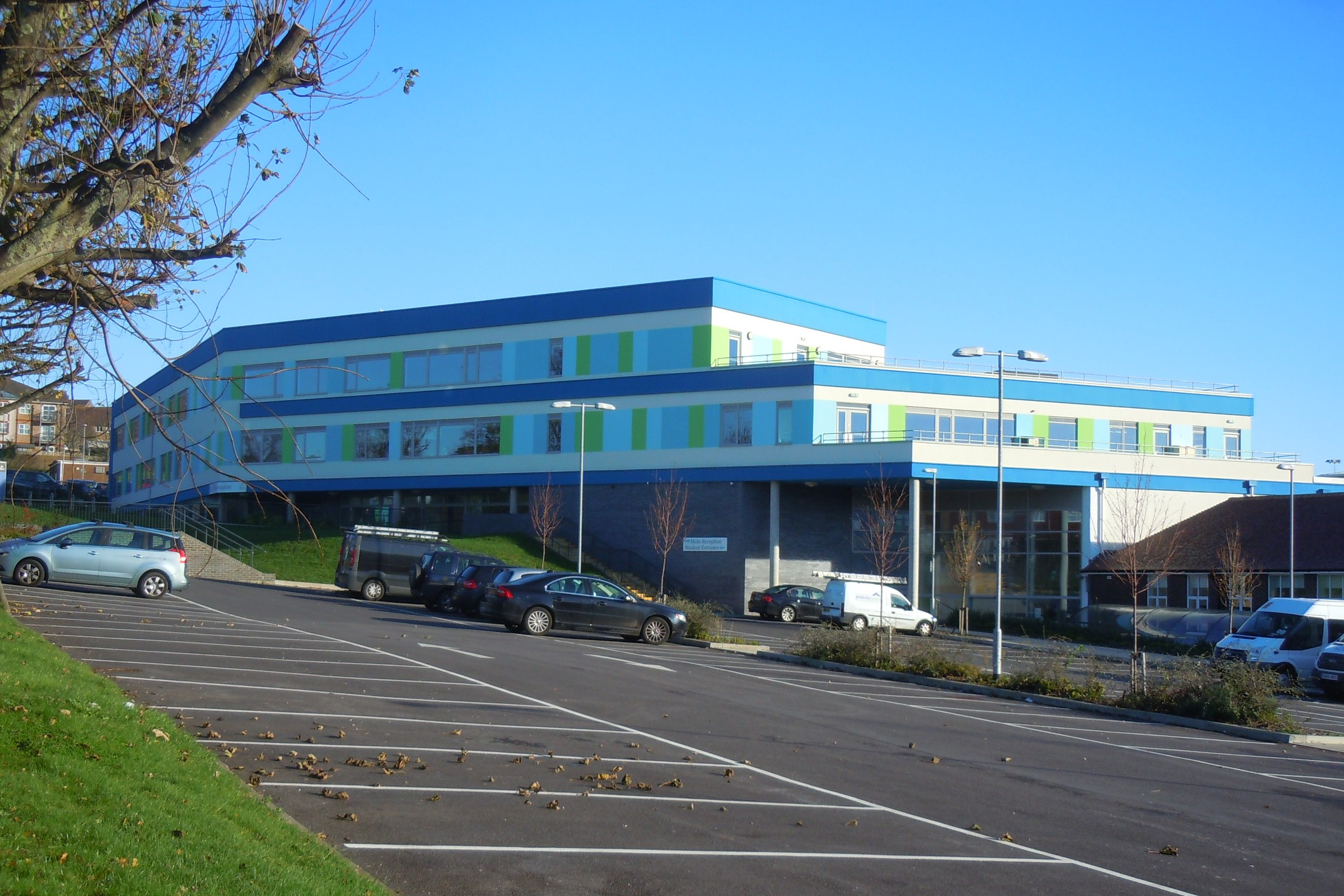
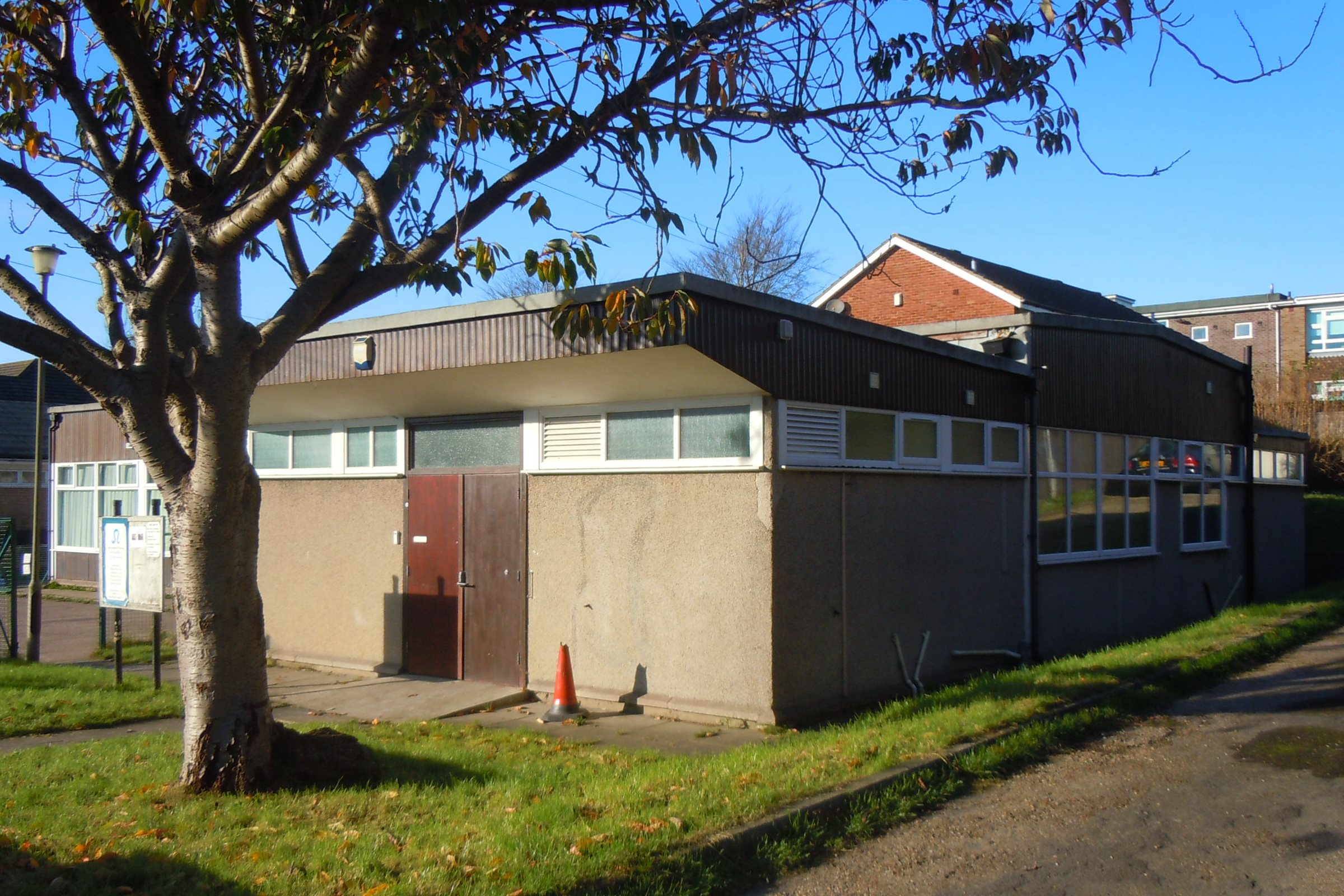
Portslade Aldridge Community Academy (left) and Mile Oak Community Centre

East Sussex County Council bought 12 acres (4.9 ha) of land at Mile Oak in 1937 and built Portslade Girls' School on the site. Pupils moved from a smaller school in Wellington Road in Portslade. The new building cost £19,800 and opened in 1940. It merged with Portslade Boys' School in Portslade High Street in 1972 to form Portslade Community College, which operated across both sites. The Chalky Road building was extended soon after this, and a library which could be used by the public was also provided. Until it opened in May 1975, Mile Oak residents had to make do with "a few boxes of books in the community centre". The school is now called Portslade Aldridge Community Academy and is based solely at Mile Oak, the Portslade High Street site having been sold to another school. The city council announced in June 2023 that the library would close on 21 July 2023.

Portslade Industrial School, a "handsome structure of red brick", was built jointly by London County Council (who ran it from 1913) and Brighton Corporation in 1904 at a cost of £30,000. It was a reform school for boys, many of whom were sent there from outside Sussex. Later names were Mile Oak School, Mile Oak Approved School and finally (in 1971) Mile Oak Community Home. It closed in 1977, and after a brief period when the sixth form of Portslade Community College occupied it, the building and its attached farm were demolished and the site redeveloped for housing.

Mile Oak Primary School opened in September 1965 on a site on Graham Avenue bought by East Sussex County Council 11 years earlier. It was designed by architect J. Catchpole and cost £48,000. By the start of the 21st century it had grown to be the largest primary school in the city of Brighton and Hove; an extension was built in 1999 at a cost of £475,000. Hill Park School, for children with special educational needs, was created in September 2019 from the merger of Hillside and Downs Park Schools. Downs Park School opened on its site on Foredown Road in October 1961, four years after it was established in the church hall of Bishop Hannington Memorial Church in West Blatchington. Hillside School opened three years later on an adjacent site.

Mile Oak Recreation Ground was laid out in the 1930s by Portslade Council. The land was part of a farm but had been used for dumping rubbish. It covers 3.4 hectares (8.4 acres) and is home to local football club Mile Oak F.C. A children's playground opened in 1992.

=== Downs Park ===
Downs Park is an area of late 20th-century housing at the eastern edge of Mile Oak, between the estate and Hangleton. Although located in the borough of Hove, the land was owned by Brighton Borough Council. They built some council housing, and other houses were built by private developers and housing associations between the late 1970s and the 1990s. The area has no community facilities of its own, although the large West Hove Sainsbury's supermarket is at the southern edge of the estate. The company bought the site in June 1989, and the store opened in October 1992 and was extended in July 1999. Since 1986 Downs Park and the Sainsbury's supermarket have been served by the Brighton & Hove bus company's route 6 to Brighton station via Portslade station, Aldrington, central Hove and central Brighton. A connecting road to the Mile Oak estate (Fox Way) was built the early 1990s but did not open until January 1996. A large park was built on the north side of this road on a former chalk pit—a site with a "peculiar shape" and steep slope—funded by a housing trust and Brighton Borough Council; Hove Borough Council agreed to maintain the park. It opened in August 1994.

=== Mile Oak and Portslade downland ===
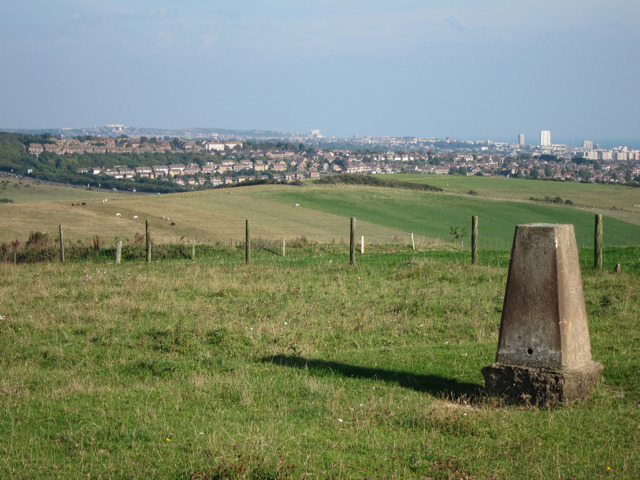
Trig point at Mount Zion

The A27 road separates the built-up area from a number of special downland areas to the north, which include Cockroost Hill to the northwest, Mount Zion to the northeast and Cockroost Bottom separating the two.

The name Cockroost may have come from the population of great bustard that used to inhabit the area and although bustards are no longer found here, there are some remarkable wildlife survivals, including the rare Pyralid Sitochroa palealis, orchids and butterflies. There is also a lot of history to be found on these slopes including a large 4000-year-old Bronze Age settlement, which may have been a henge (as in Stonehenge), as well as evidence of Iron Age and Romano-British farming activity.

Mount Zion's east slopes, north of New Barn Farm, are just as special. They have always been grazed and there are three valleys dotted with old anthills and orchids including the rare bee orchid. The most northerly valley has a little copse with hazel and dogwood. Goldfinches, linnets and migrant birds on passage enjoy its peace.

There are two notable pathways on this downland. One of the two Mid Sussex tracks of the Sussex Border Path starts here, roughly separating East and West Sussex, and runs north into the parish of Fulking and then east through Pyecombe and as far as Ditchling. There is also the final stretch of the Monarch's Way which passes through Mile Oak and Portslade and follows the seafront west towards Shoreham. The Way is a 625-mile (1,006 km) long-distance footpath that runs from Worcester to Shoreham.

== Transport ==
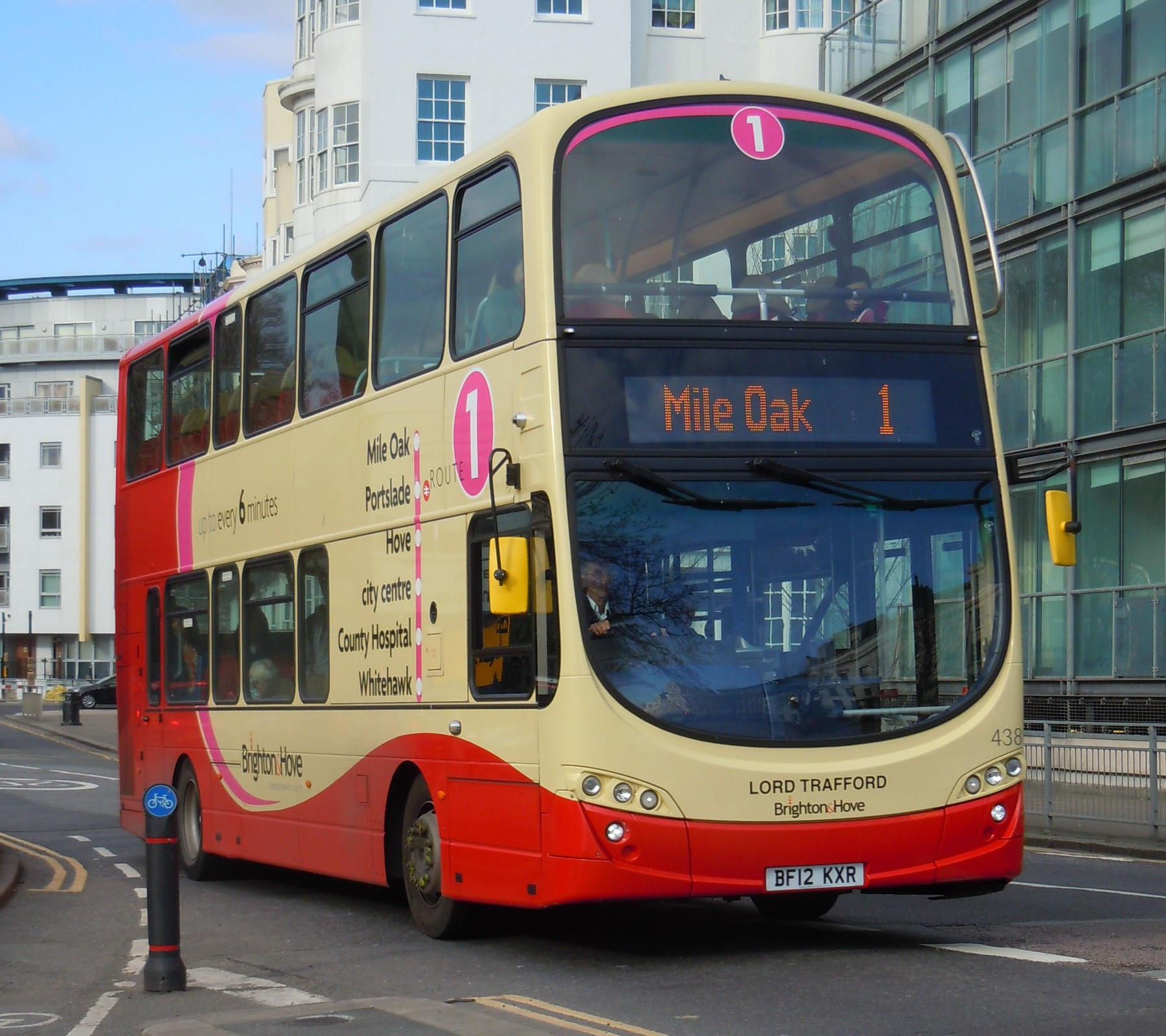
A route 1 bus to Mile Oak at Old Steine, Brighton

A bypass for Brighton and Hove, rerouting the A27 trunk road away from inner suburban areas, was first discussed in the 1920s, but the borough and county councils only voted in favour of one in 1980–81. A route looping tightly around the northern boundary of the Mile Oak estate and the rest of the urban area was chosen. Hove Council insisted that the road must run entirely to the north of Mile Oak, rather than passing through it; this pushed the route further north and added engineering complexity, and the Department for Transport stated in 1982 that the budget would have to increase by £5.75 million to accommodate this change. Another disadvantage would be that it would sever Mile Oak Farm's buildings from its farmland. Construction started in 1989, but the section between Mile Oak and Southwick Hill Tunnel was the last to be built, between 1993 and 1995. The whole route opened in April 1996. There are no junctions leading into the estate; access can be obtained via the Hangleton Link Road (A293).

The Brighton & Hove bus company run regular services around the Mile Oak estate on routes 1 and 1X. Destinations include Portslade village, Portslade railway station, central Hove, central Brighton, Kemptown, the Royal Sussex County Hospital and Whitehawk. Mile Oak's first bus service began in 1928 and ran from Portslade station to the waterworks. The "Mile Oak Shuttle", an express service to central Brighton using buses in a special livery, ran from 1982 to 1992.

== Sport and leisure ==
Mile Oak F.C. were founded in 1960 and play in Division One of the Southern Combination Football League, the tenth tier of the English football league system. They played in the Brighton, Hove & District Football League until 1987, when they moved up to the Sussex County League. Home games are played at Mile Oak Recreation Ground, which has been equipped with floodlights since 1996. Mile Oak Wanderers F.C. were formed in 2007 to provide youth football for the boys and girls within the local community. They originally played at Mile Oak Primary School, but since October 2010 all home matches have taken place at Southwick Hill Recreation Ground in Southwick, West Sussex.

Portslade Sports Centre is part of the Portslade Aldridge Community Academy complex on Chalky Road. It has two sports halls, four squash courts, two exercise studios, a gymnasium and an all-weather 3G pitch. The building, which opened at a cost of £115,200 in 1973, was designed by architect J. Catchpole.

== See also ==
- List of places of worship in Brighton and Hove
- Media related to Mile Oak at Wikimedia Commons

== Bibliography ==
- Carder, Timothy (1990). The Encyclopaedia of Brighton. Lewes: East Sussex County Libraries. ISBN 0-86147-315-9.
- Middleton, Judy (2002). The Encyclopaedia of Hove & Portslade. Brighton: Brighton & Hove Libraries.
