= Foredown Tower =

Former water tower in Portslade, Brighton and Hove, England

Coordinates: 50.8504°N 0.2159°W

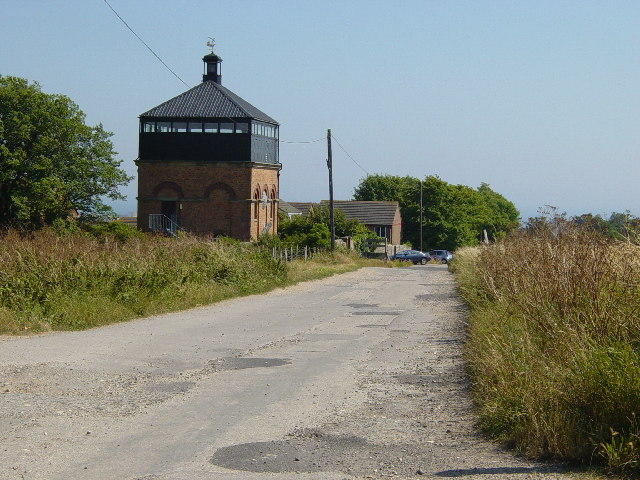
Foredown Tower

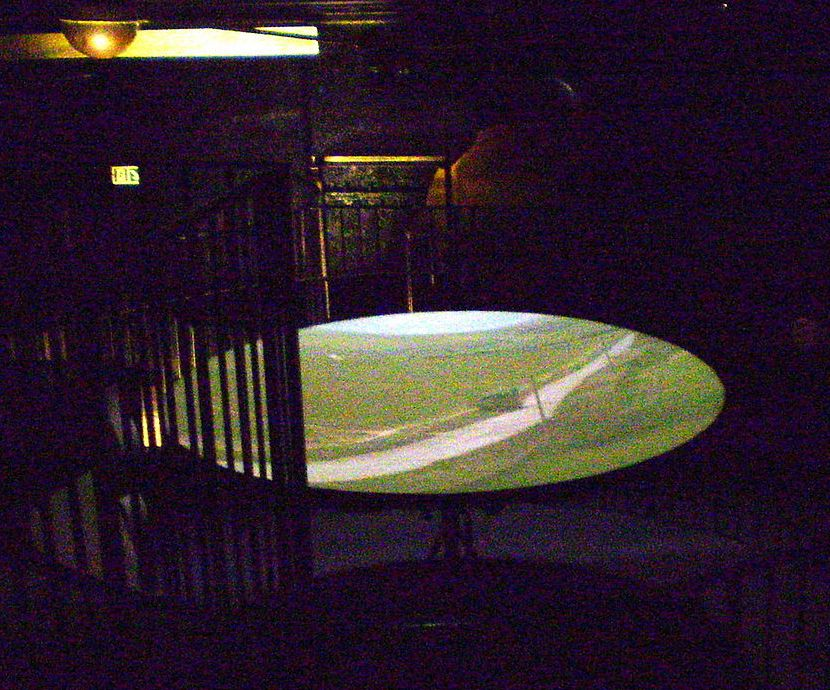
Image in the Foredown Tower camera obscura

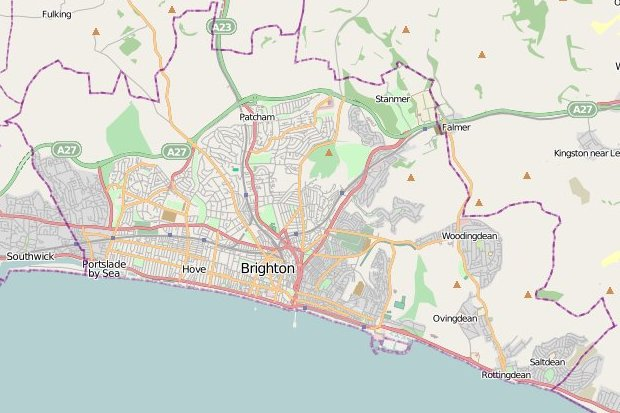
Location of Foredown Tower within Brighton and Hove

Foredown Tower is a former water tower in Portslade, in the city of Brighton and Hove, England, which has housed a camera obscura since 1991. It was closed to the public during the COVID-19 pandemic, and has not re-opened.

Built in 1909 as a water tower for Foredown Hospital, an isolation sanatorium for patients with infectious diseases, the structure was left standing when the hospital was demolished in 1988–89. After the installation of the camera obscura, which is located in a cupola at the top of the tower and projects images of the surrounding area onto a dish below, it was opened to the public in 1991.

The structure was operated as the Foredown Tower Countryside Centre by Brighton & Hove City Council's Museums & Libraries department until 2008, when the Conservative council decided it was "not economically viable as a visitor attraction". The council announced that the tower would be leased to the local Hove and Adur Sea Cadets for use as a base, with the intention that access to the camera obscura would be preserved.

Despite these changes, the tower served as the meeting place of the Foredown Tower Astronomers, an astronomical society that conducted classes and demonstrations at the site, using the camera obscura to observe the sky both by day and night, until January 2010.

The local council then investigated potential links with community organisations, and in September 2011 it was announced that the tower would be used as an adult learning and visitor centre under the administration of Portslade Learning Community CIC (now the Portslade Adult Learning CIC), which initially opened the tower sporadically for special events and short courses. In June 2012, the Foredown Tower Learning and Visitor Centre was reopened to the general public, with demonstrations of the camera obscura scheduled for Tuesdays and Thursdays and the last Saturday of the month. The camera obscura closed to the public during the Covid-19 pandemic and has not reopened since.
