= Lancing railway station =

Railway station in West Sussex, England

Lancing
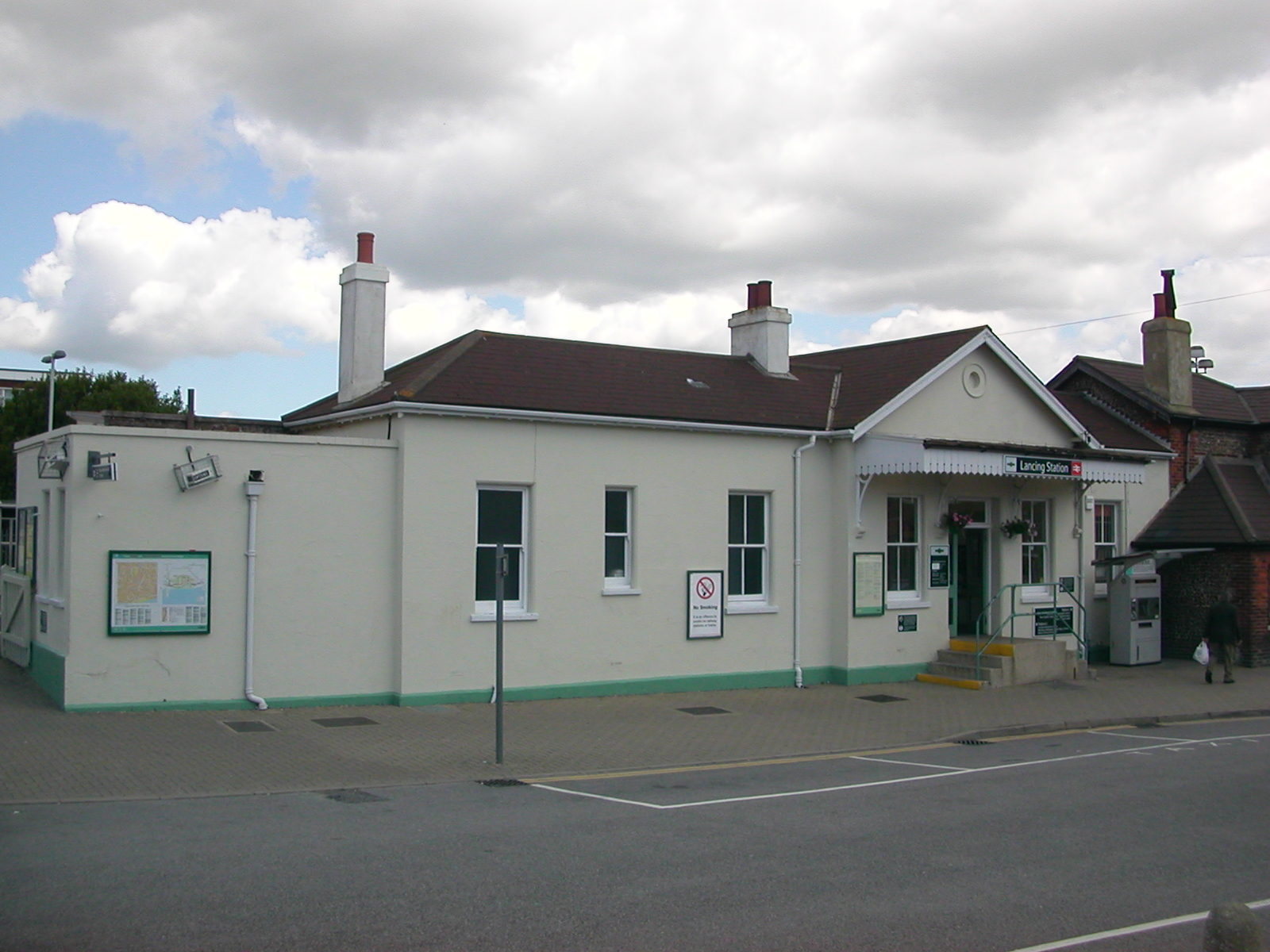

General information
- Location: Lancing, Adur, England
- Coordinates: 50°49′37″N 0°19′24″W
- Grid reference: TQ181043
- Managed by: Southern
- Platforms: 2

Other information
- Station code: LAC
- Classification: DfT category D

History
- Opened: 24 November 1845

Passengers
- 2020/21: ▼0.389 million
- 2021/22: ▲0.732 million
- 2022/23: ▲0.820 million
- 2023/24: ▲0.849 million
- 2024/25: ▲0.980 million
Location
Notes
- Passenger statistics from the Office of Rail and Road

Lancing railway station serves the village of Lancing, in West Sussex, England. It is a stop on the West Coastway Line and lies 8 miles 19 chains (8.2 mi; 13.3 km) down the line from Brighton. The station is managed by Southern, which also operates all services.

== History ==
Lancing station was opened 24 November 1845 by the Brighton and Chichester Railway when that railway opened between Shoreham and Worthing. The railway was originally constructed to double track standards, but only one line was initially provided, with the second line being brought into use between Shoreham and the Arun bridge during 1847.

The line and station passed to the London, Brighton and South Coast Railway when that was formed 27 July 1846. Passenger services at a number of stations, including Lancing, were temporarily withdrawn on 1 November 1847 and possibly reinstated in June 1849.

In 2020, platform 2 was extended, allowing it to accommodate eight-carriage trains.

== Layout and facilities ==
Platform 1 is for trains to Brighton and London Victoria; platform 2 is for trains to Worthing, Portsmouth Harbour and Southampton Central.

The station has a ticket office located on platform 2, which is open daily during the day, with three self-service ticket machines and ticket barriers. The car park has 54 spaces.

== Services ==
All services at Lancing are operated by Southern, using Class 377 electric multiple units; the typical off-peak service in trains per hour (tph) is:

- 2 tph to London Victoria, via Gatwick Airport
- 4 tph to Brighton
- 2 tph to Littlehampton
- 1 tph to Portsmouth & Southsea
- 1 tph to Chichester, via Littlehampton
- 2 tph to Southampton Central.

During peak hours, the station is served by a single daily service between London Bridge and Littlehampton.

Preceding station	National Rail	Following station
Shoreham-by-Sea	Southern West Coastway Line	East Worthing or Worthing
