= Fishersgate railway station =

Railway station in West Sussex, England

Fishersgate
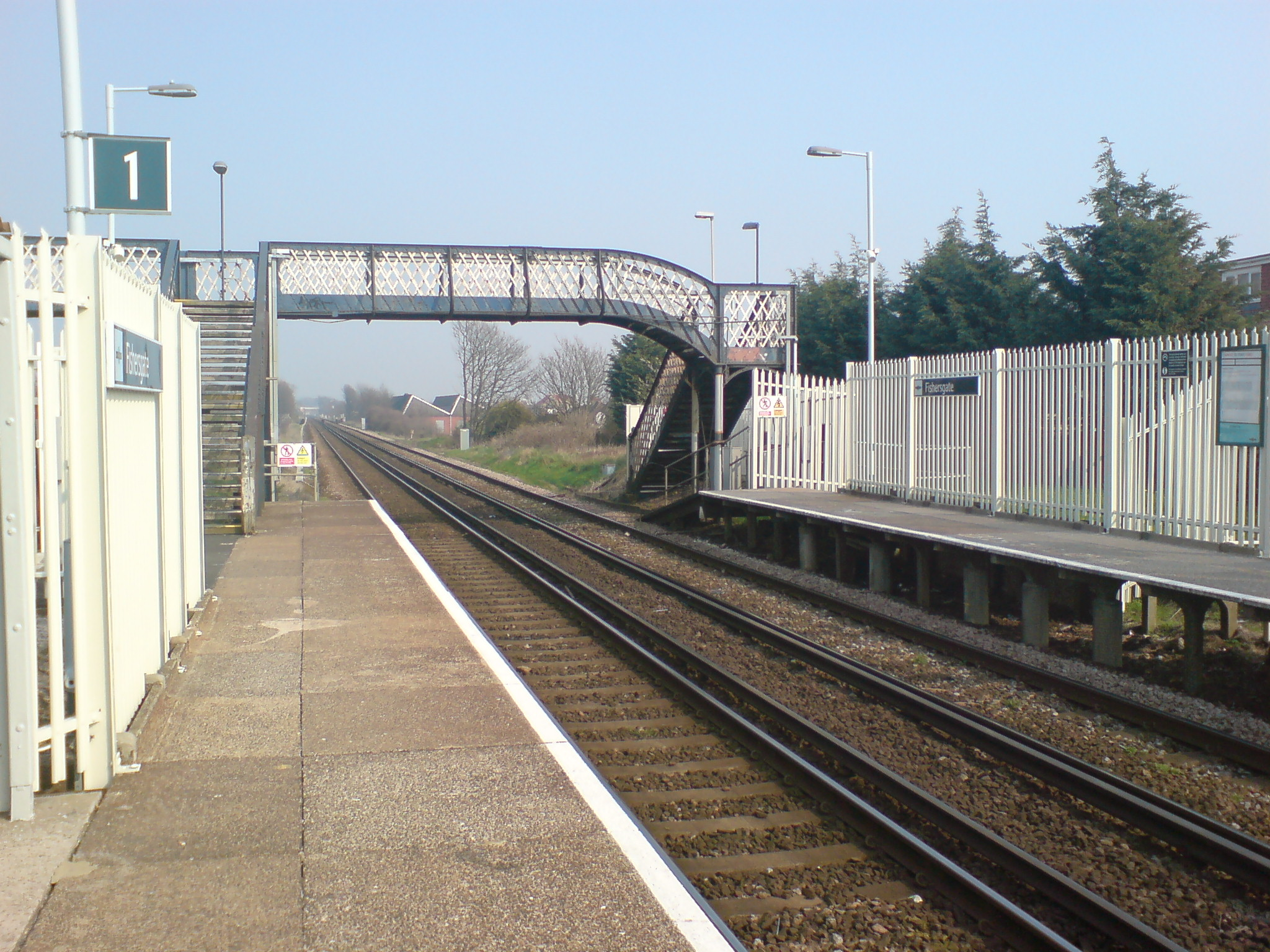

General information
- Location: Southwick, West Sussex, Adur; England
- Coordinates: 50°50′03″N 0°13′08″W
- Grid reference: TQ255054
- Managed by: Southern
- Platforms: 2

Other information
- Station code: FSG
- Classification: DfT category F1

History
- Original company: London, Brighton and South Coast Railway
- Pre-grouping: London, Brighton and South Coast Railway
- Post-grouping: Southern Railway

Key dates
- 3 September 1905: Opened as Fishersgate Halt
- 5 May 1969: Renamed Fishersgate

Passengers
- 2020/21: ▼41,660
- 2021/22: ▲86,774
- 2022/23: ▲90,452
- 2023/24: ▲92,022
- 2024/25: ▲97,326
Location
Notes
- Passenger statistics from the Office of Rail and Road

Fishersgate railway station is a railway station in West Sussex, England, serving both the eastern part of Southwick, as well as the western part of Portslade in Brighton and Hove. The station is operated by Southern and is 3 miles 47 chains (5.8 km) down the line from Brighton.

== Location ==
The station is unusually close to a major urban boundary (between Fishersgate and Southwick) with no nearby buffer zones. Immediately east of the station is the Vale Park area of Portslade and Portslade Village, for which this is the nearest station. Fishersgate itself includes a mainland residential area, to an outlying area towards the east end of Southwick and the Southwick football stadium, which is closer to Fishersgate station than Southwick. The east arm of Shoreham Harbour is separated from the English Channel by a 200 metre wide shingle spit with warehouses, and storage/loading yards. The western end of the spit of land, closer to Southwick, is the site of the gas turbine Shoreham Power Station and a Southern Water sewage treatment plant.

== History ==
The station was opened by the London, Brighton and South Coast Railway on 3 September 1905, and was originally named Fishersgate Halt. On 5 May 1969 it was renamed Fishersgate.

There is step-free access to both platforms.

The station is operated by Southern and is on the West Coastway Line. It has no ticket office, instead, a cash or credit card ticket machine.

== Services ==
All services at Fishersgate are operated by Southern using Class 377 EMUs.

The typical off-peak service in trains per hour is:

- 1 tph to Brighton
- 1 tph to Chichester via Littlehampton

Additional services call at the station during peak hours, including services to Portsmouth & Southsea

On Sundays, the typical service is:

- 2 tph to Brighton
- 1 tph to Portsmouth Harbour
- 1 tph to Southampton Central

Preceding station	National Rail	Following station
Portslade	Southern West Coastway Line	Southwick
