= Shoreham-by-Sea railway station =

Railway station in West Sussex, England

Coordinates: 50°50′03″N 0°16′17″W

Shoreham-by-Sea
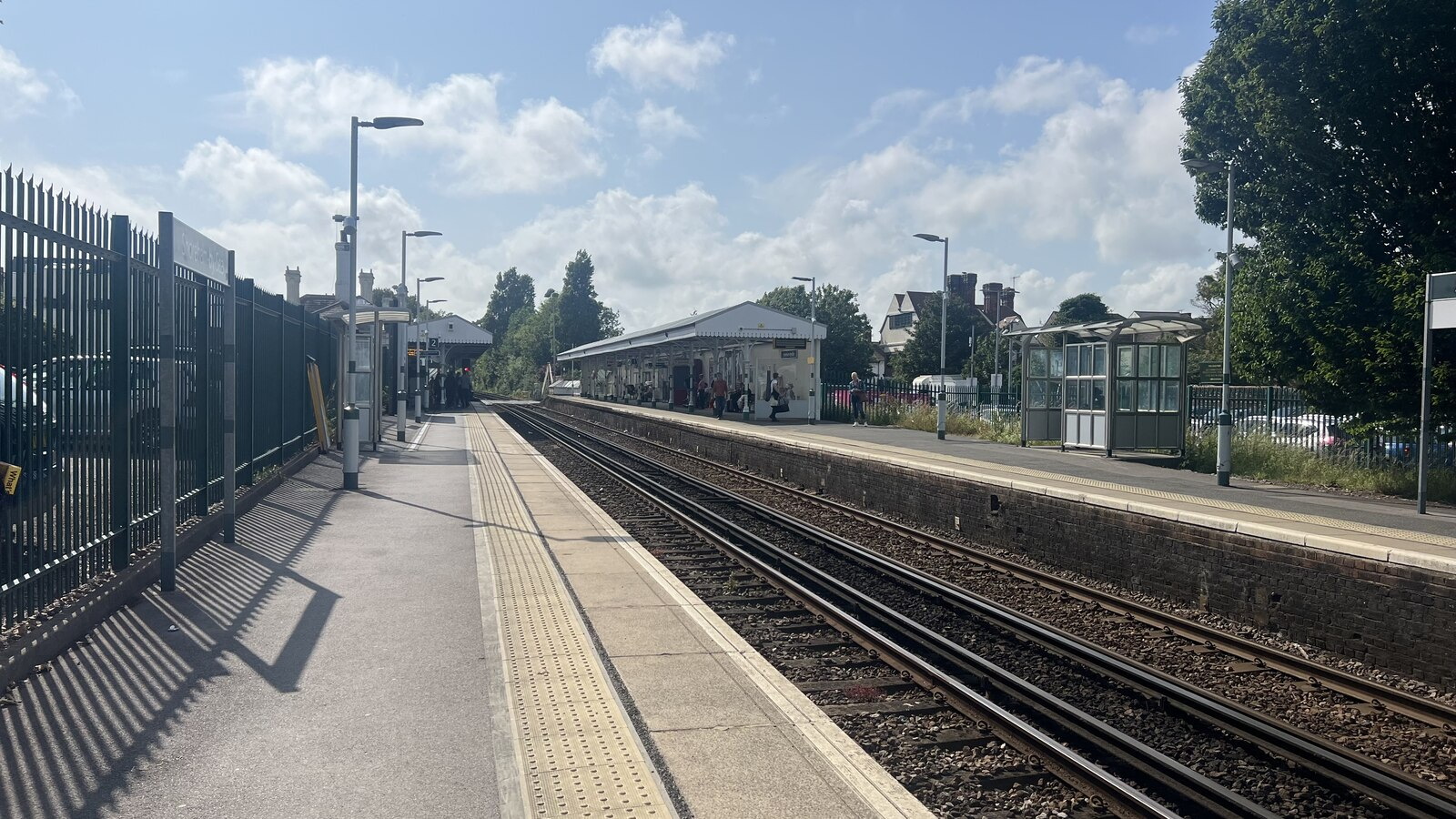
- View of the station platform in June 2025

General information
- Location: Buckingham Road, Adur, West Sussex; England
- Grid reference: TQ218052
- Manager: Southern
- Platforms: 2

Other information
- Station code: SSE
- Classification: DfT category D

Key dates
- 12 May 1840: Opened (Shoreham)

Passengers
- 2020/21: ▼0.418 million
- 2021/22: ▲0.946 million
- 2022/23: ▲1.101 million
- 2023/24: ▲1.176 million
- 2024/25: ▲1.303 million
Location
Notes
- Passenger statistics from the Office of Rail & Road

Shoreham-by-Sea railway station serves the town of Shoreham-by-Sea in the county of West Sussex, and also serves the nearby Shoreham Airport. The station and the majority of trains serving it are operated by Great British Railways under the Southern brand.

It is 5 miles 69 chains (9.4 km) down the line from Brighton. Both platforms can handle trains with up to 12 coaches.

== History ==
The original Shoreham station was a terminus built by the London & Brighton Railway and was opened on 11 May 1840. The original building was demolished in 1845 when the Brighton and Chichester Railway opened its line to Worthing railway station. The platforms were raised when the line was built up to get sufficient clearance for boat traffic on the river Adur to pass underneath the railway. Both railways merged with others in July 1846 to become the London, Brighton & South Coast Railway.

== Facilities ==
The station has a staffed ticket office which is open for the majority of the day on all days as well as self-service ticket machines available. The station also has a passenger waiting room, café and toilets which are open when the station is staffed.

Both platforms and the waiting room have departure boards as well as modern help points and are both fully accessible with step-free access available throughout the station.

The station has a large chargeable car park at its entrance as well as a large bicycle storage facility.

== Services ==
All services at Shoreham-by-Sea are operated by Southern using Class 377 and Class 387 EMUs.

The typical off-peak service in trains per hour is:

- 2 tph to London Victoria via Gatwick Airport
- 4 tph to Brighton
- 2 tph to Littlehampton
- 1 tph to Portsmouth & Southsea
- 1 tph to Chichester via Littlehampton
- 2 tph to Southampton Central

During the peak hours, the station is served by a single peak hour service per day between London Bridge and Littlehampton.

Until May 2022, Great Western Railway operated a twice daily direct service between Brighton and Cardiff Central that called at Shoreham-by-Sea.

Preceding station	National Rail	Following station
Southwick or Portslade	Southern West Coastway Line	Lancing
	Disused railways	
Southwick	London, Brighton and South Coast Railway Steyning Line	Bramber
