= Portslade railway station =

Railway station in Portslade, Brighton and Hove, England

Coordinates: 50°50′08″N 0°12′20″W

Portslade
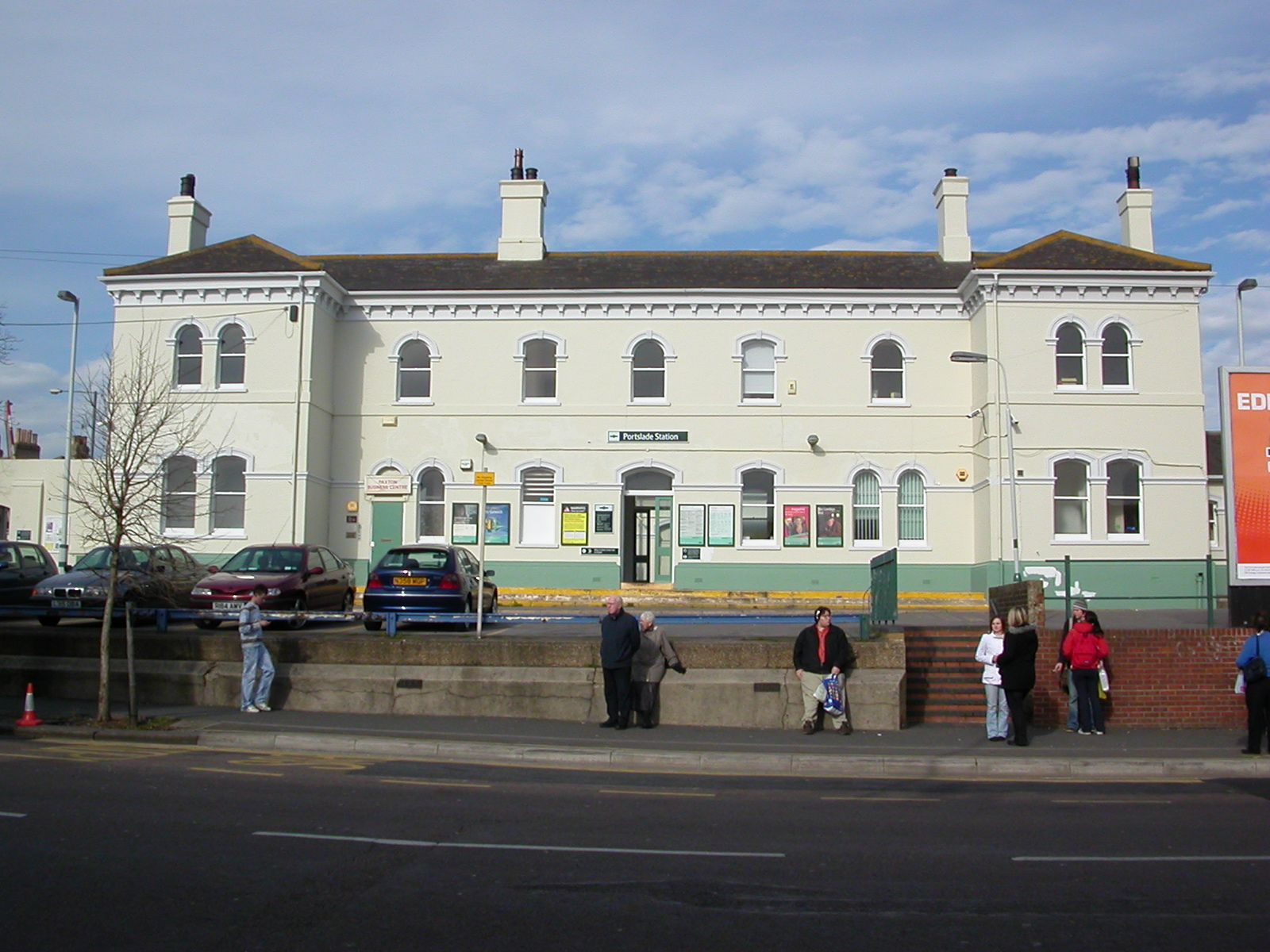

General information
- Location: Portslade, Brighton & Hove; England
- Grid reference: TQ264055
- Manager: Southern
- Platforms: 2

Other information
- Station code: PLD
- Classification: DfT category D

History
- Opened: 12 May 1840

Passengers
- 2020/21: ▼0.314 million
- 2021/22: ▲0.703 million
- 2022/23: ▲0.827 million
- 2023/24: ▲0.888 million
- 2024/25: ▲1.035 million
Location
Notes
- Passenger statistics from the Office of Rail and Road

Portslade railway station serves Portslade-by-Sea in the city of Brighton and Hove, East Sussex, England. It is on the western fringes of the village of Aldrington (sometimes known as West Hove) and is 2 miles 73 chains (4.7 km) down the line from Brighton.

== History ==
Portslade station was constructed by the London and Brighton Railway as one of the original stations on that railway's branch line between Brighton and Shoreham, opening 12 May 1840. The station was closed in July 1847 and did not reopen until after a partial rebuilding in 1857. One source states that the station was resited and rebuilt to the east of the level crossing in 1881, but the Historic England listing for the building says "the present building of 1857 is little altered".

== Operators ==
In 1846 the London and Brighton Railway became part of the London, Brighton & South Coast Railway, which continued until the grouping of 1923 and became part of the Southern Railway until nationalisation in 1948, when it became part of the Southern Region of British Railways.

== Services ==
All services at Portslade are operated by Southern using Class 377 and Class 387 EMUs.

The typical off-peak service in trains per hour is:

- 2 tph to London Victoria via Gatwick Airport
- 4 tph to Brighton (one of these calls at all stations and three do not stop at Aldrington)
- 2 tph to Littlehampton
- 1 tph to Portsmouth & Southsea
- 1 tph to Chichester via Littlehampton
- 2 tph to Southampton Central

During the peak hours the station is served by a small number of direct trains between Brighton and Littlehampton, as well as a single peak hour service per day between London Bridge and Littlehampton.

Preceding station	National Rail	Following station
Aldrington or Hove	Southern West Coastway Line	Fishersgate or Southwick or Shoreham-by-Sea

== Gallery ==
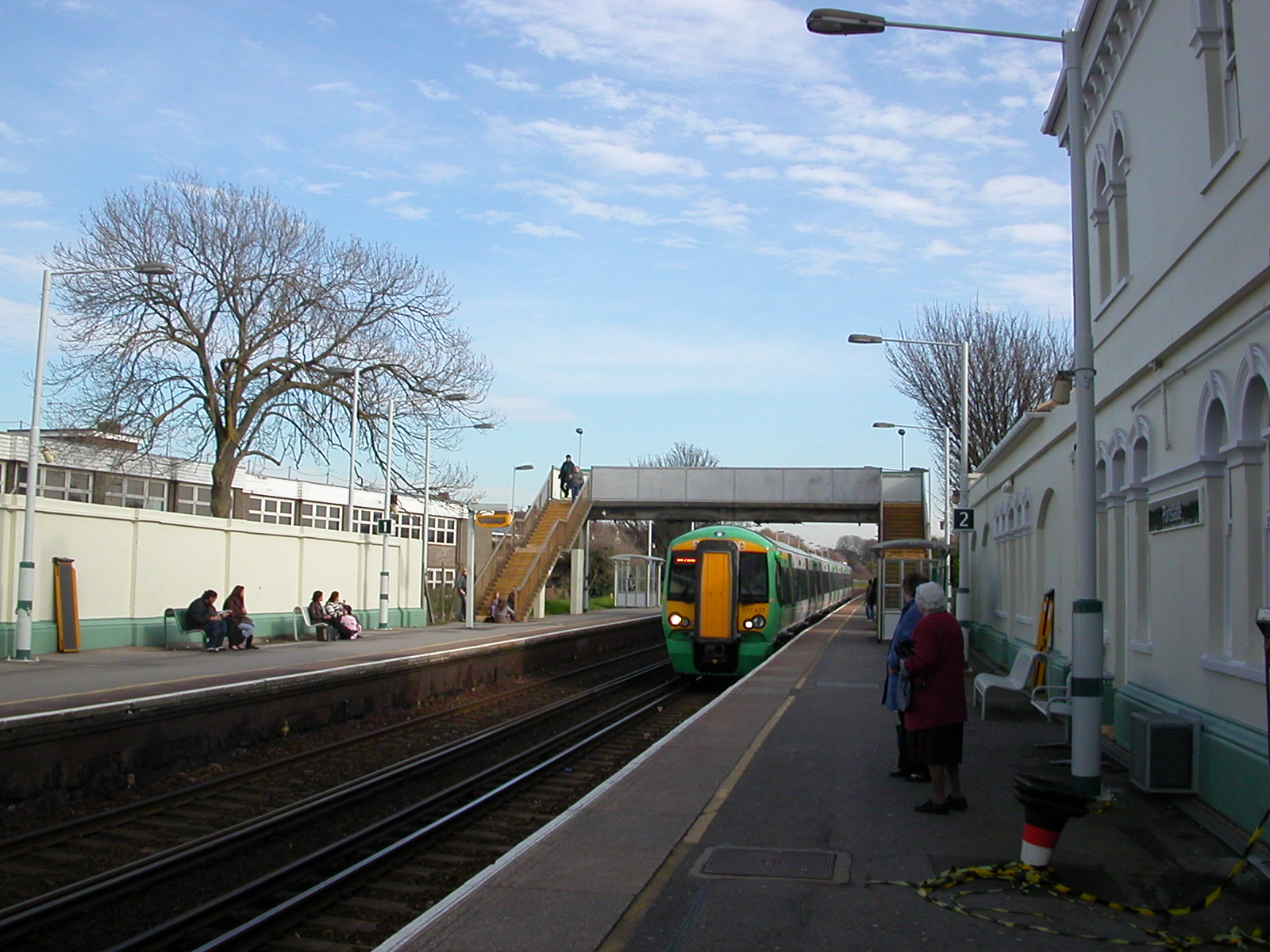
Southern EMU 377437 arriving with the 1300 Brighton-Littlehampton service on 17 February 2007

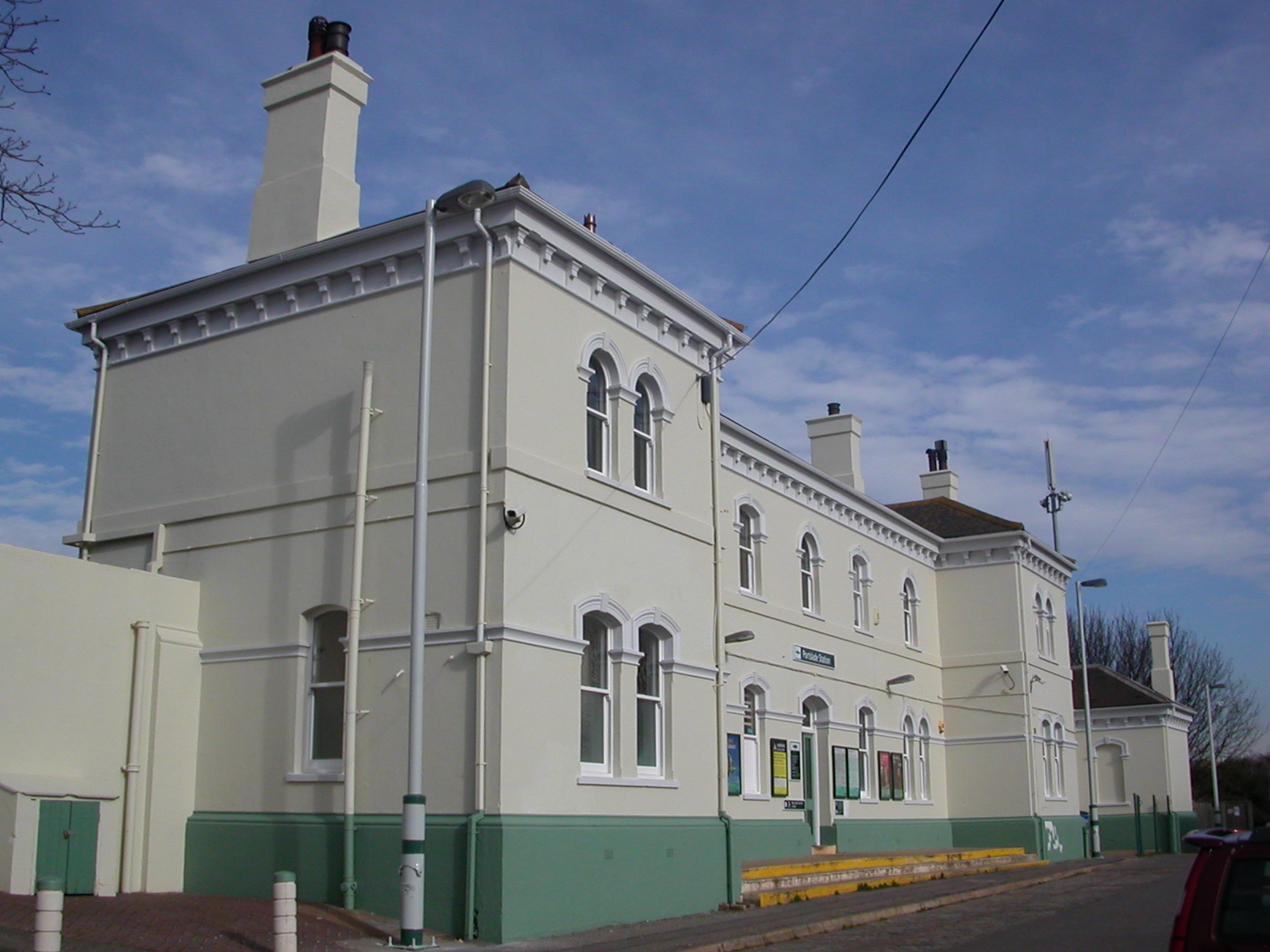
Side view of the main station building on the Down platform; the side entrance is through the wall on the left

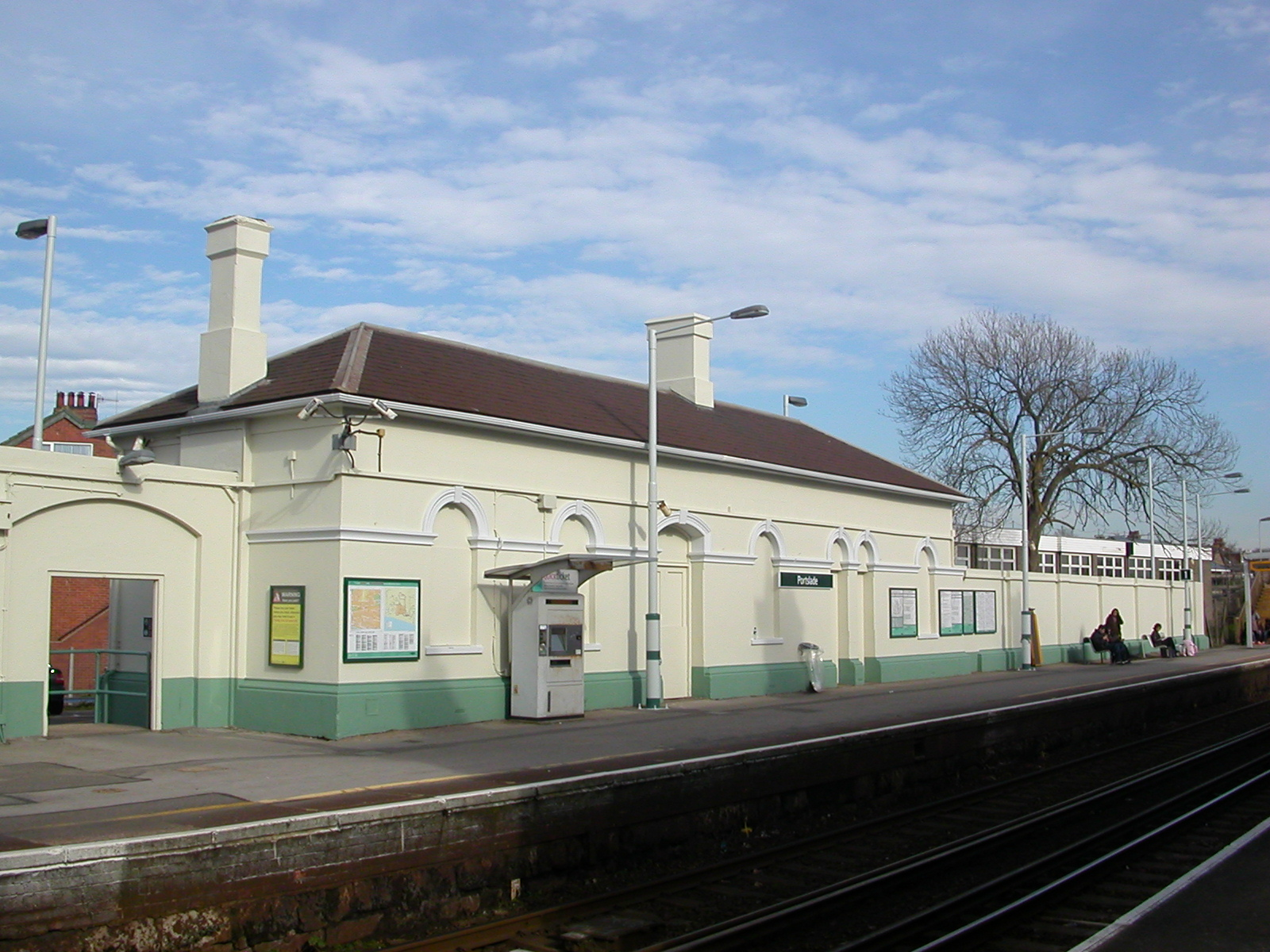
The single-storey building on the Up platform, no longer in use, and the Shere FASTticket self-service ticket machine

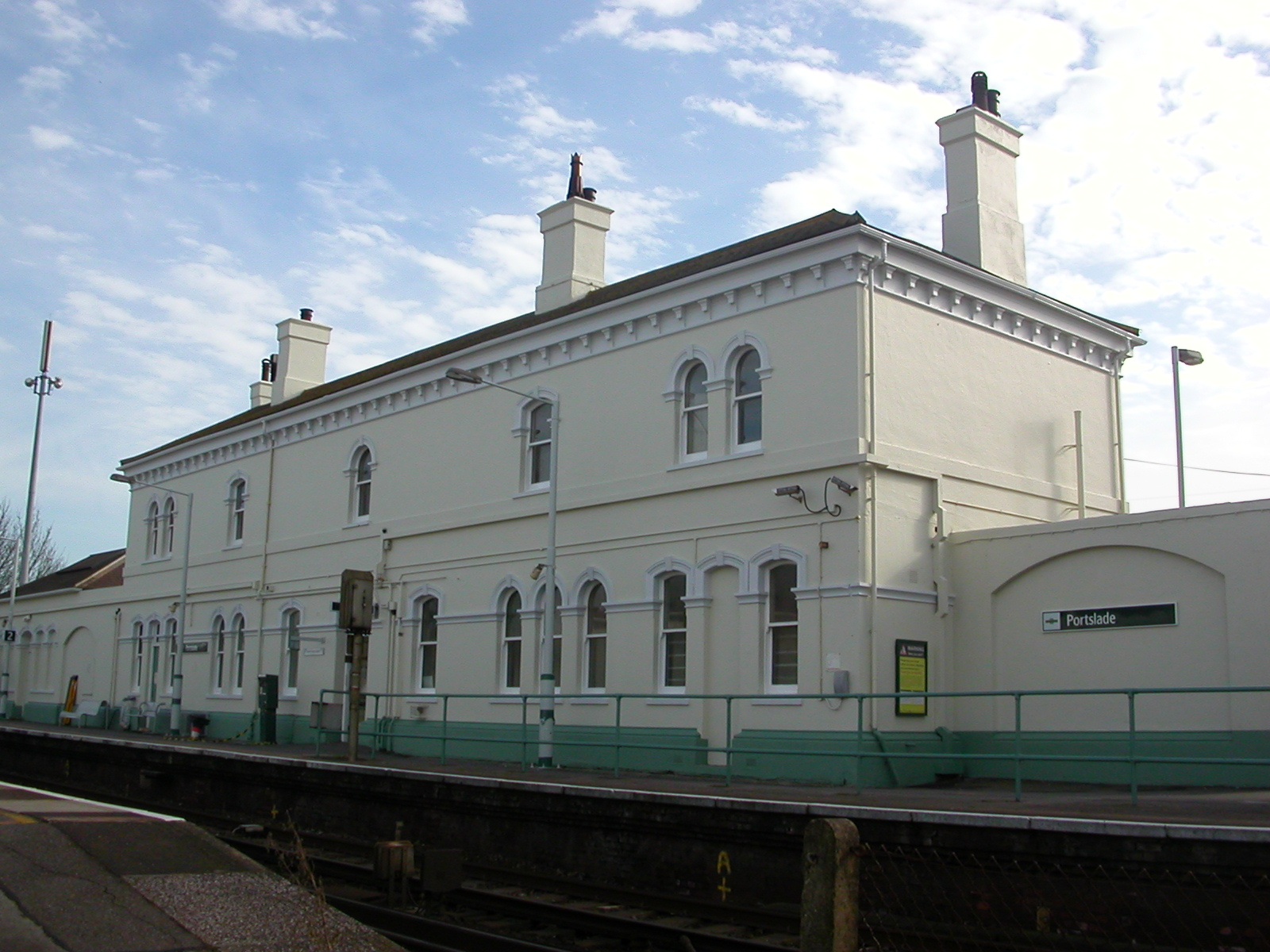
Platform-side view of the main building from rail height, standing on the adjacent level crossing

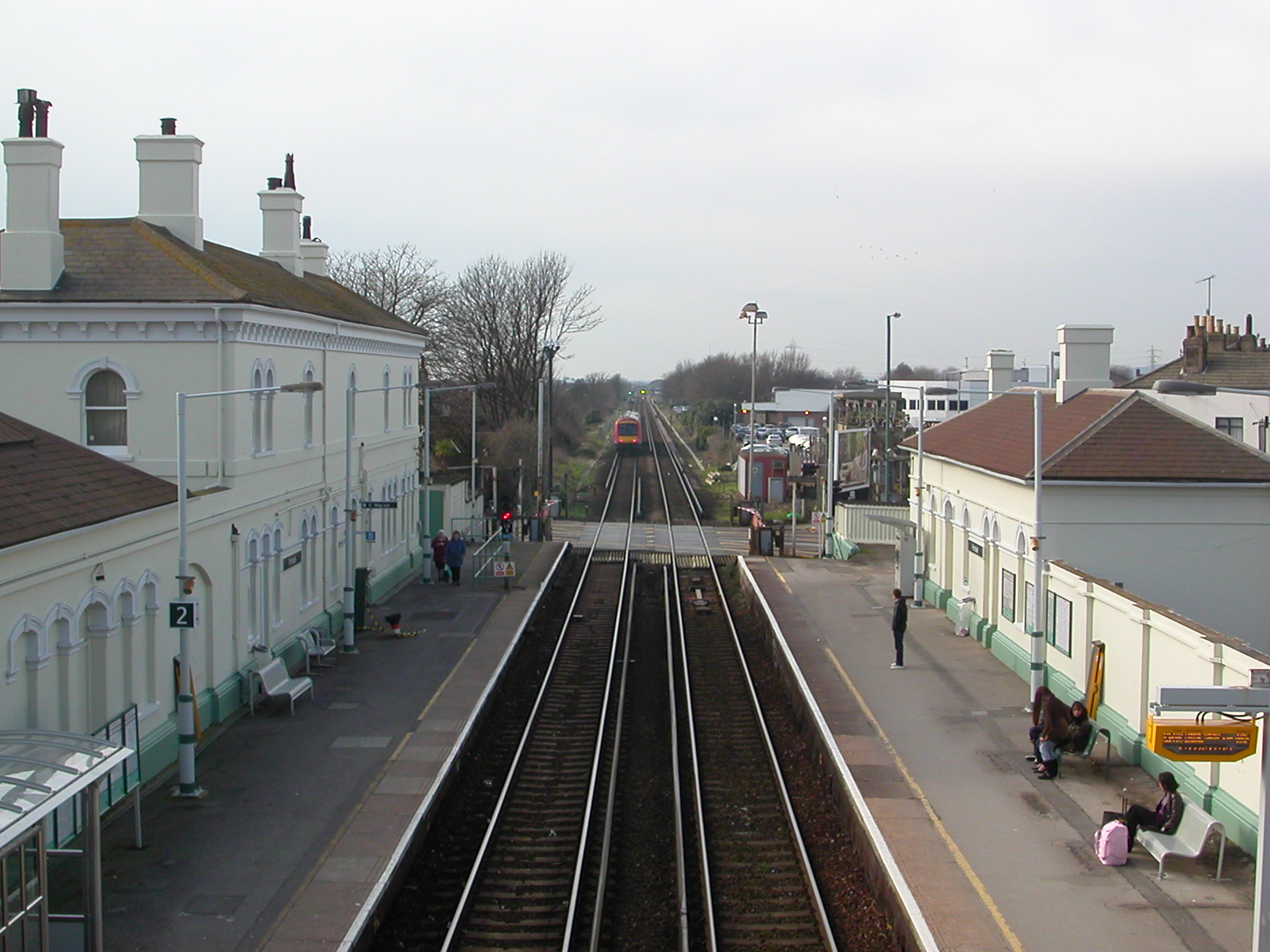
South West Trains DMU 170305 passes through the Down platform with the 1257 Brighton-Reading service on 17 February 2007

== See also ==
- Grade II listed buildings in Brighton and Hove: P–R
