= Samakkhi Witthayakhom School =

- โรงเรียนสามัคคีวิทยาคม
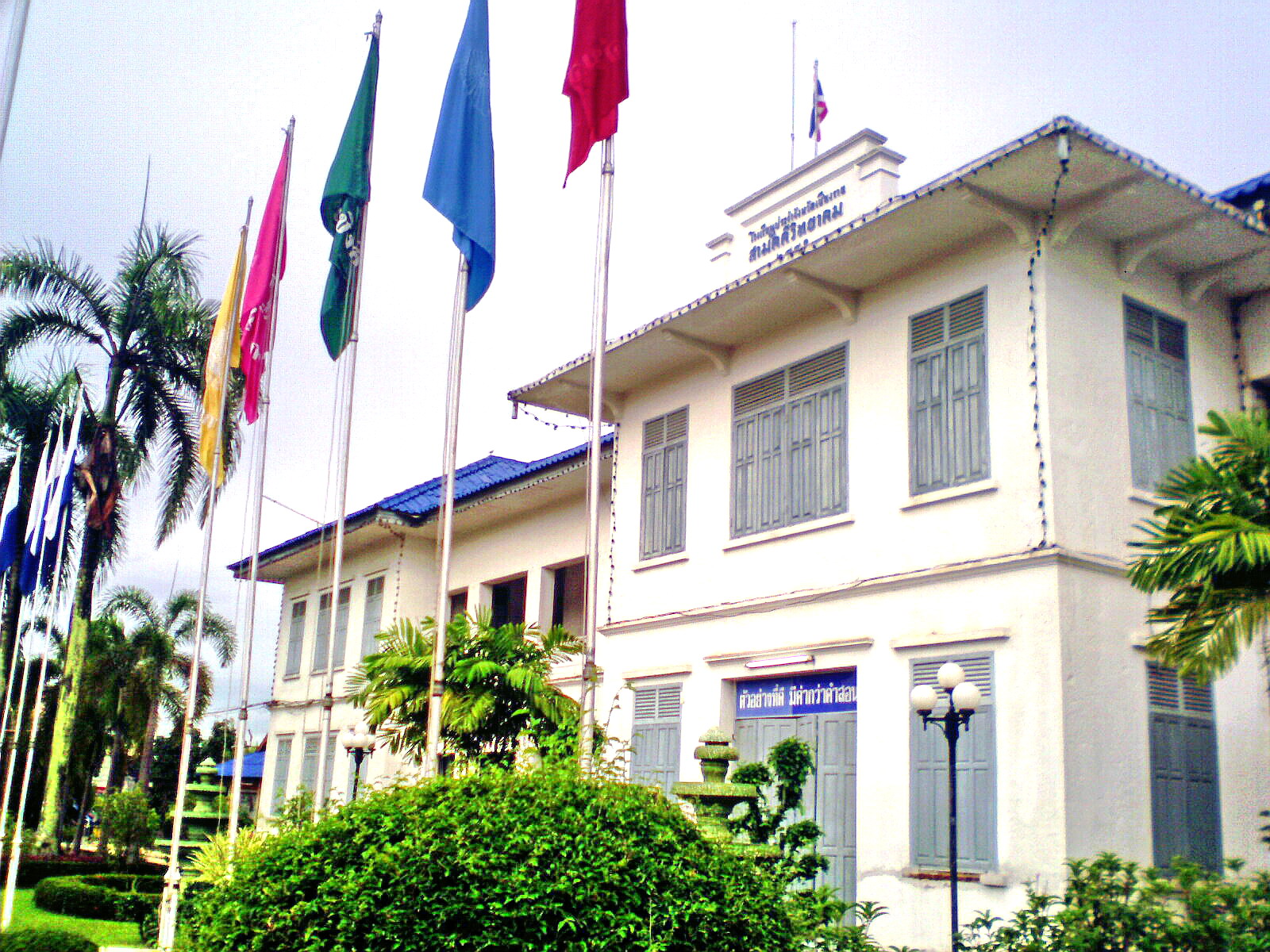
- Building 1, administrative offices, built during WWII

Location
- 159, Thanon Banphaprakan, Tambon Wiang, Amphoe Mueang Chiang Rai, Changwat Chiang Rai; 57000; Thailand; 19°54′24″N 99°49′38″E

Information
- School type: National budget, Public school
- Motto: Balaṃ saṅghassa sāmaggī (Unity is strength)
- Religious affiliation: Buddhism
- Established: 1908
- Founder: Phraya Si Suriyaratchawaranuwat (Suk Ditsayabut), Governor of Chiang Rai
- Status: State agency with juristic personality
- Oversight: Office of the Basic Education Commission, Ministry of Education
- School code: 1008570101 (present); 08570101 (previous)
- Director: Kanet Pongsuwan
- Staff: 400
- Faculty: 8
- Teaching staff: 250
- Grades: 7-12
- Gender: Co-educational
- Age range: 12-19
- Enrollment: 4,000
- Language: Thai, English, French, Japanese, Chinese, Korean
- Hours in school day: 10
- Classrooms: 100
- Colours: White and Blue
- Slogan: Be the finest education, the best comportment and the most excellent development
- Song: March of Samakkhi Witthayakhom School
- National ranking: 22 (out of 200) (2007)
- Budget: 190,341,710,300 baht (FY2008)
- Website: Samakkhi.ac.th

Samakkhi Witthayakhom School (SWK; Thai: ส.ว.ค.) (Thai: โรงเรียนสามัคคีวิทยาคม; RTGS: Rong Rian Samakkhi Witthayakhom; Thai pronunciation: [rōːŋrīːən sǎːmákkʰīː wíttʰājāːkʰōm]), or formerly, Samakkhi Witthayakhom Chiang Rai Provincial School (Thai: โรงเรียนประจำจังหวัดเชียงรายสามัคคีวิทยาคม; RTGS: Rong Rian Pracham Changwat Chiang Rai Samakkhi Witthayakhom), is a public high school in Chiang Rai Province, the northernmost province of Thailand.

Established by Chiang Rai Governor Phraya Si Suriyaratchawaranuwat (Suk Ditsayabut) in 1908, it is the twenty-second oldest public high school of the country, the fourth oldest of the northern Thailand and the oldest in Chiang Rai Province. The school celebrated its centenary in 2008.

The school is a state provincial agency with juristic personality, subsidiary to the Office of Chiang Rai Educational Area 1, the Office of Basic Education Commission, the Ministry of Education, respectively.

== History ==
The school dates to 1908. Its name was shortened to "Samakkhi Witthayakhom", meaning the "academic institute established by unanimity". At that time, the school was housed in the foothills of Wat Ngam Mueang, and only grade 4 to grade 6 was offered, extended to grade 9 in 1917.

In 1924, due to site limitations, Chiang Rai Governor Phraya Ratchadetdamrong (Phon Sarutanon) ordered that SWK classes be consolidated to grades 4–6 and grades 7–9. The younger grades moved to Wat Ming Mueang as an interim solution. Grades 7-9 were moved to Wat Chet Yot. The governor also raised funds to establish permanent office space for school administration.

In 1927, CR educational officer Luang Kittiwat granted governmental funds to the school to cover office construction costs. Grades 4–7 were pulled out of the school to become a new school entitled "Damrong Rat Songkhro School". SWK extended its offerings to Grade 12. Owing to construction delays, SWK acting Director Khuang Sukhontharot and CR educational officer Boonsing Boonkham disbursed 350 baht to purchase a six-rai estate at Wat San Pa Daeng from the American missionary Ray W. Battelle, and further adjacent estates amounting to about one plaeng (Thai measurement unit). Land and money were donated to the school by the government, public servants, and aristocrats, including, among others, physician and former Minister of Public Health, Sem Phringphuangkaeo, and 600 million baht from the Council of Ministers.

A panel was set up by CR Administration to supervise construction, with Boonsing Boonkham as chair. The panel hired a Chinese construction company. On 2 March 1937, a ceremony was held to lay the cornerstone for the permanent office. On 11 February of the following year CR Governor Phra Phanom Nakharanurak (Hokkai Phisanlabut) presided over the inauguration of the main building.

Upon completion of construction, the Council of SWK Government Teachers resolved in 1940 to use the school flag and anthem. The abbreviation "SWK" and the motto Balaṃ saṅghassa sāmaggī ("unity is strength") were also officially invented and declared. Following that, many buildings were installed at the school to serve public needs.

In 1993 female students were accepted by SWK for the first time. The Regional Scientific and Technological Education Centre was opened at the school. The Regional Arts Centre was also opened in 2002, followed by advent of the "English Programme" for grade 7–9, as well as Thailand's Self English Access Centre under the patronage of the World Bank, the "Buddhist School" Project, and the "Technological School" project.

Due to increases in enrolment the government announced, in 1994, the opening of a branch of SWK to be known as "Samakkhi Witthayakhom School 2".

The school celebrated its centennial in 2007. The celebration was held under the banner, "Uniting Hearts, Uniting Wills, the Centenary of Samakkhi Witthayakhom School 2008". The Centenary Building, opened in May 2007, was given the name "King's 80th Birthday Anniversary Commemorative Building" by Bhumibol Adulyadej — presided over by Maha Chakri Sirindhorn.

== Symbols ==
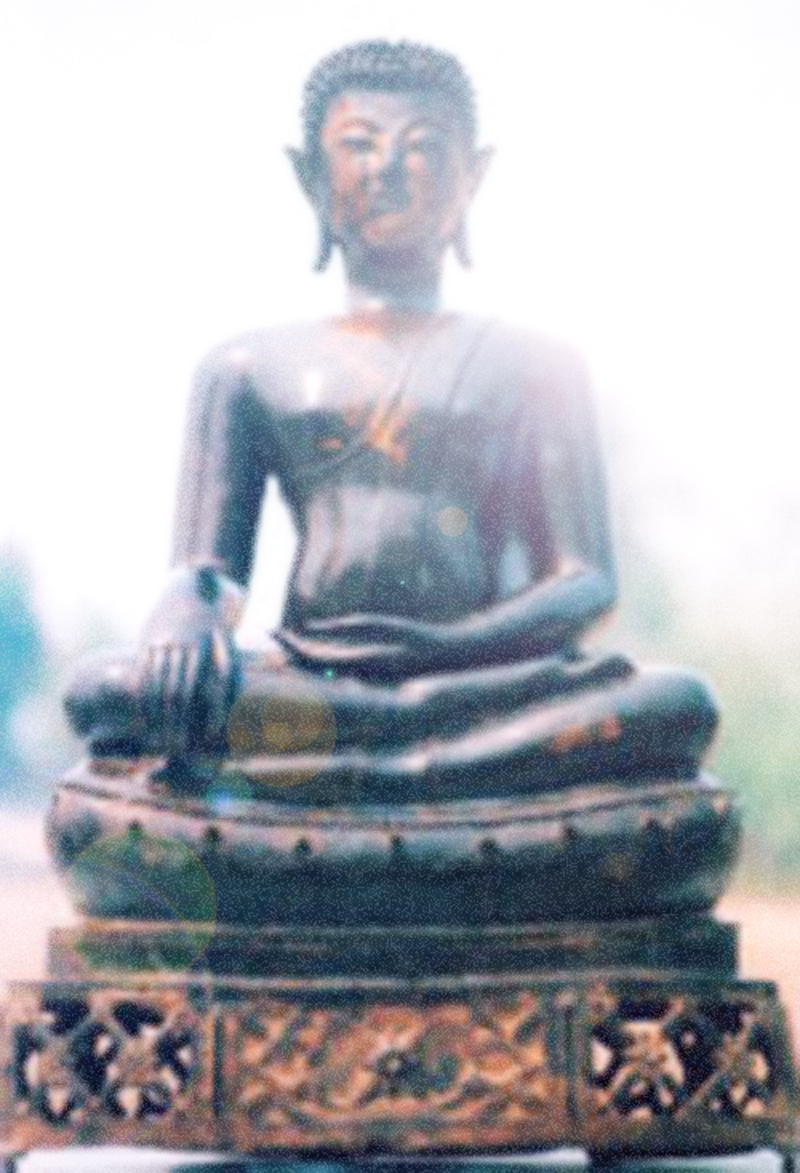
Phra Phutthamani Maitri Rattana

The school motto is: Balaṃ saṅghassa sāmaggī (Pāḷī) or "Unity is strength". Its slogan is: "The finest education, the best comportment, and the most excellent development".

The school anthem is March of Samakkhi Witthayakhom, composed by the Council of Teaching Staffs of the school in 1940 for use in cheering sport competitions. The march lyrics invite people to come join the school's sport competitions, as well as call for unity and perseverance among the competitors.

Seal: The seal of the school is composed of a strand tightly roped in the figure of the abbreviated school title in Thai, "ส.ว.ค.", as a symbol of unity. Under the strand lie the clouds representing respectfulness. Upon the strand, there is the royal insignia with glorious light, as a sign of illumination. And beneath the strand is the establishment year in Buddhist Era and the ribbon with the school motto.

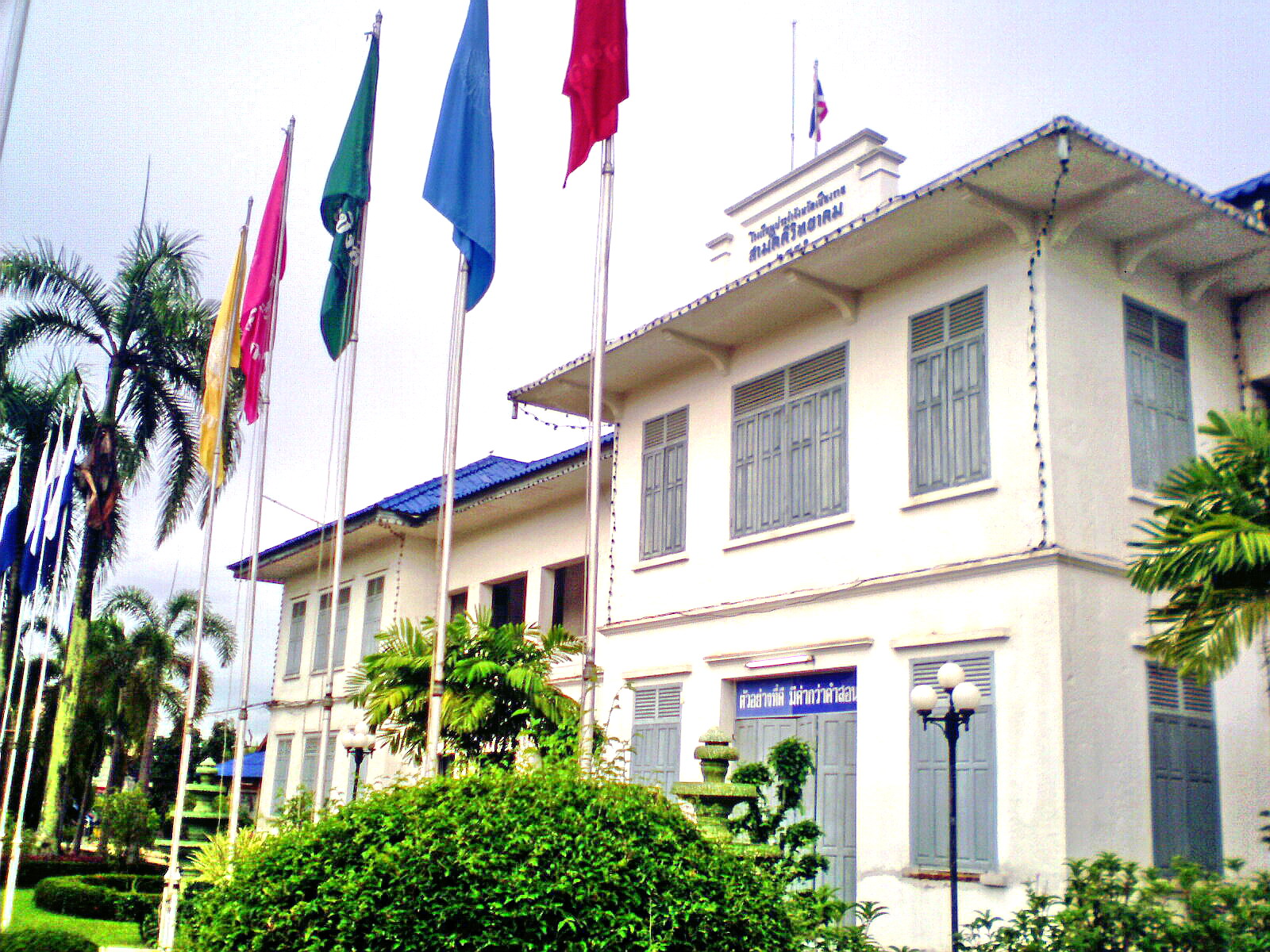
Building 1

== Awards ==
- 1990 Royal Best Secondary School Award, granted by Bhumibol Adulyadej's daughter Maha Chakri Sirindhorn at Dusitalaya Hall, Chitralada Palace, Bangkok, 20 May 1991, for extensively pursuing the public advancement
- "Best Classroom Advancement School" Reward granted by CR Educational Office in 1996
- "Best School for Educational Reform" Reward from CR Governor in 2001
- "Best Curricular Arrangement School" Award from the Government in 2002
- "Best Buddhist Development and Support School" Award from the Office of National Buddhism in 2004
- "Example School for Democratic Development" Award from Privy Councillor Prof Kasem Watthanachai in 2005.

== Administrators ==
No.	Name	Years in office
Principals
1.	Vice Grand Secretary Chit	1914–1916
2.	Vice Grand Secretary Pui Yuwawan	1916–1922
3.	Vice Grand Secretary Chuea Kusonlawong	1922–1925
4.	Vice Grand Secretary Amnuai Makhatsathian	1925–1927
5.	Vice Grand Secretary Khun Minanan	1927-1929 (First period); 1930-1932 (Second period)
6.	Vice Grand Secretary Dai Buranakon	1929–1932
7.	Vice Grand Secretary Inthrathat Sirorot	1932–1935
Headmasters
8.	Khuang Sukhonthasan	1935–1938
9.	Uthit Patchimaphirom	1938–1941
10.	Sophit Sukkasem	1941–1953
11.	Prasit Thanapanyo	1953–1962
12.	Muan Thanachaikhan	1962–1969
13.	Banchong Phongsat	1969–1977
Directors
14.	Somsak Sisuwan	1977–1984
15.	Prasit Saenchai	1984–1987
16.	Arun Asa	1987–1989
17.	Bunsong Chailam	1989–1994
18.	Thara Chatuprayun	1994–2000
19.	Kittichot Hoiyiphu	2000-2004 (First period); 2004-9 January 2007 (Second period)
20.	Pricha Phuanukunnon	10 January 2007 – 25 January 2008
21.	Kittichai Thongpanya (Director ad interim)	26 January 2008 – 30 June 2008
22.	Thawisak Phiphatthanasak	1 July 2008 – 30 September 2010
23.	Yutthasak Supphaphatthrayut (Director ad interim)	1 October 2010 – 23 December 2010
24.	Prasoet Kanthawang	24 December 2010 – 30 September 2015
25.	Tawat Chumchob	21 October 2015 – 30 September 2018
26.	Adul Nanbancha	22 October 2018 – 30 September 2019
27.	Kanet Pongsuwan	1 November 2019 – present

== Notable alumni ==
- Thawan Duchanee: Painter, National artist 2001
- Jiradapa Intajak: BNK48 Member
- Pruk Panich: Actor
