= Southwick railway station =

Railway station in West Sussex, England

Coordinates: 50°49′57″N 0°14′13″W

Southwick
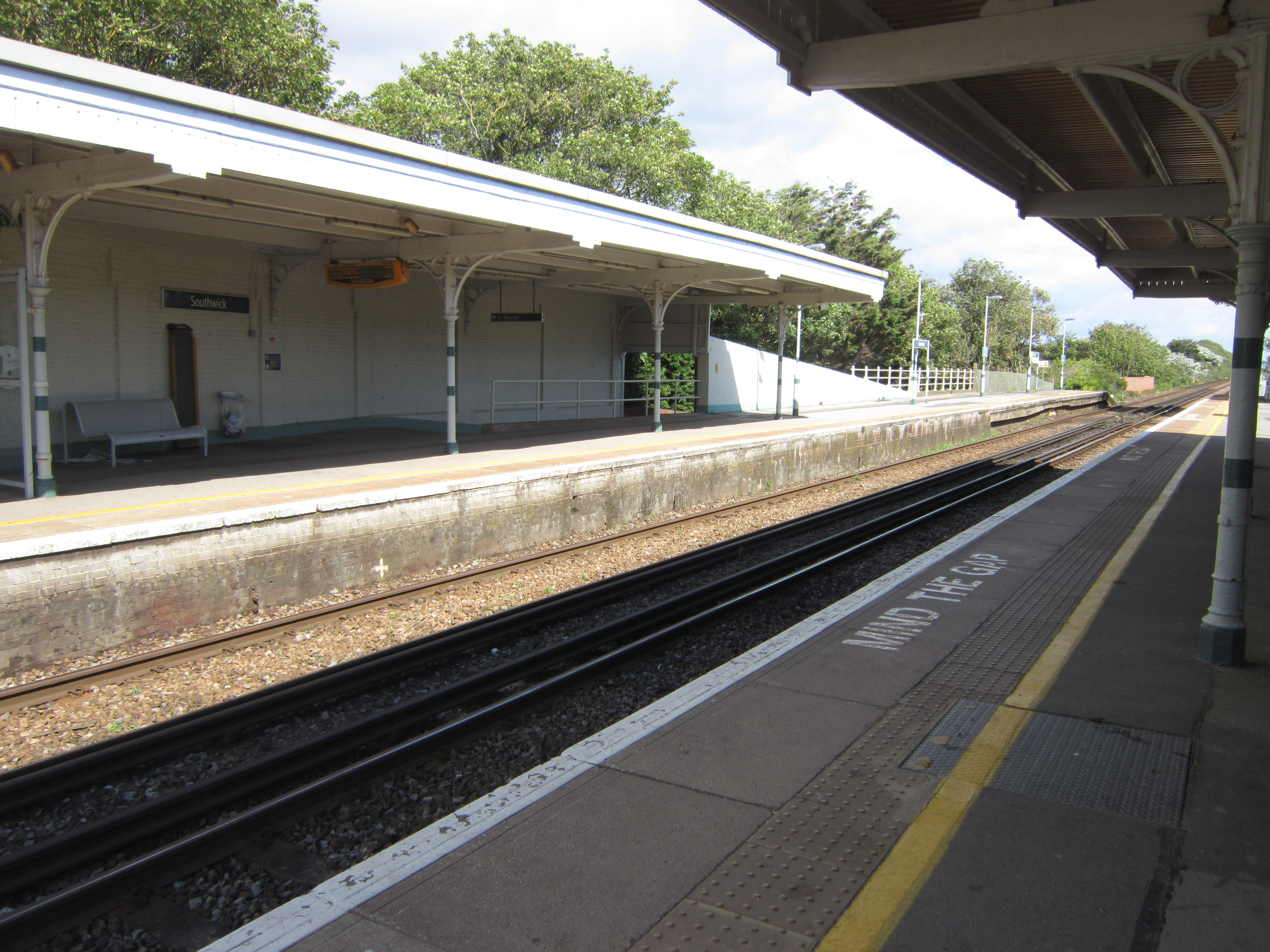

General information
- Location: Southwick, West Sussex, Adur; England
- Grid reference: TQ242051
- Managed by: Southern
- Platforms: 2

Other information
- Station code: SWK
- Classification: DfT category E

History
- Opened: 12 May 1840

Passengers
- 2020/21: ▼0.127 million
- 2021/22: ▲0.262 million
- 2022/23: ▲0.283 million
- 2023/24: ▲0.289 million
- 2024/25: ▲0.342 million
Location
Notes
- Passenger statistics from the Office of Rail and Road

Southwick railway station serves the town of Southwick in West Sussex, England. It is on the West Coastway Line, 4 miles 30 chains (7.0 km) from Brighton. It is operated by Southern. Its platforms are long enough for eight-coach trains.

== History ==
Southwick station was constructed by the London and Brighton Railway as one of the original stations on that railway's branchline between Brighton and Shoreham, opening 12 May 1840

== Operators ==
In 1846 the London and Brighton Railway became part of the London, Brighton & South Coast Railway, which continued until the grouping of 1923 and became part of the Southern Railway until nationalisation in 1948 when it became part of the Southern Region of British Railways.

== Services ==
All services at Southwick are operated by Southern using Class 377 EMUs.

The typical off-peak service in trains per hour is:

- 4 tph to Brighton
- 1 tph to Portsmouth & Southsea
- 1 tph to Chichester via Littlehampton
- 2 tph to Southampton Central

Additional services call at the station during the peak hours, including services to London Victoria and Littlehampton.

Preceding station	National Rail	Following station
Fishersgate or Portslade	Southern West Coastway Line	Shoreham-by-Sea
