= Libraries in Brighton and Hove =

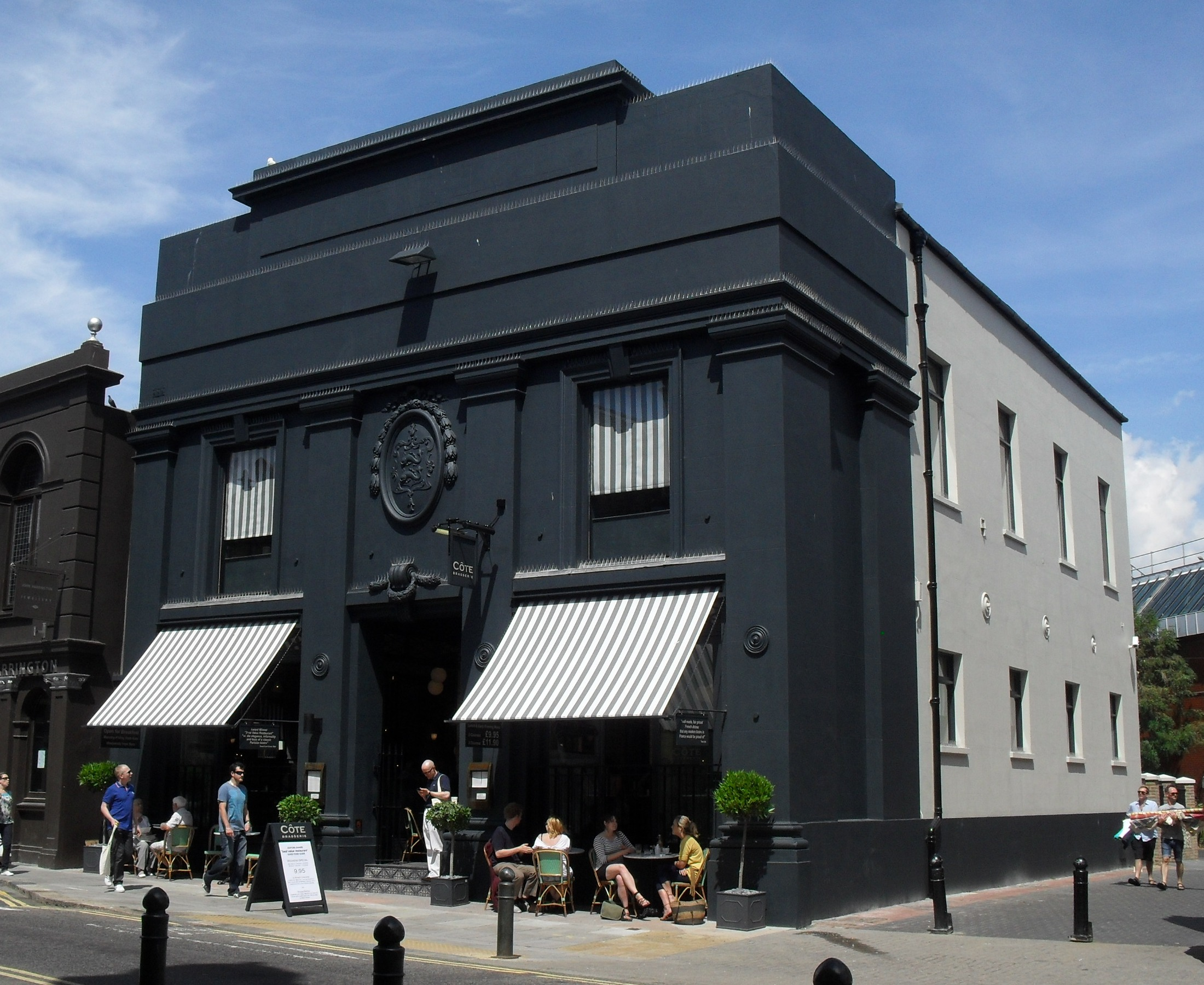
Past and present libraries in the city of Brighton and Hove include a separate music library, which occupied this former chapel from 1964 until 1999.

The English coastal city of Brighton and Hove has a long and varied history of libraries going back over 250 years. Subscription libraries were among the earliest buildings in the resort of Brighton, which developed in the late 18th century; by the 1780s these facilities, which were more like social clubs than conventional book-borrowing venues, were at the heart of the town's social scene. The Brighton Literary Society, its successor the Brighton Royal Literary and Scientific Institution and its rival the Sussex Scientific Institution between them established a "very fine collection" of publications by the mid-19th century, and these books were donated to the town when a public library was founded in 1871. Neighbouring Hove, originally a separate village, established its own public library in 1890.

Public libraries in the city are run by the Royal Pavilion, Museums and Libraries department of Brighton and Hove City Council. Branch libraries operate in the outlying villages and suburbs of Coldean, Hangleton, Hollingbury, Mile Oak, Moulsecoomb, Patcham, Portslade, Rottingdean, Saltdean, Westdene, Whitehawk and Woodingdean. The Brighton and Hove Toy Library is at the Whitehawk Library, rebuilt and reopened in 2011. The city council also operated a mobile library until 2013. Library membership is not limited to residents of the city, and gives borrowing rights at libraries throughout the city. Free internet access was introduced in 2001.

Nationally, libraries have experienced declining usage and funding cuts in recent decades, but Brighton and Hove's libraries have seen significant investment in the 21st century. Jubilee Library in central Brighton was opened in March 2005 to replace outdated split-site facilities nearby, which included a separate music library. It is England's sixth busiest: about 1 million people visited in 2009. New branch libraries have been built in the Coldean, Mile Oak, Whitehawk and Woodingdean suburbs, either as standalone buildings or as part of other community facilities. The library at Mile Oak is due to close in July 2023.

== Private and subscription libraries ==
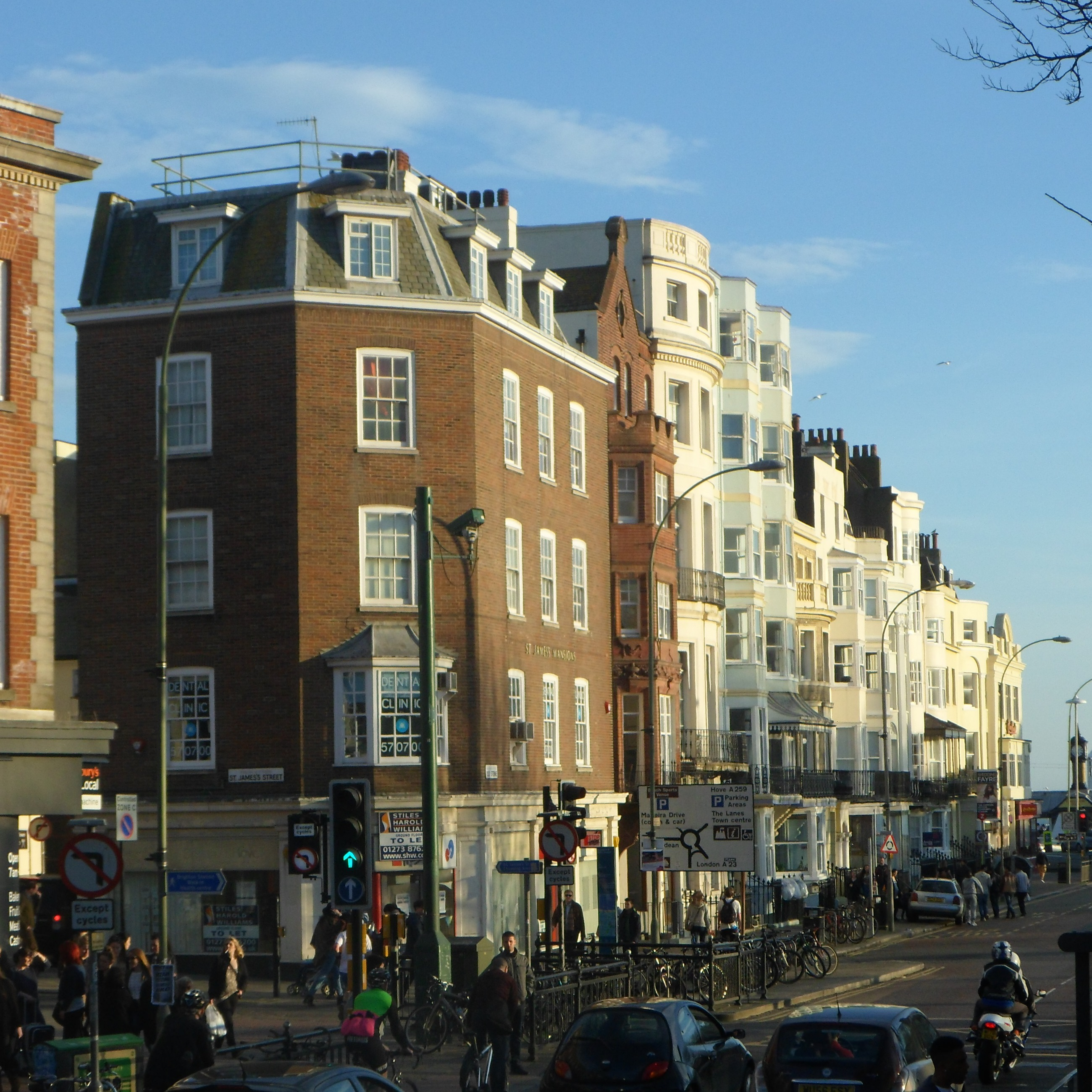
In this view of the east side of Old Steine, Baker's Library occupied the site of the brick building in the foreground, while the site of Thomas's Library is out of shot to the right.

Brighthelmstone on the Sussex coast in southeast England developed from a farming and fishing village into the fashionable leisure destination of Brighton from the mid-18th century. The town quickly attracted "all of the facilities that would have been expected" of a resort of that era. Among those were the proprietary libraries, also known as circulating libraries. In Brighton's earliest days as a resort, these privately owned facilities functioned as multi-purpose "informal meeting places" where visitors could "read, chat, listen to music, buy fripperies or gamble". Visitors would pay a subscription to become a member of the library for the season, and would write their names in a visitors' book. By doing so they would inform other visitors of their presence in Brighton, the length of their stay and where they were staying, facilitating social interaction. By the 1760s, Brighton's Master of Ceremonies also consulted the visitors' books from the various libraries to find out who was staying in the town and make contact with them. From the 1770s, when speculators built permanent theatres in the town, the libraries also sold tickets for performances, for which they received a commission.

The first true library in Brighton opened in or before 1760 on the Steine (now Old Steine), although a bookshop existed from 1759 on East Street. Baker's Library was the first building erected on the east side of the Steine: it stood on the south corner of the present St James's Street, where St James's Mansions stand now. Its proprietor was Mr E. Baker of Tunbridge Wells, another 18th-century resort town. (Note: 50.820977°N 0.136439°W) A small wooden building with a veranda and an attached rotunda for musicians to perform in, "it was more like a club" than a modern library: its other features included billiards tables. It was enlarged in 1806, necessitating the demolition of the original building.

By the end of the 1760s a second library had opened, also named after its proprietor. Originally called Thomas's Library after its proprietor R. Thomas, it was also known as Brighthelmston Circulating Library. Later, following a change of proprietor, it was known as Miss Widgett's Library (Note: Some sources give Woodgate's Library.) and was described by author Fanny Burney, a regular visitor to Brighton in the late 18th century: her journals made reference to "Widget [sic] the milliner and librarywoman". Also a timber building, it rose to two storeys and was fronted with a colonnade of Doric columns. Brighton's post office was here for about 20 years until 1803. Both libraries are shown in an engraving produced in 1778, (Note: A Perspective view of the Steyne at Brighthelmston, taken from the South End, 1778 (copper engraving), reproduced in Berry (2002), p.100.) in which Baker's Library stands alone on the east side of the open ground of the Steine. Thomas's Library was on the southwest side of the Steine near the present Royal York Hotel. (Note: 50.820623°N 0.138716°W) Neither library survived beyond the 1820s.

Development soon spread eastwards along the East Cliff, and one of the first buildings there was Donaldson and Wilkes' Library (1798). This later took the name Tuppen and Walkers' Library. It occupied a site between Charles Street and Manchester Street. (Note: 50.82042°N 0.135323°W) Donaldson became the Prince of Wales's official librarian and bookseller in 1806. Other contemporary libraries situated along the East Cliff were the New Steine Library, Pollard's on Marine Parade and Parsons' on the same road. The Royal Marine Library, meanwhile, faced the Chain Pier and kept telescopes for visitors to look out to sea. The focal point for these early libraries, though, remained the Steine, North Street and the square that linked them, Castle Square. In this area were the Castle Square Circulating Library; Eber's; Minerva; Folthorp's; Large's; Loder's; and Wright and Son's Royal Colonnade Library, Music Saloon and Reading Rooms. Loder's Library specialised in scientific publications and had 20,000 volumes, and Wright and Son stocked 8,000. It also kept national newspapers and British and foreign journals and periodicals. Raggett's Subscription House stood opposite Baker's Library on the north side of St James's Street and was a similar institution. Several of these libraries struggled financially in the 1780s, and some proprietors diversified into other activities to try to keep them open.

As Brighton grew beyond its historic centre in the 19th century, small subscription libraries (many of them short-lived) opened elsewhere: on East Street, Middle Street and Ship Street in The Lanes; St James's Street and High Street in the Kemptown area; Queen's Road and Gardner Street in the North Laine area near Brighton railway station; Preston Street, Norfolk Square, Western Road and King's Road on the West Cliff to the west of the Steine; and in the poor Carlton Hill area. Subscription libraries declined in popularity in the 20th century, but one survived until 1975 on Lewes Road. (Note: 50.83628°N 0.125497°W)

== Societies and institutions ==
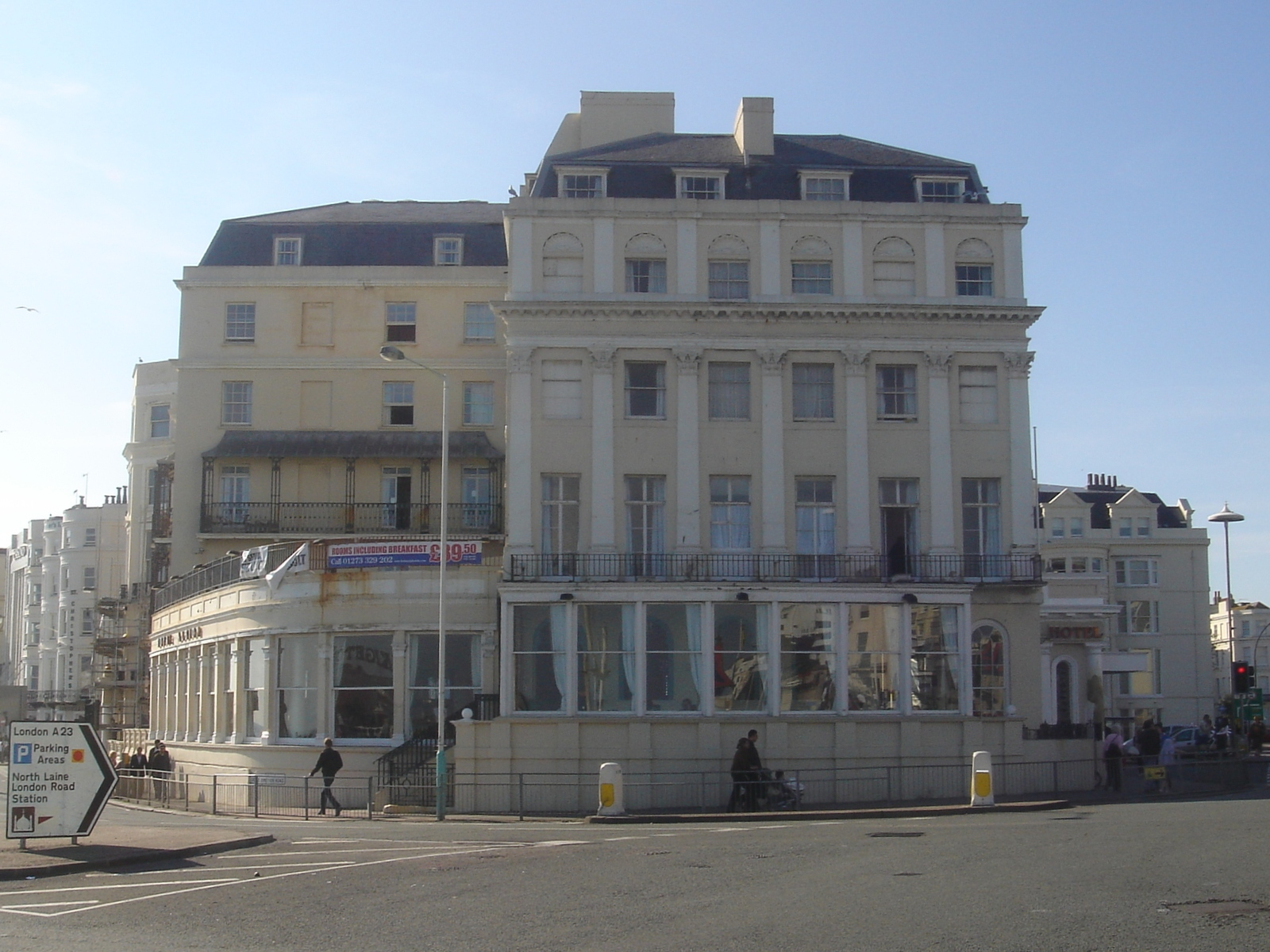
The Royal Albion Hotel housed the Brighton Royal Literary and Scientific Institution, whose collection of books was presented to Brighton Corporation when the first public library was set up.

In terms of the breadth and quality of its content, Brighton's "first important library" was that belonging to the Brighton Literary Society. It was founded c. 1812 by influential residents including George Wagner, brother of the Vicar of Brighton Henry Michell Wagner. The society gained new strength in the mid-1830s when John Cordy Burrows (later to be Mayor of Brighton and a Freeman of the Borough) and Dr Henry Turrell (proprietor of a "famous" early-19th-century private school in the town) joined. Around the same time, geologist and palaeontologist Gideon Mantell moved to Brighton and founded the Mantellian Institution, which also had its own library at South Parade (now part of Old Steine). Later known as the Sussex Scientific Institution and Mantellian Museum, and partly funded by George Wyndham, 3rd Earl of Egremont, its library contained mostly scientific books. The institute also offered lectures, a reading room and a museum dedicated to Mantell's research.

The Brighton Literary Society became defunct in the early 1840s but a new body was soon set up by its leading members. The Brighton Royal Literary and Scientific Institution was based in an annexe of the Royal Albion Hotel and had "a useful existence of 28 years". Its library collection gradually built up over this time: in 1842 it acquired the Mantellian Institution's collection, and it raised money to buy other works by holding popular lectures on scientific and historical subjects and by organising soirées and exhibitions at the Royal Pavilion. The Institution's extensive and "very fine collection" of books formed the basis of Brighton's first public library.

== Public libraries ==
An attempt to found a public library in Brighton after the passing of the Public Libraries Act 1850 failed, and no more was done until 1869. In that year, Brighton Corporation established the town's first public library in rooms at the Royal Pavilion. It was an adjunct to a small museum created in the Pavilion seven years earlier, which consisted of various artworks and objects collected by the Corporation since it was formed. This was only a temporary facility, though, because in 1871 the Corporation converted the former Royal Stables on Church Street near the Pavilion into a library, museum and art gallery. P.C. Lockwood, the Borough Surveyor, undertook the work; he maintained the opulent Moorish/Indo-Saracenic Revival style of architecture employed when the stables were built in 1804–08 by William Porden.

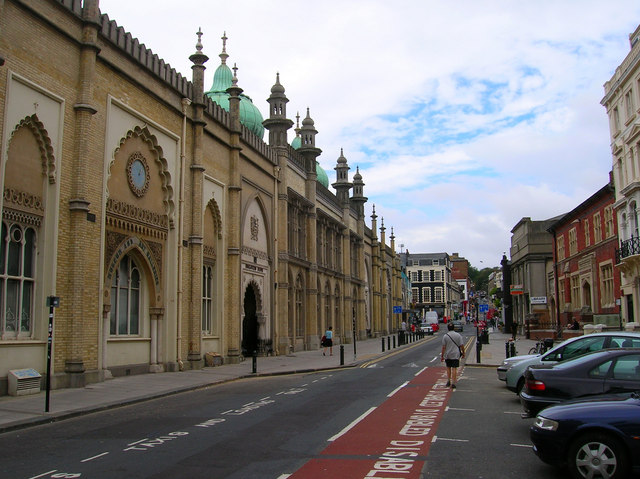
Brighton's main library occupied the buildings on the left. The grey building in the right background housed the music library.

The library's book collection grew rapidly through donations: many "local worthies [gave] or bequeathed their [personal] libraries to the town", perhaps motivated by the impressive building which now served as the library. More room was needed—although the library, museum and art gallery complex was large, the library was confined to two upper rooms—and in 1894 the building was altered to provide a large lending library and reading rooms on the ground floor and a reference library, containing rare material, at first-floor level. The extended library opened in November 1901.

Brighton Library thrived in the early 20th century as the Corporation received a series of donations and bequests of national importance. Wealthy Withdean resident L.M. Bloomfield's collection of 13,000 works included some of the earliest printed works in existence, ancient illuminated manuscripts and original editions of many books. In 1918 J.G. Lewis's vast collection of foreign works came to the library, and money from his estate was invested in a fund to be used for the purchase of further works. Another financial bequest in 1930 was to be reserved for the purchase of rare works "of special character". By the mid-20th century, Brighton's reference library contained "one of the richest collections in the whole country". In its present form, the "rare books and special collections" of Brighton & Hove Libraries runs to 45,000 volumes and is housed in Jubilee Library.

During World War II, Brighton Council converted the basement of the library, art gallery and museum complex into an air-raid shelter. Books were moved out of the library and taken to the Booth Museum of Natural History in suburban Prestonville, where they lay in piles on the floor until the war ended. In the postwar period, several schemes were put forward for a new purpose-built library. Many would have involved mixed-use developments: a combined car park, exhibition centre and library in 1964, a building incorporating a swimming pool in 1973, and in 1986 a commercial and residential development with a library set below an ice rink. The most likely site in the late 1980s and early 1990s became the Music Library building and the adjacent former courthouse, on the opposite side of Church Street to the main library, but funding was not forthcoming. Meanwhile, a large site behind Church Street, centred on Jubilee Street, had stood derelict since various building including the former Central National Voluntary School were demolished in 1971. Soon after Brighton and Hove Council was formed in 1997, it sought funding for a new library on this site through a private finance initiative (PFI). A contract to design and build what became Jubilee Library was signed in March 2001.

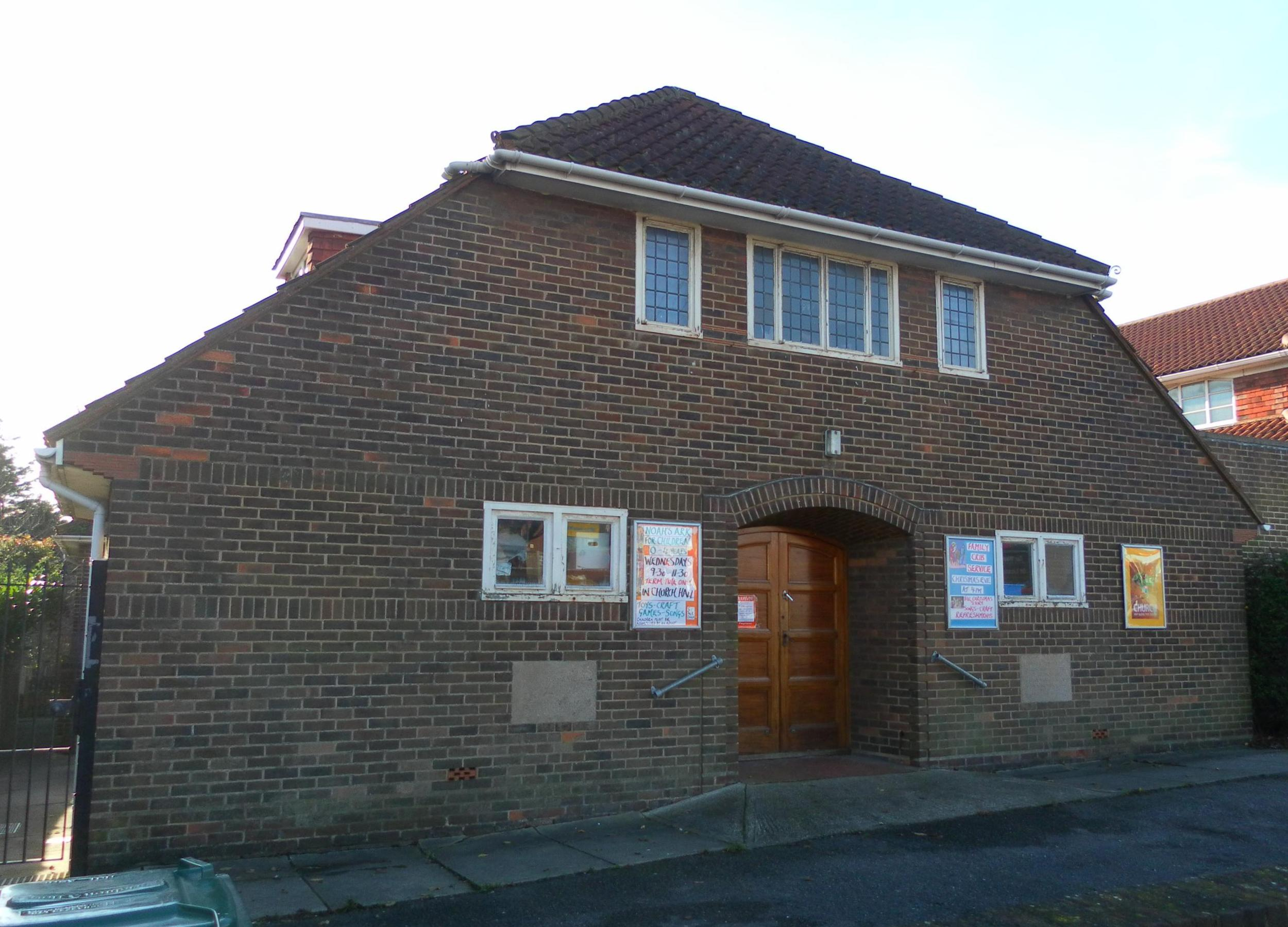
The church hall of Hounsom Memorial Church was used as a temporary library for the Hangleton estate.

The borough of Hove established a public library in 1890 in a house on Grand Avenue which was adapted for the purpose. By 1892 it stocked nearly 5,000 books and a range of newspapers in its "newsroom". The library moved to another house in nearby Third Avenue in 1900. Three years later, Andrew Carnegie's endowment of £10,000 allowed the borough to provide a permanent library in purpose-built premises. Architects Percy Robinson and W. Alban Jones won the commission in competition.

Branch libraries were established from the 1930s onwards in the suburbs and housing estates around Hove and Brighton. In many cases temporary facilities were used at first: for example, a shop was used in Woodingdean, a temporary facility was set up in Whitehawk during its rapid development in the 1930s, and a church hall in Hangleton doubled as a library. Most permanent libraries date from the 1960s and 1970s: examples include Portslade (1961), Hangleton (1962), Moulsecoomb and Westdene (both 1964). Buildings of that vintage in Coldean, Whitehawk and Woodingdean have in turn been replaced by new mixed-use buildings in the 21st century. Not all libraries opened in the postwar era were purpose-built. Hollingbury's library occupies a former pub which was in turn converted out of wartime prefabs; the 18th-century vicarage in Rottingdean became the village's library in the 1950s; and nearby Saltdean's library occupies part of Saltdean Lido. A branch library was also planned for the northeast of Hove, near St Ann's Well Gardens, in the 1960s. A plan submitted in 1962 proposed a library with residential accommodation above, next to St Thomas's Church on Davigdor Road. The building would have encroached on St Ann's Well Gardens, and public opposition to this meant the Davigdor Branch never went ahead.

Brighton Library, Hove Library and all the branch libraries were run by the respective borough councils until 1 April 1974, when they came under the control of East Sussex County Council and were run from Lewes, the county town. Exactly 23 years later, local control was regained when Brighton and Hove Council, the new entity in charge of the unitary authority of Brighton and Hove, took charge.

== Main public libraries ==
=== Overview and statistics ===
Brighton & Hove Libraries, the city's library service, is provided by the city council under the terms of the Public Libraries and Museums Act 1964. Jubilee Library is the main facility in central Brighton; there is another central library in Hove; and 12 "community libraries" (branch libraries) are located in suburban areas. Delivery services to housebound people, residential homes and sheltered accommodation are also offered. Three of the city's libraries are in standalone buildings which are not shared with any other facilities or users. One of these is the Grade II-listed Hove Library: in late 2015, it was calculated that more than £1.2 million would be needed in the next five years for running costs and maintenance. As a result, the city council announced a proposal to close the library and move its books and other facilities to an extended Hove Museum and Art Gallery.

According to the city council, Jubilee Library "delivers around 50% of the total library services for the city". By 2014, it attracted more than a million visitors per year, making it the busiest library in the South East England region and the second busiest in the country. In the 2014/15 financial year it dropped to fifth place nationally with just over 952,000 visits. Statistics measured in late 2014 state that the city's libraries were used by 47% of residents in the last year—a much higher proportion than nationally (35%).

Library service revenue in the 2013/2014 financial year was £643,797 and was generated from various sources: fines for overdue books, sales of surplus stock, letting space and hiring equipment to other organisations, and grants.

=== Brighton (Jubilee) ===
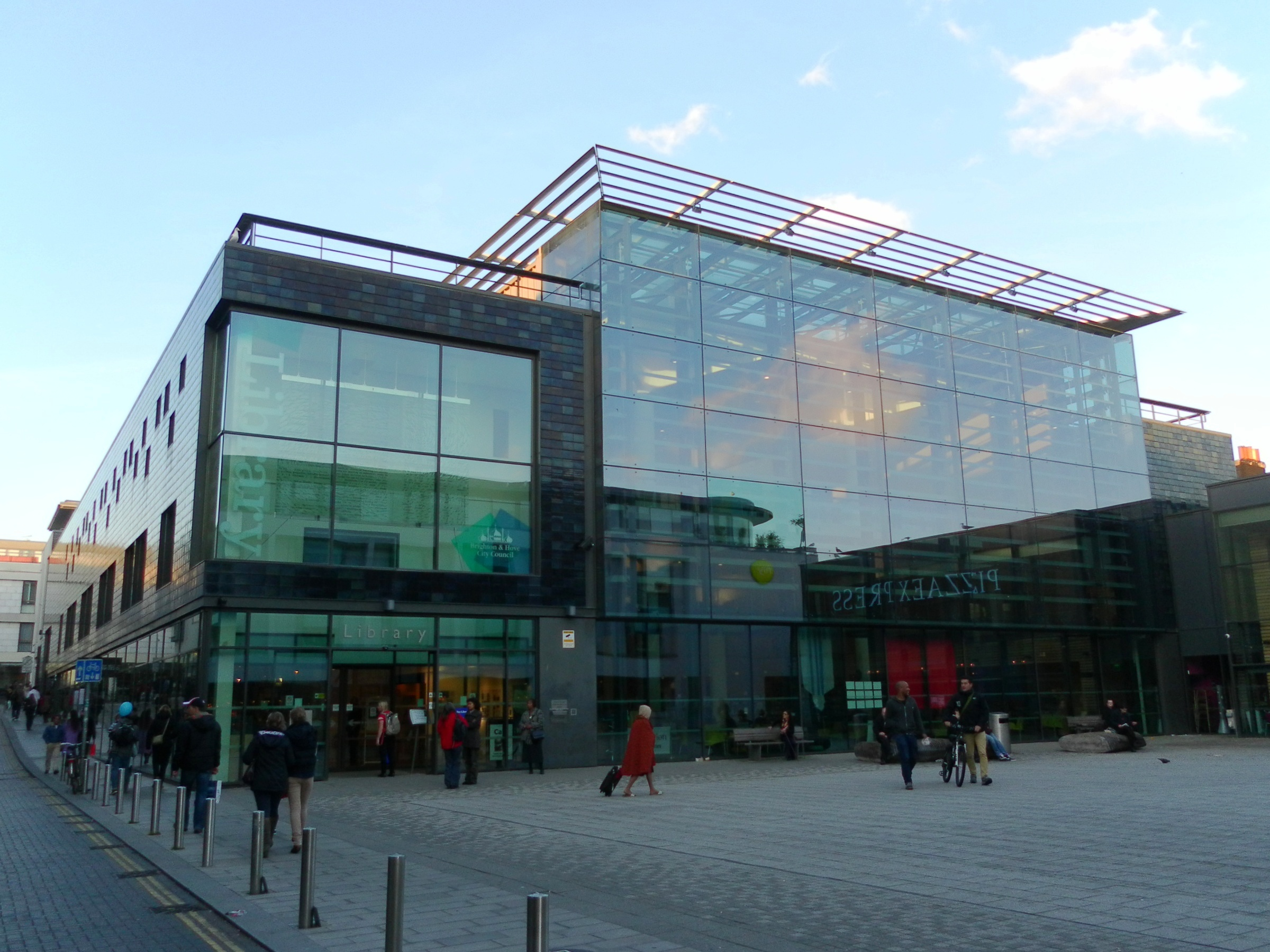
Jubilee Library (2005) is Brighton's central library.

Jubilee Library (Note: 50.8251°N 0.138364°W) is the centrepiece of the Jubilee Square development in the North Laine, an early-21st-century scheme which regenerated a "desolate space" of temporary car parks and wasteland. Construction started in November 2002 and lasted for two years, and the library was opened to the public on 3 March 2005. The Princess Royal officially opened it 16 days earlier. The building cost £14 million, which was in line with its budget. The money was raised through a private finance initiative (PFI), which was authorised in May 1998. The contract was won by Mill Group Consortium jointly with Norwich Union PPPF in November 2000. Architecture firms Bennetts Associates and LCE Architects, and construction firm Rok plc, were chosen to build the library.

The building was designed in line with sustainable principles and has several distinctive architectural features. "Carefully wrought but nonetheless striking", the library is formed of a "slightly austere translucent glass box" with an angled brise soleil and tiled side walls. The "lofty, noble" interior is open-plan, broken up only by white-painted splayed concrete columns. The interior is lit by a two-storey louvre which forms the transition between the glazed façade and the interior. The extensive use of solar and wind power, natural air circulation, rainwater harvesting and internal lighting which automatically adjusts to the light conditions make it "one of the most energy efficient public buildings in the country".

=== Hove ===
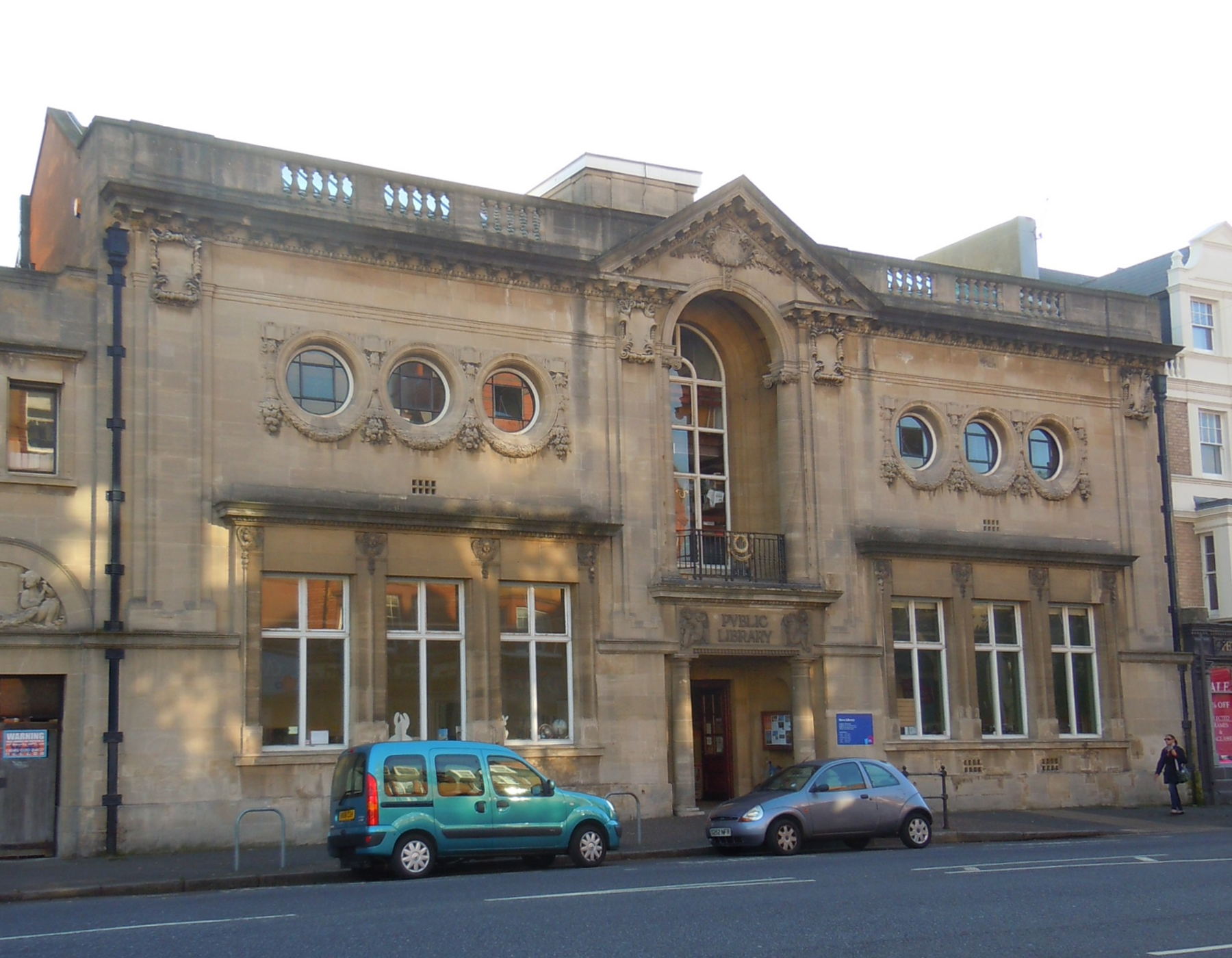
Hove Library opened in 1908.

The Hove Commissioners formed a committee to investigate the establishment of a "Free Public Library" for the growing town. Residents had the chance to vote on the matter in March 1891, and the majority supported the proposal. William Willett offered space at 11 Grand Avenue, and a reading room and reference library was established later that year. Books and other works were donated by wealthy residents. The library moved to 22 Third Avenue in June 1901, but two years later Andrew Carnegie donated £10,000 "to erect a free Public Library building for Hove, if the Free Public Libraries Act be adopted". The site chosen for the library (Note: 50.828355°N 0.177135°W) was on Church Road near St Andrew's Church and was occupied by a depot. The buildings were cleared in 1905 and a competition was held to find a suitable design for the library. Of the 71 entries, ten were shortlisted and were scrutinised by RIBA president John Belcher. The design submitted by Percy Robinson and W. Alban Jones of Leeds was the winner, the plans were signed off by the council in October 1906, and the foundation stone was laid on 10 June 1907 by the Mayor of Hove. The new library was opened by Margaret Elizabeth Villiers, Countess of Jersey, on 8 July 1908. F.G. Minter was the building contractor, and construction cost £13,500. The "highly inventive" Doulting stone building has two storeys and has elements of the Edwardian Baroque and Renaissance Revival styles. An "impressive glass dome" lights the interior. Lost features of the building include a cupola (removed as structurally unsound in 1967), a roof garden and a flagpole. The library was Grade II-listed in November 1992.

== Branch libraries ==
Name	Image	Location	Notes	Refs
Coldean Library		Library Court, Beatty Avenue, Coldean; 50.863515°N 0.113034°W	The postwar Coldean estate in northeast Brighton lacked a library until 1975; on 8 May that year, a branch library opened on Beatty Avenue. A new facility, twice as large, opened on the site in June 2008. It cost £700,000 and occupies the ground floor of a block of housing association flats.	
Hangleton Library		West Way, Hangleton; 50.845501°N 0.195581°W	Branch libraries on this housing estate in northern Hove operated at the Hounsom Memorial Church Hall (1945–62) and The Knoll School (closed 1951). After many delays, T.R. Humble's designs (made in 1958–59) for a combined library and sheltered housing building were approved, and the new library opened on 10 January 1962. A ceremonial opening by Queen Elizabeth II and Prince Philip followed in July. The building was flooded in October 2011 and did not reopen until December.	
Hollingbury Library		Carden Hill, Hollingbury; 50.86078°N 0.128263°W	The library dates from April 1962 but the building is 12 years older: it originally served as the Hollingbury estate's first pub. The Whitbread company placed two prefabricated buildings together and converted them into the County Oak pub on a temporary basis until a permanent building was put up behind it.	
Mile Oak Library		Chalky Road, Mile Oak; 50.851177°N 0.224259°W	Residents of this housing estate north of Portslade had to make do with "a few boxes of books in the community centre" until Portslade Community College (now Portslade Aldridge Community Academy) opened a joint school and public library on its campus in May 1975. It was redeveloped in 2014 and reopened in larger premises after temporarily moving to the Academy's sports centre. The city council announced in June 2023 that the library would close on 21 July 2023.	
Moulsecoomb Library		The Highway, Moulsecoomb; 50.846977°N 0.115829°W	The first library facility serving the Moulsecoomb estate opened in 1929 in Moulsecoomb Place. One of the lodges belonging to that country house was demolished to make way for the single-storey purpose-built library which replaced the temporary facilities from 13 March 1964. The building was redeveloped in September 2009.	
Patcham Library		Ladies' Mile Road, Patcham; 50.863242°N 0.143957°W	Until 1928 Patcham was administratively part of East Sussex, and its council administered library facilities in the suburb until 1933. A permanent branch library opened in that year, and it served for 70 years until a new combined community centre and PFI-funded library opened next to Patcham High School.	
Portslade Library		Old Shoreham Road, Portslade; 50.838193°N 0.211535°W	The creation of Portslade's permanent library was announced in October 1961 and the "futuristic" £20,000 building, whose design "led it to be compared to Sputnik", opened in November 1964. Situated below street level on a small site, it could only be reached by a steep flight of steps until disabled access was created through the staff quarters in the late 20th century.	
Rottingdean Library		The Green, Rottingdean; 50.805875°N 0.057319°W	The Grange is a Grade II-listed building of 1792, originally the vicarage of St Margaret's Church, later a school and (in the early 20th century) the home of artist Sir William Nicholson. Edwin Lutyens redesigned it for a subsequent owner. Since the 1950s it has housed the village's public library, a local history museum and an art gallery.	
Saltdean Library		Saltdean Park Road, Saltdean; 50.801744°N 0.041966°W	Saltdean's library is part of the Grade II*-listed Saltdean Lido, designed by R.W.H. Jones in the Art Deco/Moderne style in 1937. Brighton Borough Council bought and redeveloped the lido in 1964, adding a community centre, clinic and two-storey library (opened in January 1965) at the rear.	
Westdene Library		Bankside, Westdene; 50.85991°N 0.162416°W	The public library on this 1950s housing estate northwest of Brighton was opened on 13 May 1964 by the Mayor of Brighton Stanley Deason.	
Whitehawk Library		Whitehawk Road, Whitehawk; 50.825661°N 0.107385°W	Library facilities were provided in 1934 and 1969 (a temporary replacement), then a permanent building was provided from 9 November 1973. This in turn closed on 30 July 2011; the Whitehawk Inn pub and the mobile library provided a temporary library service until the new Whitehawk Community Hub, a mixed-use building, opened exactly a month later.	
Woodingdean Library		Warren Way, Woodingdean; 50.835704°N 0.078329°W	The first library facility on this 20th-century estate was provided from 2 May 1940 in a shop unit at 48 Warren Road. (Note: 50.835983°N 0.079215°W) Between c. 1952 and 1959 its home was the now demolished Warren Farm School complex; but on 10 July 1959 a new building (click for image) was provided on the south side of Warren Road. This temporary facility was demolished in 2013 and work began on its replacement in the autumn of that year. Author Lynne Truss opened the new library, which is twice the size and incorporates a new medical centre, in June 2014.	

== Mobile library ==
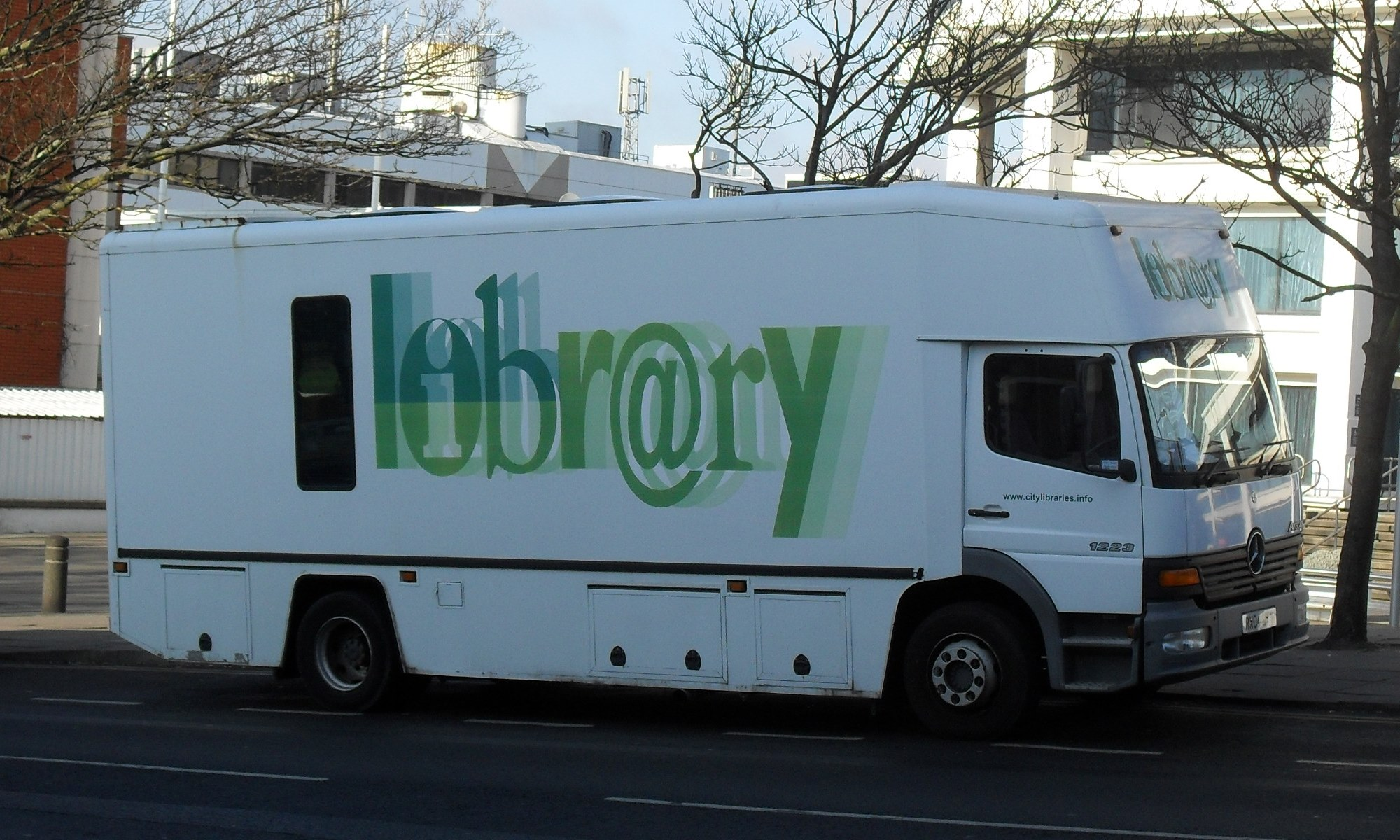
The mobile library service (vehicle pictured in 2010) ceased in 2013.

For many years, the council operated a mobile library service. A new vehicle was bought in 2004, and in 2010 it was reported that a replacement would be brought into service the following year. About 800 people used the service annually. The council announced it was withdrawing its funding in January 2013, and the vehicle ran for the last time on 27 April 2013. "A personalised door-to-door delivery service" replaced it at a cost of £37,000 per year, compared to £84,000 for the mobile library. A proposal to stop the service had been made in December 2011, but two months later more funding was secured. Another extension was granted in September 2012, but the service ceased in 2013. Nearly 24,000 users were recorded in the 2012/2013 financial year, its final full year of operation.

A small-scale mobile library began operating in July 2013. The Quaker Mobile Library Brighton, run by the Quaker Homeless Action group, is aimed at homeless people and "operate[s] out of suitcases that have shelves built into them" rather than using a vehicle.

== Music libraries ==
Brighton had a separate music library from 1964 until 1999. It occupied a Classical-style building (Note: 50.82407°N 0.138397°W) which dated from 1825. Situated on the north side of Church Street opposite the old library and art gallery complex, it had a varied history. Originally the Trinity Independent Presbyterian Chapel (or "Mr Faithfull's Chapel"), it closed c. 1896 and became successively a bazaar, a warehouse and the Brighton and Hove General Gas Company's showroom. After its closure in 1999, the Local Studies section of the library moved in when the main library collection was moved out of the old building pending the opening of Jubilee Library. It stood empty from 2003 until 2010, when it became a French restaurant. Hove had a separate music library for a time as well: it was opened on 16 March 1966 by the tenor Joseph Ward, and moved to 176 Church Road (Note: 50.828291°N 0.176503°W) (close to the main library, which is at 182–186 Church Road) 18 months later. In December 1983, the council decided to close the building and integrate the music collection into the main library. It was sold for £80,000 in 1985 and passed into commercial use.

== See also ==
- List of libraries in the United Kingdom

== Bibliography ==
- Antram, Nicholas; Morrice, Richard (2008). Brighton and Hove. Pevsner Architectural Guides. London: Yale University Press. ISBN 978-0-300-12661-7.
- Antram, Nicholas; Pevsner, Nikolaus (2013). Sussex: East with Brighton and Hove. The Buildings of England. London: Yale University Press. ISBN 978-0-300-18473-0.
- Berry, Sue (2002). "Myth and Reality in the Representation of Resorts: Brighton and the Emergence of the "Prince and Fishing Village" Myth 1770–1824". Sussex Archaeological Collections. 140. Lewes: Sussex Archaeological Society: 97–112. doi:10.5284/1086047.
- Berry, Sue (2005). Georgian Brighton. Chichester: Phillimore & Co. Ltd. ISBN 1-86077-342-7.
- Brighton Polytechnic. School of Architecture and Interior Design (1987). A Guide to the Buildings of Brighton. Macclesfield: McMillan Martin. ISBN 1-869-86503-0.
- Collis, Rose (2010). The New Encyclopaedia of Brighton. (based on the original by Tim Carder) (1st ed.). Brighton: Brighton & Hove Libraries. ISBN 978-0-9564664-0-2.
- Dale, Antony (1950). The History and Architecture of Brighton. Brighton: Bredin & Heginbothom Ltd.
- Dale, Antony (1986) [1951]. About Brighton: A Guide to the Buildings and Byways of Brighton and Hove (2nd Revised ed.). Brighton: The Regency Society of Brighton and Hove.
- Middleton, Judy (1979). A History of Hove. Chichester: Phillimore & Co. ISBN 0-85033-325-3.
- Middleton, Judy (2002). The Encyclopaedia of Hove & Portslade. Brighton: Brighton & Hove Libraries.
- Musgrave, Clifford (1981). Life in Brighton. Rochester: Rochester Press. ISBN 0-571-09285-3.
