= Jubilee Library, Brighton =

Public library in Brighton and Hove, UK

Jubilee Library
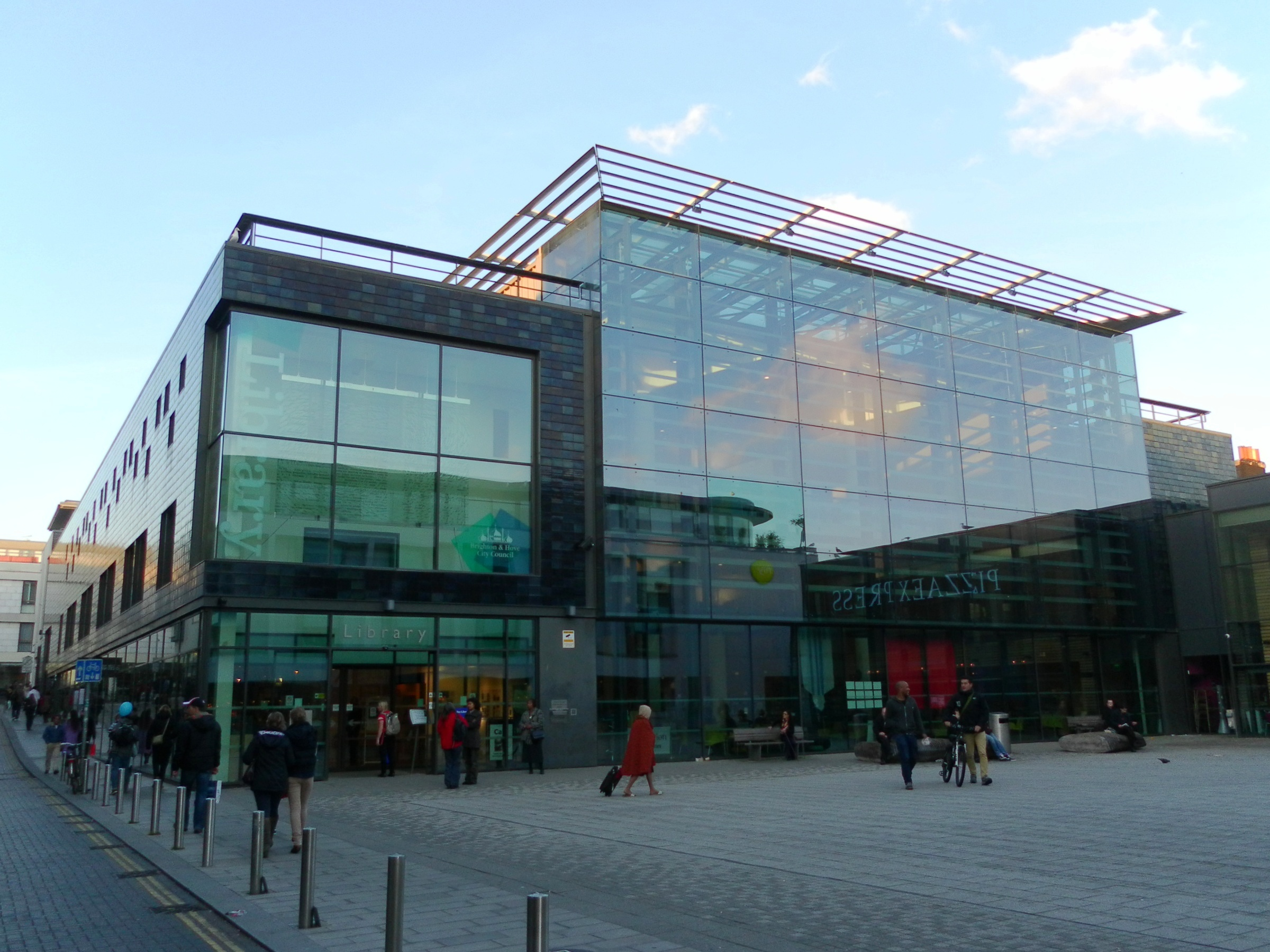
- The library from the southwest
- 50.8252°N 0.1383°W
- Location: Jubilee Square, Brighton, United Kingdom
- Type: Public library
- Established: 2005
- Branch of: Brighton & Hove Libraries

Collection
- Size: 176,000 (standard); 45,000 (Rare Books collection)

Access and use
- Access requirements: None
- Population served: 283,870

Other information
- Director: Sally McMahon (Head of Libraries)
- Website: Jubilee Library Home Page

The Jubilee Library is the largest public library in the English city of Brighton and Hove. The Jubilee Library forms part of the Jubilee Square development in central Brighton, a £50 million endeavour to regenerate a 40-year-old brownfield site. Opened in 2005 by the Princess Royal, the library has won several architectural design awards, and was described as "a triumph" by the Pevsner Architectural Guides. In terms of the number of daily visitors (along with daily book loans/purchases), the library is one of the busiest in England.

The library brought together facilities previously housed in separate sites. Several pieces of art were commissioned for the building and its environment. The building has been described as one of the most energy-efficient structures in England – its carbon footprint is half that of a traditional public building of its comparable size, and natural energy is used throughout.

== History ==
Prior to the Jubilee Library, Brighton Reference Library stood on Church Street, with a musical library and a studying library at other locations.

From the 1960s onwards several plans were made and discussed for a new purpose-built-library, often in conjunction with other developments such as a combined car park and exhibition centre. In 1964, a building incorporating a swimming pool was built. In 1973, and in 1986 two sets of buildings were constructed: a mixed-use commercial and residential development with a library set below an ice rink. The most likely site in the late 1980s and early 1990s became the Music Library building and the adjacent former courthouse, on the opposite side of Church Street to the main library, but funding was not forthcoming.

Brighton Reference Library on Church Street closed in 1999 after roughly a century of its opening, with a new temporary library opening in a 1960s former office building, Vantage Point. It was further from the city centre, but no other building was available at short notice that could hold all the stock. The Music Library, which had occupied a building on Church Street since 1964, moved there at the same time; the Local Studies collection was then put in the Church Street building until 2003. Vantage Point was open to the public until closing its doors on 30 October 2004.

=== The Jubilee Street site ===
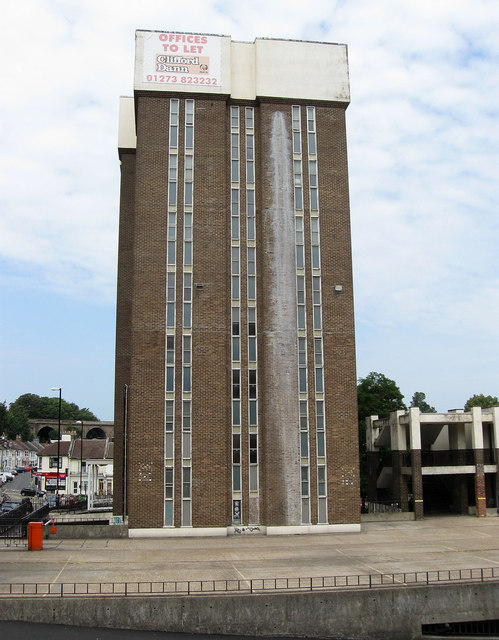
Vantage Point, an office block in the New England Quarter, was used as a temporary library while Jubilee Library was being built.

A large site behind Church Street, centred on Jubilee Street, had stood derelict since the former Central National Voluntary School was demolished in 1971, along with other buildings which included some old agricultural buildings behind the Waggon and Horses pub. These, and the houses, workshops and other small buildings surrounding it, were accessed by a narrow lane whose site is now Jubilee Mews. The first suggestion that a central library should be built on this land was made in 1991.

Brighton and Hove became a joint unitary authority in 1997, and the newly constituted Brighton & Hove Council applied for funding for a new library through a private finance initiative (PFI). The Government agreed to this in May 1998, and in January 1999 the council issued an invitation to tender for bidders for the contract to design and build the new library and associated buildings on the 4.3-acre (1.7 ha) site. In December 1999, three bids were shortlisted from those submitted, and in November 2000 property and infrastructure finance company Mill Group Consortium's joint bid with Norwich Union PPPF was successful in winning the PFI contract. At the same time, Bennetts Associates and Brighton-based architects LCE Architects (Lomax Cassidy & Edwards) won the design contract, and construction firm Rok plc were chosen to build the library. The contract was signed on 31 March 2001.

The new library was intended to be the focus of a large-scale mixed-use development which involved the creation of a new pedestrianised piazza and the reinstatement as a through route of Jubilee Street, severed when the surrounding derelict land became a makeshift car park. (The street was laid out in the 1840s across Jubilee Field, so named when a wealthy resident's free party for the town's poor people to celebrate George III's Jubilee in 1809 brought in so many people that they spilled out of the Royal Pavilion stables and on to the adjacent field.) The name Jubilee Library was chosen to reflect this; a councillor's suggestion of Thabo Mbeki Library, in reference to the then incumbent South African President's period of study at the University of Sussex, was rejected.

=== Opening ===
Work on the £14 million building started in November 2002 and finished on 29 November 2004, in line with its schedule and budget. Staff and stock transferred to the new library and on 15 February 2005 The Princess Royal officially opened it. The public opening was on 3 March 2005—that year's World Book Day. It was immediately popular with residents and visitors: 2,000 people entered the building in its first two hours, and it became so crowded that the doors had to be closed temporarily and the toilets stopped flushing from overuse. Within two weeks, 3,000 new members joined, and numbers were still high six months later: about 16,500 joiners were recorded in that time. Visitor and loan numbers by November 2005 greatly exceeded the average numbers during the Vantage Point period: about 358,000 visits were recorded and 336,000 items were lent. By the end of its first year, the library had 810,000 visits and 23,000 new members. Queen Elizabeth II visited the library on her full-day tour of the city in March 2007.

By January 2008, Jubilee Library was the fifth most visited public library in England, behind only Birmingham Central Library, Manchester Central Library, Croydon Central Library and the Norfolk & Norwich Millennium Library—all of which serve much larger regional populations. In 2007, 900,000 visits were recorded and lent about 700,000 items; only three English libraries issued more in that time. The library started to open seven days a week in April 2008, and in 2009 annual visits exceeded 970,000. By 2014 visits had exceeded one million, making it the busiest library in the South East England region and the second busiest in the country, subsequently, the 2014/15 financial year saw a decline to fifth place nationally with just over 952,000 visits.

Several artworks were commissioned for the library and its environs in 2005. By the end of that year, the Jubilee Square development was largely complete. Jubilee Street was reopened to traffic in December, three months after £30 million was spent on new shops, offices and restaurants on its west side; and a PizzaExpress restaurant was built on the east side of the square. Two years later, the south side of the square was finished when a hotel opened opposite the library.

== Architecture ==
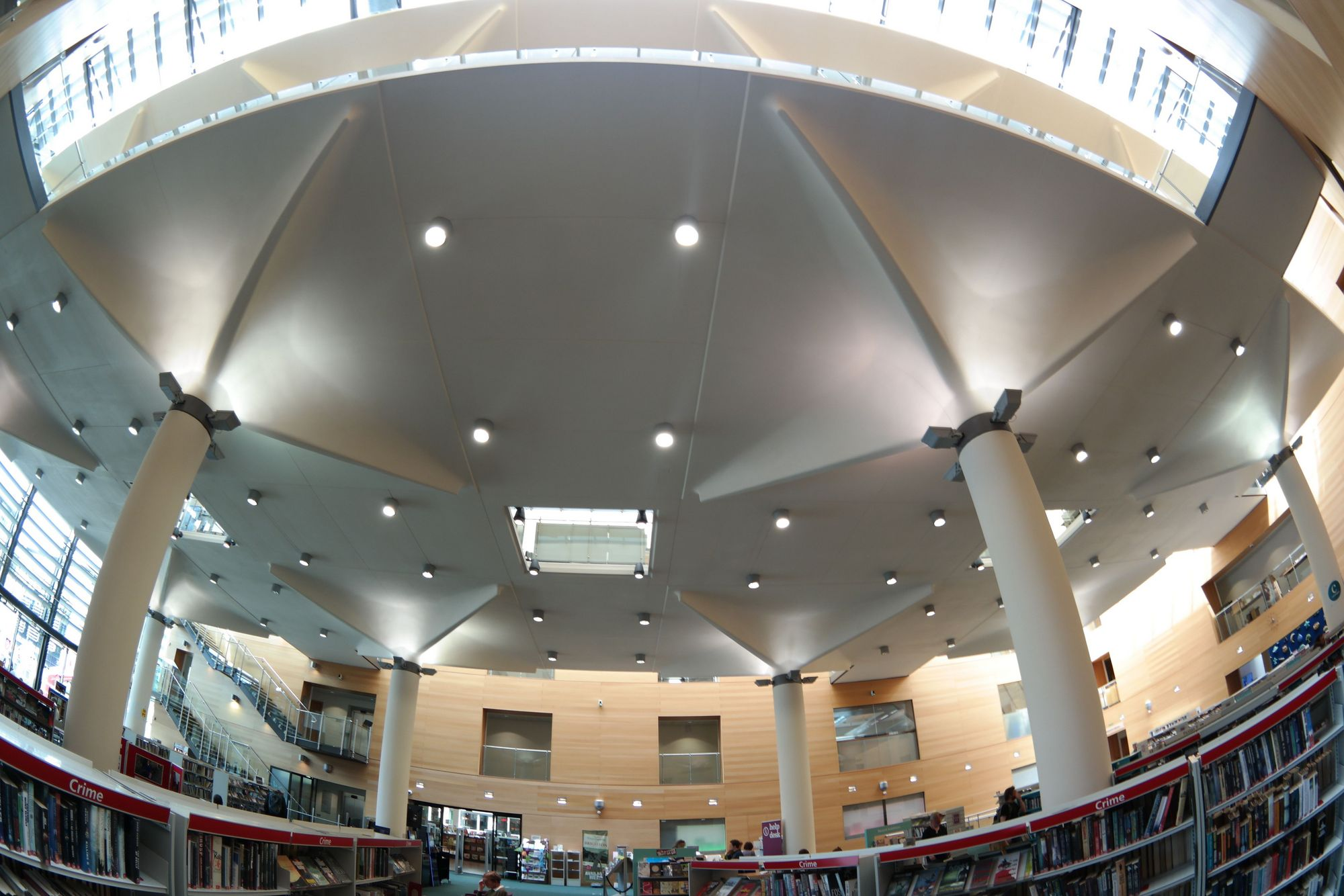
A view of the library's spacious interior, with "floating" first floor.

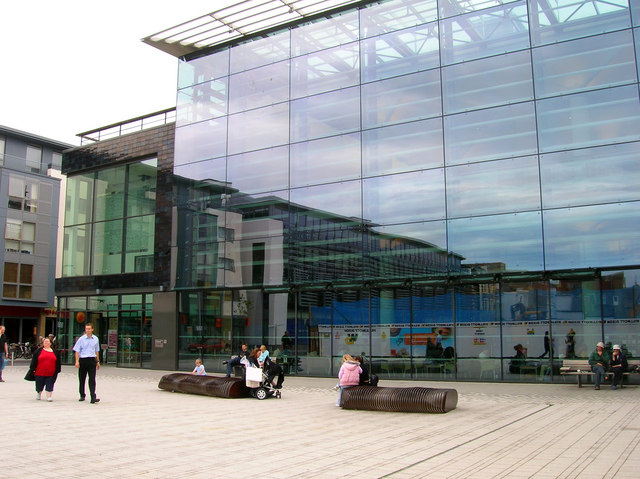
The glass façade faces south on to Jubilee Square. The timber and glass benches in front were one of three artworks commissioned for the library.

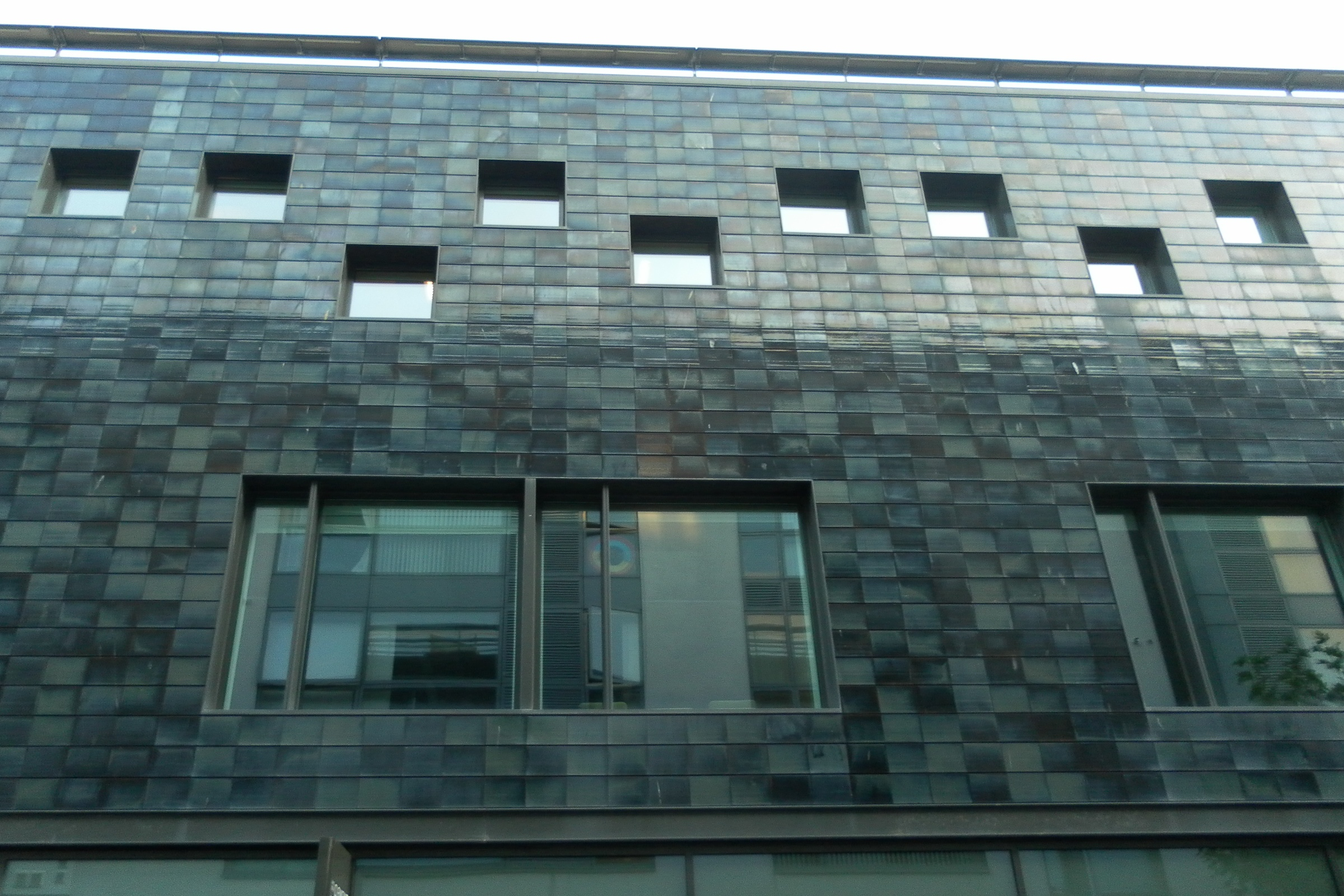
The west façade has imitation mathematical tiles and windows at irregular intervals.

Jubilee Library has been widely praised for its design, use of materials and sustainability. It has been called "a rare example of first-class design emanating from the controversial Private Finance Initiative", "a triumph ... carefully wrought but nonetheless striking", "crisp, simple ... and pack[ing] a surprising architectural punch" and "a stunning piece of architecture that enhances its location". The scheme architects were Bennetts Associates and Brighton firm LCE Architects (Lomax Cassidy & Edwards); the lead architects of the respective firms have a long association.

The south-facing entrance is fully glazed and creates a smooth transition from the square to the interior. To the east, a "slightly austere translucent glass box" projects slightly and is topped by an angled brise soleil. Further to the east, the wing containing staff and conference rooms is faced with glazed blue tiles which imitate mathematical tiles—an 18th-century design element used frequently in Brighton but rarely found elsewhere. The west side is the only other clearly visible elevation (it faces Jubilee Street); the ground floor is continuously glazed, and above this layers of blue and green imitation mathematical tiles are interspersed with windows at irregular intervals. The tiles were glazed by hand in the local area. Architecture critic Hugh Pearman praised their use "at a time when every other building in the western world seems to have an off-the-peg terracotta skin".

The interior has been described as "cathedral-like", "lofty [and] noble". Comparisons have been made between it and the mid 19th-century works of French architect Henri Labrouste, such as the Sainte-Geneviève Library and the Bibliothèque nationale de France, and also the work of Frank Lloyd Wright. The two-storey forum-style space is interspersed with large white-painted concrete columns splayed at the top. Natural light comes in through the south-facing glass front and is directed by a giant screen in the form of a louvre which, along with steel and glass passageways, divide the outer glass wall from the interior. These passages form a u-shaped surround at first-floor level, behind which are staff rooms, stock rooms, conference facilities and other administrative functions. They are partly lined with beech panels.

The main artwork is visible through a two-storey window above the main entrance. Uncover–Discover by Georgia Russell consists of large filigree-style paper letters suspended from the ceiling. Inside the children's section is the Wall of a Thousand Stories by Kate Malone—a series of multicoloured ceramic plaques. Another art installation, Liquidus, also has a functional role: it is a pair of "primeval" timber and glass benches which are lit from beneath after dark. Caroline Barton designed the benches, which are in the square in front of the entrance.

== Sustainability ==
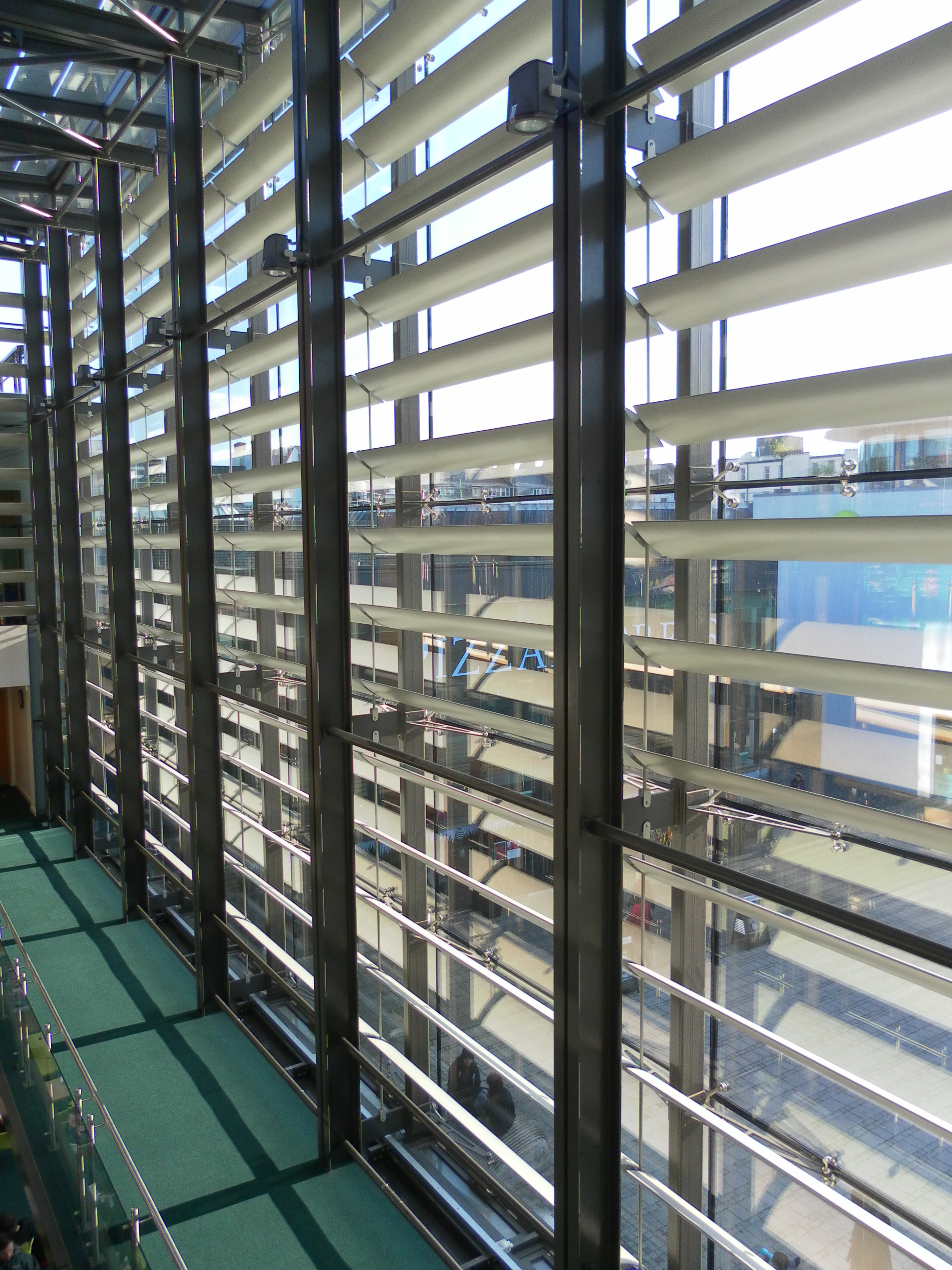
The interior is lit through this glazed wall with a floor-to-ceiling louvre-style screen.

The library is a 21st-century building designed with sustainable principles: Brighton & Hove City Council describes it as "one of the most energy efficient public buildings in the country", and the Building Research Establishment gave its sustainable features an "excellent" grade in 2002 during the construction phase. Solar and wind energy are used to heat and cool the building naturally, except during extremes of temperature. Air is taken in from outside, circulates through the building through spaces in the walls and under the heat-absorbing floor, and is pushed out through roof vents. The architects planned three revolving funnels to let the air out and "dramatise" the roofline, but this feature was dropped before construction. Rainwater is harvested from the roof, collected in a 10,000-litre (2,600 US gal) tank and used in the toilets. Internal lighting automatically adjusts to the conditions.

== Awards ==
In 2005, the year it opened, Jubilee Library won ten awards. It came top in the partnership and delegates' choice categories in the Public Libraries Group Award from the Chartered Institute of Library and Information Professionals. The Chartered Institution of Building Services Engineers declared it their Major Project of the Year, and it was the "Operational Project with Best Design" at the Public–Private Finance Awards. The Royal Institute of British Architects gave it their Regional Award, the Concrete Society awarded the library a Certificate of Excellence, and the Sussex Heritage Trust gave it their Community Award. At the British Construction Industry Awards, Jubilee Library won the Prime Minister's Better Public Buildings Award and the Building Projects Award. The Jubilee Square development as a whole won the "Best Practice in Regeneration Award for Best Design-led Regeneration Project", given by the British Urban Regeneration Association. Four more honours followed in 2006: a Civic Trust Award, The Observer newspaper's Ethical Award in the Buildings category, an International Green Apple Award for the Built Environment and Architectural Heritage, and (jointly with another project) the Art and Work Award for a Site-specific Commission. The project was also a finalist or runner-up in contests including the 2005 Stirling Prize—an international competition run by the Royal Institute of British Architects.

== Impact and reception ==
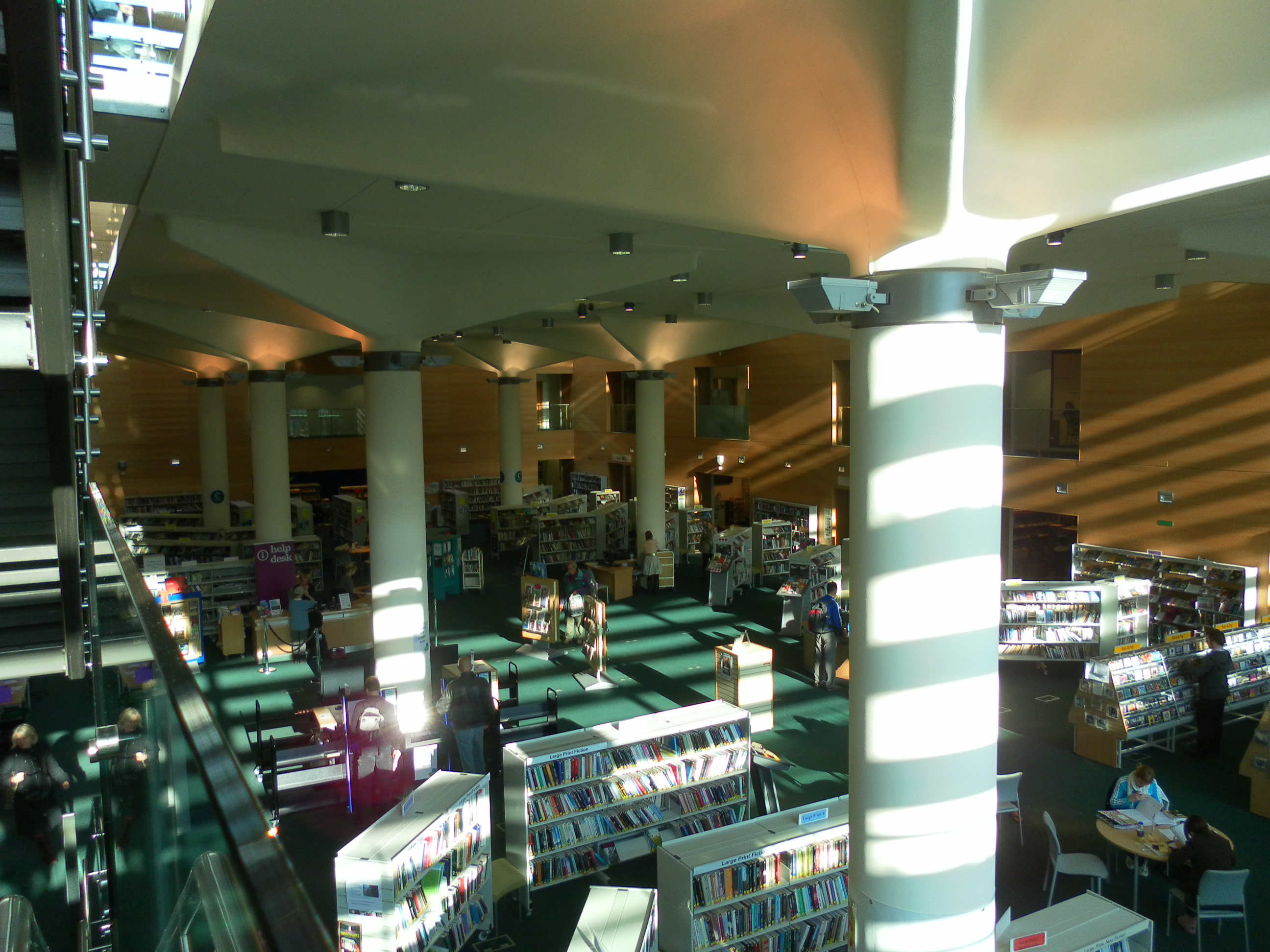
The library has large areas of open space.

The Jubilee Square development as a whole has been praised for linking two important historic parts of the city centre—the North Laine and the Royal Pavilion grounds—which had previously been isolated from each other by the "desolate space" of temporary car parks and wasteland. The library's opening and success encouraged commercial development round it, which in turn helped to pay for it through the 25-year private finance scheme set up in 2000. However, the private investment wasn't celebrated by all, with Owen Hatherley calling it "a pretty, thoughtful building fighting against its PFI execution and the signage of Pizza Express... the idea seems to be that a public good must always be offset by private concession".

The council estimated in 2005 that the library and the associated commercial development would generate £20 million for the city's economy, based on increased spending by visitors and the creation of hundreds of jobs. It spent £1.6 million of public money on the scheme, so a greater than tenfold return on investment was expected. The new library saw visitor numbers which were three times greater than before, loans were 70% higher and thousands more people had joined Brighton & Hove Libraries. The private finance contract allowed the council to buy new stock at preferential rates, and about 20,000 new items were added in the first few months.

Some internal design features have been criticised. Only a single staircase on one side of the building connects the three storeys. It leads into "claustrophobic" corridors which contrast with the open spaces of the main building. The large internal space makes the stock displays appear modest. The shelving units have been described as "awful" and "well below the design quality" of the rest of the library. The opening hours were considered inadequate by some, but were later extended.

== Services ==
The library is open 7 days a week, offering book lending, Wi-Fi, computer use, newspapers, exhibition space and a dedicated British Library Business & IP Centre. They also run dedicated sessions for getting people online, film screenings, children's events and have held drag queen storytime.

The library has also held dedicated programmes for LGBT+ History Month, Black History Month and Refugee Week. It is also a venue used as part of Brighton Fringe.

== See also ==
- Libraries in Brighton and Hove
