= Denise Bennetts =

British architect

Denise Bennetts FRIAS
- Born: Denise Margaret May Bennetts; January 1953 (age 73)
- Education: Edinburgh College of Art, Heriot-Watt University
- Occupation: Architect
- Employer: Bennetts Associates
- Notable work: Bayes Centre, Edinburgh
- Spouse: Robert (Rab) Bennetts
- Website: www.bennettsassociates.com

Denise Margaret Mary Bennetts FRIAS (born 1953) is a British architect and co-founder of Bennetts Associates, an architecture firm based in England. Bennetts has won multiple awards and her company's most recent project was Bayes Centre for the University of Edinburgh, which was opened by Princess Anne on 23 October 2018.

== Early life ==
Denise Bennetts was born January 1953, with her full name being Denise Margaret May Bennetts.

== Education ==
In 1977, Bennetts graduated from Edinburgh College of Art, Heriot-Watt University, with a RIBA (Royal Institute of British Architects) professional award and was joint winner with Rab Bennetts of the Final Year Prize.

== Career ==
In 1987, Bennetts and her partner Rab founded Bennetts Associates, an architecture firm, with offices in London, England. In 1994, the Edinburgh office was opened and recently Manchester in 2015. She currently serves as Director and Secretary of the company. In 2013, Bennetts was appointed to the jury for the contest to design RIBA's new London office following criticism that the judging panel was not diverse.

== Events ==
- RIAS Centenary Convention 2016, Edinburgh, Friday 13 – Saturday 14 May.
- Recent works with surprising connections to Rome, The British School at Rome, Thursday 5 July 2018.

== Notable buildings ==
Bennetts worked on the design of the Bayes Centre at the University of Edinburgh. The building houses researchers, students and entrepreneurs working in data science and artificial intelligence. The centre was officially inaugurated on 23 October 2018 by Princess Anne.

== Personal life ==
Bennetts's husband is Robert (Rab) Bennetts.
