= Coldean =

Suburb of Brighton and Hove, England

Coordinates: 50°51′41″N 0°06′36″W

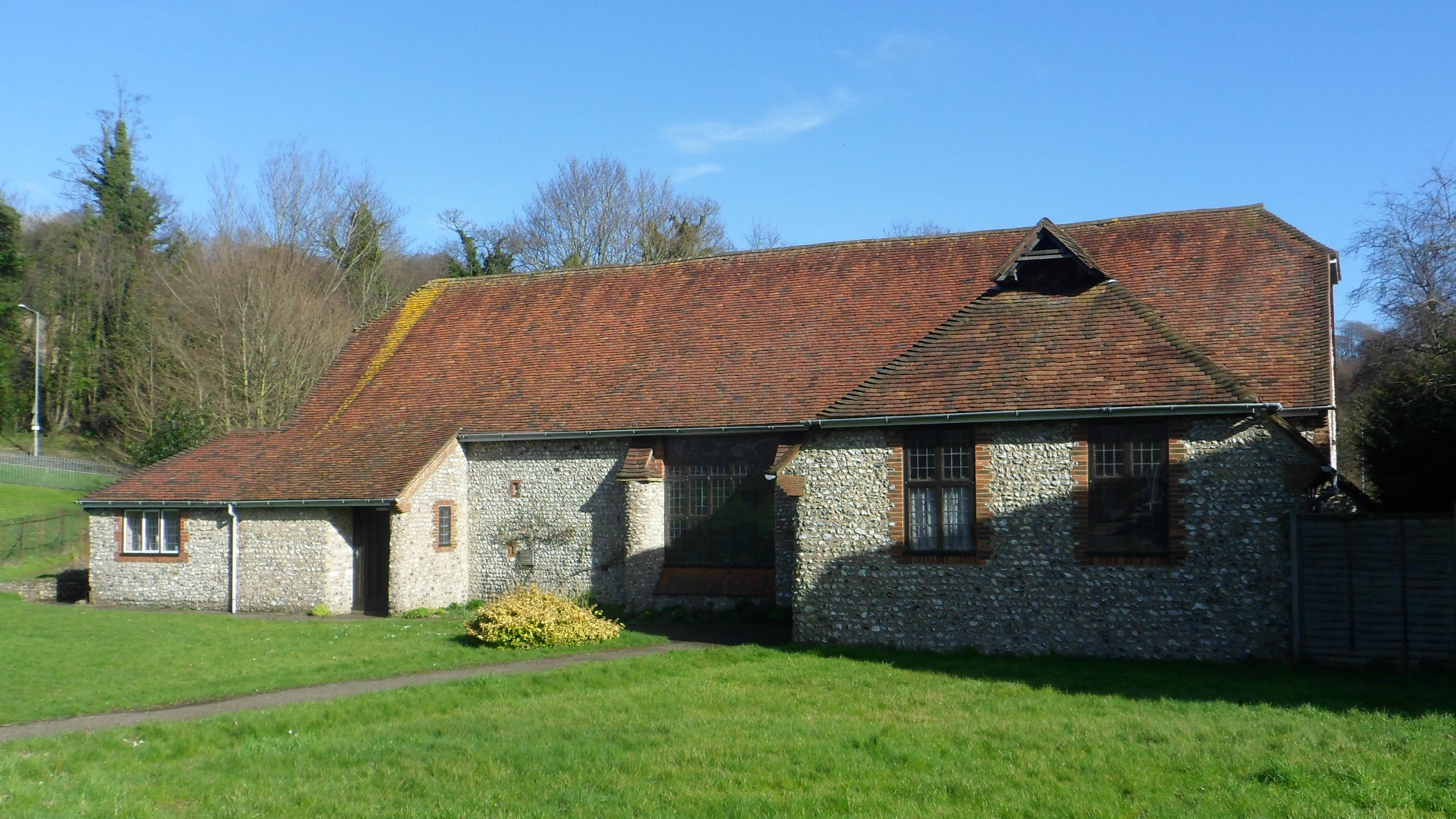
- Saint Mary Magdalene Church
- Unitary authority: Brighton and Hove
- Ceremonial county: East Sussex
- Region: South East
- Country: England
- Sovereign state: United Kingdom
- Post town: BRIGHTON
- Postcode district: BN1
- Dialling code: 01273
- Police: Sussex
- Fire: East Sussex
- Ambulance: South East Coast
- UK Parliament: Brighton, Pavilion

Coldean is a suburb of the English city of Brighton and Hove. Located in the northeast corner of the urban area, it was developed by Brighton Corporation in the 1950s as one of several postwar council estates necessitated by the acute housing shortage in the area after World War II.

The estate occupies a deep valley on the historic boundary of Stanmer parish. The few farm buildings and cottages in existence from the 18th century were supplemented in the 1930s by a pub and a few privately built houses; but it was only from 1950, and especially after the area's incorporation into the Borough of Brighton two years later, that the construction of houses and other facilities began in earnest. Churches, a school, a library and shops were all provided; regular bus services were started; and the development of the nearby universities of Brighton and Sussex later in the 20th century prompted other changes, including the construction of a large area of student accommodation.

Coldean is characterised by low-density housing, much of it semi-detached and most now owner-occupied, with roads following the contours of the landscape. The deep valley, its steep sides mainly wooded and unsuitable for development, "[give] the impression of an area isolated from the rest of Brighton"; and the area has the character of "a quiet garden suburb".

== History ==
Coldean was originally a deep, steep-sided, undeveloped valley (Note: "Dean" is an Old English word meaning "valley".) split between the parishes of Falmer and Stanmer, with Hollingbury to the west, Wild Park and the 584-foot (178 m) Hollingbury Hill to the southwest, Stanmer Park and Stanmer village to the northeast and Falmer village to the east. Lewes Road, formerly part of the A27 trunk road, ran along the southern edge of the valley, and some cottages and farm buildings associated with Coldean Farm were clustered near it. Prior to its development as a housing estate, it was known as "Cold Dean" or "Colddean"; the 1938 Ordnance Survey map shows "Colddean Lane" extending a short distance northwards from Lewes Road then continuing as a track, and "Colddean Wood" to the east on the side of the valley. To cater for increasing traffic between Brighton, Lewes and the village of Ditchling, which could be reached via Coldean Lane and Ditchling Beacon, a pub called the Hiker's Rest was built near the junction of Coldean Lane and Lewes Road in 1937.

Residential development began in 1934, when the Parkside estate was laid out by private developers in the southwest corner of the valley. The housing, centred on Park Road, was finished in 1948. The area was beyond the Brighton Corporation borough boundary in Falmer parish. In 1947, the Corporation bought the rest of the land; and the whole valley was brought within the Borough of Brighton on 1 April 1952 when, under the terms of the 1951 Brighton Extension Act, most of the territory covered by Falmer and Stanmer parishes was annexed.

Brighton experienced a severe housing shortage after World War II. Over 1,000 houses were destroyed or seriously damaged by bombs during the Brighton Blitz and other wartime raids, and nearly 11,000 others suffered some damage; and slum clearance programmes started in the 1930s resumed in the 1950s. "The serious … shortage was tackled with vigour" by Brighton Corporation, which developed several estates of council housing in the 1950s: as well as Coldean, extensive building work took place at Bevendean, Hollingbury, Hollingdean and Woodingdean. About 500 prefab houses were put up throughout the town, including in Coldean; but permanent houses were preferred, and the Corporation started to develop Coldean from 1950—mostly with semi-detached houses, which make up more than half of the housing stock. One old building from Coldean Farm was retained: a flint-built barn of late 18th-century vintage, which was "sensitively converted" into St Mary Magdalene's Anglican church and community centre in 1955 by local architect John Leopold Denman.

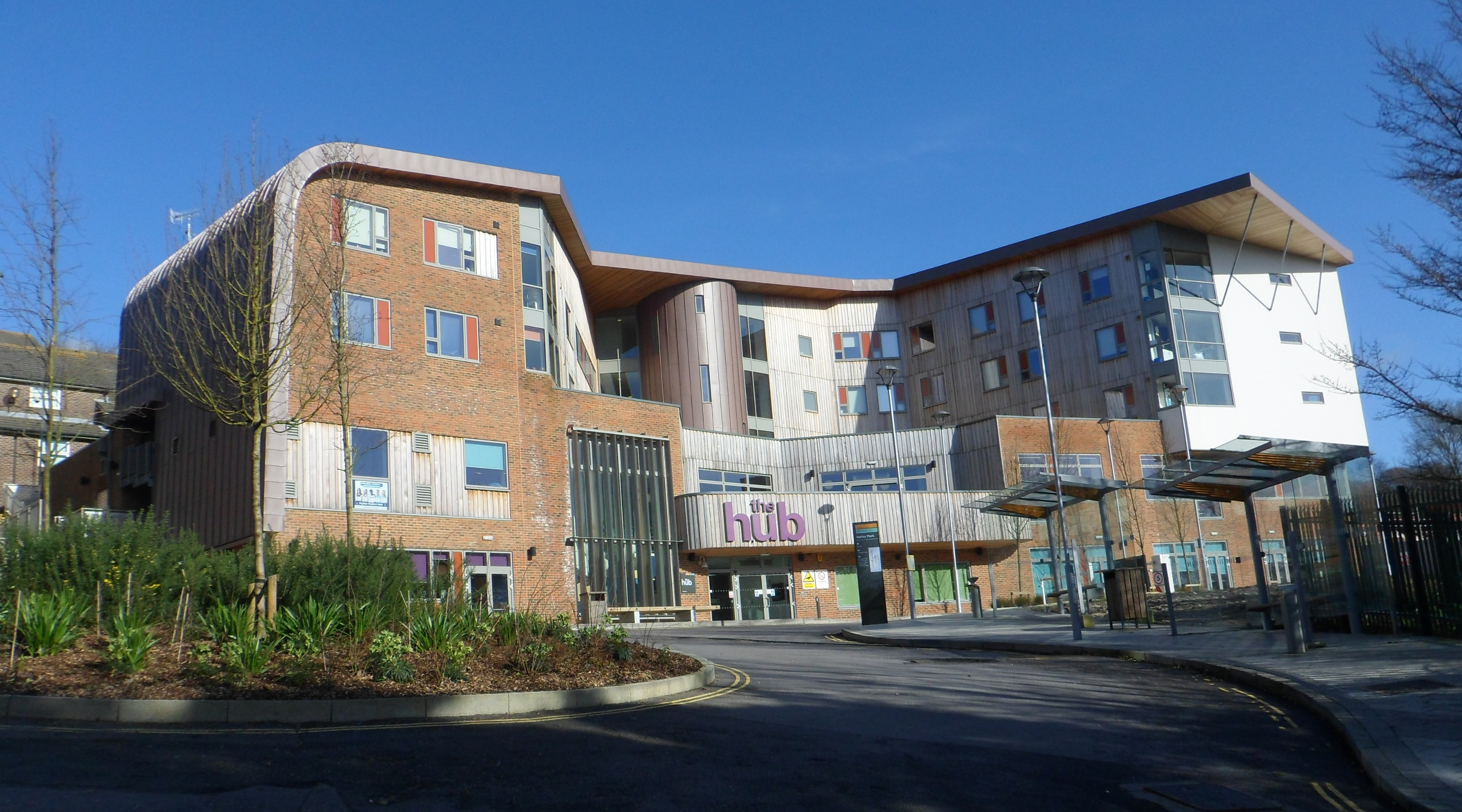
Varley Halls

Development of the estate continued throughout the 1950s, 1960s and 1970s. A junior school was built on Selham Drive; a second church opened c. 1954 on Park Road to serve local adherents of the Church of Jesus Christ of Latter-day Saints; (Note: It was registered for worship in February 1954. Collis (2010) incorrectly dates it to 1963.) and in 1975 a branch library opened on Beatty Avenue. The Latter-day Saint church was only used until 1993, when a much larger meetinghouse was registered on a new site on Lewes Road; the building on Park Road was converted into a house, which was proposed for demolition in 2020. A children's playground opened in April 1989; it was named after George Humphrey, a long-serving local councillor who represented the Stanmer ward. in 1994, work began on the Brighton and Hove Bypass, which diverted the A27 trunk road away from the urban area. The easternmost section, from the Old Boat Corner interchange at Ditchling Road to the junction with Lewes Road, was close to the northern edge of Coldean; Coldean Lane was crossed on a bridge, and the Downsview Special School was demolished in 1990 as the route was prepared. The school moved to Woodingdean; a second site has since been established in Hollingdean.

In the late 20th century, an area of woodland east of Coldean Lane was developed to form Varley Halls, an area of student housing for the University of Brighton. The facilities were expanded in 2012, by which point the 500-room development was the university's largest halls of residence, and 2016–17, providing more accommodation and a new social and community building called "Student Hub". In the main part of the Coldean estate, a new library, twice the size of its mid-1970s predecessor, opened in June 2008. It occupies the ground floor of a three-storey block of housing association flats for elderly people. The new development cost £700,000. The Hiker's Rest pub later closed but was sold and refurbished; it reopened in 2018 as Ruby Brighton, a pub, sports bar, restaurant and 10-bedroom hotel.

== Transport ==
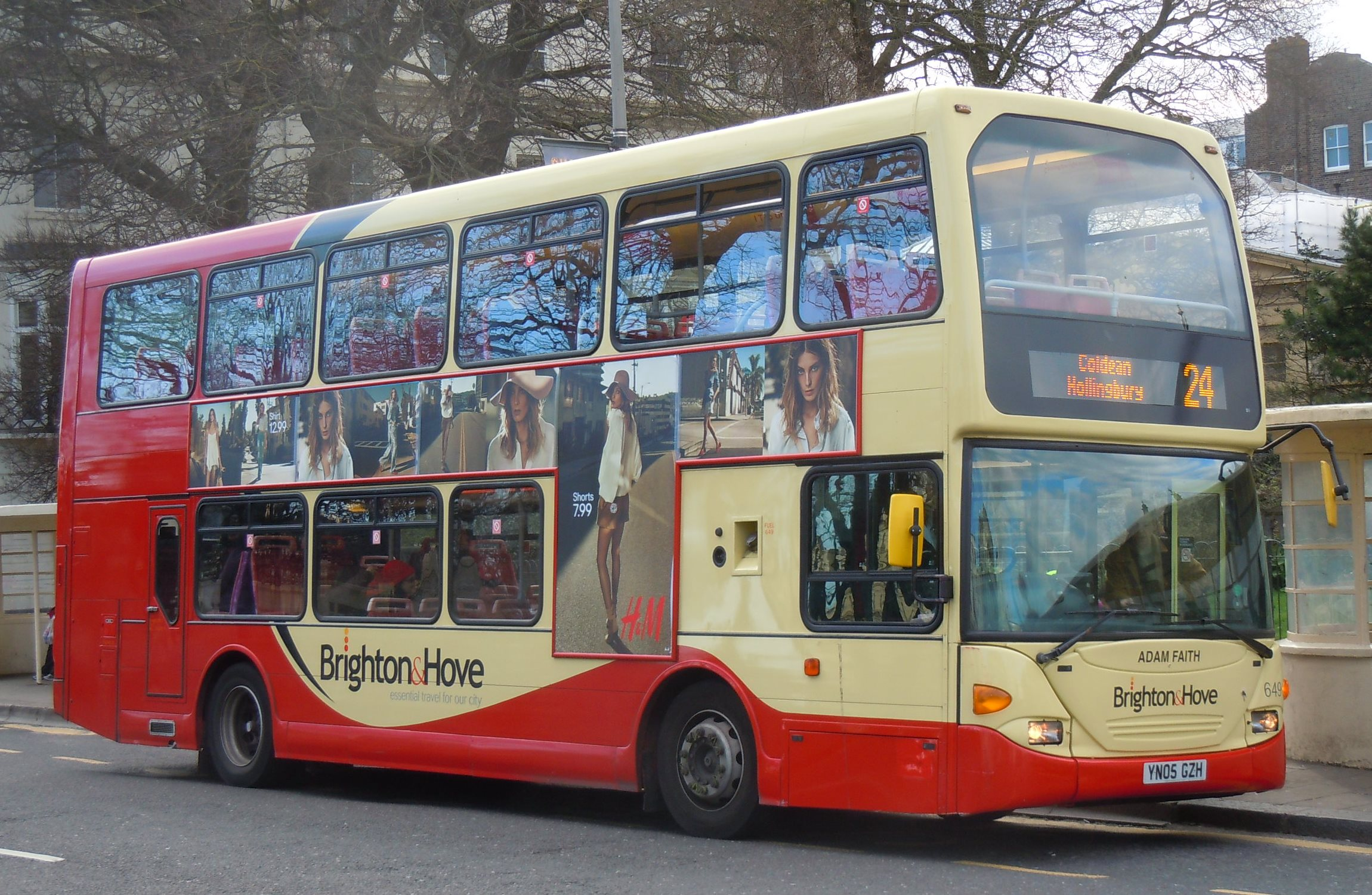
A route 24 bus to Coldean and Hollingbury at Old Steine, Brighton

For many years, Coldean has been connected to central Brighton by buses running the length of Lewes Road, operated by the Brighton & Hove bus company. Typical journey times by bus as of 2009 were 5 minutes to the ASDA superstore at Hollingbury; about 15 minutes to the Sainsbury's superstore and local shopping area on Lewes Road; 20 minutes to the local shopping area on London Road; and 30 minutes to the centre of Brighton.

At the time of deregulation in 1986, three buses per hour served the estate in each direction—towards Churchill Square shopping centre, and to the Hollingbury estate. Buses terminated in Coldean between 1990 and 1995 instead of continuing to Hollingbury, and services were cut to half-hourly in 1993—although these were extended beyond Brighton to central Hove, with alternate services continuing to the Goldstone Valley estate and to Portslade and Southwick. These extensions ceased in 1995, when the route (numbered 25A) was curtailed at Churchill Square shopping centre again.

The service pattern in operation as of 2026 was established in 1996, when route 25A was renumbered 24 and began to be interworked with route 26 (Hollingbury–Ditchling Road–Churchill Square shopping centre). Buses travelling from Brighton via Lewes Road to Coldean would continue to the ASDA supermarket in Hollingbury, where they would change route number and return to Brighton via Ditchling Road; and the same would happen in reverse. "The link-up ... gave more travel opportunities for Coldean people, including an improved 10-minute frequency" to the centre of Brighton.

In 2007, night bus N25—introduced a year earlier to serve the University of Sussex campus—was diverted via Coldean, operating the full length of Coldean Lane via Varley Halls then doubling back. Since 2010, some rush-hour services on route 5B (Hangleton–Hollingbury) have been extended from Hollingbury to the University of Sussex campus via Coldean. For students living at the Varley Halls complex on Coldean Lane, the University of Brighton operates its own buses (route UB1) on weekdays. Eleven services operate per day towards the university's Falmer campus (northbound) and Old Steine in central Brighton (southbound). Only students with a university identity card are allowed to use these buses.

The Coldean estate is approximately equidistant from Moulsecoomb and Falmer railway stations on the East Coastway line. Access to the main road network is available via Lewes Road (the A270) at the south end of the estate; Ditchling Road at the north end; and the A27 Brighton and Hove Bypass at the Old Boat Corner interchange just beyond Ditchling Road.

== Cultural references ==
Coldean is referenced in the chapter "The Concluding Chaotic Conundrum of the Coldean Cat" of the fantasy novel The Brightonomicon.

== Bibliography ==
- Antram, Nicholas; Pevsner, Nikolaus (2013). Sussex: East with Brighton and Hove. The Buildings of England. London: Yale University Press. ISBN 978-0-300-18473-0.
- Chapman, Brigid (1996). Brighton in the Fifties. Lewes: The Book Guild. ISBN 1-85776-151-0.
- Collis, Rose (2010). The New Encyclopaedia of Brighton. (based on the original by Tim Carder) (1st ed.). Brighton: Brighton & Hove Libraries. ISBN 978-0-9564664-0-2.
- Fines, Ken (2002). A History of Brighton & Hove. Chichester: Phillimore & Co. ISBN 1-86077-231-5.
- French, Roger (2010). Pride and Joy: My Amazing 25-year Journey with Brighton & Hove Buses. London: Best Impressions. ISBN 978-0-9565740-0-8.
