= Bennetts Associates =

British architectural firm

Bennetts Associates Architects
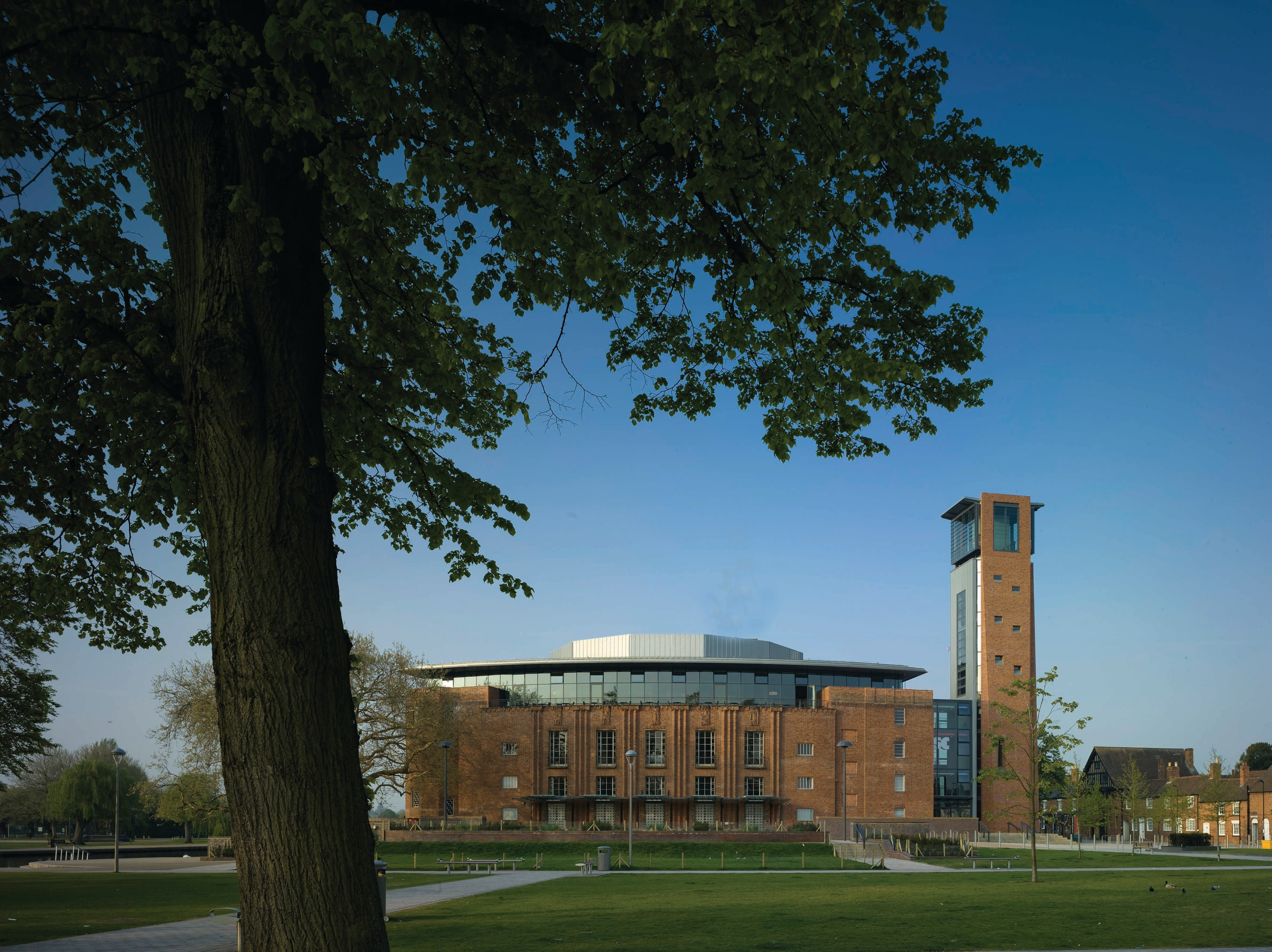
- Royal Shakespeare Theatre in Stratford-upon-Avon

Practice information
- Key architects: Denise Bennetts, Rab Bennetts
- Partners: Julian Lipscombe; Simon Erridge; Peter Fisher; James Nelmes
- Founders: Denise Bennetts, Rab Bennetts
- Founded: 1987; 39 years ago
- Location: London, Edinburgh and Manchester

Significant works and honors
- Buildings: Royal Shakespeare Theatre; Jubilee Library, Brighton; Hampstead Theatre, Camden, London; Informatics Forum, University of Edinburgh, Bayes Centre, University of Edinburgh

Website
- www.bennettsassociates.com

Bennetts Associates is a British firm of architects. It was founded in 1987 by Denise Bennetts and Rab Bennetts, who had previously worked for Ove Arup & Partners. In 2016 the firm's total shareholding was transferred to an Employee Ownership Trust.

In 1991 Bennetts Associates were shortlisted for the RIBA Building of the Year Award for Imperium Offices in Reading, and have been shortlisted for its successor, the Stirling Prize, four times: for the Richard Attenborough Centre at the University of Leicester in 1998; for the Jubilee Library in Brighton in 2005; for the Royal Shakespeare Theatre in Stratford-upon-Avon in 2011; and for the BEAM arts and culture venue in Hertford in 2026.

National Life Stories conducted an oral history interview (C467/103) with Rab Bennetts in 2012–13 for its Architects' Lives collection, held by the British Library.

== Projects ==
Projects undertaken by the firm have included:

- 1994: PowerGen headquarters, Coventry
- 2002: Loch Lomond Gateway and Orientation Centre, Dumbartonshire
- 2003: Hampstead Theatre, Camden, London
- 2009: Elizabeth II Court, Hampshire County Council Offices, Winchester
- 2010: Mint Hotel, Tower of London
- 2010: Royal Shakespeare Theatre, Stratford-upon-Avon
- 2011: Mint Hotel, Amsterdam
- 2018: Bayes Centre at the University of Edinburgh
- 2021: Crossrail suburban stations, West London
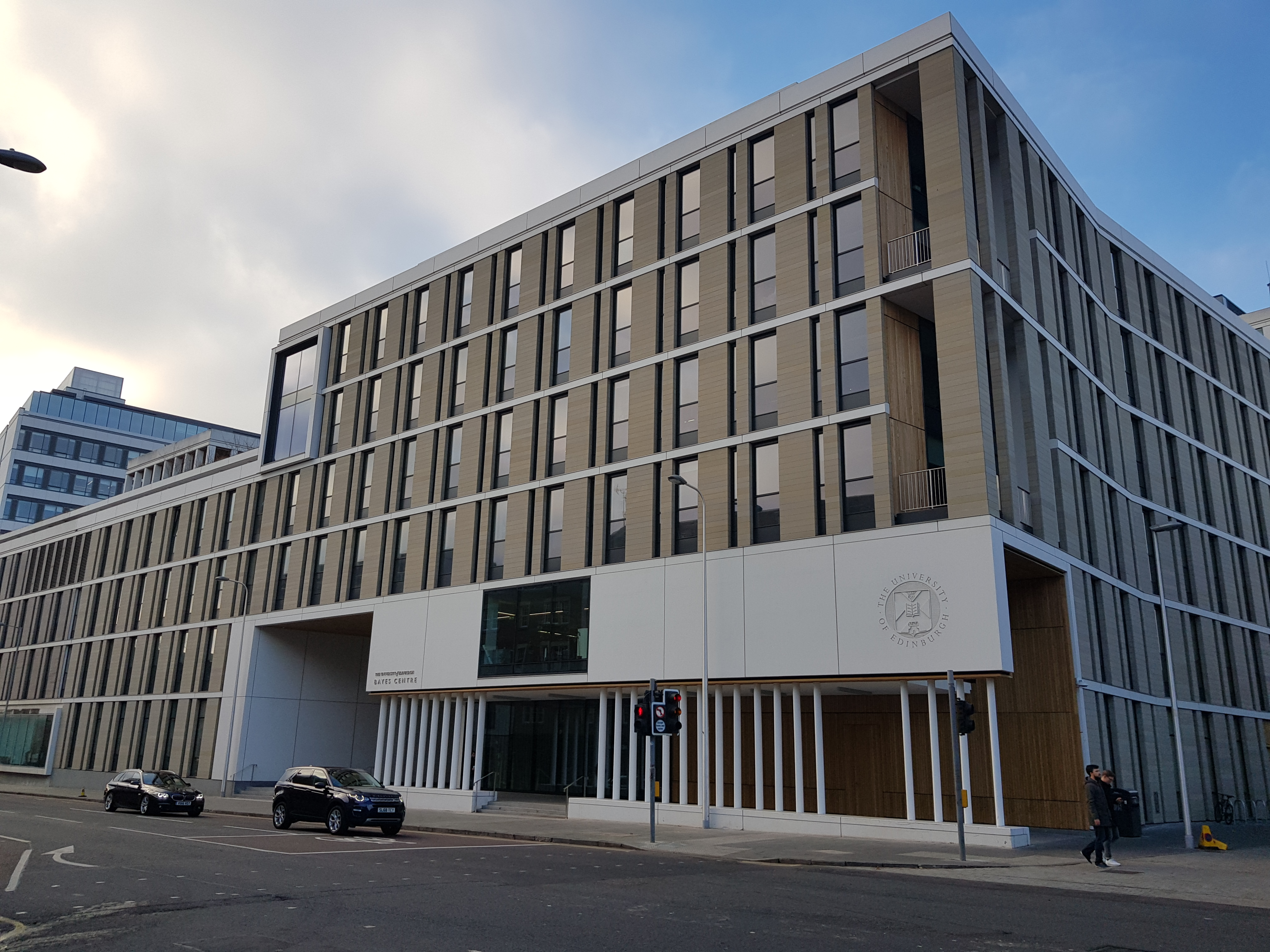
Bayes Centre, University of Edinburgh
