= Hollingbury =

Area of Brighton and Hove, England

Coordinates: 50.859722°N 0.131667°W

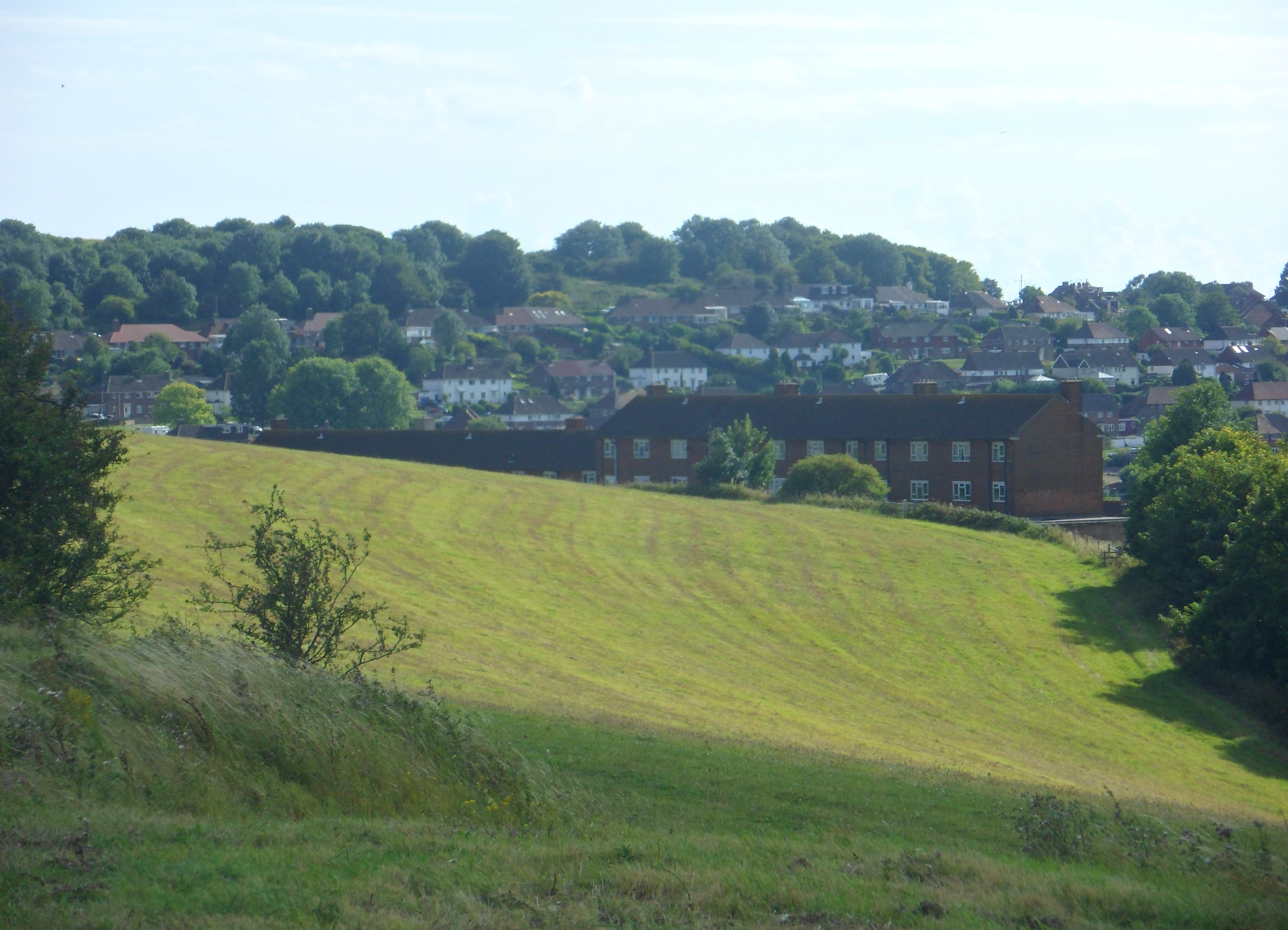
- Hollingbury Estate seen from Old Boat Corner

- Location within East Sussex
- Unitary authority: Brighton and Hove
- Ceremonial county: East Sussex
- Region: South East
- Country: England
- Sovereign state: United Kingdom
- Post town: Brighton
- Postcode district: BN1
- Dialling code: 01273
- Police: Sussex
- Fire: East Sussex
- Ambulance: South East Coast
- UK Parliament: Brighton Pavilion

Hollingbury is an area of the city of Brighton and Hove, East Sussex. The area sits high on a hillside across the north of the city, east of Patcham which lies in a valley to the west, Coldean in a valley to the east, and the A27 bypass forming the northern limit. To the south it blends into the leafy Surrenden area and the busy Fiveways local shopping area.

Hollingbury Hill itself reaches an elevation of 584 feet (178 m) above sea level and on the summit is Hollingbury Castle Camp, an Iron Age hillfort dating from around the sixth century B.C. It is where Triangulation Point (or Trigpoint) TP3970 used for the 1936 Ordnance Survey mapping of Great Britain is located.

The north-western slopes of the hill have been developed and are populated with housing dating from the 1940s onwards with minor retail and industrial use.

== History ==
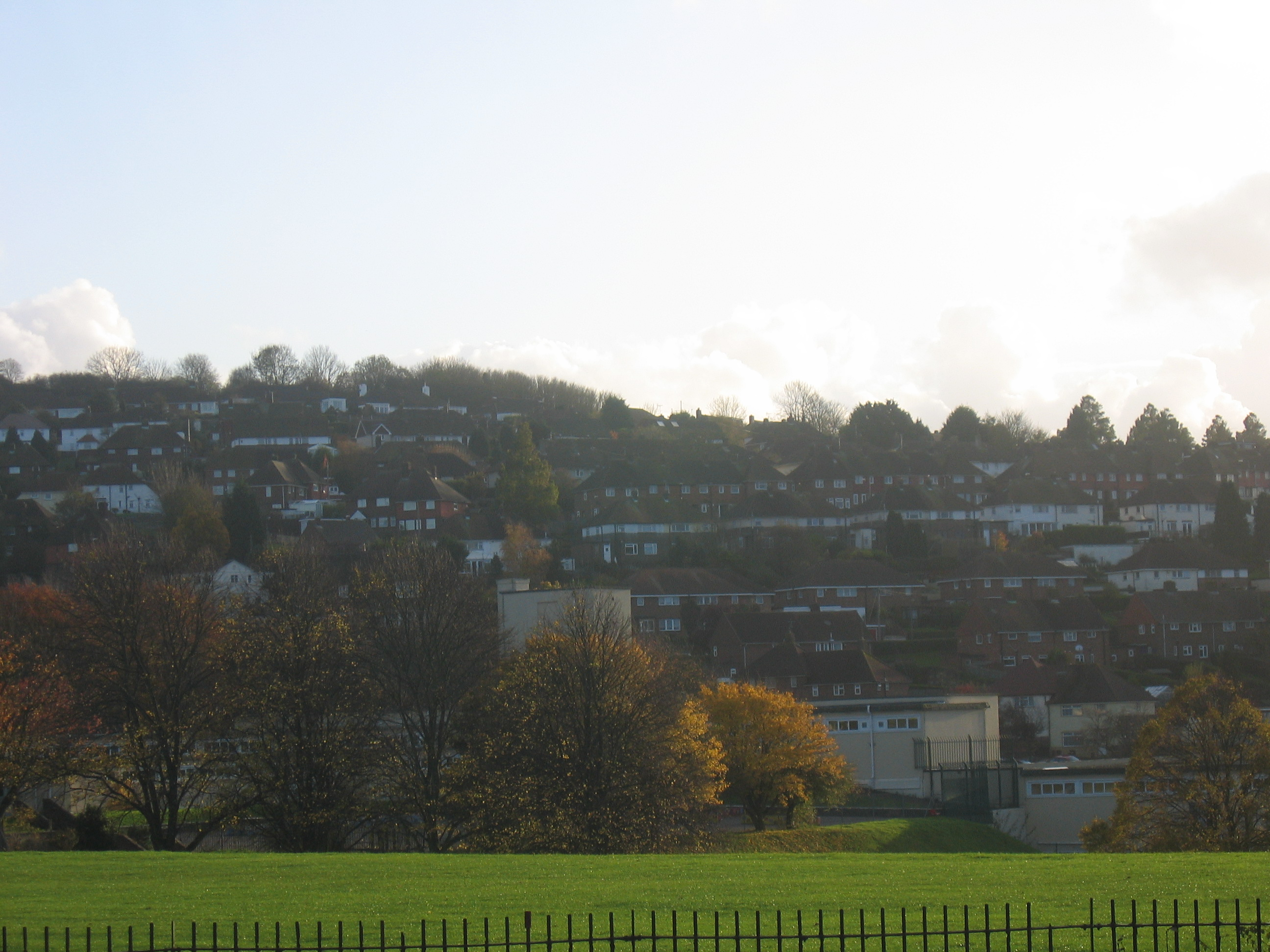
Hollingbury housing estate

The building of Hollingbury housing estate, located on the north-western slopes of the hill, commenced in 1946. The development is a mixture of bungalows, flats and houses with most of the earlier properties having large gardens. Some properties were originally owned by the local council and some were privately owned although a large number of the local council ones have since been sold. Some roads (Westfield Crescent for example) contained clusters of houses for use as armed forces or police service housing. Most of these have been sold and are now privately owned.

The housing is divided by small parades of local shops which are located throughout the estate along with some public houses.

The estate is the town's largest post-war (World War II) council estate and is built on land originally acquired by the council in November 1909.

== Notable buildings and areas ==
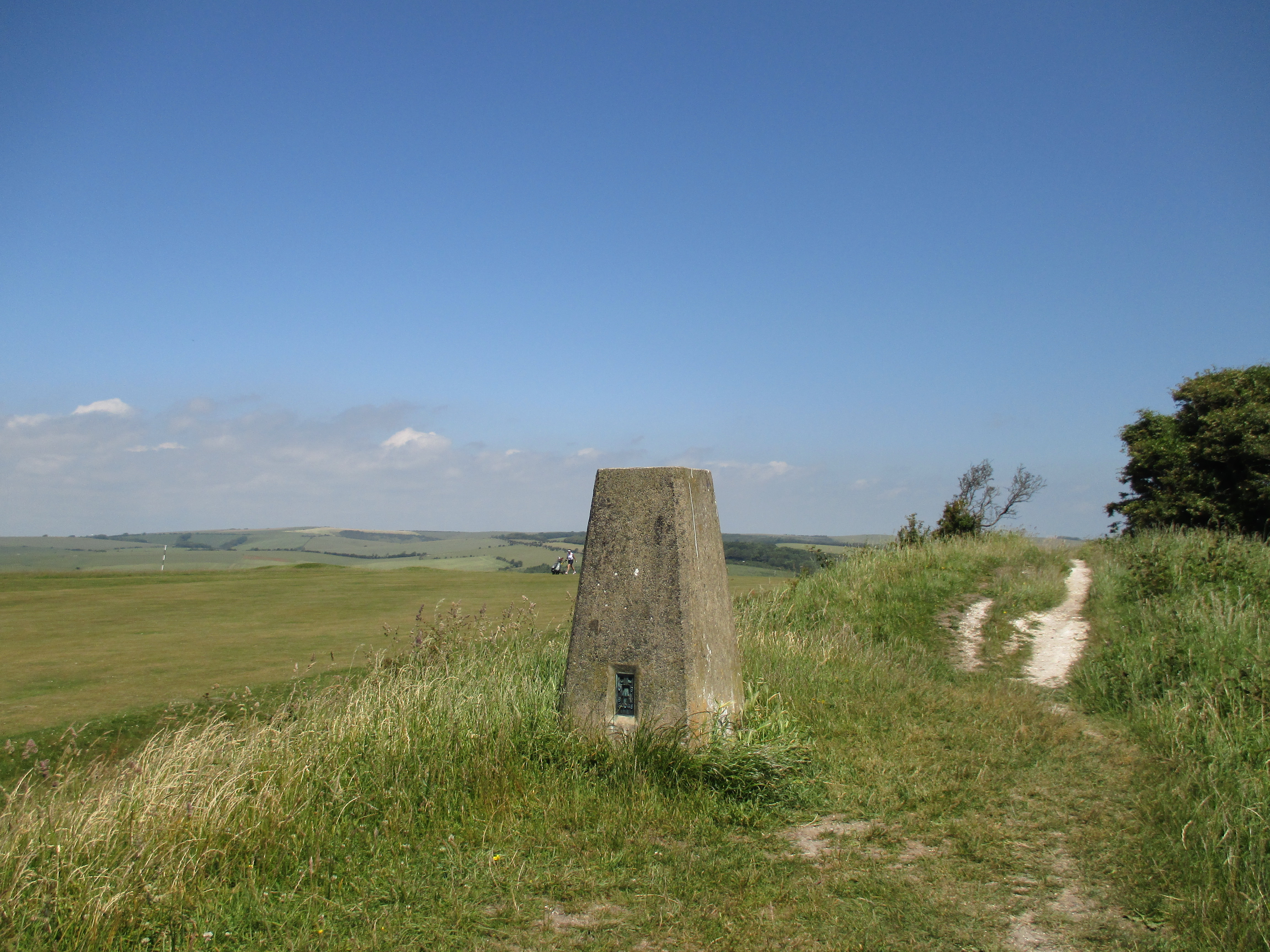
Hollingbury Castle trig point

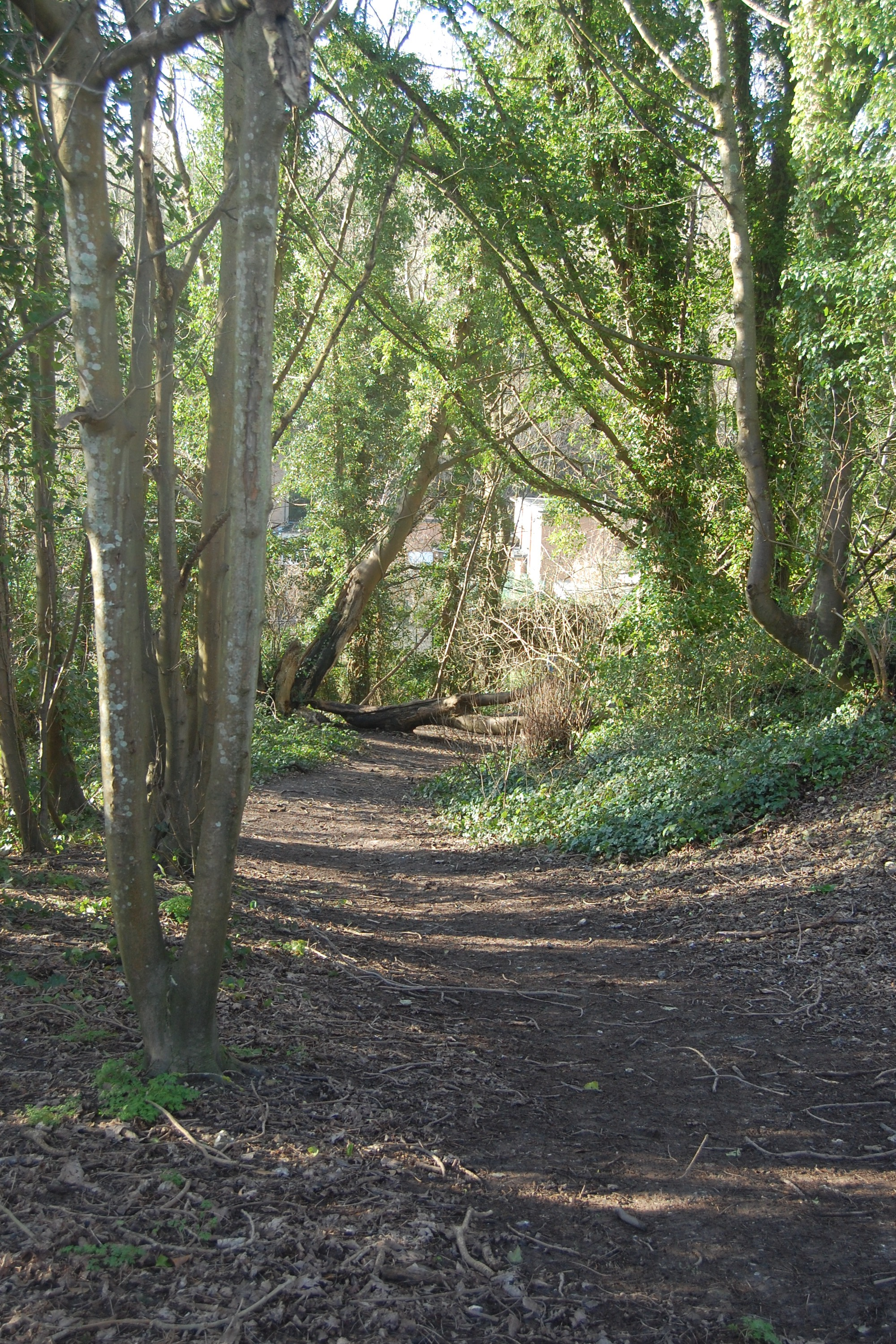
Footpath on Hollingbury Hill, Brighton

The most notable part of this area Hollingbury Castle or hill fort (TQ 322 078). It is to the east of Hollingbury housing estate and the Ditchling Road, Although considered the Castle to be Iron Age, the mounding of four round barrows suggests even Bronze Age people held this place sacred. Now all that remains are thickets of gorse which shine yellow in spring and are home to linnets and goldfinch. European stonechat is a familiar bird, too, and the rarer whinchat and redstart are seen regularly on passage to and from their breeding grounds. The soil within and around the camp has a layer of superficial acidity, with sorrel, bent-grass and tormentil growing there. The Castle is located within Hollingbury Park, an area of approximately 240 acres (0.97 km^{2}; 0.38 sq mi) most of which is occupied by the golf course, designed in 1907 and remodelled in 1936. To the east is Wild Park and to the north is Hollingbury Ridge which runs up to the ancient Stanmer Park, with grazed, downland fields either side of the Ditching Road.

The Park itself has six tennis courts, a bowling green and a children's playground. For many years the park was known by locals as "The Rocket Park" on account of the rocket-shaped climbing frame in the playground but this was removed and the playground extended in the early 1980s. An area towards the northern end of the park is fenced off and contains a weather station and underground reservoir. On a clear day, the park offers views over the city to the English Channel and you can even see the Isle of Wight.

Adjacent to the park is an area of woodland planted in the nineteenth century; the majority of this was destroyed in the Great Storm of October 1987. The local council maintains an easy-access trail through the woodland, which runs down to the Hollingdean district.

Carden Park, located towards the north-east of the estate between Carden school and the industrial estate, occupies approximately 12 acres (0.05 km^{2}; 0.02 sq mi) and was originally laid out in the 1950s. The original tennis courts and swings were lost during industrial development in 1968 and the park now contains a football pitch and play area for young children.

To the north of Hollingbury Industrial is Ladies MIle Local nature reserve.

== Amenities ==
=== Community centre ===
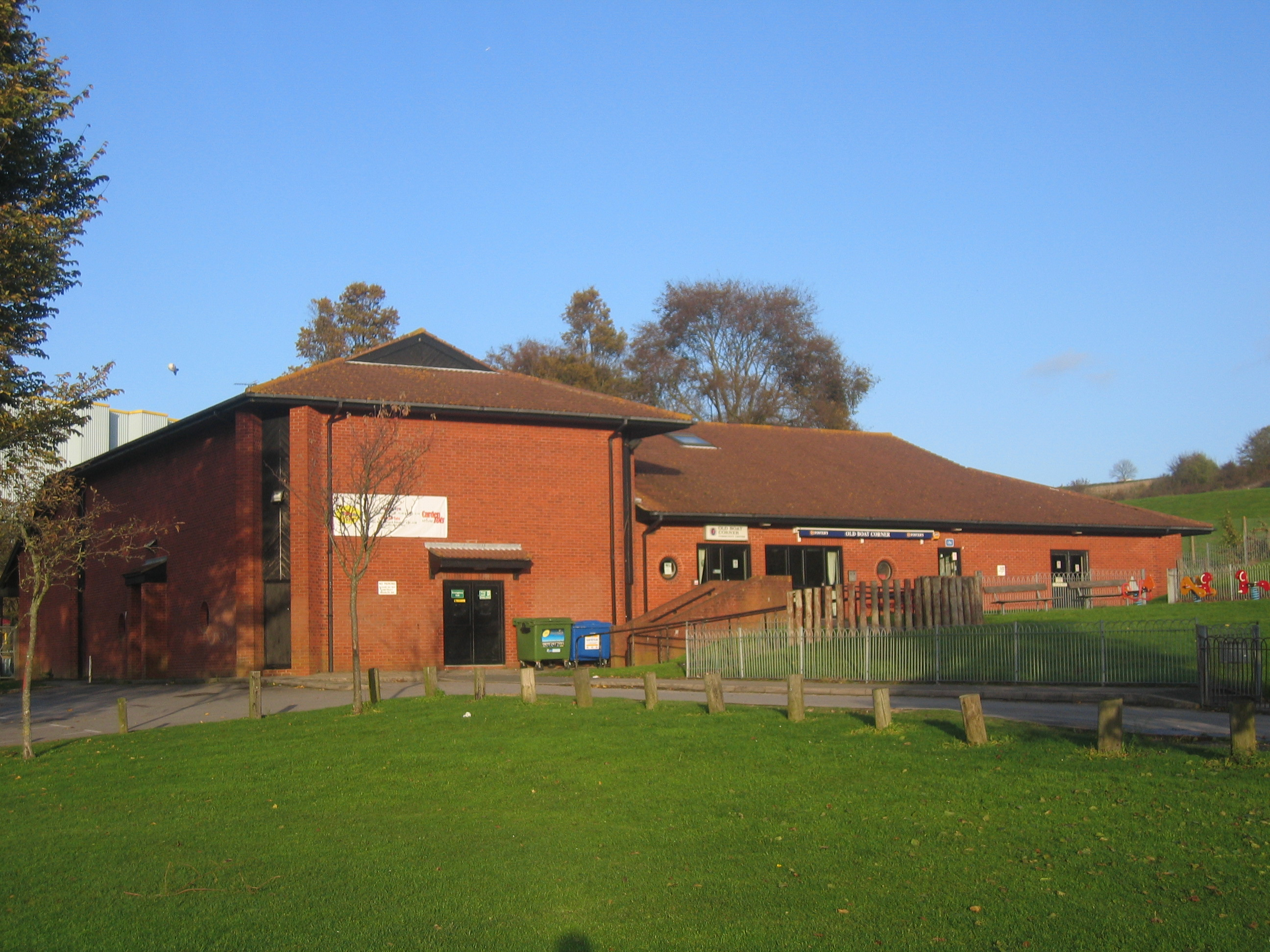
Community centre

As part of the Asda development in 1987, the company built a local community centre, known as Old Boat Corner Community Centre, situated in Carden Park which opened in April 1989. Today the centre is thriving and is very much open to local residents. The community centre has a members social club and a variety of groups run from the centre, including sports clubs, Over 60s clubs, toddler groups and drama classes.

=== Medical centre ===
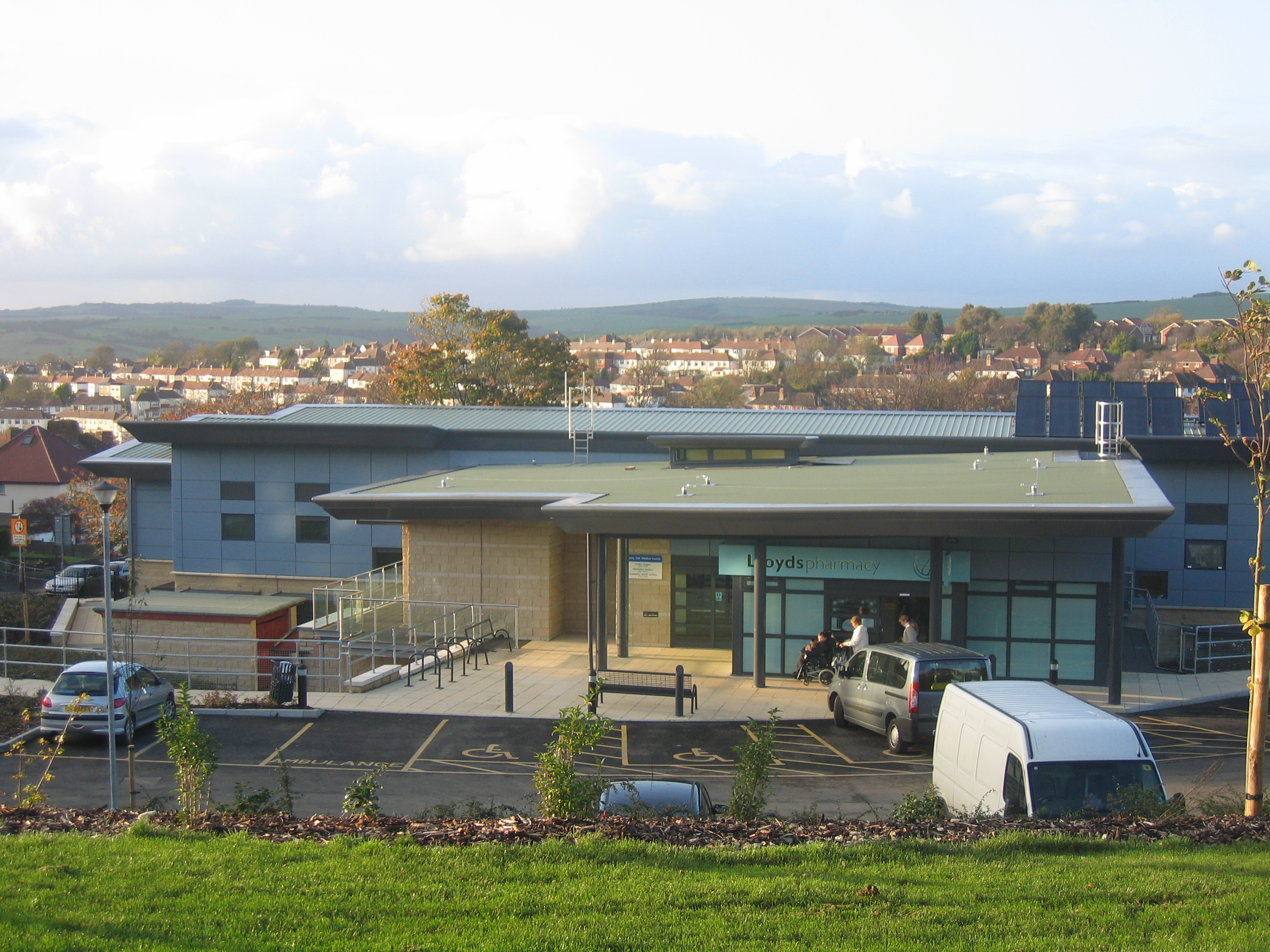
Medical centre

In 2008, a purpose-built medical centre (County Oak medical centre) opened on the previously unused space in the southern corner of Carden School grounds. The building is eco-friendly, making use of solar panels for heating and light tubes to transmit natural daylight into the building.

=== Library ===
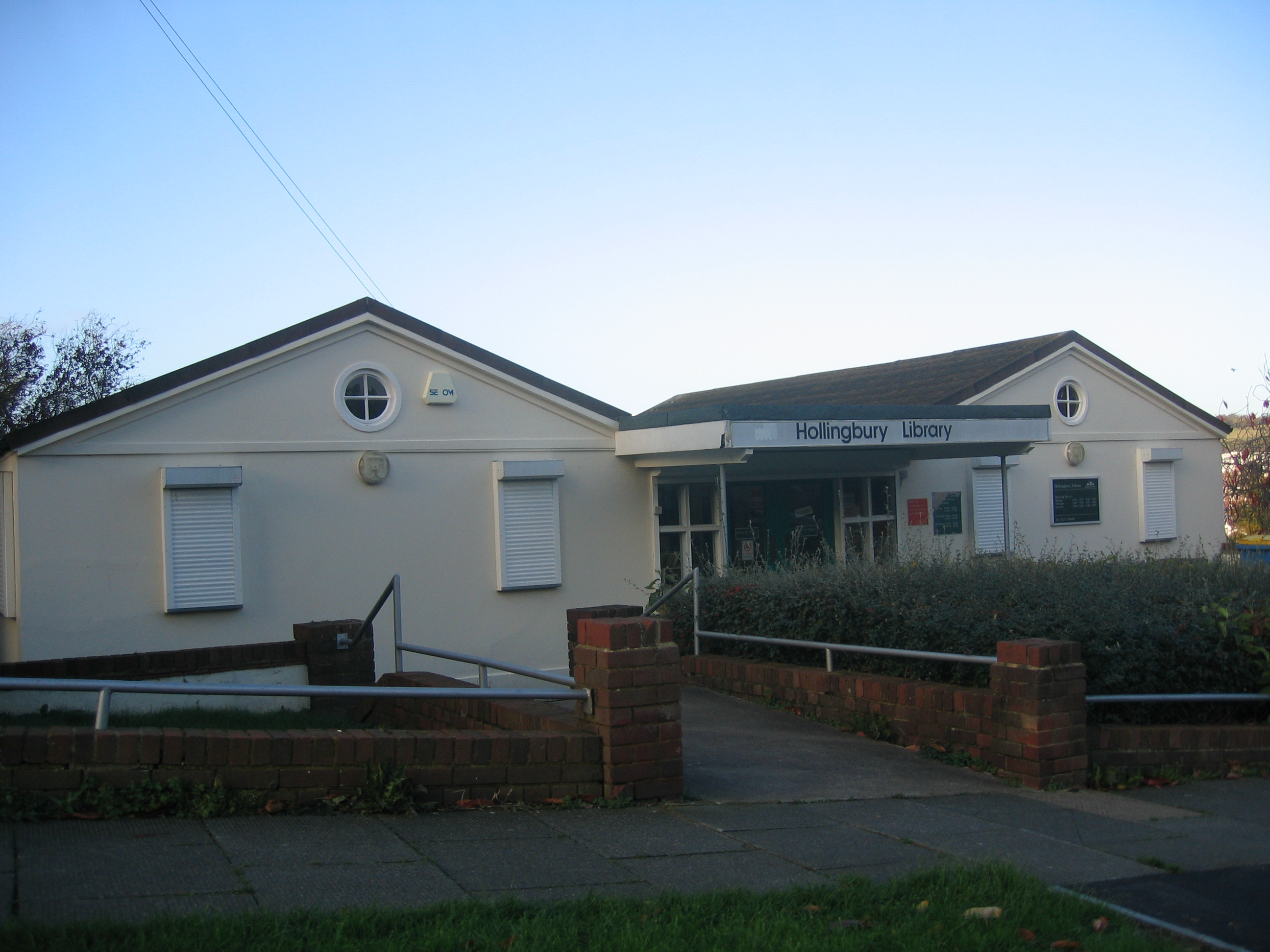
Hollingbury Branch Library

The small branch library in Carden Hill opened on 27 April 1962. The pre-fabricated building which houses the library originally opened in September 1950 as the County Oak public house. When this moved into a newly built brick building in March 1961, the original building was refitted as the library. This library has now permanently closed.

=== Shopping ===
There is a retail estate located in Hollingbury which has a selection of large chain shops, including Matalan, Argos, ASDA and a M&S food hall.

=== Education ===
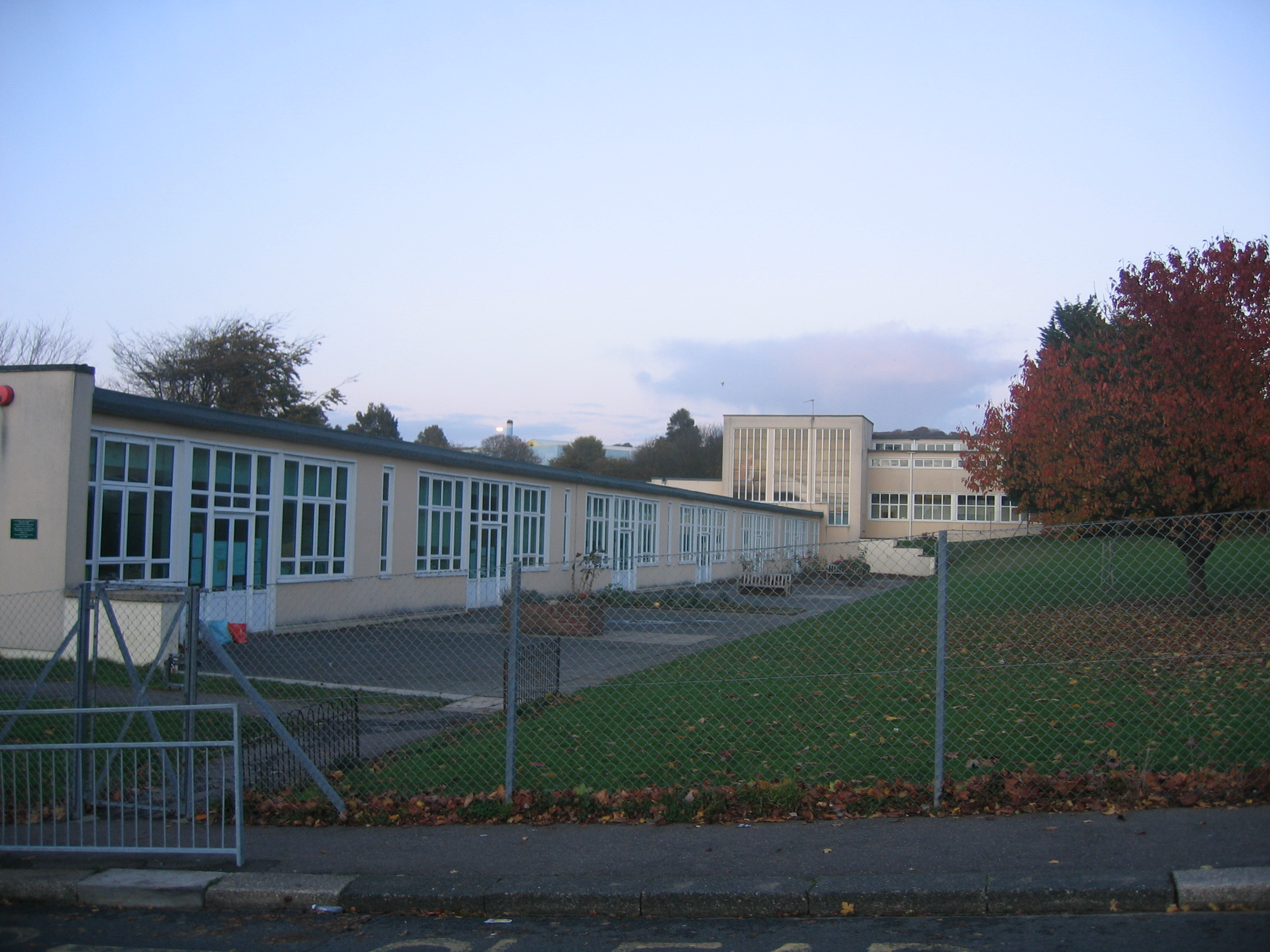
Carden primary school

The main primary school for the area is Carden, built in the late 1940s and one of the first schools to be completed in the post-war period. Alderman Morris, then Mayor of Brighton, laid the foundation stone on 22 October 1947 and the first children attended on 3 September 1948. The school is built on a natural west-facing slope and was constructed in a revolutionary design using pre-cast concrete. The exterior remained unpainted grey textured concrete for many years. The classrooms all have doors which open out onto patio areas leading to the belief that the building was originally designed to be used as a hospital in the event of further hostilities. The original Carden Infants and Carden Junior schools merged in September 1999 to become Carden Primary School.

=== Commerce and industry ===
Hollingbury industrial estate, located in the north-east of the estate near the borders with Stanmer, Coldean and Patcham, occupies around 18 acres (0.07 km^{2}; 0.03 sq mi) and was developed by the local council from 1950. The factories on the estate employed 8,000 local people at one time but most of the manufacturing companies had closed down or moved out by the 1980s when fewer than 1,000 people were employed. The area saw a revival in 1987 with the building of an Asda superstore. Additional retail units followed in subsequent years and the area was further boosted when the offices and printing presses of the local newspaper The Argus moved from the city centre onto the industrial estate.

=== Transport ===
Brighton & Hove routes 5B, 24, 26, 46, 52, 55, 56 and 88 link the Hollingbury estate to the city centre and other outlying areas of the city.

The A27 provides access to the north of the estate, adjacent to the Asda superstore and the A23 access to the west via Patcham.

The nearest railway stations are Preston Park on the Brighton Main Line and London Road (Brighton) on the East Coastway Line.

== Places of interest ==
- Hollingbury Camp, an Iron Age hillfort.
- Hollingbury golf course, a council-run course open to all.

Hollingbury woods
