= St Martin's Church, Brighton =

Church in Brighton, England

Coordinates: 50°50′1″N 0°7′42″W

St Martin's Church
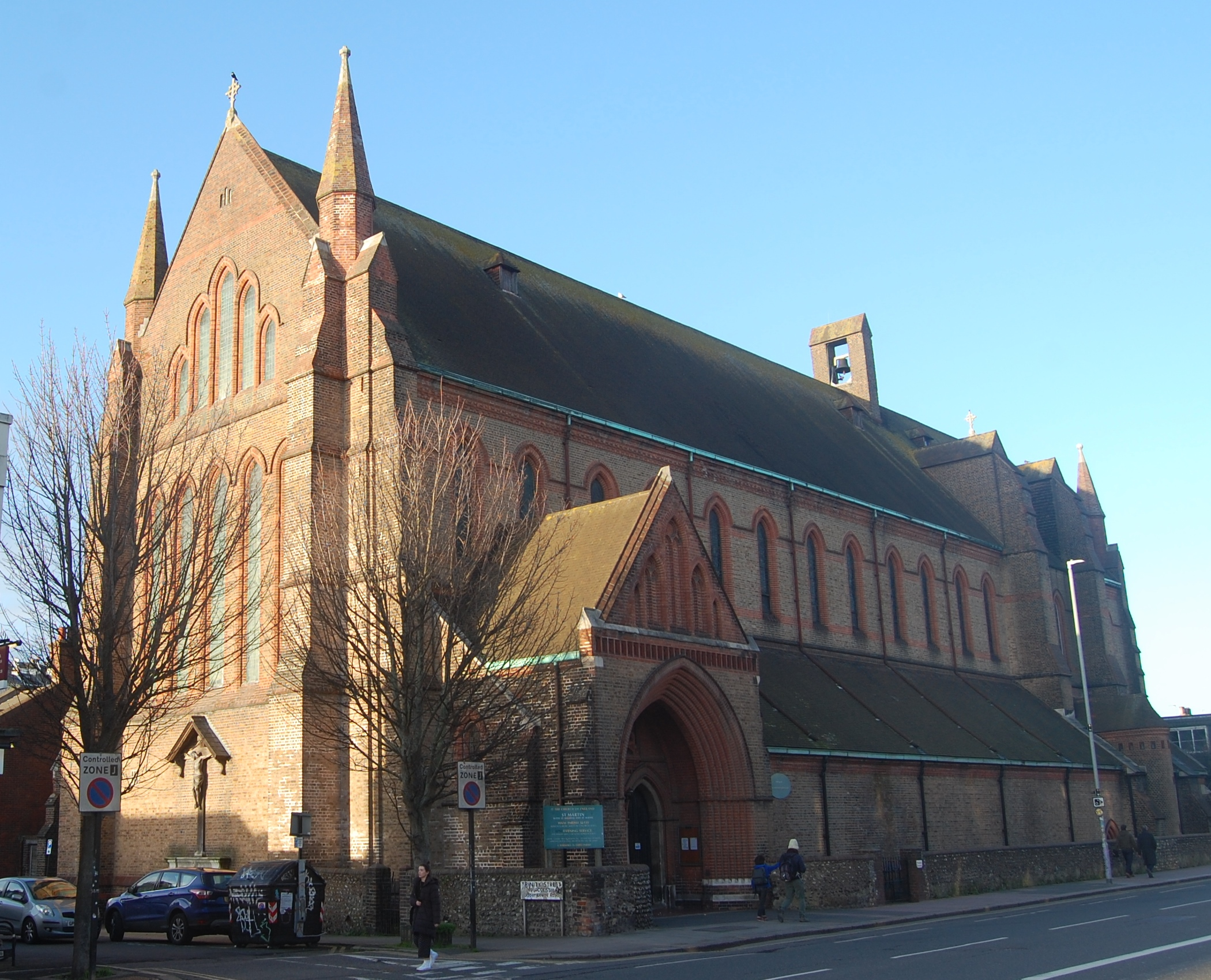
- East and south sides of St Martin's Church
- St Martin's Church
- Denomination: Church of England
- Churchmanship: High Church
- Website: stmartinsbrighton.co.uk

History
- Dedication: St. Martin of Tours
- Consecrated: 1 May 1875

Architecture
- Years built: 1872-1875

Administration
- Province: Canterbury
- Diocese: Chichester
- Archdeaconry: Chichester
- Deanery: Brighton
- Parish: Brighton, St Martins

Clergy
- Priest: Fr Trevor Buxton

St Martin's Church (in full, St Martin with St Wilfrid, St Alban and St Richard Hollingdean) is an Anglican church in Brighton, England, dating from the mid-Victorian era. It is located on Lewes Road in the Round Hill area of the city, northeast of the city centre and approximately 1.1 miles (1.8 km) north of the seafront. It is the largest church in Brighton by capacity and is noted for its ornate interior.

== Selecting the site ==
Although the church was built between 1872 and 1875 and consecrated on 1 May 1875, its founding was closely connected with the former Vicar of Brighton, Reverend Henry Michell Wagner, who had served the town from 1824 until his death in 1870. He had been responsible for the construction of several churches during his period of office, including St Peter's which later became the town's parish church. At the time of his death, he was planning the construction of another and had set aside £3,000 from his personal wealth, but had not decided on a location or any other details.

Wagner's son, Arthur, had been ordained in 1850. When his father died, Arthur Wagner inherited his wealth and set out to build a church both to commemorate him and to fulfil the plans he had towards the end of his life. To achieve this he convened with his half-brothers Joshua and Henry and decided on a site. The area chosen was largely under construction at the time, with large numbers of small terraced houses for poorer people being built to fill the space around the Lewes Road. Some of this development was funded by Arthur Wagner himself, and as neither this area nor the nearby Round Hill district had a proper church, it was considered appropriate to finance and oversee the building of a church at the same time. (A small temporary church which had been built on a nearby street became a school when St Martin's Church opened.)

One action the Revd Henry Wagner had taken before his death was the creation of a "building committee", consisting of other prominent members of the local clergy. The three Wagners offered this committee a choice between constructing a new church on a site chosen by the committee members - in which case only the original £3,000 set aside for the project would be granted, with the committee paying for any work beyond this - and accepting a site chosen by the Wagners, in which case the brothers would bear the full cost. The committee decided to allow the Wagners to choose the site themselves; accordingly, a position on the west side of Lewes Road, just north of the bottom of Elm Grove, was selected.

== Construction ==
The first bricks were laid in October 1872. A building contractor named Jabez Reynolds, son of Jabez Reynolds senior who had built about 1,000 houses including many significant buildings in Brighton and Hove, including the Cliftonville area of neighbouring Hove in the 1850s and 1860s, was chosen for the building work, while the architect was George Somers Clarke, a long-standing friend of the Wagner family: his father had been Clerk of the Vestry (the equivalent of a modern-day parochial church council) of Brighton since 1830, and had provided support to Rev. Henry Wagner during periods of tension between different sects and groups within the Vestry.

Clarke (junior) studied under the prominent architect Sir George Gilbert Scott, and his other projects included a collaboration with J. T. Micklethwaite on the design of the new chancel at St. Peter's, the clerestory at St Nicholas, work on Chichester Cathedral and an 8-year surveying role at St Paul's Cathedral, London.

== Design ==
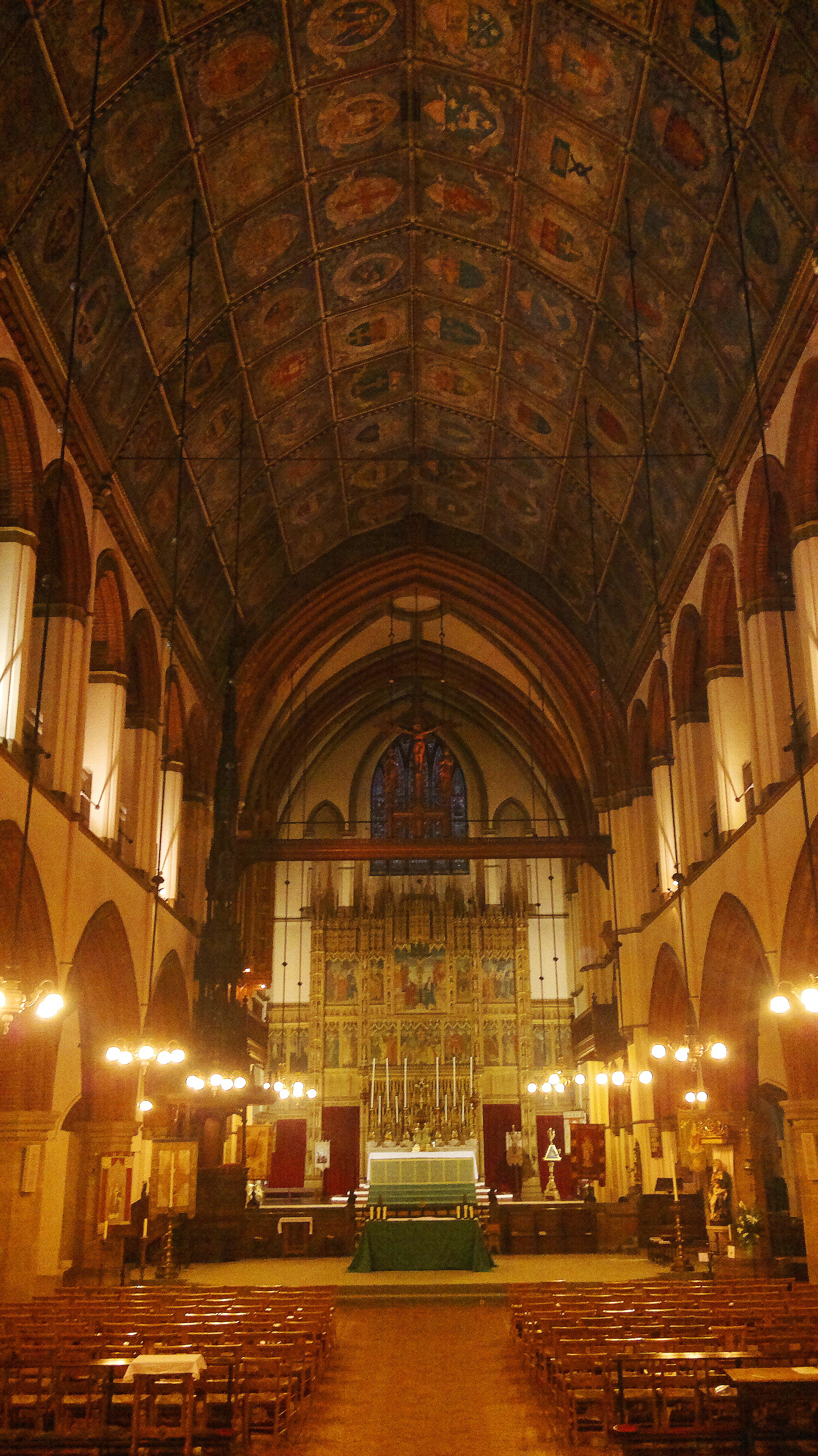
Interior view of the church

The exterior of St Martin's reflects the Gothic Revival interpretation of the Early English style associated with 13th century churches. Its most notable exterior feature is its considerable height, accentuated by the modest height of the majority of the surrounding buildings; brown brick, offset in some places with red, predominates on the outside, and the layout of the church is standard: an aisled nave with chapels on each side, and a chancel. A saddleback tower was included in the original plans but never built: a small bell-arch with a single bell was built instead, towards the north end. The church is on a north–south (liturgical east-liturgical west) alignment parallel with the Lewes Road.

The church floor lies six feet below street level, creating an architectural illusion of being larger internally and from the entrance there is an unimpeded view across the nave and into the chancel. Octagonal stone columns topped by brick arches separate the aisles from the nave; above these arches are a series of clerestory windows. A large series of stained windows dominates the west wall. A series of 144 painted shields adorn the nave ceiling, representing the Anglican missionary dioceses founded within 100 years of the church.

Although the marble altar is not original, dating from 1949, the large reredos above it is. It consists of 20 pictures and 69 statues, all of which were carved in the German town of Oberammergau, noted worldwide for its woodcarving tradition. The original pulpit, surmounted by a unique canopy tapering to 55 feet and dating from 1880, also remains: this, and the font in the raised entrance area, are decorated with materials from the collection of Henry Wagner. The base of the pulpit contains olive wood collected from the Mount of Olives; and the font, built of Sussex marble and installed in 1907, contains a variety of other stones and marble from sites such as Cairo and Pompeii, brought back to England by Wagner himself during his lifetime.

== Consecration, opening and later events ==
The Bishop of Chichester consecrated the church on 1 May 1875 and the vicar in charge of the temporary church nearby, the Revd R. I. Salmon, was appointed to the perpetual curacy of the new church by the Revd John Hannah, Fr Wagner's successor as Vicar of Brighton.

Later in 1875, St Martin's was granted its own parish: that of Brighton The Resurrection. This covers parts of the Lower Bevendean, Queen's Park, Round Hill and South Moulsecoomb areas.

The Lady chapel was improved in 1925, the 50th anniversary of the consecration, as a memorial to Fr Wagner, using money raised through a special collection. At the same time, part of the reredos was replaced.

The church was closely connected with the former Preston Barracks, situated further up the Lewes Road in the north of the parish. A gallery was built on the east side of the chancel for troops and members of military bands to participate in services; also, two different regiments erected memorials to comrades killed in the Siege of Khartoum in 1884 and 1885.

== Organ ==
The organ at St Martin's Church was built between 1875 and 1888 by the London-based organ building firm of Hill & Sons, and is housed in an incomplete case designed by Somers Clarke which complements the reredos. With 29 stops over three manuals and pedals, its voicing is influenced by Hill's time in Germany and capable of most repertoire. The Institute of Organ Studies has described it as "outstanding", and noted its historical importance for being in almost totally original condition. Since 2015 the Organist has been Mr Nic Robinson.

== Present ==
The church is a Grade II* listed building, defined as a "particularly significant building of more than local interest". As of September 2022, it was one of 72 Grade II* listed buildings, and 1,220 listed buildings of all grades, in the city of Brighton and Hove. The church maintains its Catholic style of liturgy and is often involved with other churches of the Wagner dynasty in group events.

== See also ==
- Grade II* listed buildings in Brighton and Hove
- List of places of worship in Brighton and Hove
