= Morton, West Lindsey =

Village and civil parish in Lincolnshire, England

Coordinates: 53.416368°N 0.785043°W

Morton
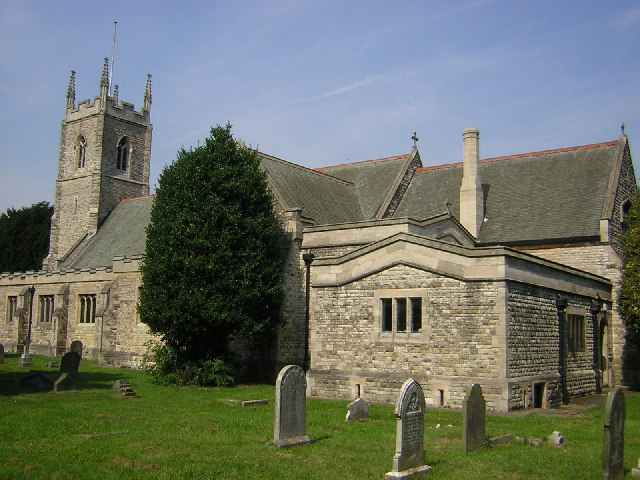
- St Paul's Church, Morton

- Location within Lincolnshire
- Population: 1,325 (2011)
- OS grid reference: SK808917
  - London: 135 mi (217 km) S
- Civil parish: Morton
- District: West Lindsey
- Shire county: Lincolnshire
- Region: East Midlands
- Country: England
- Sovereign state: United Kingdom
- Post town: Gainsborough
- Postcode district: DN21
- Police: Lincolnshire
- Fire: Lincolnshire
- Ambulance: East Midlands
- UK Parliament: Gainsborough

Morton is a suburban village and civil parish in the West Lindsey district of Lincolnshire, England. The population at the 2011 census was 1,325. It is 1 mile (1.6 km) north of Gainsborough on the River Trent and forms part of a built-up area with the town.

Morton is listed in the 1086 Domesday Book as "Mortune", with four households. It was a township of Gainsborough parish until 1846, when the first church, dedicated to Saint Paul, opened in the village. The church then became a chapelry, until 1866, when Morton was created a civil parish.

The Grade II* listed church is dedicated to Saint Paul. The current building dates from 1890 to 1891 and was built to the designs of J. T. Micklethwaite and Somers Clarke, incorporating the tower of the church consecrated in 1846, which appears to have been re-faced. The width of the 1840s church decided the width of the nave of the current church. An 1890-91 building campaign was largely financed by the then Premier Baronet, Sir Hickman Becket Bacon, at a cost of £11,000. The church includes a chapel to Saint Hugh off the south aisle. Of note is the chancel carpet designed by William Morris and stained glass windows by Burne-Jones, executed by Morris & Co.

Morton Trentside Primary School was built in 1843 as a National school. It was enlarged in 1871, and an infant schoolroom was added in 1882. It became Morton County Primary School in 1947 and in 1985-86 moved to a new site near to Morton playing fields. It took its present name in September 1999.

The Manor House is a red-brick Grade II listed building dating from the mid-18th century with later alterations and additions, now part of an office complex.
