= Belmond Reid's Palace =

Hotel in Funchal, Madeira, Portugal

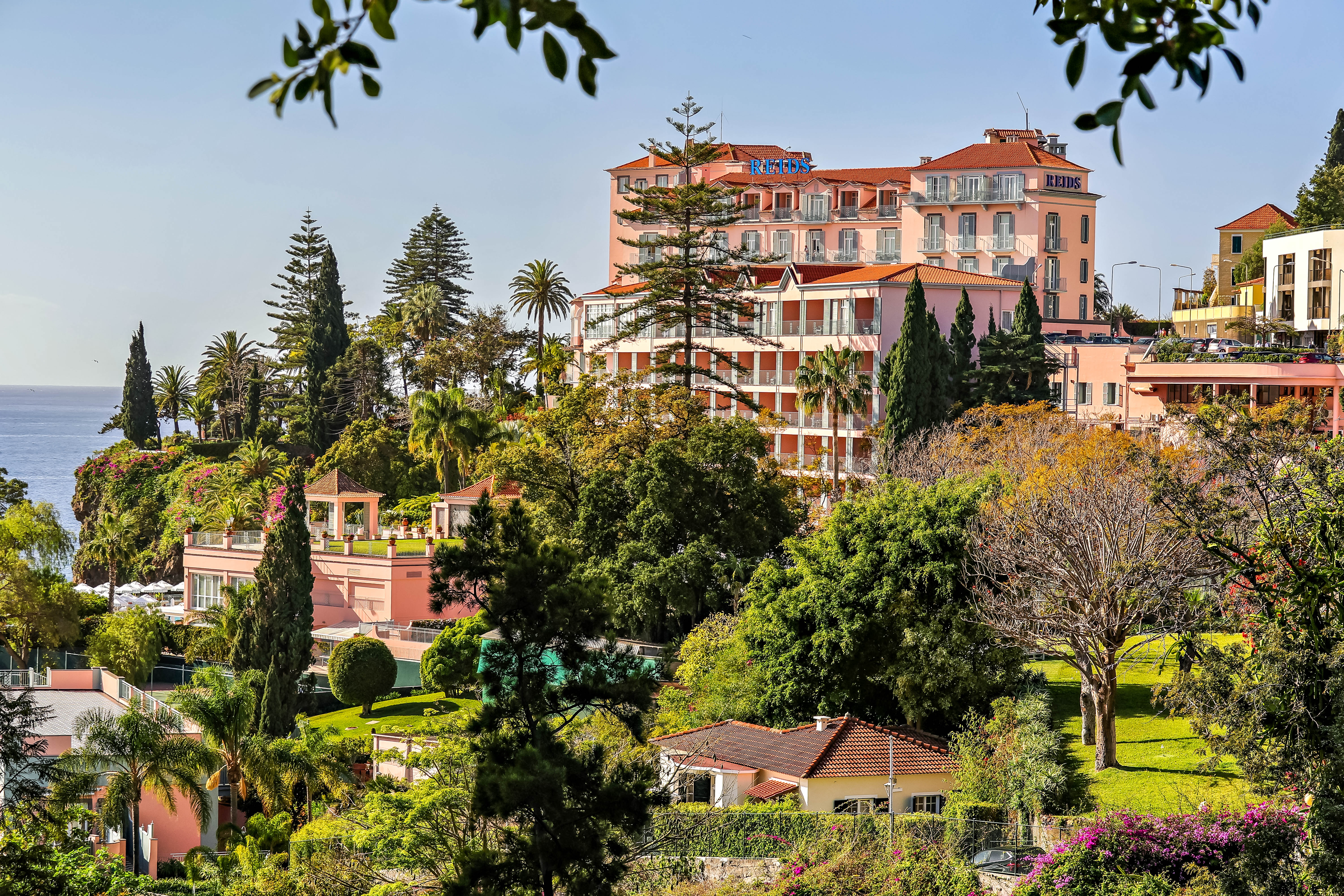
- View looking up to the main hotel building from the swimming pool.
- Interactive map of the Belmond Reid's Palace area

General information
- Location: Funchal, Madeira, Portugal
- Coordinates: 32°38′26″N 16°55′27″W
- Opening: November 1891
- Owner: Belmond Ltd.
- Operator: Belmond Ltd.

Design and construction
- Architects: George Somers Clarke & John Thomas Micklethwaite
- Developer: William Reid

Other information
- Number of rooms: 128
- Number of suites: 35

Website
- www.reidspalace.com

Belmond Reid's Palace (a.k.a. Reid's Palace) is a historic hotel located to the west of Funchal Bay in Madeira, Portugal, in an imposing position looking out over the Atlantic Ocean. The hotel has sloping gardens. The hotel's complex include more than 40,000 square meters of space designed as a subtropical botanical garden.

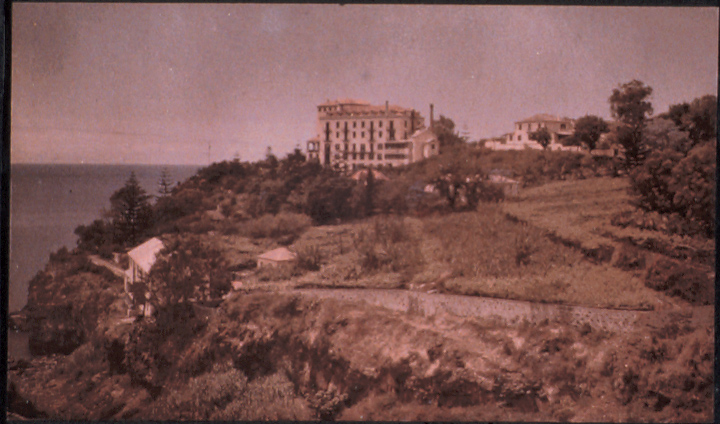
Early colour photograph of Reid's Hotel and the surrounding landscape from Funchal, Madeira, by Sarah Angelina Acland, c. 1910

== History ==
William Reid, the son of a Scottish crofter, originally arrived in Madeira in 1836. He hired out quintas to wealthy invalids and moved on to hotels, but died before his Reid's hotel was completed.

The hotel was designed by the architects George Somers Clarke and John Thomas Micklethwaite. Reid’s two sons, William (Willy) and Alfred, brought their father’s project to fruition and the doors to Reid's Palace opened in November 1891, as the New Hotel, later became the New Palace Hotel, then Reid's Palace or just "Reid's". It was a luxury retreat combining Edwardian elegance with the latest comforts of the day.

The pioneer colour photographer Sarah Angelina Acland (1849–1930) stayed at the hotel during the early 20th century and took many photographs in and around the location of the hotel. The hotel had a darkroom for use by guests.

Famous guests over the years have included General Fulgencio Batista, Winston Churchill, Anthony Eden, David Lloyd George, deposed emperor Charles I of Austria, Józef Piłsudski, Roger Moore, Gregory Peck, the poet Rainer Maria Rilke, the missionary Albert Schweitzer, and dramatist George Bernard Shaw.

The Cinema Museum in London has film from 1936 of the hotel and its guests.

Reid's is particularly known for its tradition of serving afternoon tea on the terrace.

The hotel was acquired by Orient-Express Hotels Ltd., which changed its name to Belmond Ltd. on 10 March 2014. At that time the hotel changed its name to Belmond Reid's Palace.

Louis Vuitton Moet Hennessy (LVMH) purchased Belmond Ltd., the 40-year-old company that owns (inter alia) Belmond Reid's Palace, in a €2.8 billion deal which closed in April 2019 in a $3.2 billion final transaction.

== See also ==
- List of hotels
