= Flying syringe =

Genetically modified mosquito that injects vaccines into people

Flying syringe is a phrase that is used to refer to proposed, but not yet created, genetically modified mosquitoes that inject vaccines into people when they bite them.

== History ==
In the 1990s, Bob Sinden of Imperial College, London, and Julian Crampton of the University of Liverpool, developed this idea and filled three related patents between 1997 and 2003.

In 2008, the Gates Foundation awarded $100,000 to Hiroyuki Matsuoka of Jichi Medical University in Japan to do research on them, with a condition that any discoveries that were funded by the grant must be made available at affordable prices in the developing world. If Matsuoka proves that his idea has merit, he will be eligible for an additional $1 million of funding. The Washington Post referred to flying syringes as a "bold idea". In 2010, Japanese researcher Shigeto Yoshida modified mosquito saliva to deliver leishmania vaccines to mice, noting that vaccination by insect could be painless and cost-effective. Concerns have been raised about this approach, especially in regard to informed consent and medical safety.
