= Debra Humphris =

English academic, nurse

Debra Humphris CBE FRCP

Vice Chancellor of the University of Brighton
- In office 1 December 2015 – September 2024
- Preceded by: Julian Crampton
- Succeeded by: Prof Donna Whitehead

Personal details
- Education: St George's Hospital Medical School; University of London
- Occupation: Academic; nurse
- Salary: £250,179 (2021–22)

Debra Humphris is an English academic and nurse who was the vice chancellor of the University of Brighton from 2015 to 2024.

== Biography ==
As a registered nurse, Humphris worked at the South Thames regional health authority and St George's Hospital Medical School, where she conducted research for the Doctor of Philosophy degree. She received her PhD degree from the University of London in 1999 after defending her thesis, "The implementation of policy into clinical practice: the use of research evidence by doctors, nurses and therapists". After completing her education, Humphris became a professor of health care development at the University of Southampton, where she led the New Generation Project to evaluate the university's health care curriculum. In 2008, she became the pro vice chancellor for education and student experience at the University of Southampton.

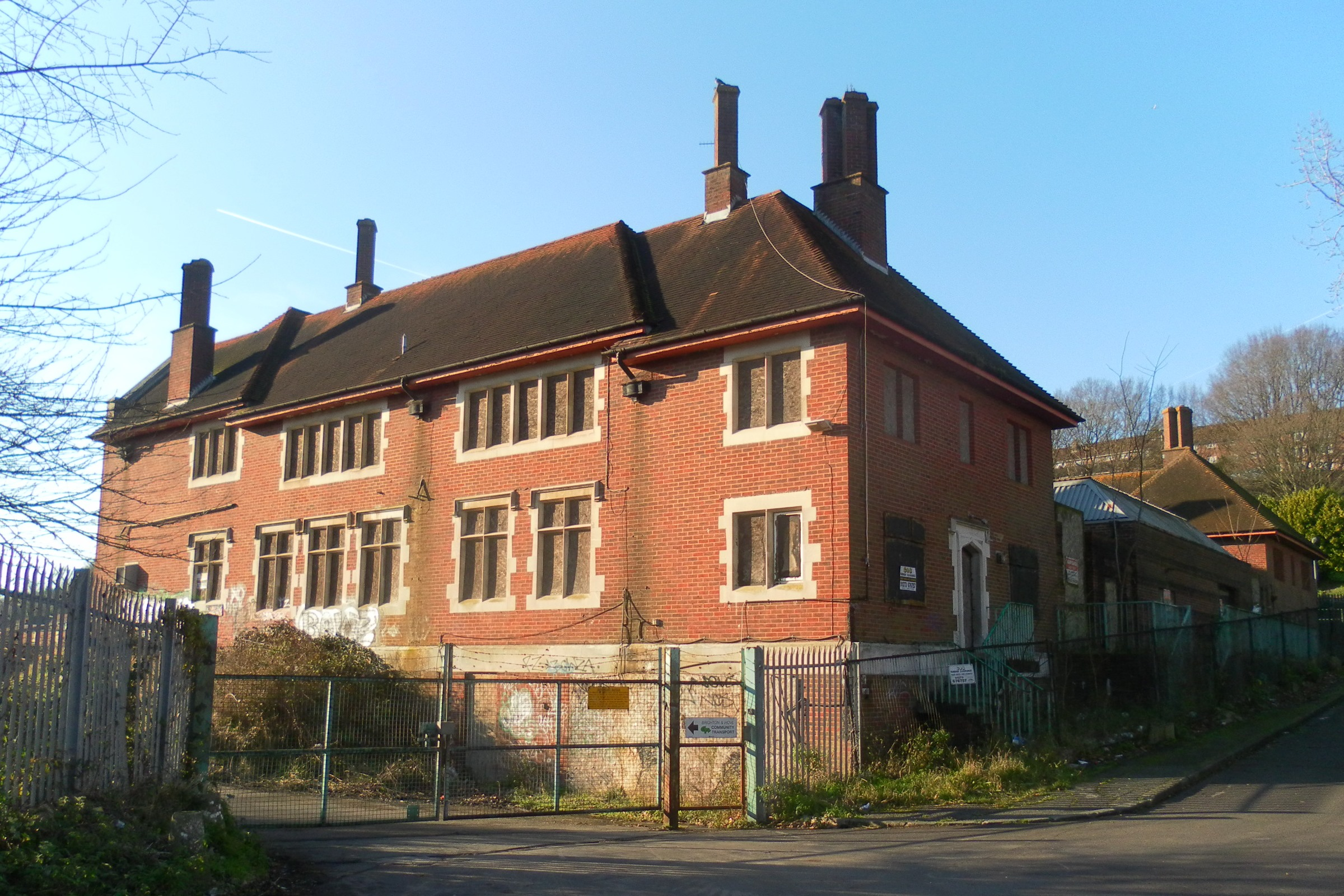
Preston Barracks in 2012

Humphris was appointed as pro rector for education at Imperial College London in 2012, and vice provost for education in 2013. She became the vice chancellor of the University of Brighton on 1 December 2015, succeeding the retiring Julian Crampton. She is one of few openly LGBT university leaders in the United Kingdom. As vice chancellor, Humphris advocated for the transformation of Preston Barracks, an 18th-century military installation, into new student residences and the university's business school. In 2018, she was elected as a fellow of the Royal College of Physicians. She was elected as the chair of the University Alliance, an association of 21 universities, in 2019.

Humphris was appointed Commander of the Order of the British Empire (CBE) in the 2023 Birthday Honours for services to education and the National Health Service.
