= Funchal Bay =

Coordinates: 32.6420°N 16.8953°W

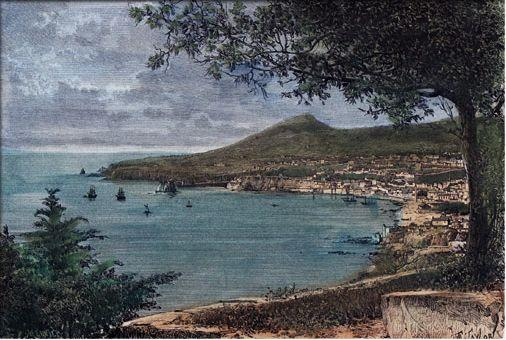
Funchal Bay in 1885, Madeira, view from the east

Funchal Bay is a large bay opposite the main city of Funchal on the island of Madeira, located in the North Atlantic Ocean off the west coast of Morocco in north Africa. Funchal has its harbour located within the bay.

Belmond Reid's Palace is located on the headland at the western end of the bay.

== Early photography ==
The pioneer colour photographer Sarah Angelina Acland (1849–1930) visited Madeira, staying at Reid's Palace during the early 20th century. She took photographs around the island, including many of Funchal Bay.

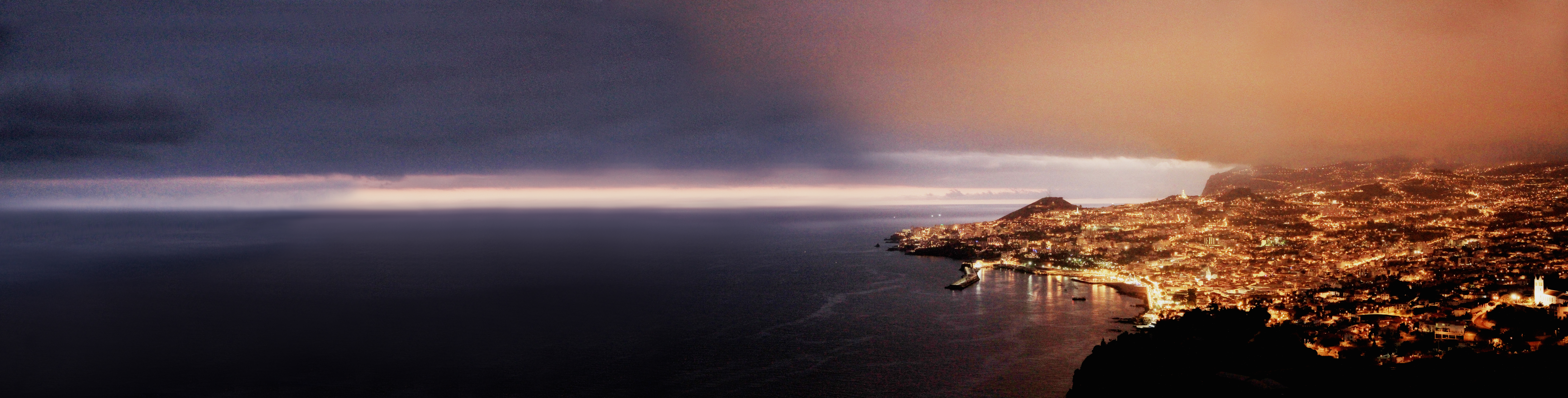
Panoramic view of Funchal Bay at sunset from Ponta do Garajau, looking west. Funchal's harbour can be seen in the distance.
