= Lewes Road =

Major road in Brighton, England

Lewes Road

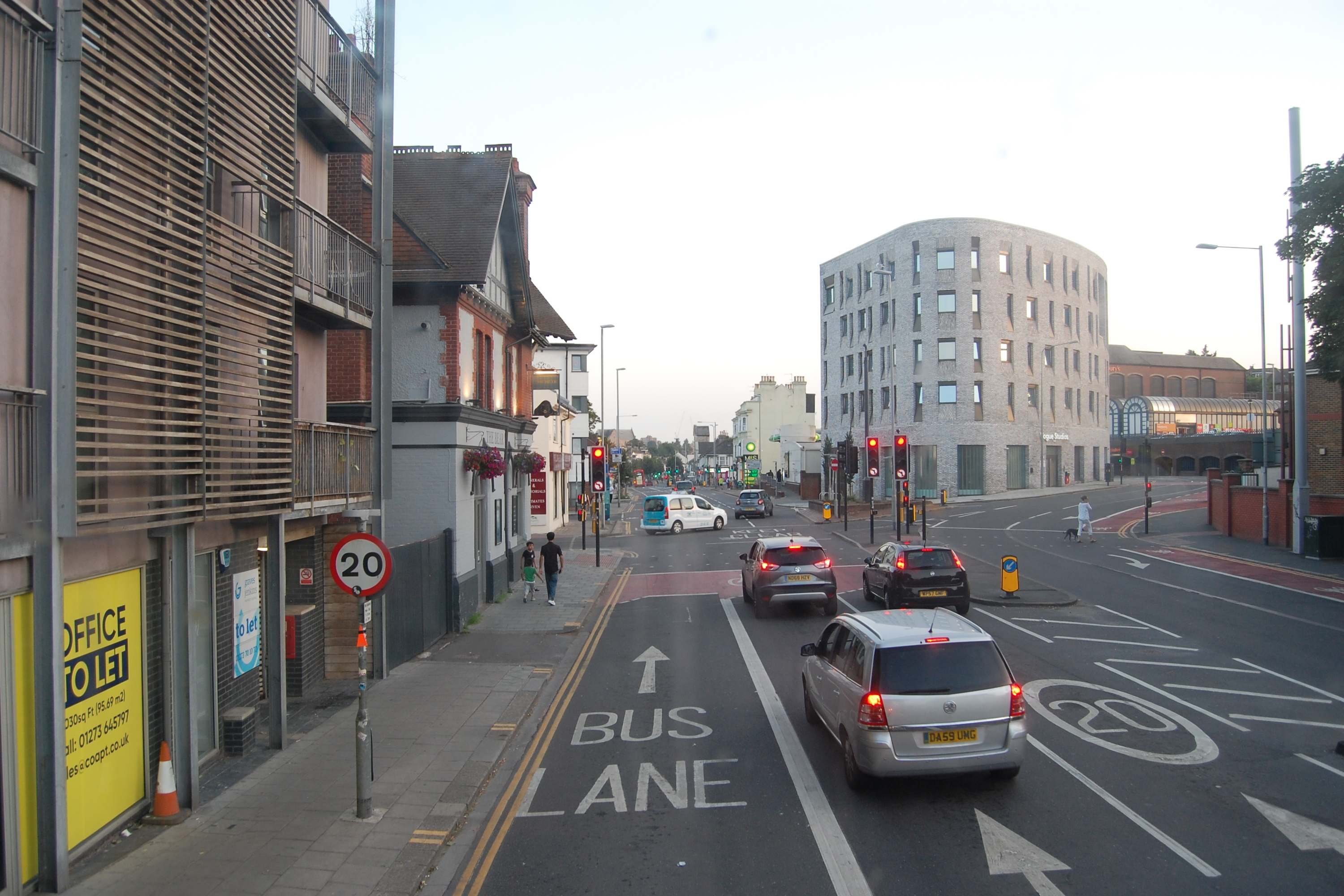
- A southward view along Lewes Road in 2019, looking towards the Vogue Gyratory

Route information
- Length: 3.46 mi (5.57 km)
- Existed: 1770–present

Major junctions
- West end: Southwick
- A27
- East end: Coldean

Location
- Country: United Kingdom

Road network
- Roads in the United Kingdom; Motorways; A and B road zones
← A269	→ A271

Lewes Road is a major road in the English seaside city of Brighton and Hove. It was part of the A27 cross-country trunk route until the Brighton Bypass took this designation in the 1990s; since then it has been designated the A270. The road runs northeastwards from central Brighton through a steep-sided valley, joining the A27 at the city boundary (formerly the borough boundary) (Note: In this article, the terms "borough boundary" and "city boundary" both refer to the northern limit of Lewes Road at the border with Lewes District in the county of East Sussex. Until 2000 Brighton was a Borough; thereafter it became part of the City of Brighton and Hove.) and continuing to Lewes, the county town of East Sussex.

The road originated in the 18th century as an alternative to the ancient drove road across the South Downs which was much used by fishwives bringing fish caught in Brighton to the market in Lewes. Lewes Road was turnpiked in 1770, and urban development spread rapidly along the road from the early 19th century.

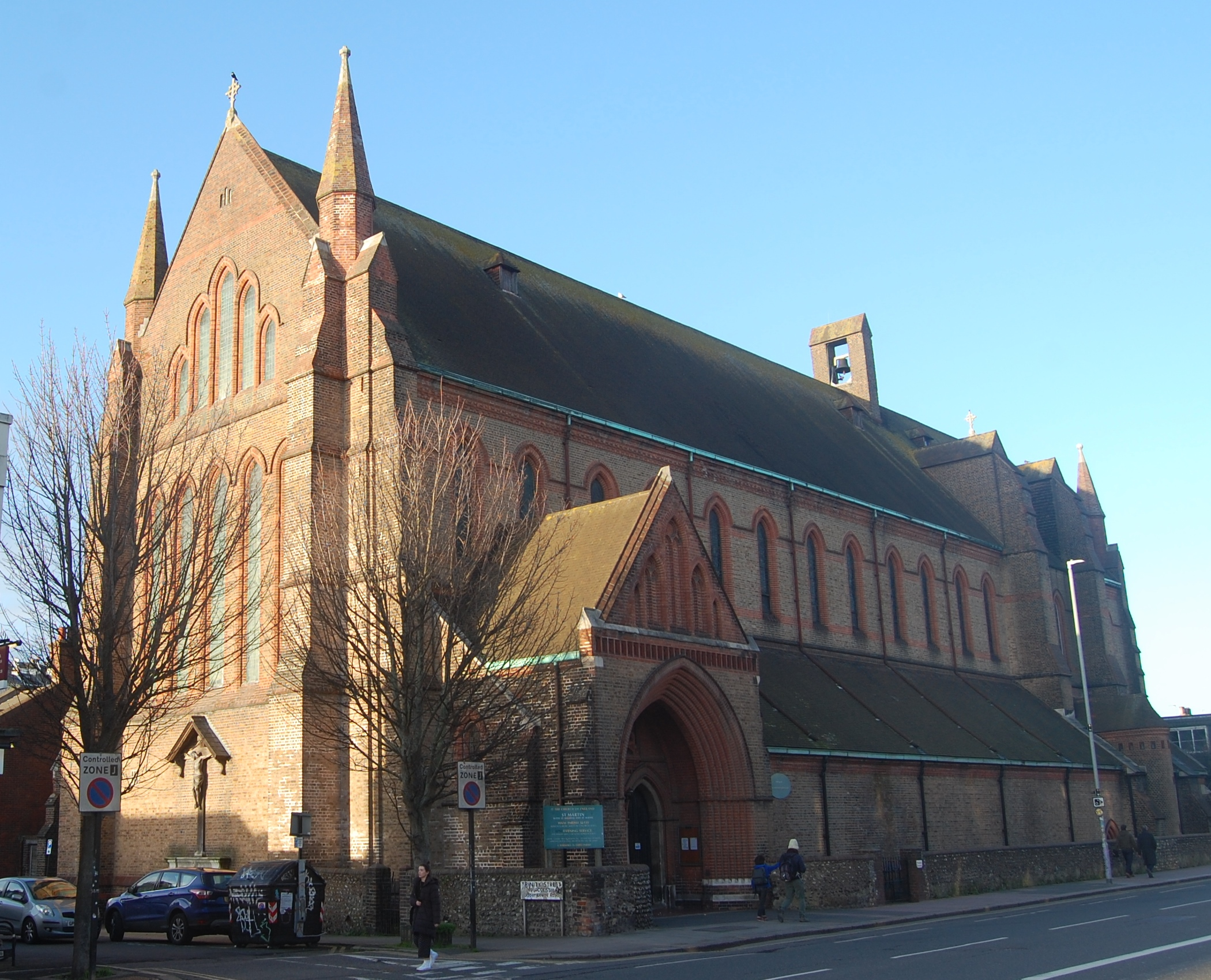
St Martin's Church dates from the 1870s.

Most of the road is built up on both sides, and many important buildings flank the 3.46-mile (5.57 km) road: one of Brighton's largest churches, a former barracks, many university buildings, a major bus depot (formerly the hub of Brighton's tram operations), The Keep archive centre and a large supermarket. Proximity to Brighton and Sussex Universities makes the area a centre for student life and accommodation, and a major redevelopment scheme started in 2018 to provide more buildings and facilities for the University of Brighton.

The road is a key bus corridor, but the Kemp Town branch railway's Lewes Road station was short-lived and its infrastructure no longer survives. Lewes Road has been altered and modernised several times since World War II and is now a dual carriageway along most of its length. Bus lanes, cycle paths and the Vogue Gyratory—"a fiendish maze of one-way systems, roundabouts and crossings", named after a pornographic cinema—add to the road's complexity.

== Description and designation ==
Lewes Road is one of the main entry routes into Brighton, and therefore gives "many visitors ... their first impression of the city." Sitting at the bottom of a dry valley with hills on each side, particularly alongside the northern part of the route, the road is sheltered and hidden from distant views. It is an important commercial and industrial area for its surroundings and the wider Brighton area, and is known as the city's "academic corridor" because of the presence of the city's two universities, Brighton and Sussex. The road's character changes substantially along its length, and the city council considers it to have three separate character areas: the central fringe (The Level to the Vogue Gyratory), largely Victorian in character with a mixture of housing and retail and an "uncoordinated urban realm"; the inner suburban area (Vogue Gyratory to Natal Road), dominated by the dual carriageway and "hostile to pedestrians", with council flats, privately rented terraced houses, industrial buildings and the large university buildings; and outer suburban, consisting mostly of rented housing, more university buildings and some open space, giving "a very green approach to the city".

Lewes Road is the longest continuously named road in Brighton: it runs for 3.46 miles (5.57 km) northwards to the city boundary from Waterloo Place, where it diverges from the A23 (London–Brighton road). This point, (Note: At 50.829°N 0.1339°W.) close to the rear of St Peter's Church, is at the southeast corner of The Level. The 8.05-acre (3.26 ha) area of marshy open land now known as The Level was the meeting point of three winterbournes, including one which occasionally surfaced along the dry valley where Lewes Road runs. It has been used for fairs, sport and recreation since the 18th century. The road forms the eastern boundary of The Level, then meets Union Road and Elm Grove at a major junction. Elm Grove is the main route to Brighton Racecourse; it originated as part of a Roman trackway which formed part of the ancient trackway across the South Downs to Lewes (Juggs Road), and was developed with housing from the mid-19th century. The next major junction is the Vogue Gyratory, where Upper Hollingdean Road, Upper Lewes Road (both of which link Lewes Road with Ditchling Road, another major route) and Bear Road meet the Lewes Road. This was the northern boundary of Brighton until the borough was expanded in 1928; to the north and east was the parish of Preston, and the residential area east of Lewes Road and north of Bear Road (now known as the Bear Road area) was historically known as East Preston. In this area there is also some industrial development on the east side of the road, and the University of Brighton has several buildings. North of this, the Moulsecoomb council estate was built in several phases in the mid-20th century alongside the Lewes Road. Further north, the road passes the east side of a deep valley originally known as "Cold Dean", between Hollingbury and Stanmer. Scattered farm cottages near Lewes Road were the only buildings in the valley until Brighton Corporation developed it for council housing from 1950 as the Coldean estate.

The designation of Lewes Road within the British road numbering system has a complex history. For many years the A26 road ran from Maidstone, the county town of Kent, to Brighton, and the entire length of Lewes Road within Brighton bore this number. The A27 trunk road joined it at the Upper Lewes Road junction. (Note: At 50.8367°N 0.1251°W.) When the A26's southern terminus was moved to Newhaven, the whole of Lewes Road took the A27 designation: the section between Upper Lewes Road and The Level became a spur of the A27. The Brighton Bypass was completed in 1995, and Lewes Road took the number A270 as far as the bypass.

== History ==
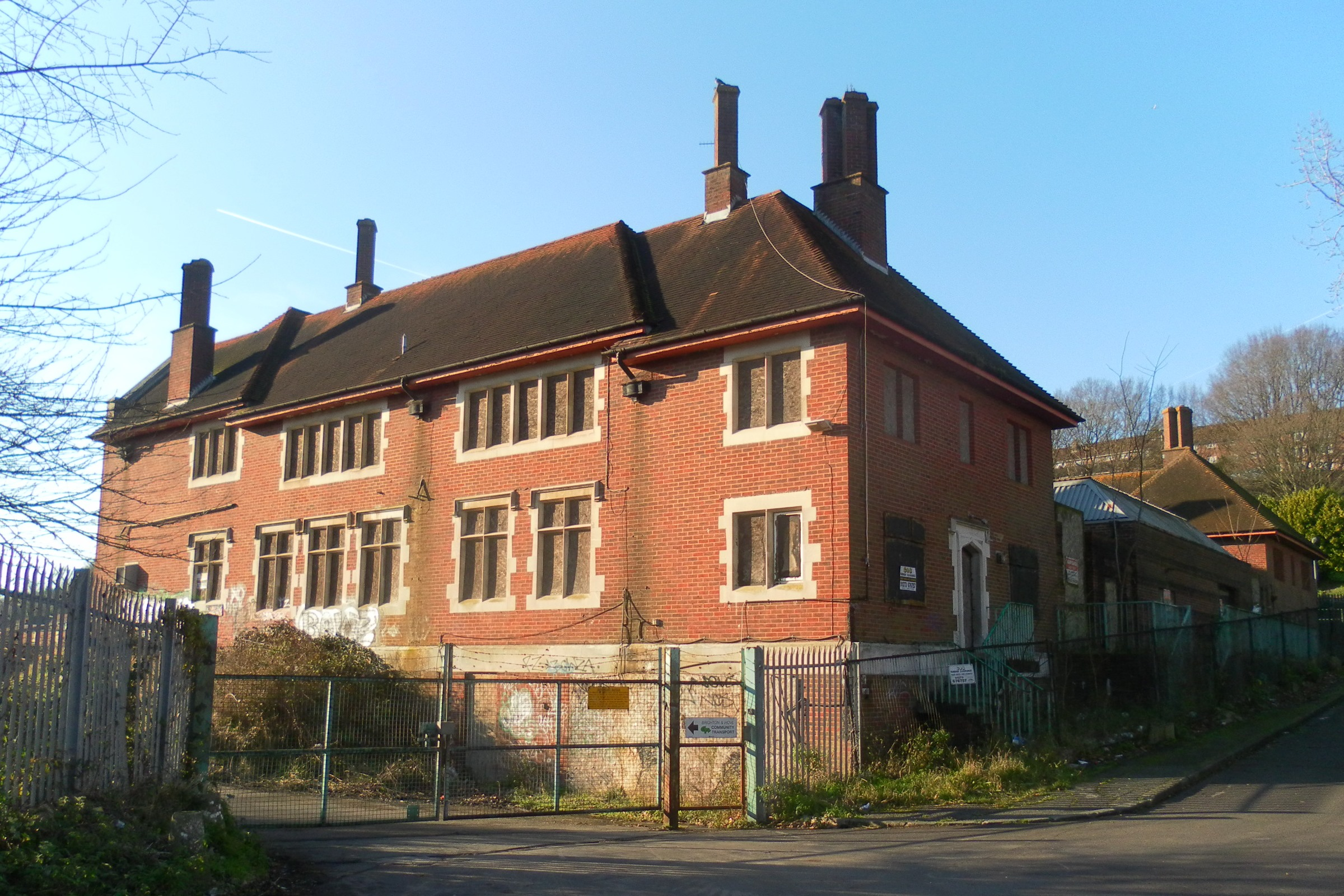
Preston Barracks was built in the late 18th century alongside Lewes Road but was redundant by the 21st century.

A route has existed for centuries between Brighton and Lewes, the county town of East Sussex (and historically of Sussex as a whole), which is 7 1/2 miles (12.1 km) to the northeast. The historic route to Lewes ran in a more easterly direction on a drove road across the South Downs; it still exists as footpaths and byways. It was travelled regularly by the wives of Brighton fishermen, who carried the fish to market at Lewes: fishermen were known locally as "jugs" or "juggs", and the eastern section of the old route is called Juggs Road. It lay further south, followed a different valley and entered Lewes at Southover. The present road, which takes a north–northeasterly course along a valley from the centre of Brighton as far as Falmer, existed by the 18th century and became a turnpike in 1770; the toll gate at the Lewes end survives, but that at Brighton—near the Bear Inn—is no longer standing. An intermittent stream flowed along this valley, and the Wellesbourne (another intermittent river which flowed along the London Road valley) met it at the area now known as The Level. Before it was landscaped in the 19th century this was a swampy, flood-prone marsh.

Development of Lewes Road started at the south end, closest to the centre of Brighton, and was confined to the east side at first because the open ground of The Level was to the west. Until the creation of "Greater Brighton" in 1928, when the borough of Brighton absorbed territory from several surrounding parishes, the borough boundary was at Bear Road. (Note: At 50.8378°N 0.1241°W.) North of this was the parish of Preston, which was wholly absorbed by Brighton in 1928. This section remained undeveloped (apart from Preston Barracks) until the 1890s, when the area east of Lewes Road was developed with housing and industry. Further north, the road was flanked on both sides by undeveloped downland. The present Moulsecoomb area was an outlying part of Patcham parish, with scattered farm cottages and a 16th-century manor house, and the land south of Moulsecoomb and east of Lewes Road now covered by the Bevendean estate was in Falmer parish. In 1940 it was "a small settlement with an 18th-century farmhouse".

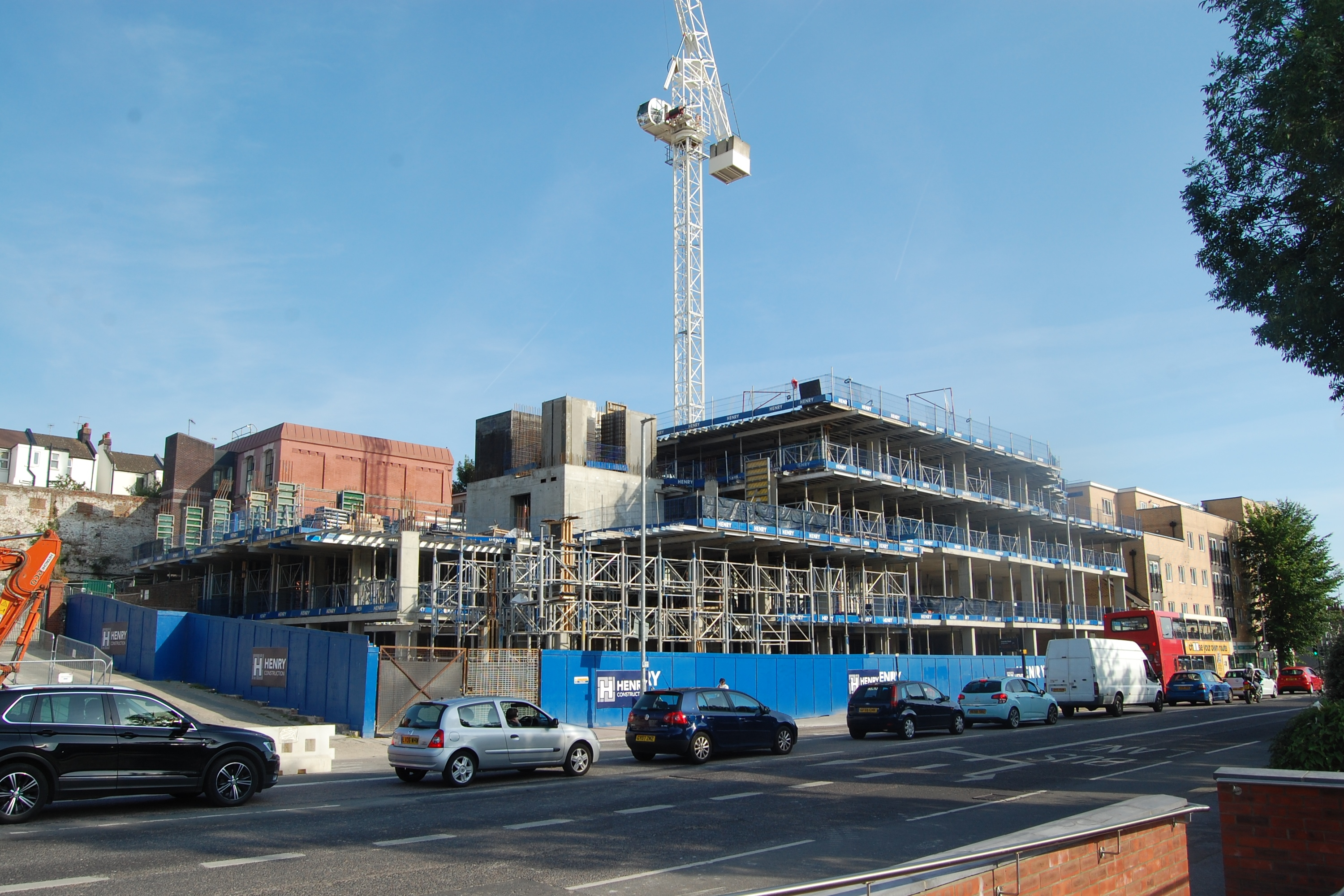
Work on the University of Brighton's expansion began in 2018 and is seen here in July 2019.

Preston Barracks was built on open land on the west side of Lewes Road in 1793–1795, when war was threatening in Europe. Facilities included accommodation, a hospital and a riding school, and "a small community grew up" on the east side of the road in connection with the barracks. Much of the barracks site, which was latterly owned by the Ministry of Defence, was redundant by the 1980s. The southern part of the site was bought by a developer and became the Pavilions retail park, whose first superstores opened in 1989. Halfords, B&Q, Comet and Harveys Furniture were among the early tenants. Brighton and Hove City Council bought the rest in 2002 and unveiled a £150 million redevelopment scheme in 2016 in conjunction with the University of Brighton. This developed into the "Big Build" scheme. An earlier proposal for a mixed residential and commercial development, announced in 2003, foundered during the 2008 financial crisis; an alternative scheme was put forward by the University of Brighton in September 2009. The "Big Build" project started in 2018. The scheme provided five halls of residence for 800 university students, an academic building, gymnasium, student union building, car park and a pedestrian bridge above Lewes Road connecting the various buildings. Work on this, the final part of the scheme, started in January 2022, and the bridge opened in September 2022. As part of the £300 million scheme, the university announced in late 2021 that it would close its three sites at Eastbourne and consolidate their facilities at Lewes Road.

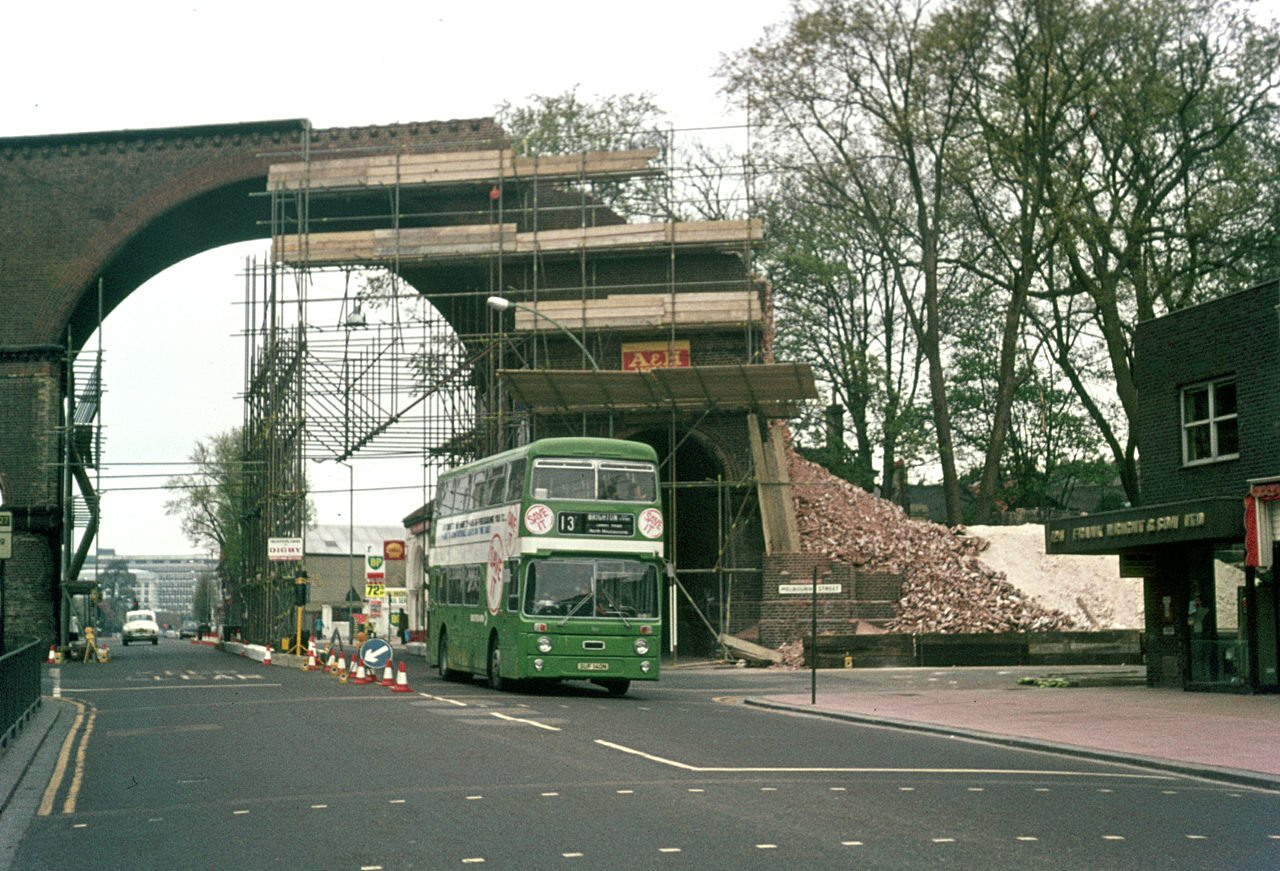
The viaduct across Lewes Road was demolished in 1976.

Brighton's first piped water was supplied from a small pumping station on the west side of Lewes Road in 1834. It was expanded in 1853 but was superseded by the new Goldstone Bottom pumping station in Hove in 1866. Attempts to restart pumping work at Lewes Road in 1896 were unsuccessful because the supply had become polluted, and the works was demolished in 1903. Soon after this, in 1910, industrial development began nearby with the opening of Allen West & Co. Ltd's first factory near the junction with Natal Road. This electrical engineering company expanded to become one of Brighton's largest employers, and it opened several factories along Lewes Road in the interwar period. Two munitions factories were also established alongside the road by 1915.

Brighton's first council houses were built in the Elm Grove area in 1897, but only in the 1920s with the commencement of the Moulsecoomb estate did significant council house building start. The development of Moulsecoomb was part of a council policy of "providing good family housing in the more healthy environments away from the town centre". Wartime restrictions and bomb damage in central Brighton meant that by the 1950s much more new housing was needed, and the council's policy of developing outlying estates resumed. Large developments of houses and flats took place in Moulsecoomb—expanding it to cover land on both sides of Lewes Road—Bevendean, at the south end of Moulsecoomb, and Coldean, northwest of Lewes Road.

Between 1869 and 1976 Lewes Road was crossed by a railway viaduct carrying the Kemp Town branch line above the valley floor. It was 180 yards (160 m) long, 50 feet (15 m) high and had 14 arches, and contributed to the substantial cost of the 1.4-mile (2.3 km) line: £100,000 at 1864 prices, the year the line was authorised. The opening ceremony for the line, on 6 August 1869, started with the ceremonial laying of the final brick of the viaduct. The west end of the viaduct immediately adjoined the platform at Lewes Road station. Passenger trains and goods trains ceased in 1932 and 1971 respectively, and Brighton Borough Council bought all the infrastructure including the viaduct, which was mostly demolished in April 1976. The remaining arches at the western end were demolished in 1983 as part of the scheme to build the Vogue Gyratory and the Sainsbury's supermarket, which has a series of arches on its façade to commemorate the viaduct.

In relation to politics, "Lewes Road" was the name of a ward within the Borough of Brighton between 1894 and 1983. In 1926, during the general strike of that year, tensions linked to the proposed operation of local tram services with volunteer labour came to a head in the Battle of Lewes Road on 11 May, when "vicious struggles" broke out between 4,000 strikers and police officers.

== Buildings ==
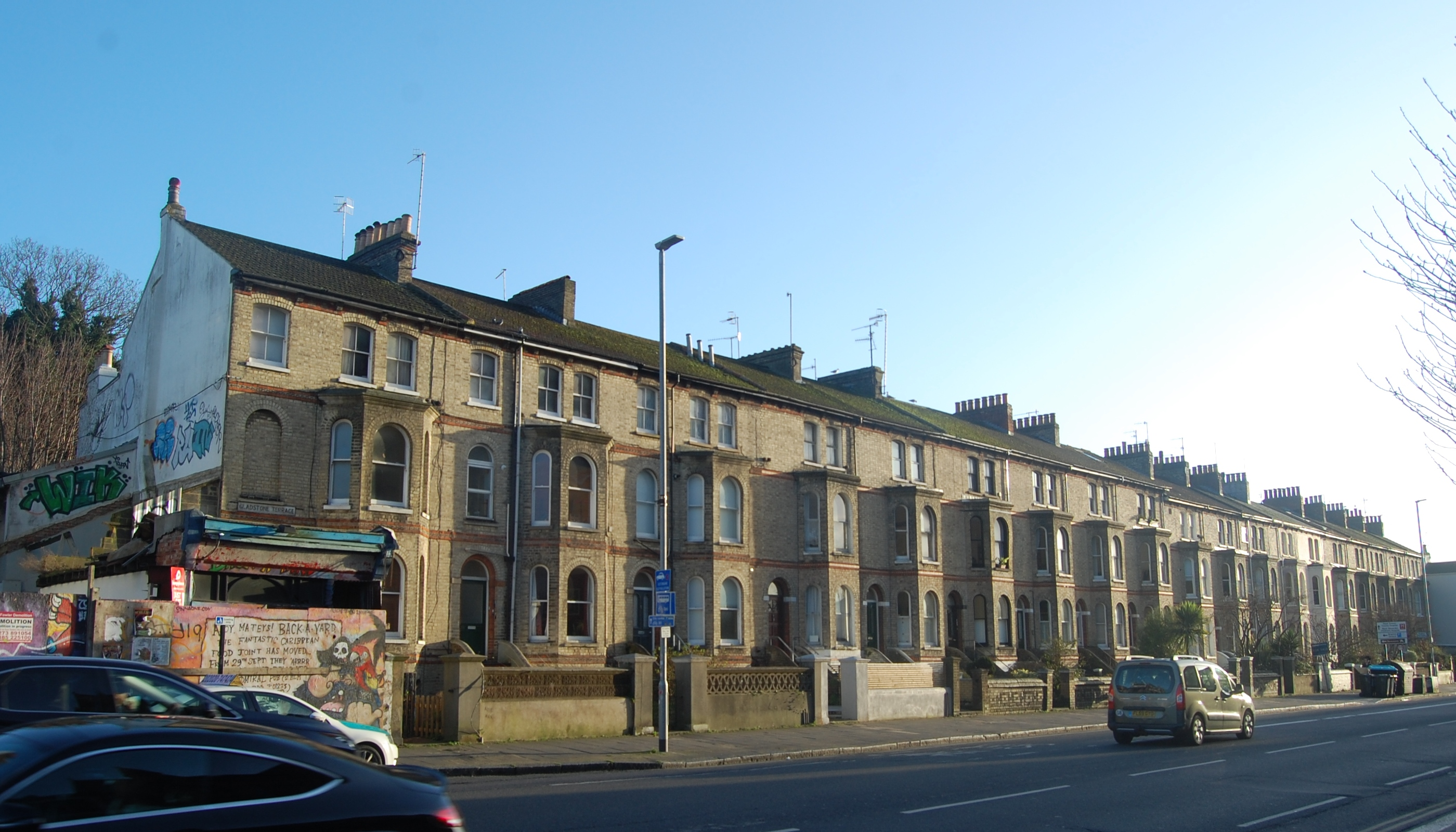
Gladstone Terrace was built in the 1860s.

Waterloo Place, where Lewes Road begins, was designed as a 14-house terrace in 1819 by Amon Wilds and his son Amon Henry Wilds. The southernmost pair survive alongside the A23; Lewes Road itself starts alongside the "brutal intrusion" of the Phoenix Building, part of the University of Brighton School of Art, which was designed in 1976 and which replaced the other 12 houses. Behind this is the site of Tamplin's Brewery (latterly the Phoenix Brewery), established as one of Brighton's main breweries in 1821. Only the adjacent pub (latterly called the Free Butt; now closed), built in the same year, and the Italianate brewery office of 1893 survive. Immediately to the north are the villas of Richmond Terrace—also designed by Wilds senior and junior in 1818, and an example of the speculative housing development which was rife in Brighton during the early 19th century. These houses are next to the former Brighton College of Technology, a Grade II-listed Jacobean Renaissance-style building of 1895 which was converted into flats in 2007. Hanover Crescent, one of several set-piece residential crescents in Brighton, was built between 1814 and 1823, again as a speculative development to the design of Amon and Amon Henry Wilds. Next to the crescent are the Percy and Wagner Almshouses, the only surviving almshouses in Brighton. When the first six were built in 1795, they "stood in open country", being the only buildings north of Old Steine on the turnpike. Six more were added in 1859 at the expense of the Vicar of Brighton Henry Michell Wagner and his sister Mary.

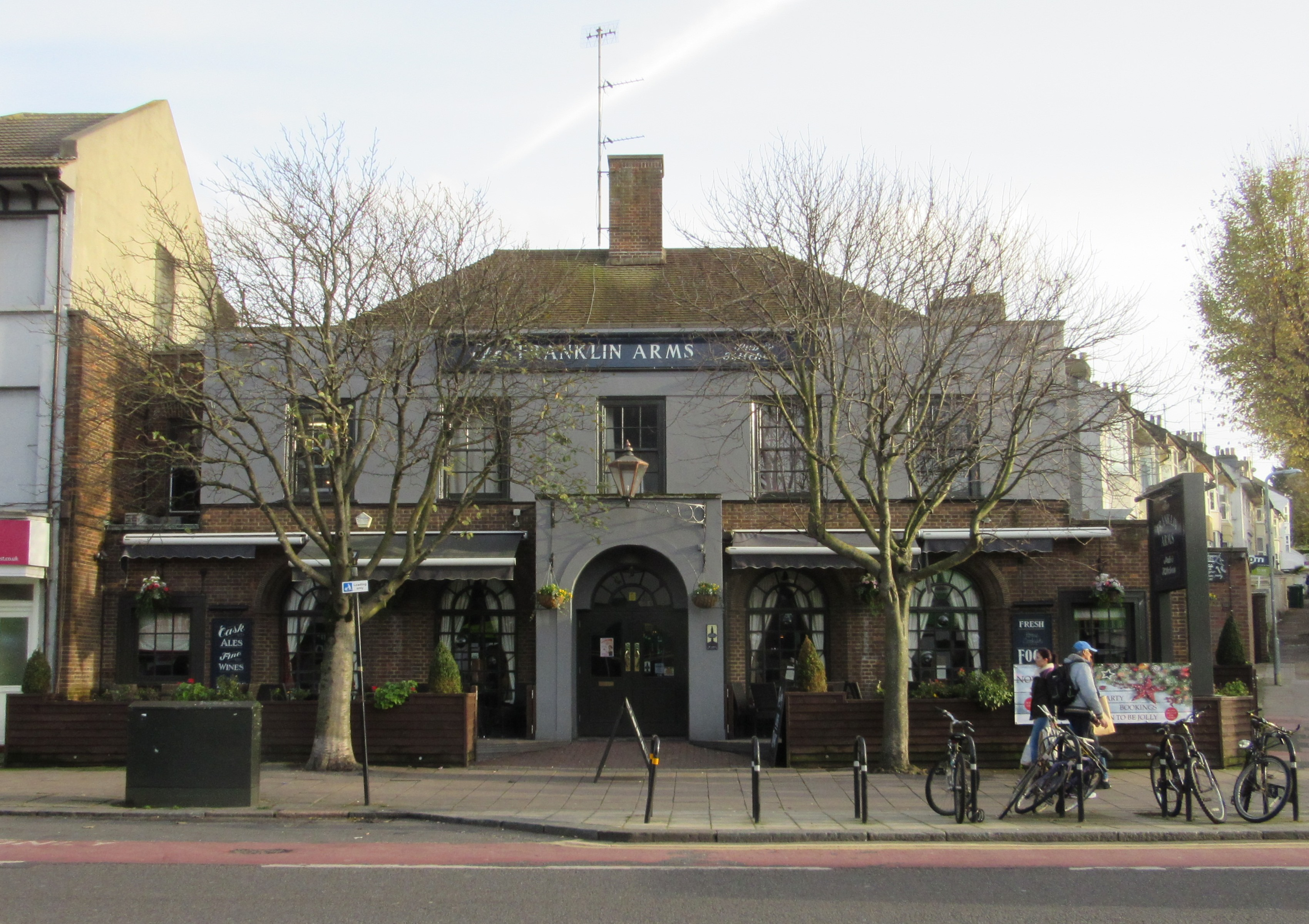
The Franklin Arms pub was rebuilt after wartime bombing.

North of the Elm Grove junction, the land on the west side of Lewes Road was common land until 1822, when it was sold to local entrepreneur James Ireland who established the Royal Gardens there. The large houses of Park Crescent was in turn built here from 1849. Densely built smaller streets west of Lewes Road and north of Park Crescent, such as Caledonian, Aberdeen and Inverness Roads, were built in the 1860s, as was the whole of the east side of Lewes Road as far as the present Vogue Gyratory. The most significant development on this side was the "impressive" gault brick Gladstone Terrace, dating from the late 1860s. Opposite is St Martin's Church, the largest church in Brighton by capacity. A cinema, originally the People's Picture Palace but latterly known as the Arcadia, stood nearby from 1910 until 1957; the local Labour Club stands on the site. On the east side, the Franklin Arms pub was destroyed by a bomb on 21 September 1940 and was rebuilt after the war. Another pub, the Gladstone, is nearby. Further north, near where the railway viaduct crossed the road, were the Lewes Road Congregational Church (1878) and its church hall of 1892, and the Connaught Institute (1879). Many shops line both sides of this section of the road: in 1985 Brighton Borough Council described Lewes Road as one of six "important shopping areas" in Brighton, subsidiary to the two "main [shopping] areas" of Churchill Square/Western Road/North Street and London Road.

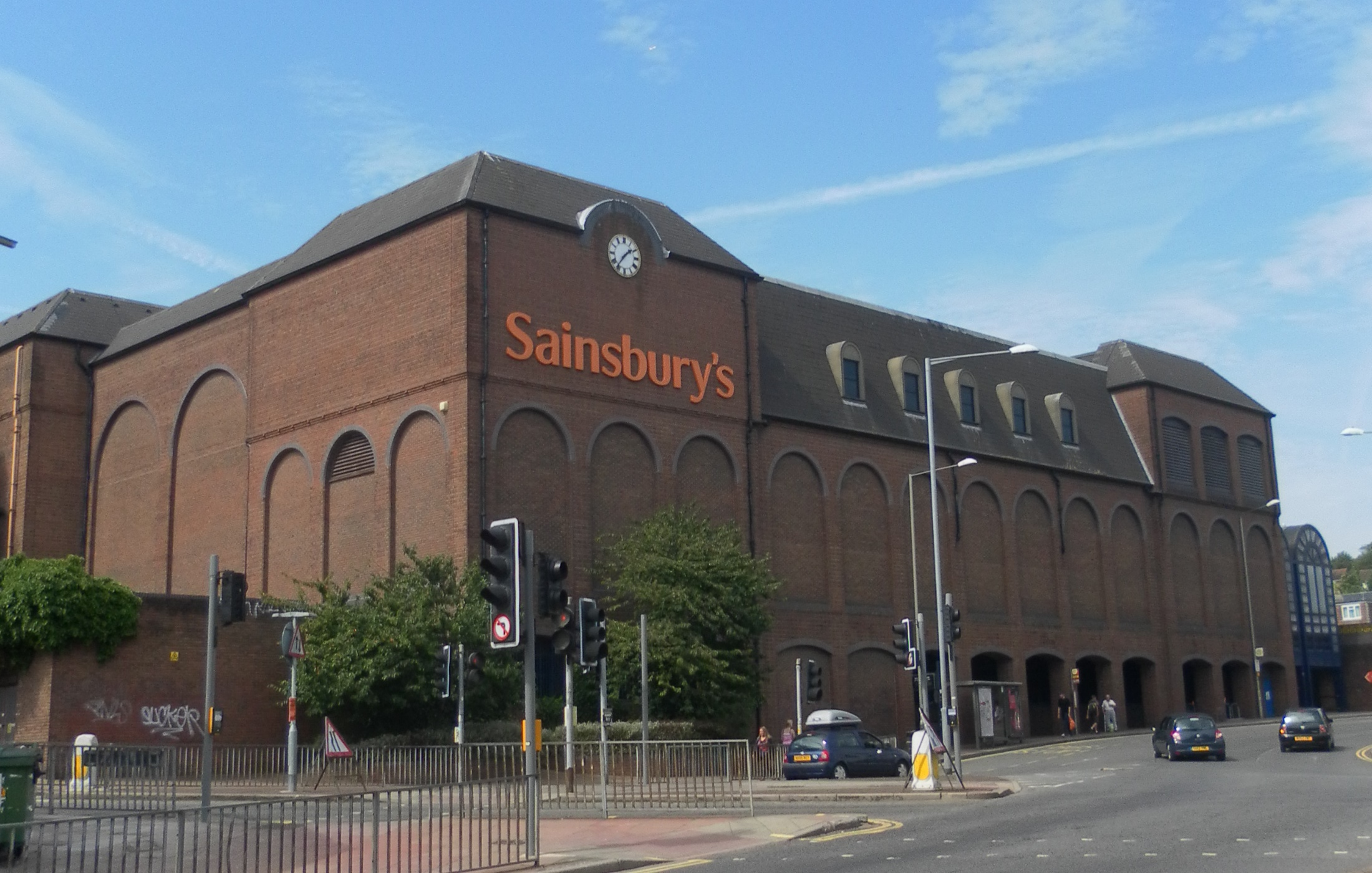
This large Sainsbury's supermarket was built in 1985.

The demolition of the viaduct and the construction of the Vogue Gyratory on its site brought great changes to this part of Lewes Road. The Vogue Cinema opened in 1937 as the Gaiety and was Art Deco in style. Its first renaming, to the Ace, took place in 1965. It was temporarily converted into a bingo hall three years later, but it reopened as a cinema in 1969 and became the Vogue two years later, specialising in pornographic films and striptease. In its last year (1979–80) it was called the Classic. The 1,500-seat venue, with its distinctive 50-foot (15 m) façade, was demolished soon afterwards as part of the wholesale redevelopment of the area. The site is now buried under the Vogue Gyratory. Behind the cinema, at the Upper Lewes Road junction, stood Cox's Pill Factory. It was built in the 1860s as the Brighton Steam Laundry, but the sons of Arthur H. Cox—who had patented a flavourless coating for pills—bought the building in 1910 and converted it into a factory in 1912. Pills were manufactured there until 1979; thereafter the building stood empty until a large Sainsbury's supermarket opened on the site in April 1985. A landmark clock which had been installed on the factory when it opened was reinstalled on the façade of the supermarket. On the northeast corner of the gyratory is the Bear Inn, a historic pub with 18th-century origins but since rebuilt. Its name derives from the bear-baiting which regularly took place at the pub. The inn gave its name to Bear Road and, by extension, the whole residential area north of Bear Road and east of Lewes Road.

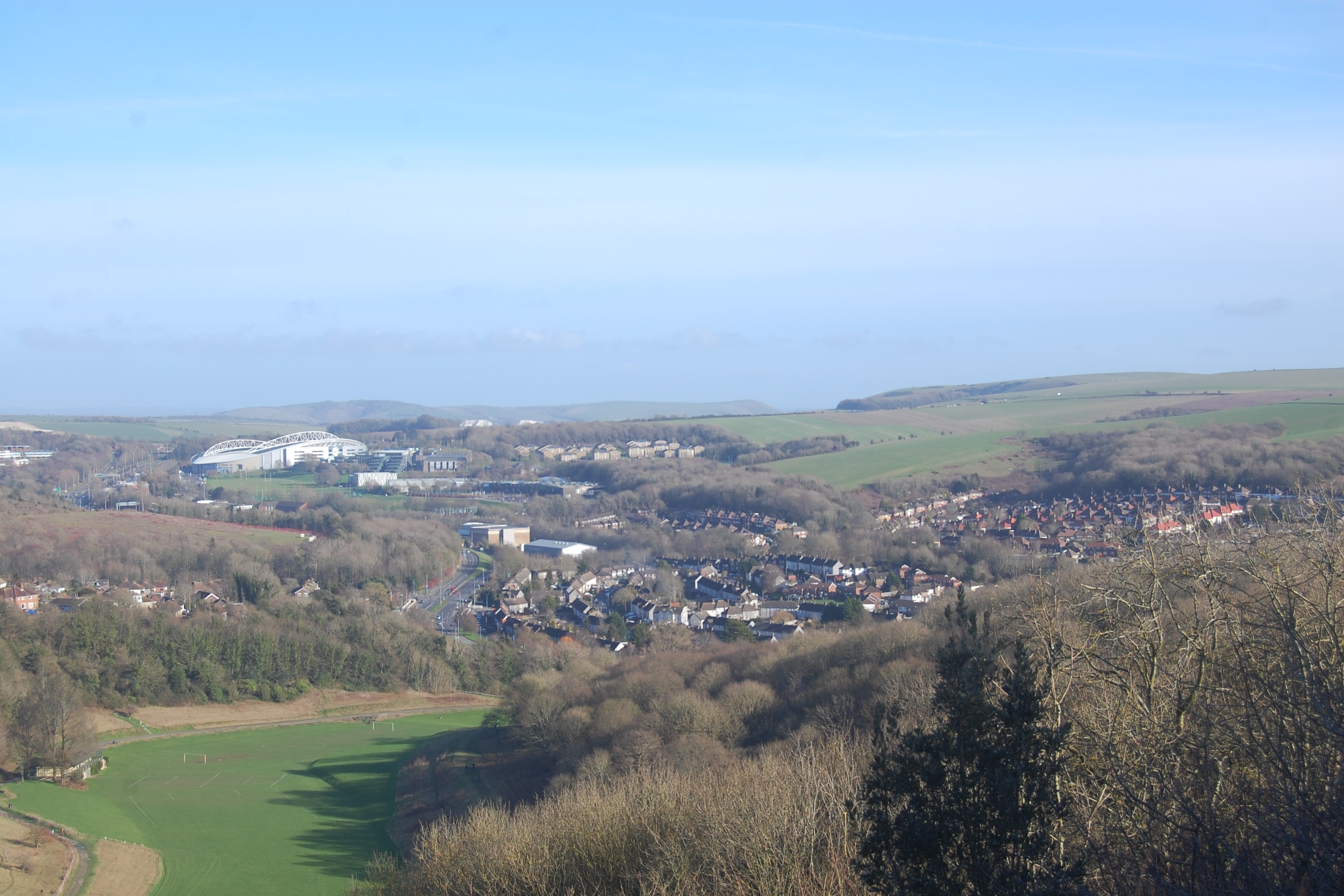
The housing of Moulsecoomb spreads to the east of Lewes Road, visible centre-left. Beyond is Falmer Stadium; Wild Park is bottom left.

North of the Vogue Gyratory, beyond the Church of Jesus Christ of Latter-day Saints and the Lewes Road depot of the Brighton & Hove bus company, many of the buildings are associated with the University of Brighton, whose "Big Build" project resulted in much rebuilding from 2018 onwards. The Preston Barracks site took up 17 acres (6.9 ha) of land on the west side of Lewes Road, but by 1990 only 5 acres (2.0 ha) remained in use by the Territorial Army and two original buildings survived. The large warehouse-style stores of the Pavilions Retail Park were in place by 1989, and the rest of the site has been developed by the university. Opposite, Mithras House—another University building—was built as a factory and design office by local electrical engineering company Allen West & Co. Ltd in 1966 but was sold soon afterwards to Brighton Polytechnic, as the university was then. Allen West had several other factories along this part of Lewes Road, but all have been demolished. The university's original, pre-"Big Build" accommodation along this stretch of Lewes Road consists of "a collection of utilitarian modern buildings" on both sides of the road. As well as Mithras House, there is the ten-storey Cockcroft Building (1962–63), the Aldrich Library (1994–1996) and the Huxley Building (2010).

Further north, the housing of Moulsecoomb, described in 1940 as "a model village", was "some of the earliest suburban council housing in the country" and now dominates both sides of Lewes Road. In the 1920s development stopped at The Highway, where The Avenue was later built to connect the Bevendean and East Moulsecoomb estates, and the land beyond was still farmed. South Moulsecoomb, commenced in 1923, was the earliest part; the denser North Moulsecoomb followed in 1926–30; East Moulsecoomb was started in 1935, just after the development of the adjacent Bevendean estate; and the Bates Estate or West Moulsecoomb, mostly 1950s and 1960s flats, took up land on the west side of Lewes Road. One older building survives on this side: Moulsecoomb Place, the Grade II-listed 16th-century manor house. It was bought by Brighton Corporation in 1925 and was occupied by its Parks and Recreation Department; it also housed various recreational facilities for the estate's residents, and served as the Moulsecoomb estate's first library, before being bought by the University of Brighton in 1993. Moulsecoomb's present library stands close by, opposite The Avenue. It was built in 1964 on the site of one of Moulsecoomb Place's lodges.

Close to the city boundary at the north end of Lewes Road are the Brighton Aldridge Community Academy, built in 2010–11 and set back from the road into the hillside, and The Keep (2011–2013), an archive and historical resource centre for East Sussex and the city of Brighton and Hove.

=== Churches ===
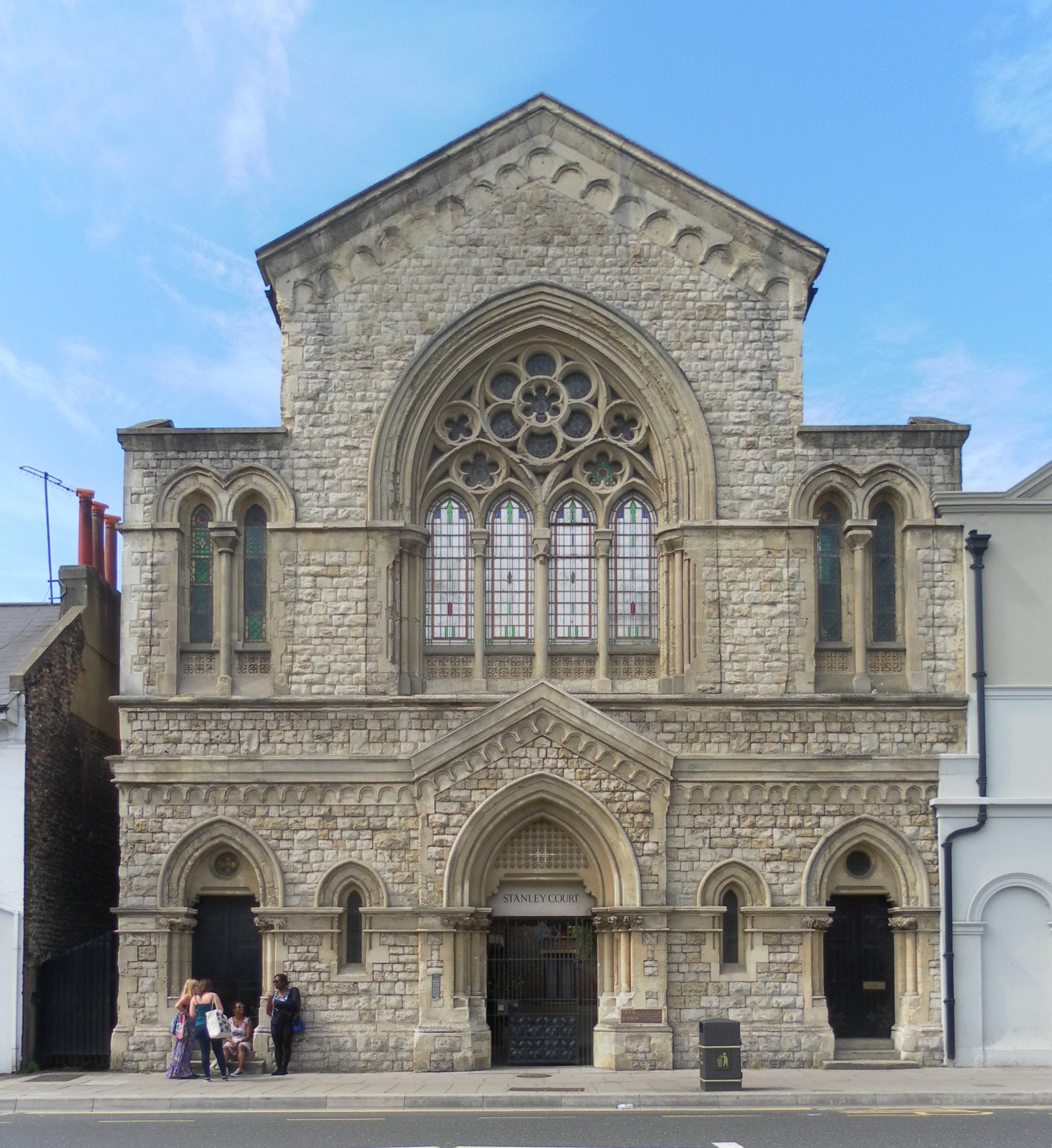
The original Lewes Road United Reformed Church is now in residential use.

St Martin's Church is the Church of England parish church serving this part of Brighton. It stands on the west side of Lewes Road near the Elm Grove junction. It succeeded a smaller building and was built between 1872 and 1875 to the design of George Somers Clarke. The church was built on the initiative of Arthur Wagner to commemorate his father, the Vicar of Brighton Henry Michell Wagner, who had died in 1870.

The present Lewes Road United Reformed Church was registered in September 1996, replacing an older chapel further south on the road. This was built as a Congregational church in 1878 in the Italian Gothic style to the design of architect A. Harford. The façades of the old chapel and its adjacent Sunday school have been retained, and YMCA-supported flats have been built behind.

The Brighton meetinghouse of The Church of Jesus Christ of Latter-day Saints is on the north side of the Vogue Gyratory. It was registered for worship in August 1993.

The former Connaught Institute, which had entrances on Lewes Road and an adjacent side-street, was built in 1879 as an institute for soldiers and manual workers, where religious services were held (it was registered for non-denominational worship in 1890) and educational facilities, medical care and other activities were provided. It was also used as an Anglican mission hall and an Evangelical church, but it went out of use in 2003 and was demolished in the following decade.

== Transport ==
In 2016 it was reported that Lewes Road carried 25,000 vehicles daily. It is a dual carriageway from the Vogue Gyratory to the city boundary and then as far as the edge of Lewes. The first dualling work took place between 1963 and 1964. The section between The Avenue (Moulsecoomb) and Stanmer Park was not done at that time, but this gap was filled in 1967–68. The section beyond the borough boundary as far as Lewes was converted into a dual carriageway in 1981.

Between October 2009 and January 2011 major changes, including the construction of a flyover, were made to the road layout at the junction of Lewes Road and the A27 Brighton Bypass to provide better access to the new Falmer Stadium, The Keep and the University of Sussex campus. The work was part of a larger scheme to turn the full length of Lewes Road into an "academic corridor", linking the Falmer, Moulsecoomb and Brighton (Grand Parade) campuses of the two universities. In 2012 the speed limit on the northern part of Lewes Road was reduced from 40 miles per hour (64 km/h) to 30 miles per hour (48 km/h). The number of accidents fell substantially after this change. In 2013, Brighton and Hove City Council spent £1.4 million on converting one lane of Lewes Road in each direction into a shared bus and cycle lane with traffic light priority for cyclists and 14 "floating" bus stops (where the cycle lane diverges and passes behind the bus stop, allowing buses and bicycles to avoid each other). These were the first such bus stops in the United Kingdom.

In July 2023 it was announced that the southern section of Lewes Road, between Elm Grove and the Vogue Gyratory, would be turned into a red route in spring 2024. Double red lines would be painted along both sides of the carriageway, preventing parking other than in officially designated parking bays.

=== Vogue Gyratory ===
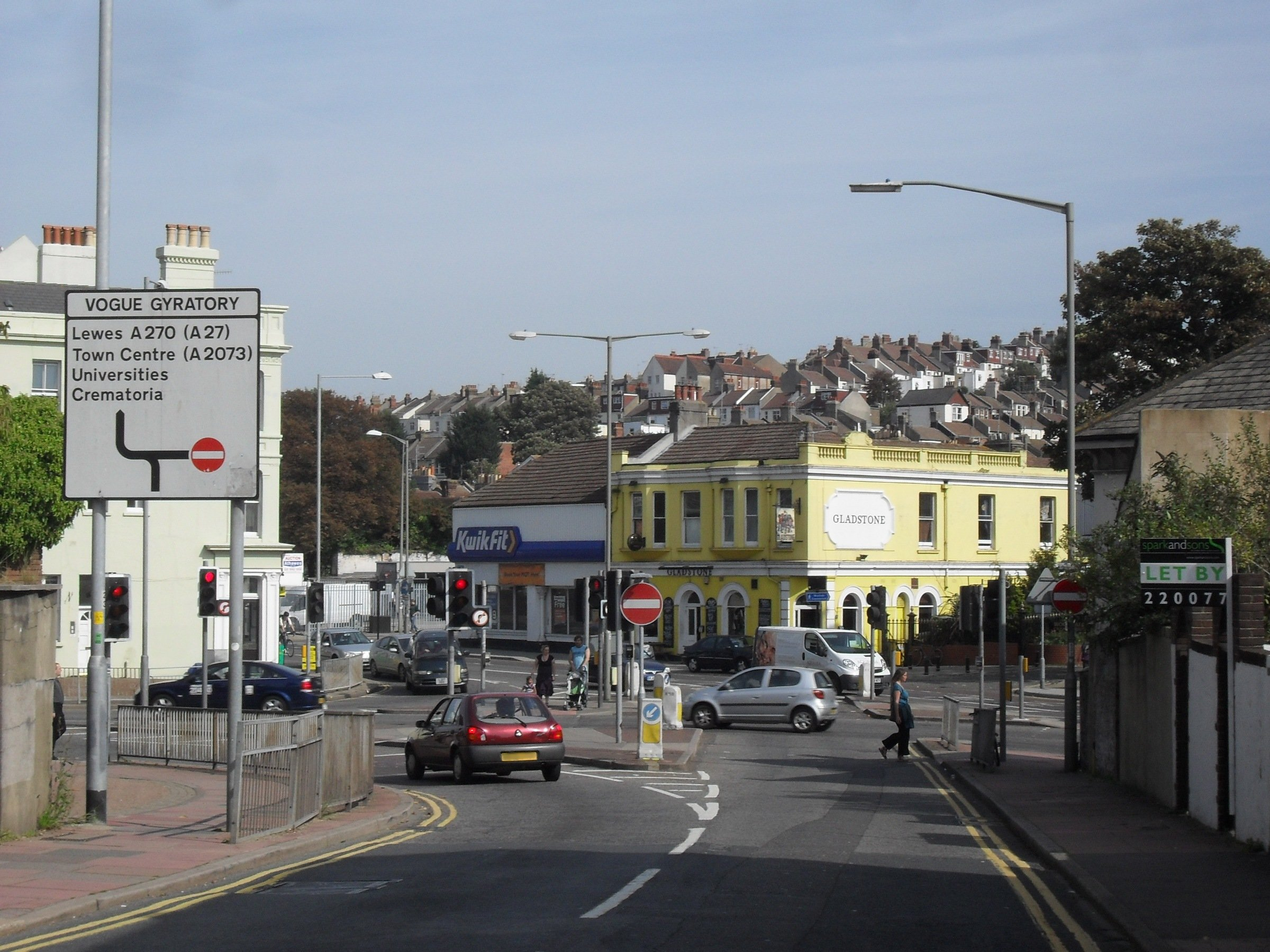
The Vogue Gyratory was completed in 1984.

The Vogue Gyratory was named after the Vogue Cinema, which in its last years was a venue for pornographic films. The new road system was completed in mid-1984. It is the meeting point of Lewes Road, Upper Lewes Road, Hollingdean Road and Bear Road. A "fiendish maze of one-way systems, roundabouts and crossings", it has been described as "an issue that was identified by almost everybody in [council] consultation events" and "a fairly brutal place ... [especially] if you're a pedestrian". Radical redevelopment plans were prompted by the discovery in 2005 that the gyratory was one of the most polluted sites in the city: it was even suggested that the whole area could be demolished (including the Sainsbury's supermarket) and laid out again from scratch. More modest changes were made instead from 2007, including additional bus and cycle lanes.

=== Tramways ===
An open site on the east side of Lewes Road north of Bear Road, occupied at the time by a travellers' camp, was chosen as the site of the Brighton Corporation Tramways depot, offices and workshops. Construction started in May 1901 and the first tram ran on 25 November 1901 on the "Lewes Road route" (Route L) to Victoria Gardens (Old Steine). Routes E and Q to Elm Grove and Queen's Park Road respectively were established later and used the Lewes Road tracks as far as the Elm Grove junction. Short-lived Route M ran from the depot to Seven Dials, avoiding central Brighton, in summer 1922. Plans were also made to extend the tram tracks north from the depot along Lewes Road towards the developing Moulsecoomb estate, and the council and central government (who were required to pass a light railway order) authorised an extension in 1920; but Brighton Corporation Tramways never took up the option and the permission lapsed.

=== Trolleybuses ===
The tram route along Lewes Road was the first to be replaced by trolleybuses, with effect from 1 May 1939. The network reached its greatest extent in 1951, but as the operation of trolleybuses became increasingly expensive following the nationalisation in 1948 of Brighton Corporation's electricity supply and the consequent loss of a cheap electricity source, the system was cut back and eventually withdrawn entirely in 1961. The Lewes Road trolleybus routes were replaced by conventional motor buses from 25 March 1959 and the wires were taken down.

=== Buses ===
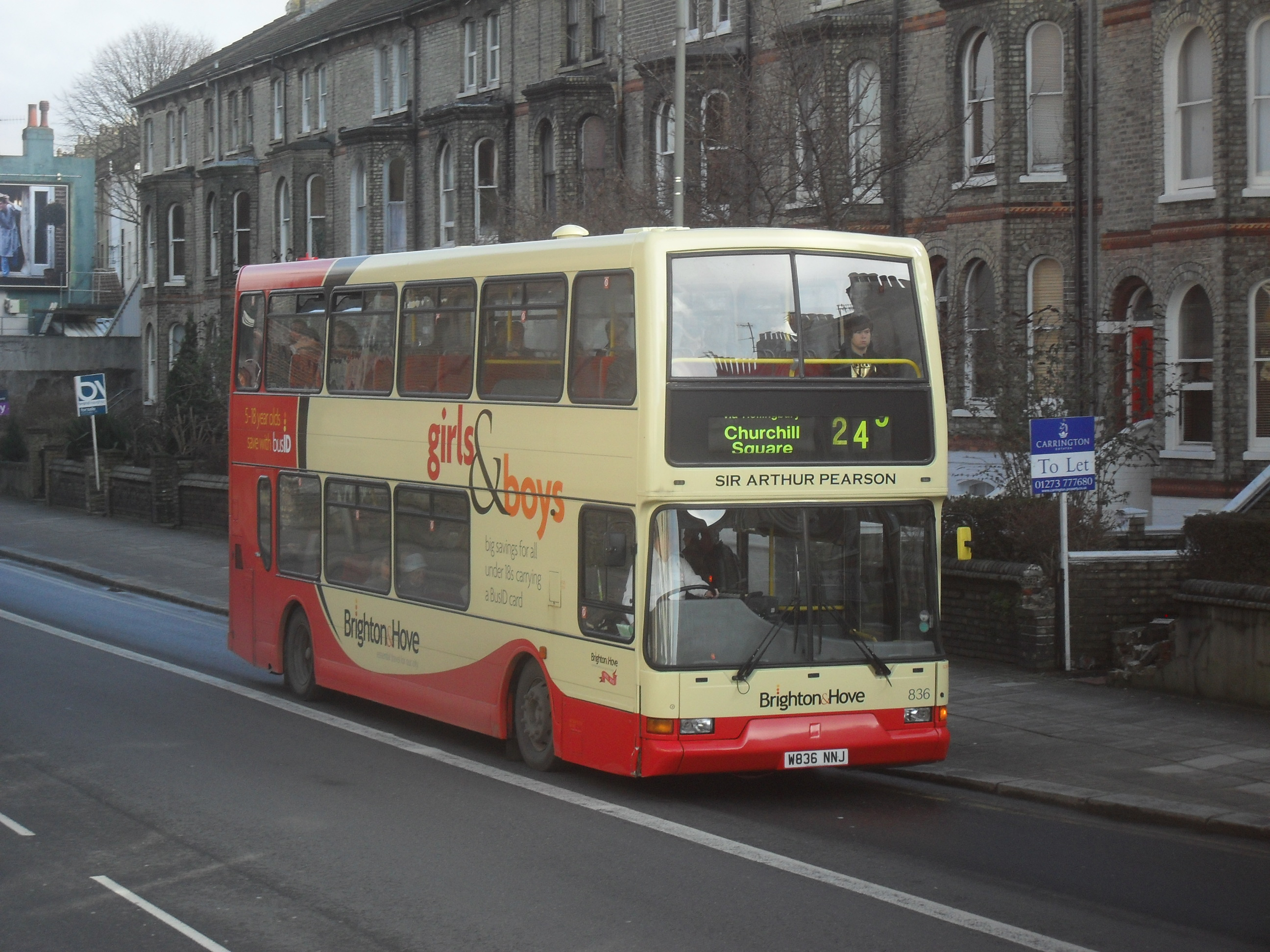
A Brighton & Hove bus on route 24 (Hollingbury–Coldean–Brighton city centre) at Gladstone Terrace in 2010

Lewes Road is an important corridor for bus routes, and buses are well-used. The growth in passenger numbers on routes along Lewes Road serving the universities was greater than on any other part of the Brighton & Hove bus network between 1986 and 2010. The service of three buses per hour between central Brighton and the University of Sussex in 1986 was first augmented by a limited-stop service from September 1991; the frequency was then doubled in May 1996 and rose again in 2001 (eight buses per hour) and 2002 (12 per hour). Services from the universities via Lewes Road to the Royal Sussex County Hospital and Brighton Marina started in 2002. In 1996 a service of three buses per hour was introduced between central Brighton and the Coldean and Hollingbury estates, running the full length of Lewes Road and replacing an older route whose frequency had fluctuated. Routes to the Bear Road, Coombe Road and Meadowview areas of Brighton use the southern part of Lewes Road and have run at various frequencies over the years. Originally operated by Brighton & Hove, these are now run by Compass Travel. The Moulsecoomb and Bevendean estates are served by regular buses which travel to the city centre direct down Lewes Road. Brighton & Hove's longest route, the long-standing "Regency Route" to Royal Tunbridge Wells via Lewes and Uckfield, and its shorter variant to Ringmer, also provides regular services along the length of Lewes Road. By 2009 the various routes combined to give a bus approximately every three minutes to the city centre. The Corporation Tramways depot, on the section of Lewes Road also known as Coombe Terrace, is now part of the Lewes Road bus depot, one of three bus garages in the city. Until the bus industry was deregulated in 1986, Brighton Borough Transport, the council-owned bus operator responsible for many services in Brighton, was based at the depot.

=== Railways ===
The Kemp Town Railway, a branch line from Brighton to Kemp Town, crossed Lewes Road on a 50-foot (15 m) viaduct at a point just south of the historic boundary between Brighton and Preston parishes. A station called Lewes Road was in use between 1 September 1873 and 31 December 1932, when the line closed to passenger services; despite its name it was on D'Aubigny Road in the Round Hill area and could only be accessed from Lewes Road by means of a long footpath. Lewes Road Viaduct, which was 180 yards (160 m) long, was partly demolished in 1976, five years after the line closed to all traffic. The last section was removed seven years later. The site, and the land previously occupied by Cox's Pill Factory and the Vogue Cinema, was cleared to make way for the Vogue Gyratory and the adjacent Sainsbury's supermarket.

== Open space ==
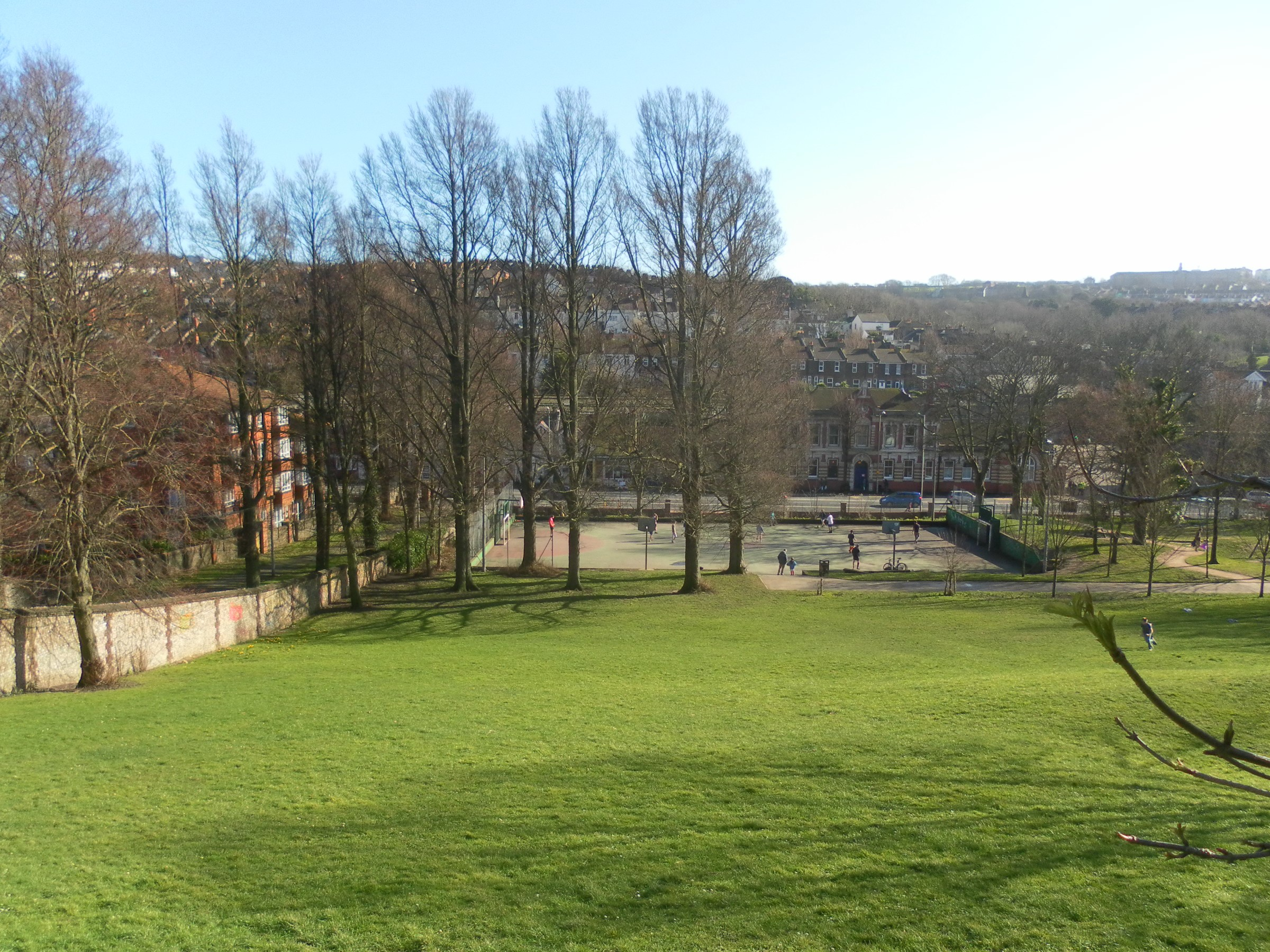
Saunders Park seen in 2014, with Lewes Road in the background

Saunders Park occupies a 4.2-acre (1.7 ha) site on the west side of Lewes Road between the Latter-day Saints meetinghouse and the site of Preston Barracks. It opened on 17 September 1924 on the site of the 19th-century waterworks and pumping station. Although it is "the only green space along the route" until Wild Park at Moulsecoomb is reached, its location on the busy road remote from housing means it is underused.

Much of the land on the east side of Lewes Road opposite the Vogue Gyratory has been given over to cemeteries since the mid-19th century. The Brighton Extra Mural Company was formed in 1850 to buy land to form a private cemetery; over time it expanded, and a public cemetery (now called Woodvale Cemetery) was laid out alongside it in 1857. Nearby, the Brighton Borough Cemetery was established in 1868 and the Brighton and Preston Cemetery 18 years later. The Extra Mural and Woodvale cemeteries occupy a sheltered, well-wooded hillside above Lewes Road and have been described as among "the most delightful spots in the whole of Brighton"; they are open to the public, and have been considered "one of the most pleasant and quiet places in Brighton in which to take a walk" since the Victorian era, when a guidebook was published with suggested walks around the Extra Mural Cemetery.

Close to the cemeteries on the east side of the road is William Clarke Park, also known as The Patch. The park covers just under 2 acres (0.81 ha) of land which was a railway cutting of the Kemp Town branch line until it was demolished. The park has a sports area, a children's playground and a pond among other things. It is also the venue of Patchfest, an annual community festival which has live music.

Further north, at Moulsecoomb, Wild Park was bought by Brighton Corporation in 1925 to preserve it from development and has been left as open downland, apart from the construction of some sports pitches. Wild Park and Hollingbury Hill together make up the city's largest Local nature reserve (LNR), covering 593 acres (240 ha) west of the Lewes Road. The Wild Park area itself covers about 90 acres (36 ha), with a further 200 acres (81 ha) adjacent to it used as farmland.

== Bibliography ==
- Antram, Nicholas; Morrice, Richard (2008). Brighton and Hove. Pevsner Architectural Guides. London: Yale University Press. ISBN 978-0-300-12661-7.
- Antram, Nicholas; Pevsner, Nikolaus (2013). Sussex: East with Brighton and Hove. The Buildings of England. London: Yale University Press. ISBN 978-0-300-18473-0.
- Beevers, David; Roles, John (1993). A Pictorial History of Brighton. Derby: The Breedon Books Publishing Co. Ltd. ISBN 1-873626-54-1.
- Brighton and Hove City Council (June 2015). Planning Advice Note PAN 07: Local List of Heritage Assets (PDF) (Report). Hove: Brighton and Hove City Council (Heritage Team). Archived (PDF) from the original on 4 April 2016.
- Brighton Borough Council (1985). Borough of Brighton Residents' Handbook (2nd ed.). Wallington: Home Publishing Co. Ltd.
- Brighton Polytechnic. School of Architecture and Interior Design (1987). A Guide to the Buildings of Brighton. Macclesfield: McMillan Martin. ISBN 1-869-86503-0.
- Carder, Timothy (1990). The Encyclopaedia of Brighton. Lewes: East Sussex County Libraries. ISBN 0-861-47315-9.
- Collis, Rose (2005). Brighton Boozers: a History of the City's Pub Culture. Brighton: Brighton & Hove City Council (Royal Pavilion, Libraries and Museums Department). ISBN 0-948-72360-2.
- Collis, Rose (2010). The New Encyclopaedia of Brighton. (based on the original by Tim Carder) (1st ed.). Brighton: Brighton & Hove Libraries. ISBN 978-0-9564664-0-2.
- Dale, Antony (1986) [1951]. About Brighton: A Guide to the Buildings and Byways of Brighton and Hove (2nd Revised ed.). Brighton: The Regency Society of Brighton and Hove.
- Dale, Antony (1991). Brighton Cemeteries. Brighton: Brighton Borough Council.
- Dunn, Ruby (1990). Moulsecoomb Days. Brighton: QueensPark Books.
- Elleray, D. Robert (2004). Sussex Places of Worship. Worthing: Optimus Books. ISBN 0-95-331-3271.
- Eyles, Allen (2003). Brighton and Hove Cinemas. Images of England. Stroud: Tempus Publishing. ISBN 0-7524-3069-6.
- Fines, Ken (2002). A History of Brighton & Hove. Chichester: Phillimore & Co. ISBN 978-1-86077-231-3.
- French, Roger (2010). Pride and Joy: My Amazing 25-year Journey with Brighton & Hove Buses. London: Best Impressions. ISBN 978-0-9565740-0-8.
- Harding, Peter A. (1999). The Kemp Town Branch Line. Knaphill: Peter A. Harding. ISBN 978-0-9523458-4-8.
- Toy, David (2016). Brighton's Buses and Trams. Crowthorne: Capital Transport Publishing Ltd. ISBN 978-1-85414-390-7.
- Various authors (2004). Rose Hill to Roundhill: a Brighton Community. Brighton: Brighton Books Publishing. ISBN 978-1-901454-08-6.
