= Julian Crampton =

British biologist and academic (1952–2019)

Julian Crampton CBE
- Born: Julian Moray Crampton; 1 November 1952
- Died: 26 June 2019 (aged 66)
- Education: University of Sussex; Warwick University
- Occupations: Biologist and academic

Julian Moray Crampton CBE (1 November 1952 – 26 June 2019) was a British biologist and academic. From 2005 to 2015, he was Vice-Chancellor of the University of Brighton. In the 2015 Birthday Honours, Crampton was appointed CBE, for services to Higher Education.

== Early life and education ==
Crampton was born on 1 November 1952. He graduated from the University of Sussex with a Bachelor of Science (BSc) degree. He undertook postgraduate research at Warwick University, and completed his Doctor of Philosophy (PhD) degree in 1978 with a doctoral thesis titled "The control of RNA synthesis in vitro".

== Academic career ==
Crampton was a lecturer in molecular biology and tropical diseases at the University of Liverpool. He founded the Wolfson Unit of Molecular Genetics at the Liverpool School of Tropical Medicine in 1983. He was appointed to a personal chair in 1991 as Professor of Molecular Biology. He was made head of the newly created School of Biological Sciences in 1996, and pro-vice-chancellor for regional affairs in 2000.

His research interests included the treatment of malaria, and the bites of venomous snakes and spider. He is known for developing a variety of mosquito both incapable of spreading malaria and capable of vaccinating people against malaria, known as flying syringes.

In January 2016, Crampton was appointed Chair of Council for the University of Gloucestershire.

Academic offices
Preceded by David Watson	Vice-Chancellor of the University of Brighton; 2005 to 2015	Succeeded by Debra Humphris
