= Preston Barracks =

Demolished military installation

- Brighton
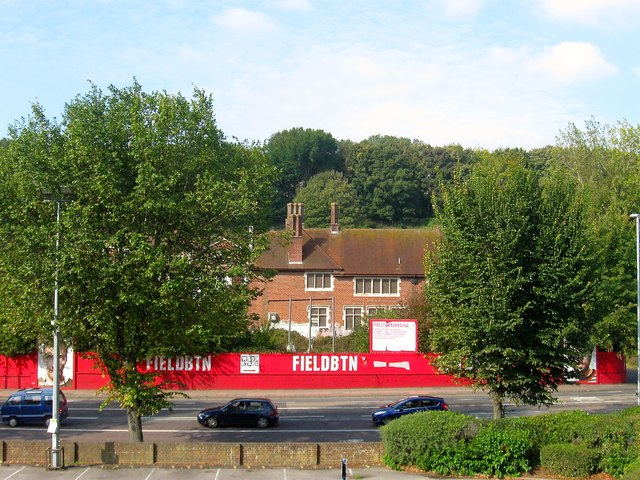
- Former Officers' Mess, Preston Barracks, Lewes Road, Brighton

Site information
- Type: Barracks
- Owner: Brighton and Hove City Council

Location
- Location within East Sussex
- Coordinates: 50.84220°N 0.12134°W

Site history
- Built: 1793
- Built for: War Office
- In use: 1793–2000
- Fate: Demolished

Preston Barracks was a military installation on Lewes Road, Brighton. All of the buildings on the site (except for the Crimean War Building) have been demolished, most recently in 2018, with mainly student residences and a retail park built on the site.

== History ==
The barracks were built in the regency style as part of the British response to the threat of the French Revolution and were completed in 1793. The barracks were designed to accommodate artillery and cavalry units and included stables for up to 1,000 horses. The structures included a building originally built as a canteen but which was converted into a military hospital in 1820: it went on to be used as a location for various military meetings, including courts-martial, chaired by Lieutenant-Colonel the Earl of Cardigan, who commanded the 11th Light Dragoons at the barracks in the 1840s and who then commanded the light brigade at the Battle of Balaklava during the Crimean War. This structure later became known as the Crimean War Building.

Married quarters were added in the 1850s and a new officers' mess was built in around 1900. The original regency barracks, at the southern end of the site, were largely demolished in 1990 and that part of the site is now occupied by the Pavilion Retail Park.

The northern end of the site was used as a Territorial Army Centre until around 2000; it is now however largely redeveloped. However, the Crimean War Building survives and remains in Ministry of Defence ownership for use as an Army Cadet Force Centre. The officers' mess is also still standing but is empty.

The northern end of the site was acquired by Brighton and Hove City Council in 2002. In 2009 a 'Shared Vision' was agreed with the University of Brighton to explore wider development opportunities.

A Site Capacity Assessment examined the development potential and was completed in 2010. A planning brief was approved in September 2011, and in 2012 a masterplan was commissioned by the partners. This was presented in July 2013, and later in 2013 the Policy & Resources Committee agreed the detailed arrangements and the partners concluded negotiations.

In July 2014 the University and Council exchanged contracts with the developers U+I Plc and Development Securities PLC. Plans were created in a process that included a number of public consultations. This concluded in February 2017 with the submission of a full planning application. Planning consent was granted in September 2017.

The university's vice chancellor, Debra Humphris, advocated for a £300m transformation of the barracks into student residences and the university's business school.

Redevelopment of the combined site, commenced in 2018.

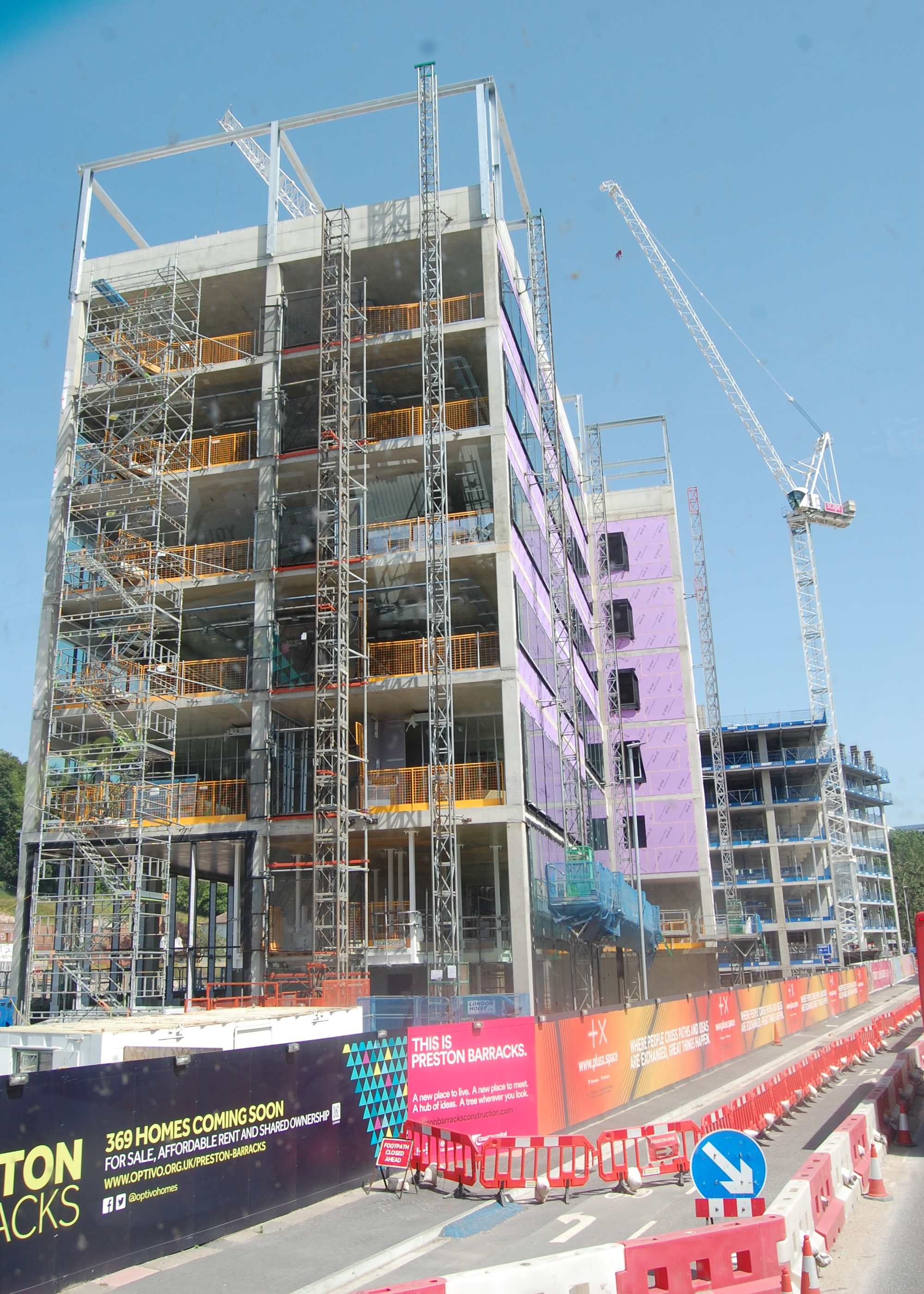
Construction Works at the Preston Barracks site in 2019

The Preston Barracks regeneration project, nicknamed 'The Big Build', created 369 homes, 1,338 student bedrooms, a medical centre and pharmacy (under construction), an academic building for the University of Brighton, shops, cafes, sport and recreation facilities, car parking and a pedestrian bridge which crossed the Lewes Road (the A270).
