= Somers Clarke =

English architect and Egyptologist (1841–1926)

George Clarke
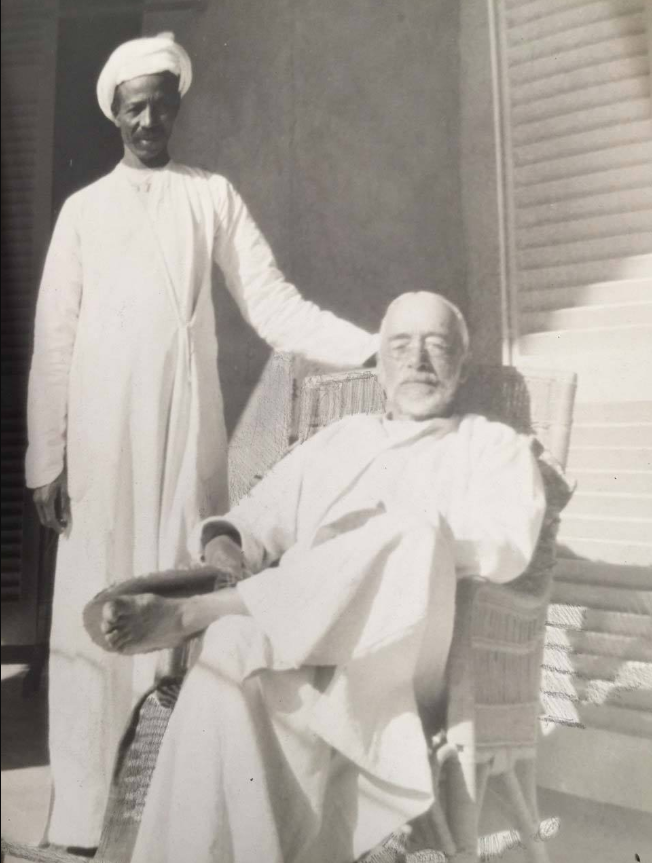
- Born: 22 July 1841; Brighton, England
- Died: 31 August 1926 (aged 85); Egypt
- Occupation: Architect

George Somers Clarke (22 July 1841 – 31 August 1926) was an architect and English Egyptologist who worked on the restoration and design of churches and at a number of sites throughout Egypt, notably in El Kab, where he built a mud brick house. He was the son of solicitor Somers C. and Sarah Blaker in Brighton, where he was born and privately educated. Clarke began as an apprentice to the law for five years before beginning work with Sir G. Gilbert Scott. He was one of the pupils of Sir Charles Barry, who was also a British architect.

As an architect he mainly worked on restoring churches. He entered the offices of Sir Gilbert Scott and later worked in partnership with John Micklethwaite from offices at 15 Dean's Yard, Westminster, London. In this partnership they accomplished numerous church restorations and repairs, for St. Martin's in Brighton, St. John the Divine Church in Gainsborough, Lincolnshire, and many others.He joined the Society of Antiquaries of London 1881. Later became a fellow member of the Royal Society of Arts in 1892. In Hierakonpolis, with Green and Quibel, he helped with excavations along with exploring El Kab in 1893 with J.J. Tylor. He was Surveyor of the Fabric of St Paul's Cathedral from 1897 to 1906. He was the architect in charge of St. Paul's Cathedral, and during his time working on the conservation of the cathedral, he would write to The New York Times about the poor conditions the cathedral was in. As Surveyor of St Paul's Cathedral, he designed the new lighting, funded by a gift from Mr. J. Pierpont Morgan, and the stalls for the chapel of the Order of St. Micheal and St. George. Working alongside Sir W. B. Richmond, he organized internal decorations for the chapel and relocated, from a small side-chapel, Alfred Stevens' Monument to the Duke of Wellington. After he was done with his work at St. Paul's Cathedral, he was succeeded by Mervyn Macartney as the Surveyor of St. Paul's Cathedral in 1907. Clarke also worked with the Dean and Chapter of Chichester Cathedral as a selected architect in 1900.

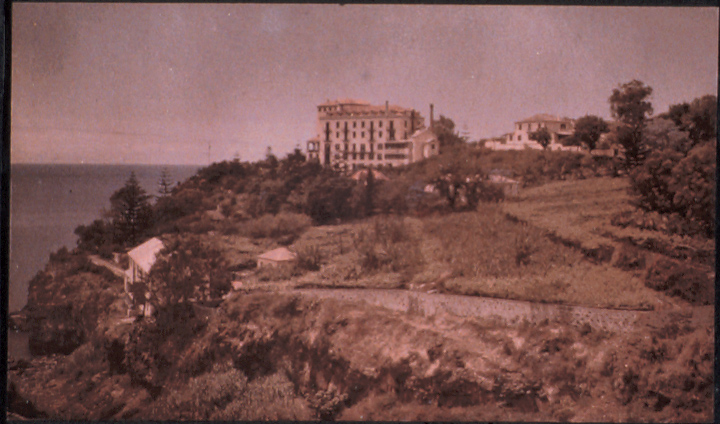
View of Reid's Hotel in Funchal, Madeira, photographed by Sarah Angelina Acland (c. 1910)

After he retired in 1922, Clarke continued to live in Egypt. His interpreter, Daud Hasan of Argin, and Nubian servant lived with him in his retirement home. While in Egypt, he became an honorary member of Comite de Conservation des Monuments de l' Art Arabe and assisted in repairing several ancient temples. He occasionally participated in architectural discussions at meetings for the Council of the Society of Antiquaries as a member for 45 years and, since 1892, as a life Fellow of the Royal Society of Arts. He was also an original member of The Royal Musical Association. He died in Mahamid in August 1926.

== Early Commissions ==
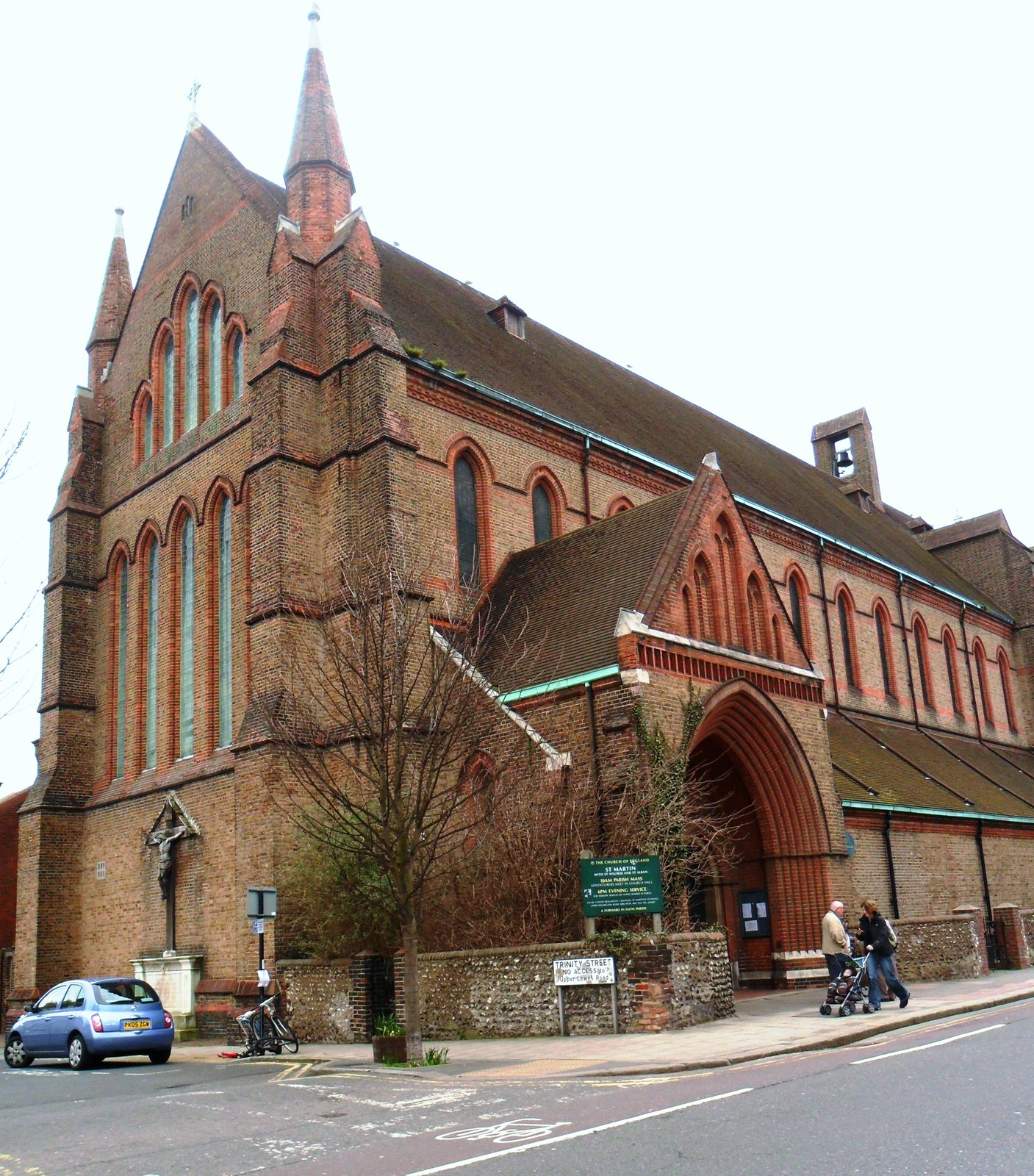
St. Martin's Church, Lewes Road, Brighton, one of Somers early Commissions, built in (c. 1875-1876)

After completing his training with architect Sir George Gilbert Scott, Somers Clarke started his independent practice in the late 1860s, initially focusing on projects in Brighton and the surrounding areas. His early independent work focused on church design and restoration, heavily influenced by the Gothic Revival Style he learned from Sir George Gilbert Scott. His first major independent project was St. Martin's Church on Lewes Road in Brighton, built between 1874 and 1875 as a memorial to the Reverend H.M. Wagner.While the building featured a restrained brick exterior, Somers Clarke spent the next three decades designing its elaborate interior fittings, including the ornate font canopy.

In 1876, He entered a professional partnership with John Thomas Micklethwaite, a fellow former pupil of Sir George Gilbert Scott. One of their collaborations was the St. Martin's Church, Brighton, where it was the first model of one of the sides of the Church which was shown in the 1st exhibition of the Arts & Crafts Exhibition Society at the New Gallery in London in 1888. Both architects parted ways in 1892 but continued to work on later projects together like the St. Mary, Stretton, Staffordshire from 1895-1897.

== Donations of his work ==
In his will he left the British Museum's Department of Egyptian and Assyrian Antiquities some of his maps, books, and pamphlets. The Egyptian department of the British Museum were also gifted some of his work regarding the churches of Egypt in the form of drawings, papers, and maps. The Egyptian Exploration Fund were also gifted some his articles about Coptic lamps and clothing. He received small collections of broken pottery from the excavations of the Fostat area in Egypt and then sent them to South Kensington, UK, and other rural museums. Today, many of his architecture drawings of some of his projects can be found at the Victoria and Albert Museum in London, UK.

== Works, books and writings ==
Works
Year	Work	Description
1861	Merchant Seamen's Orphan Asylum	Designed by him, and it was previously a hospital chapel.
1866	Sackville School	Designed by him, and was previously a country house.
1866	7 Lothbury Bank	Designed by him in a Venetian Gothic Style for General credit.
1872–78	Wyfold Court, Rotherfield Peppard, Oxfordshire	
1874-75	St Martin's parish church, Lewes Road, Brighton (Wagner Memorial Church)	The largest church in Brighton, complete except proposed saddle-back tower. Spectacular pulpit based on the Sacrament House in St. Lorenz, Nuremberg.
1875	St Peter's Church, Brighton	Scheme for remodeling and extending (only partly achieved).
1879	St Nicholas parish church in Kiddington, Oxfordshire	Vestry and organ loft; also designed several features in the church such as wood panels with tracery, choir stall detailing heads of poppy flowers, and paintings on the east and west walls. In his memory, the second beam in the east area is inscribed with his name.
1885	Parish church of St John The Divine, Gainsborough, Lincolnshire	
1885	Church at Wimbledon	(proposed)
1889	St Mary's Church, Potton, Bedfordshire	
1890	St Peter's parish church, Marsh Baldon, Oxfordshire	Restoration with Micklethwaite.
1891	Reid's Palace Hotel, Funchal, Madeira	
1891-1893	Church of All Saints, Merton district	Worked on it with John Thomas Micklethwaite.
1893-1896	Temple of Queen Hatshepsut, Deir el-Bahri	Assisted Edouard Naville with excavating, conserving, and recording.
1892	St Saviour's parish church, Folkestone, Kent	
1892	St Nicholas' Church, Brighton	Designs for wall paintings by C.E. Kempe.
1893	The Frank James Memorial Hospital, East Cowes, Isle of Wight	
1897-1898	Excavation of Hierakonpolis	Assisted James Edward Quibell; the University of Oxford houses their work documents. His contributions included making a plan and section of the temple.
1898	Temple of Amenhotep III	Plans and elevations.
1900	Tomb of Renni	Plans and elevations.
1900-1906	St Peter's parish church, Brighton	New chancel with eleven-light east window (with Micklewaite).
1907	The XIth Dynasty Temple at Deir el-Bahari	By Edouard Naville, Harry Reginald Holland, Edward Russell Ayrton, Charles Trick Currelly, and Somers Clarke: contributed architectural descriptions
1910	Chichester Cathedral	Reredos
	SS Philip & James parish church, Oxford	Reredos
1965	Mountains, Hildenborough, Kent	

Books/Writings
Year	Title	Description
1882	On the Structure and History of English Churches	co-authored with J. T. Micklethwaite ; Techniques in Historical preservation emphasis
	Oedipus	by Sophocles: added critical and explanatory
1912	Christian Antiquities of the Nile	includes a monograph of the Red Monastery Church (Dayr Anbā Bišūy) and the White Monastery (Dayr Anbā Šinūda)
1916	Ancient Egyptian Frontier Fortresses	
1920	Ancient Egypt	By Flinders Petrie; contributed two pieces: Nile Boats and Other Matters, and Georges Legrain.
1920	The Unrest in Egypt	Wrote his ideas about why the lower-class citizens of Egypt are upset.
1922	The Organs of St. Paul's Cathedral	The Apollonicon, The Positive, and letters to the editor; included in The Organ Quarterly Review.
1930	Ancient Egyptian Construction and Architecture	With Reginold Engelbach
1930	Ancient Egyptian Masonry: The Building of Craft	With Reginold Engelbak.

== Sources ==
- Nairn, Ian; Pevsner, Nikolaus (1965). Sussex. The Buildings of England. Harmondsworth: Penguin Books. pp. 69–71, 155, 427, 438, 433, 436. ISBN 0-14-071028-0.
- Sherwood, Jennifer; Pevsner, Nikolaus (1974). Oxfordshire. The Buildings of England. Harmondsworth: Penguin Books. pp. 403, 669, 698 738. ISBN 0-14-071045-0.
