= John Thomas Micklethwaite =

John Thomas Micklethwaite (3 May 1843 – 28 October 1906) was an English architect and archaeologist. He had a long association with Westminster Abbey, and was noted for his criticisms of the current practices of church restoration.

== Biography ==
He was born at Rishworth House, Bond Street, Wakefield, Yorkshire (which stood on the site of what is now County Hall, Wakefield) to James Micklethwaite of Hopton, Mirfield, a worsted spinner and colliery owner, and his wife, Sarah Eliza Stanway of Manchester. He grew up in the Micklethwaite family’s ancestral home at Hopton Hall and was educated in Tadcaster and Wakefield. After moving to London where he attended King’s College, he was apprenticed, in 1862, to George Gilbert Scott, commencing independent practice in London in 1869.

By 1876 Micklethwaite had entered partnership with Somers Clarke, his lifelong friend and fellow pupil of Scott. His work as an architect consisted mainly of small-scale ecclesiastical commissions. He also designed furnishings for many churches, and throughout his career devoted himself to archaeological studies and wrote widely about church archaeology, architecture, sculpture and ornament.

He was greatly concerned with issues of preservation and restoration of ancient buildings, especially churches. In 1881 he wrote a paper On The Treatment Of Ancient Architectural Remains in which he argued that the "restoration" practices of the last generation had been "...more destructive than the axe of the Puritan, or the century and a half of churchwardenism which came after it" (p. 353). He dismissed the idea that a church belongs to a particular period, arguing that all churches have long histories, and each generation has left its mark. He was particularly critical of restorations where the new work could not be distinguished from the old, leading to a complete loss of the historical significance of the building. When repairing Winchelsea Church in Sussex, some stonework had to be replaced. The new stones were dated, to avoid confusing future generations.

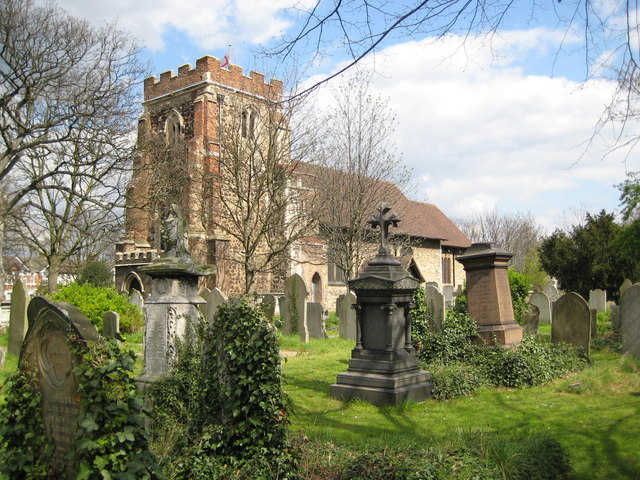
St Mary Magdalene, East Ham

In 1891, Micklethwaite prepared a report on St Mary Magdalene's Church, East Ham. This church, largely of the 12th-Century, was in poor repair and threatened with demolition. The report showed that the church could be repaired, and it was, between 1891-6.

He was one of the founders of the Alcuin Club, the Henry Bradshaw Society, and the St Paul's Ecclesiological Society. He was a member of the Art Workers' Guild to which he was elected Master in 1893, and took a leading part in the affairs of the Archaeological Institute and of the Society of Antiquaries.

Ground Plan and Longitudinal Section of Westminster Abbey, drawn in 1893

Micklethwaite had a long association with Westminster Abbey, and published a number of articles describing various parts of the Abbey complex. Following the first of these, in 1870, he was elected a Fellow of the Society of Antiquaries. From 1898 until his death in 1906, aged 63, Micklethwaite served as Surveyor of the Fabric of the Abbey, where he is buried in the West Cloister. The Dean wrote: "Yesterday (October 31, 1906) we laid in the cloisters an eager, reverent, skilful worker. John Thomas Micklethwaite studied this Abbey during the main part of his life. He gave his whole heart to this place, and jealously guarded every fragment that could tell of its long history".

== Notable works ==
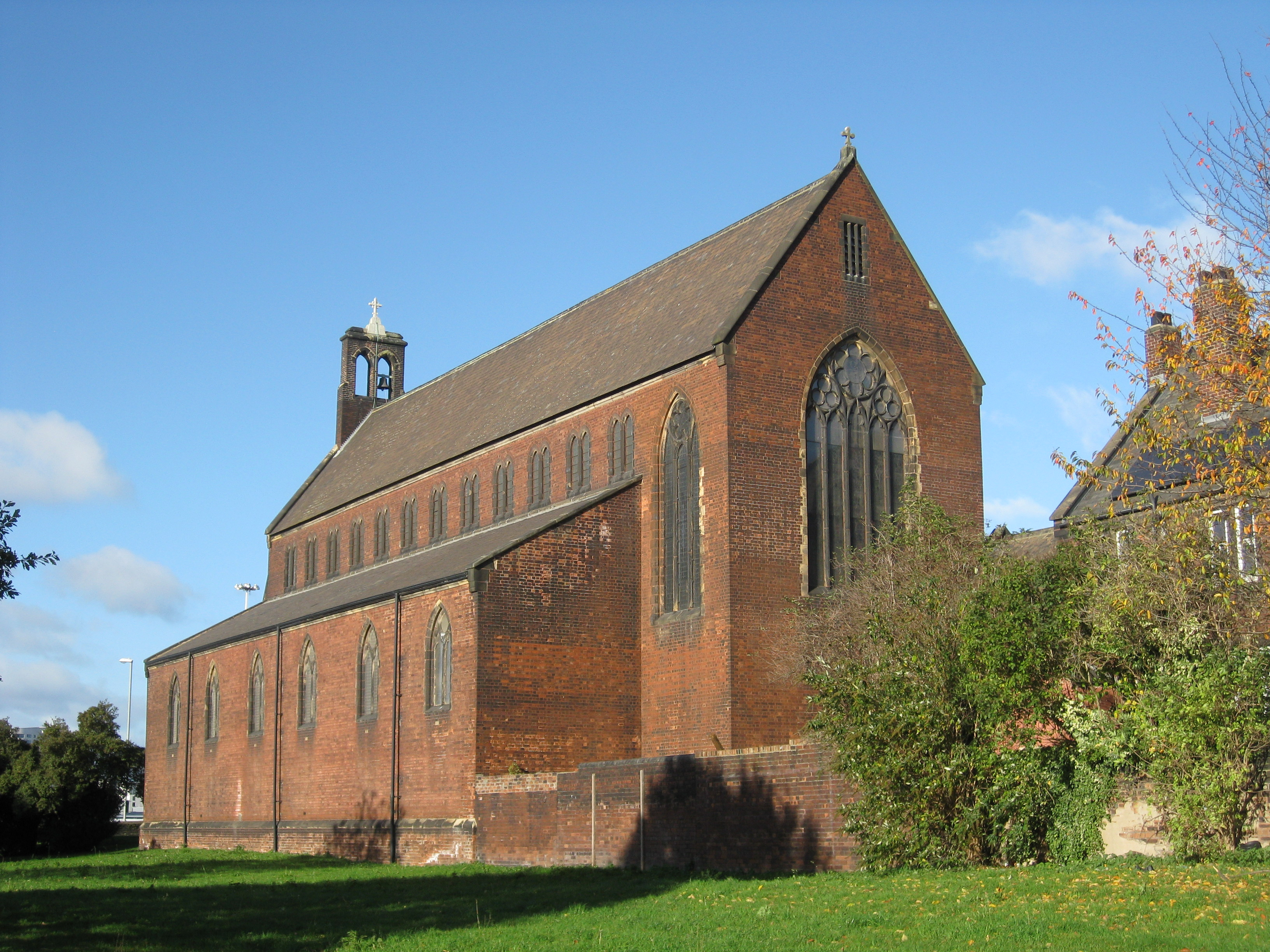
St Hilda's Church, Cross Green, Leeds

- 1876-81 St Hilda, Cross Green, Leeds.
- 1884-1894 St Leonard's Church, Bengeo
- 1891 (with Somers Clarke) Reid's New Hotel, Funchal, Madeira
- 1894-1900 St Bartholomew's Church, Orford - reconstruction.
- 1897-1905 St Saviour Luton
- 1891 St Paul Morton re-building (except tower).
- 1892 Keble College, Oxford Side-chapel to house "The Light of the World" by William Holman Hunt.
- 1897 St Peter Bocking, Essex.
- 1907 St Michael Lydbury North, Shropshire - restoration.

== Selected publications ==
- Micklethwaite, John Thomas (1872). "The Shrine of St. Alban". Archaeological Journal. 29: 201–211. doi:10.1080/00665983.1872.10851555.
- —— (1873). "Description of the Chapel of Saint Erasmus in Westminster Abbey". Archaeologia. 44: 93–99. doi:10.1017/S0261340900006640.
- —— (1874). Modern Parish Churches: Their Plan, Design, and Furniture. London: Henry S. King.
- —— (1876). "Notes on the Abbey buildings of Westminster". Archaeological Journal. 33: 15–48. doi:10.1080/00665983.1876.10851715.
- —— (1878). "Parish churches in the year 1548". Archaeological Journal. 35: 372–396. doi:10.1080/00665983.1878.10851837.
- —— (1889). "Description of the Paintings in the Church of Kempley, near Ross". Archaeologia. 46: 187–194. doi:10.1017/S0261340900006093.
- —— (1881). "On The Treatment Of Ancient Architectural Remains". Archaeological Journal. 38: 352–360. doi:10.1080/00665983.1881.10851993.
- —— (1881). "The Ancient and The Modern way of Building Parish Churches compared". Reports and Papers of the Architectural and Archaeological Societies of the Counties of Lincoln and Northampton. 16: 144–150.
- —— (1882). "On the Crypts at Hexham and Ripon". Archaeological Journal. 39: 347–354. doi:10.1080/00665983.1882.10852041.
- —— (1883). "Opening Address Of The Section Of Architecture at The Lewes Meeting". Archaeological Journal. 40: 368–376. doi:10.1080/00665983.1883.10852095.
- —— (1883). "Notes on the Imagery of Henry the Seventh's Chapel, Westminster". Archaeologia. 47 (2): 361–380. doi:10.1017/S0261340900004963.
- —— (1888). "On Pigeon Houses in Churches". Archaeological Journal. 45: 374–378. doi:10.1080/00665983.1888.10852326.
- —— (1892). "On the indoor games of school boys in the Middle Ages". Archaeological Journal. 49: 319–328. doi:10.1080/00665983.1892.10852528.
- —— (1892). "On a Filtering Cistern of the Fourteenth Century at Westminster Abbey". Archaeologia. 53: 161–170. doi:10.1017/S0261340900011267.
- —— (1894). "Further Notes on the Abbey Buildings at Westminster". Archaeological Journal. 51: 1–27. doi:10.1080/00665983.1894.10852610.
- —— (1896). "Something about Saxon church building". Archaeological Journal. 53: 293–351. doi:10.1080/00665983.1896.10852716.
- —— (1898). "Some Further Notes on Saxon Churches: Being the Address at the Opening of the Architectural Section of the Lancaster Meeting". Archaeological Journal. 55: 340–349. doi:10.1080/00665983.1898.10852777.
- —— (1900). The Cistercian order. Yorkshire Archaeological Society.
- Feasey, H.J.; Micklethwaite, J.T.; Bell, E. (1899). Westminster Abbey Historically Described. G. Bell & sons.
- Poole, R.S.; Richmond, W.B.; Micklethwaite, J.T.; Morris, W. (1882). Lectures on Art. Macmillan and Company.

== Sources ==
This article incorporates text from a publication now in the public domain: Lee, Sidney, ed. (1912). "Micklethwaite, John Thomas". Dictionary of National Biography (2nd supplement). London: Smith, Elder & Co.
