= Elm Grove, Brighton =

Area of Brighton and Hove, England

Coordinates: 50.8322°N 0.1229°W

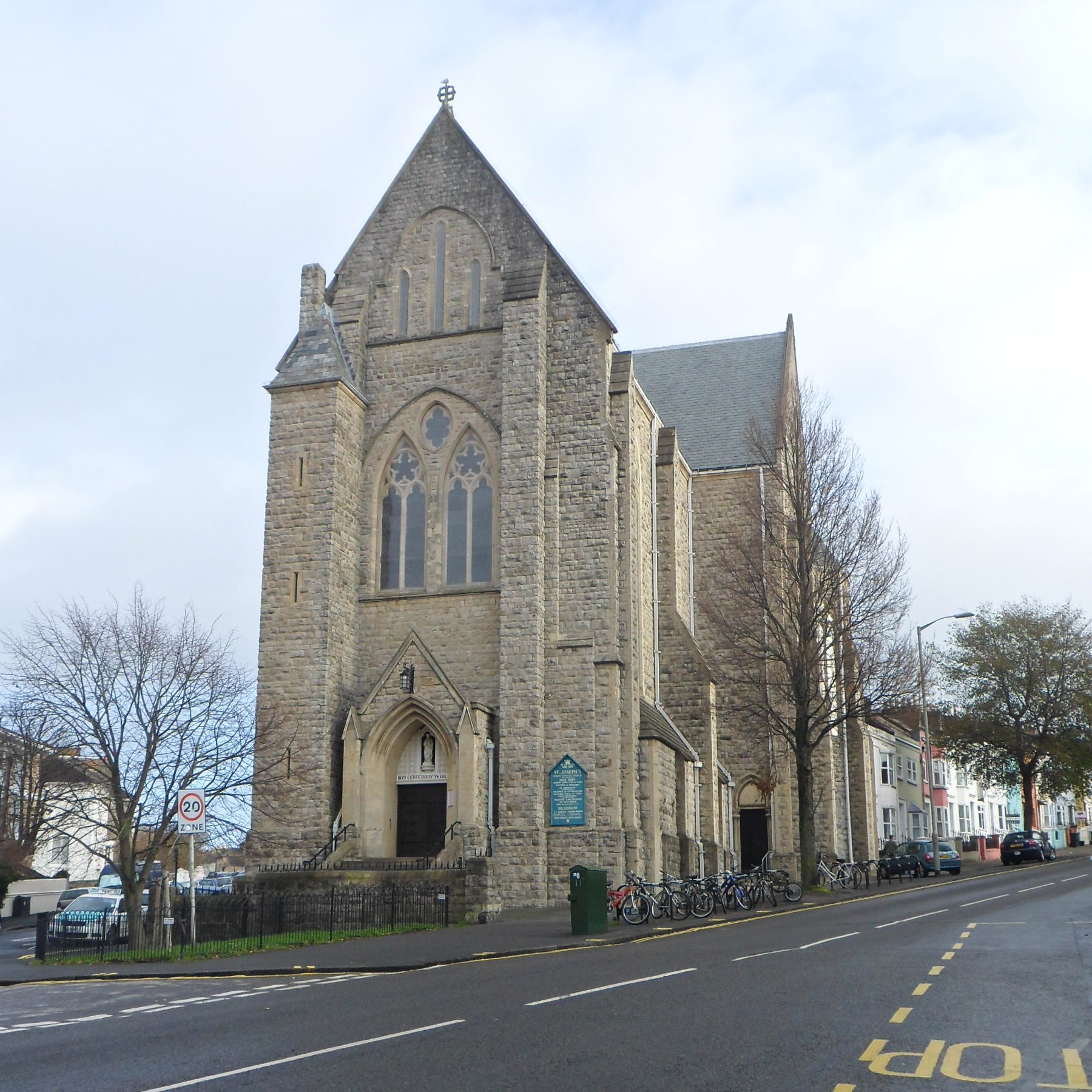
St Joseph's Church stands at the foot of the steeply sloping Elm Grove. Some of the terraced houses and elm trees characteristic of the area are in the background.

Elm Grove is a mainly residential area of Brighton, part of the English coastal city of Brighton and Hove. The densely populated district lies on a steep hill northeast of the city centre and developed in the second half of the 19th century after the laying out of a major west–east road, called Elm Grove. Terraced houses, small shops and public buildings characterise the streetscape: within the area is a major hospital, two churches (all with listed building status) and a former board school, as well as Brighton's oldest council houses and an interwar council estate.

The road has its origins in a cross-country Roman road, and it remained a rural track until the 19th century. Although their numbers have declined, it is known for the mature elm trees lining the road, which links Lewes Road with Brighton Racecourse and the city's eastern suburbs. A tram route which ran along the road and a railway branch line which passed through the area by viaduct and tunnel closed in the 20th century, but it is still served by three bus routes. Although surrounded on several sides by other inner suburbs such as Hanover and Round Hill, Elm Grove is close to large areas of open space such as Race Hill, Tenantry Down and Brighton's extensive Victorian cemeteries.

== Location and topography ==
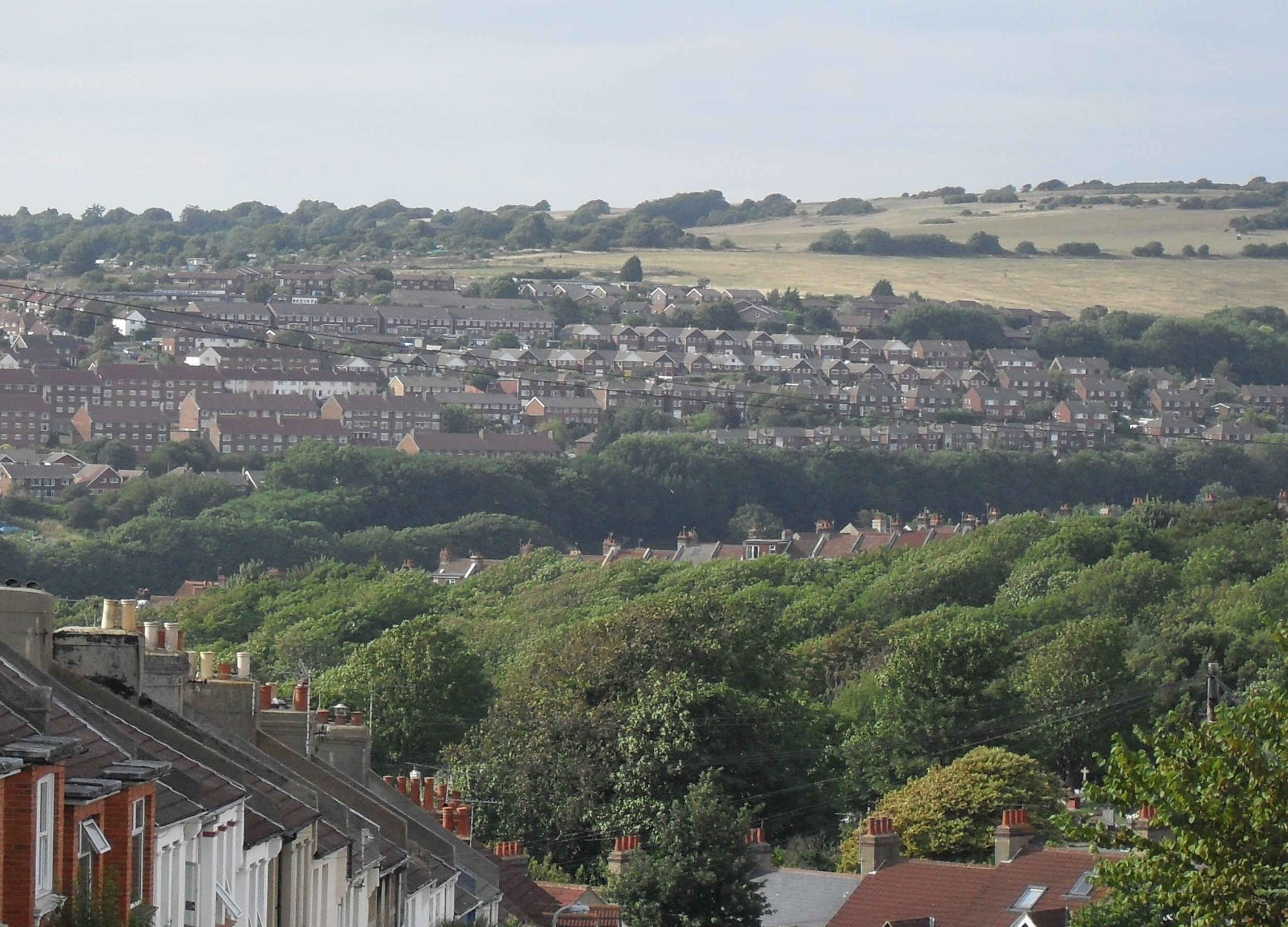
Extensive westward and northward views are possible from the Elm Grove area. From the junction of Elm Grove and Ryde Road, the Hollingdean estate and Hollingbury Hill can be seen. The well-wooded area in the foreground is part of Brighton's chain of Victorian cemeteries.

Brighton and Hove City Council's Urban Characterisation Study of the Hanover and Elm Grove districts describes the Elm Grove area (Note: Under the name "Hartington character area" within the Hanover and Elm Grove neighbourhood.) as a "high density Victorian residential area following the contours of the steep valley side". There is "a strong sense of place" and it is "a very popular [place] to live". Located on a west-facing slope on the steep eastern side of the dry valley through which Lewes Road runs, it is convenient for the city centre, the Lewes Road shopping area and major transport routes. The top of Elm Grove close to the racecourse acts as an "important potential gateway into the city" from the east.

The hillside location gives many parts of the Elm Grove area long views in several directions, especially to the west and north. There is little open space within the area apart from William Clarke Park, although Queen’s Park lies within walking distance to the south and open downland is nearby. There is also limited tree cover, except for Elm Grove itself which is lined with mature elm trees. Elms are ideally suited to Brighton's chalky soil and salt-laden air. Thousands were planted in the 19th and early 20th centuries, and there are still more than 17,000—helped by an ongoing programme of Elm disease control by the council. The Great Storm of 1987 destroyed or damaged many, though, including along Elm Grove.

Elm Grove (the road) forms the northern limit of the Hanover suburb. Although developed at a similar time to the streets to the north, Hanover originally had a solidly working-class character, with many streets of small terraced houses. Although terraced housing is also common north of Elm Grove, there is a much wider range of housing styles and sizes, and the area developed a more mixed character as a result. Brighton's extensive chain of Victorian cemeteries, set into an undulating 100-acre (40 ha) valley formerly used as farmland, lie immediately north of Hartington Road and separate the Elm Grove district from the Bear Road/Coombe Road district, another hillside area of dense terraced housing.

== History ==
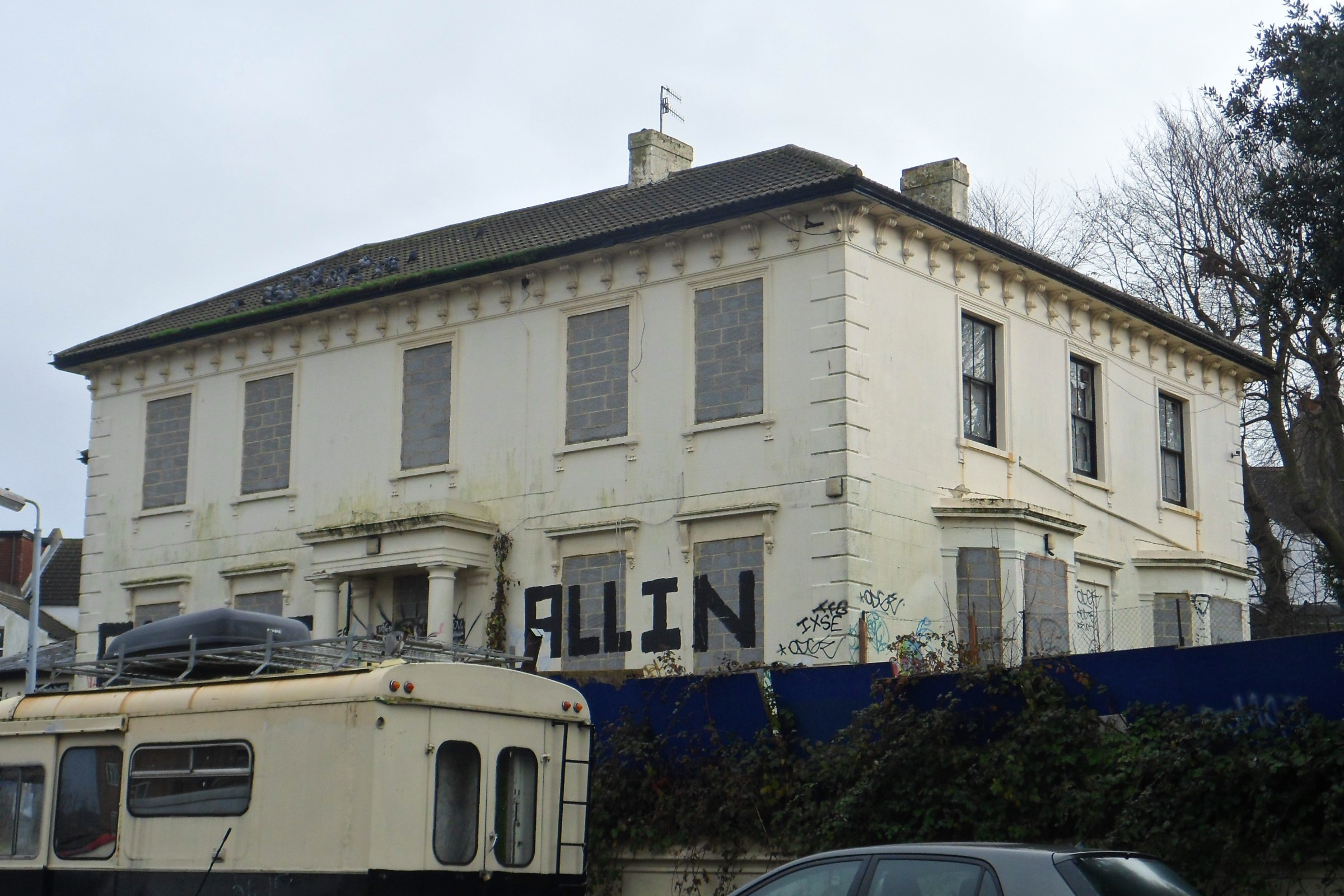
The area's earliest houses were detached villas on Wellington Road. Number 18, derelict in 2014, is the only survivor.

Several Roman roads have been identified running across the area covered by the city of Brighton and Hove. One ran west–east inland from the coast along the line of the present Old Shoreham Road. After crossing the London to Brighton Way possibly where Preston Circus is now, it continued eastwards up the east side of the Wellesbourne valley on to the ridge of the South Downs to Lewes, where it became a ridgeway as it crossed Newmarket Hill and Kingston Hill.

Brighton Racecourse opened on Whitehawk Hill to the northeast of Brighton in 1783, and the ancient track—which climbed a long, steep west-facing slope at this point—was used by people visiting it from central Brighton. As the town grew, it became a more important route, and in 1852 elm trees were planted along each side by Amon Henry Wilds on behalf of the Brighton Town Commissioners, for whom he had previously served as an officer. The name Elm Grove was given at this time. The only building north of the road was Hanover Mill, a post mill erected c. 1838 and demolished in the 1890s when Bernard Road was built on the site. Lewes Road itself was mostly undeveloped as well, apart from six almshouses built on the south side of its junction with Elm Grove. These were the first part of what later became the Percy and Wagner Almshouses after six more were added in 1859.

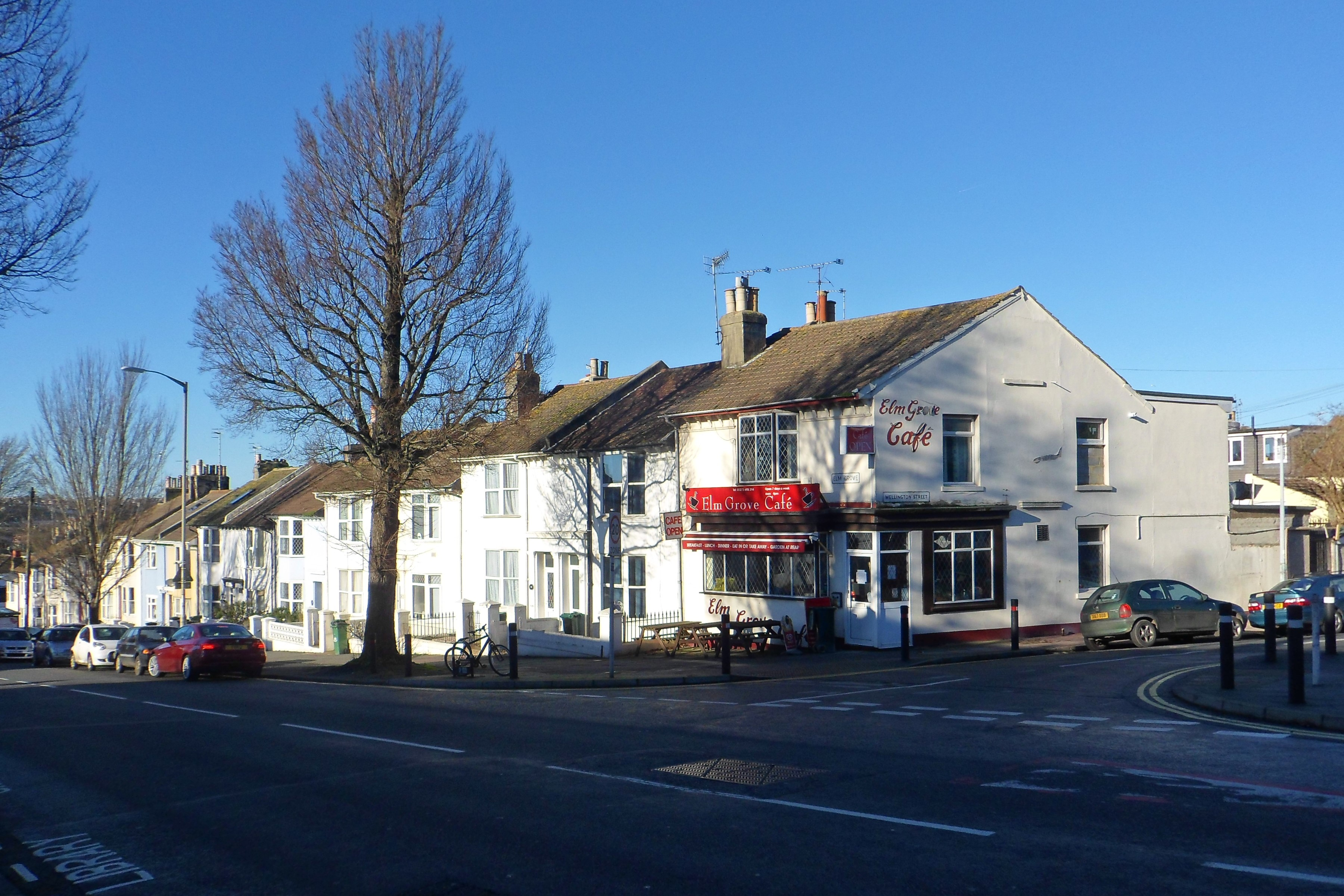
Housing development had reached Wellington Street (right) by 1864.

The first residential development took place between 1854 and 1858 at Melbourne Street and on Wellington Road, which led northeastwards from the bottom of Elm Grove. Of the detached villas in spacious grounds, only one remains, at number 18. This was converted into a children's home and later became a daycare centre operated by The Children's Society, but it became vacant in 2004. It fell into dereliction and was bought by developers Baron Homes in 2006, whose planning application for partial demolition and redevelopment (granted in 2008) lapsed in 2011. In January 2012, local residents raised concerns about the building's fate and the presence of squatters. A new planning application seeking full demolition and replacement with two blocks of flats was refused in August 2013. Elsewhere on Wellington Road, Victorian houses are interspersed with postwar blocks of flats.

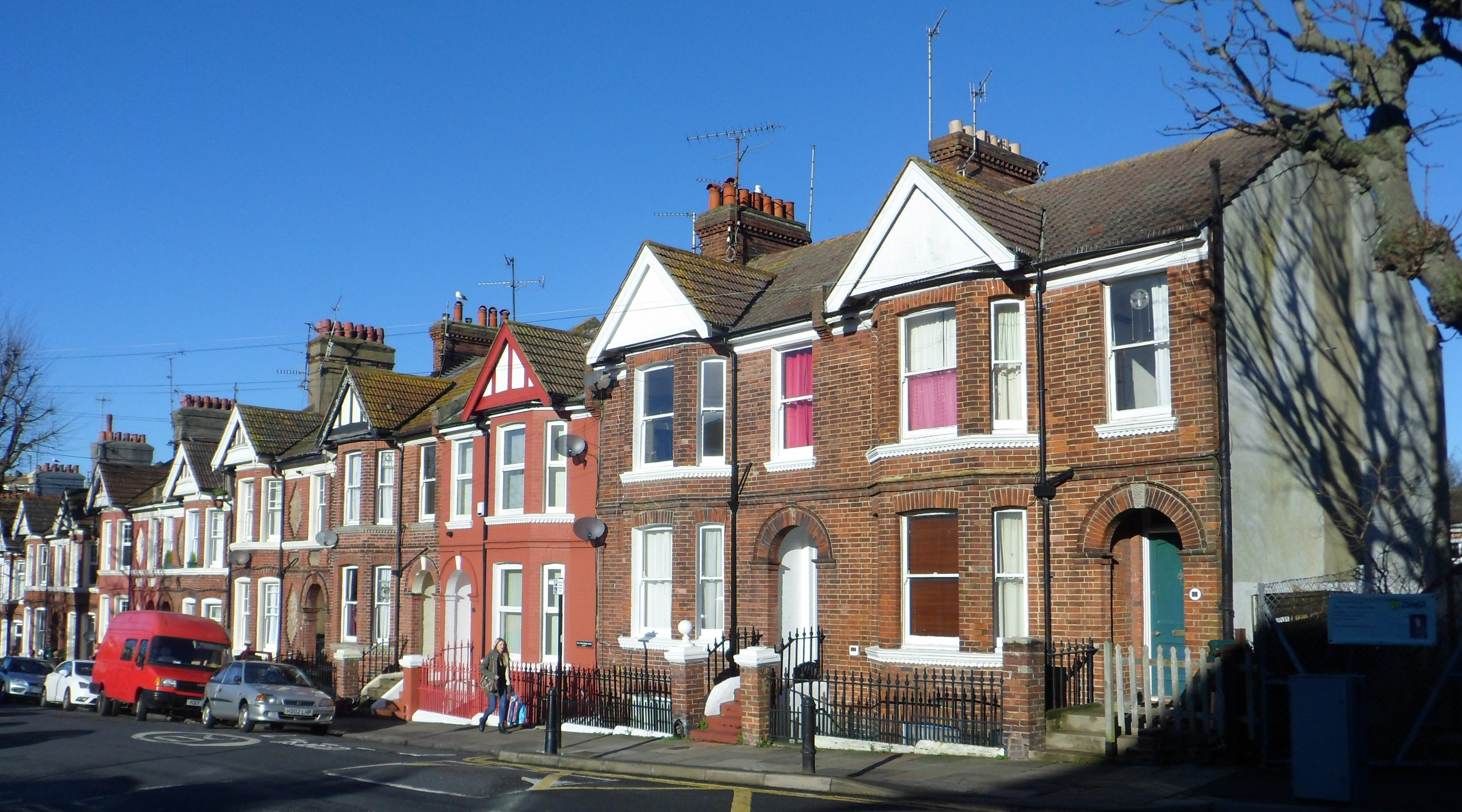
Hartington Road's housing is later, larger and predominantly features red brick.

The top (east) end of the road was undeveloped until the late 19th century, except for the Brighton Workhouse—built in 1865–67 to replace an earlier building established in the West Hill area in 1822. (The new workhouse also housed one of three fire-hoses which the town's earliest fire department, the Brighton Fire Establishment, could use in conjunction with its fire engines.) Residential development gradually spread eastwards up the hill from the 1860s, though. Between 1859 and 1864 Elm Grove itself was built up as far as Wellington Street, which was also laid out at the time. Infill development within this area continued in the late 1860s with Hastings Road and Franklin Road, followed in the early 1870s by Agnes Street, Franklin Street, De Montfort Road, Fairlight Place and St Martin's Place. Meanwhile, the Kemp Town branch line had opened in 1869, forming the eastern limit of the residential area until 1880 when Bonchurch Road, Brading Road and Totland Road were built further up the hill on a north–south alignment parallel with the line. Newmarket Road, Upper Wellington Road and Normanton Street filled in more gaps in the meantime, and Elm Grove itself was continuously built up as far as Totland Road by 1884. Hartington Road, the area's other major road, developed between 1885 and 1889 (north side) and a decade later on the south side. East of Bernard Road to the top of the hill remained undeveloped until 1900 but was quickly built up thereafter. The latest building took place around the junction of Whippingham Road and Hartington Road, between 1915 and 1919.

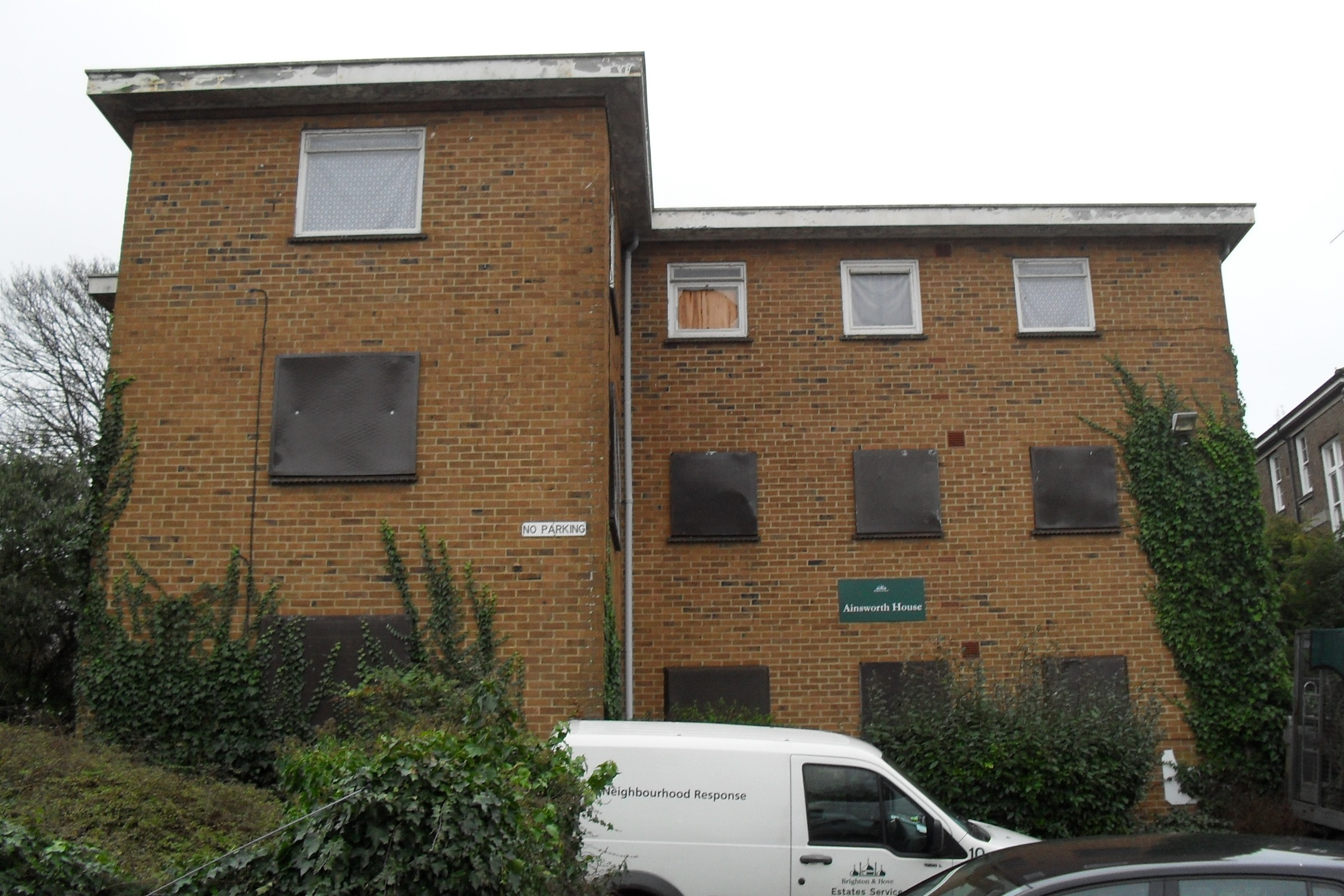
The derelict Ainsworth House (pictured in 2011) was demolished in 2013 and replaced with Brighton's first new council housing since the 1980s.

Among the houses built during this period of intense development were Brighton's earliest council houses. Two landowners donated land north of Elm Grove in 1897, and simple polychromatic brick cottages were built to commemorate Queen Victoria's Diamond Jubilee. They still stand on the north side of St Helen's Road. More council houses were built soon afterwards in nearby May Road, but these do not survive. A larger estate of council housing followed in the 1920s with the development of Pankhurst Avenue and surrounding streets on land southwest of the workhouse, as it was at the time. (Note: This development had the effect of joining up the Elm Grove area with the suburb of Queen's Park to the south. Housing had spread northwards from the park as far as the south side of Down Terrace by the late 1890s. The north side of Down Terrace, and all the land between there and the workhouse, remained undeveloped until the Pankhurst Estate was laid out.) The land had previously been used for allotments. Pankhurst Avenue was developed in the early 1920s along with nearby streets such as Glynde, Plumpton and Firle Roads; infill housing at Clayton and Hallett Roads followed in the 1930s. "Uniform, low-density semi-detached houses" characterise these streets, which are also dominated by the hospital buildings.

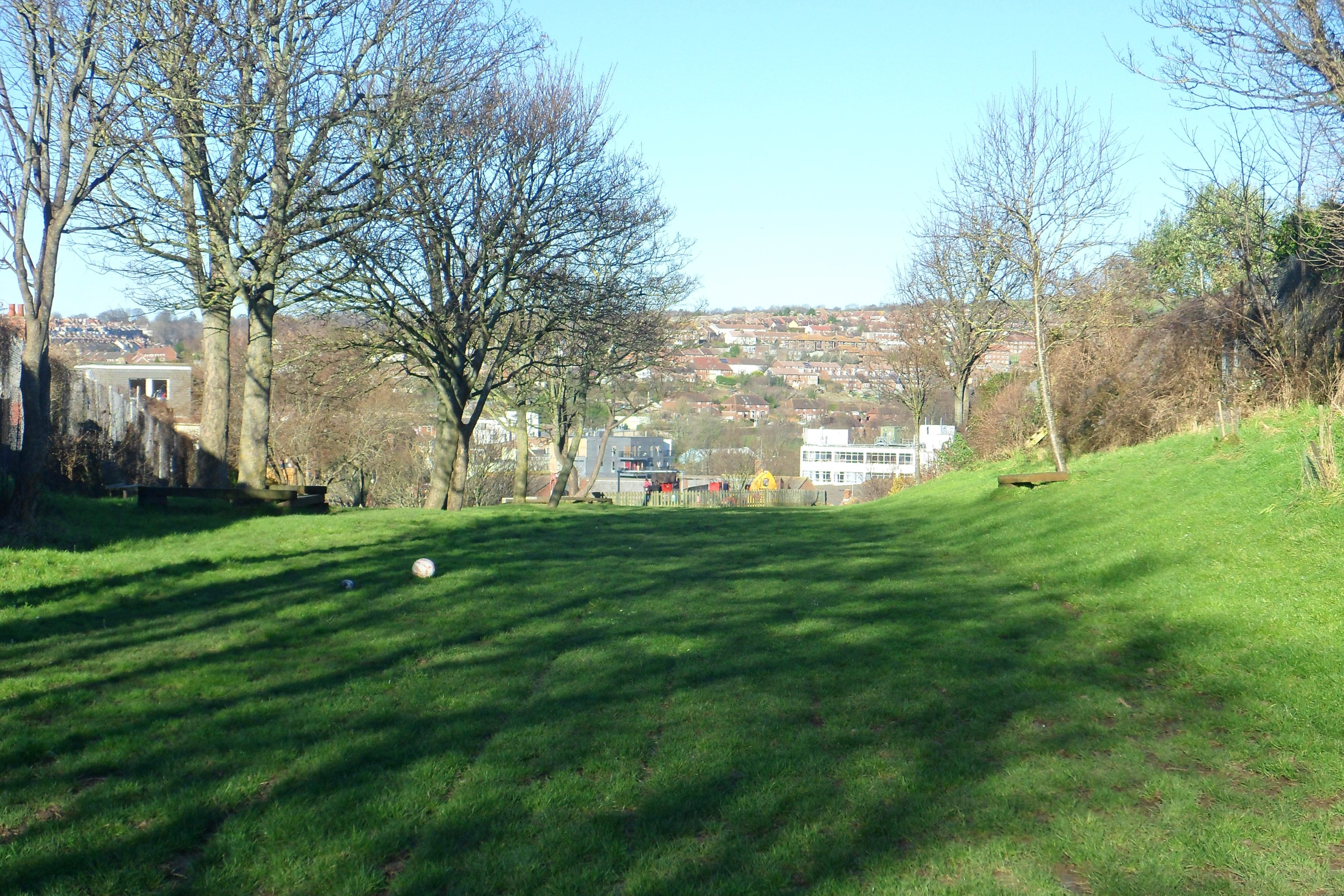
William Clarke Park occupies a former railway cutting.

The area was affected by bombing during the Brighton Blitz. The Franklin Arms pub at the junction of Lewes Road and Franklin Road was destroyed on 20 September 1940, killing the licensee, his wife and another woman. On 22 October 1943, a bomb intended for the railway viaduct over Lewes Road missed and detonated in the cutting behind Bonchurch Road, damaging or destroying houses and a laundry in the road, Seville Street and Wellington Street. Elm Grove School was also damaged.

After the Kemp Town branch line closed, the former railway cutting—a long and narrow area of land between Hartington Road and Elm Grove—became available for redevelopment. Labour councillor and former Mayor of Brighton William Clarke led a campaign to lay out a recreational area to serve the Elm Grove and Lewes Road areas, which are underprovided with open space. William Clarke Park (also known as The Patch) opened in the late 20th century and has been looked after by a community group, the Friends of William Clarke Park, since 1995. The park has a playground and can be accessed by paths from Hartington Road and Franklin Street. It is one of several parks in the city where the council can arrange for people to plant a commemorative tree.

In 1994 Elm Grove was featured as a climb in the Tour de France, where riders climbed it twice as part of a finishing circuit in Brighton on the first of two days' racing in Britain during that year's Tour.

In July 2010 the council announced plans to demolish Ainsworth House, a 1960s low-rise block on Wellington Road, and build a higher-density high-rise "family complex". These would be the first new council houses in Brighton since the 1980s. Planning permission was granted in April 2011, and the 15-home development called Balchin Court was opened in September 2013. In November 2011 squatters occupied had occupied Ainsworth House, which was in a dangerous condition because it contained asbestos. Also in 2010, planning permission was granted for the demolition of former nurses' homes facing Pankhurst Avenue and their replacement with three blocks of flats and a community centre. Of the 95 flats, 80% were to be classed as affordable housing, although in 2012 (by which time development had started) this was reduced to 40%.

== Demographics and community ==
Hanover and Elm Grove is one of the electoral wards of Brighton and Hove City Council where three local councillors are elected every four years. At the most recent election in 2023, three Labour councillors were elected with 48% of the overall vote, with the Greens coming second with 40%. Elected councillors have either been elected from Labour or the Greens.

The ward is part of the Brighton Pavilion parliamentary constituency, which elected Caroline Lucas of the Green Party at the 2010 General Election. Wards in Brighton have changed size and name many times over the years. The Elm Grove area was part of the Park ward, one of six, between 1854 and 1894. In that year, when the borough of Brighton was divided into 14 wards, the area came under Lewes Road ward. Next, an Elm Grove ward was created in 1928; then in 1983 it became Tenantry ward.

Demographic data is collated at ward level. The Hanover & Elm Grove ward covers also covers the Hanover suburb and part of the Carlton Hill/Albion Hill district, which have different characteristics, housing styles and population densities. For the ward overall in 2001, the population was about 13,000, the gross housing density was 68 dwellings per hectare (27.5 dwellings per acre), 50% of dwellings were terraced houses, and housing tenure was split 53%–47% between ownership and rental.

The Elm Grove area is popular with students. There are several streets in which the proportion of dwellings registered as student housing or houses in multiple occupation (HMO) exceeds 10%, and some, where more than 20% are of this type; and in the two years to April 2014, 430 HMO licences were granted in the Hanover & Elm Grove ward. In a feature about student housing in the city, the University of Sussex edition of online student newspaper The Tab claimed that "Elm Grove is probably the most average student area in Great Britain", with "decent" houses and atmosphere and "normal" levels of rent. In April 2013, the council introduced new Article Four Directions for HMO and student housing in the five wards with the highest density of such housing, including Hanover & Elm Grove ward. Planning permission is now required before a house can be converted for multiple occupancy.

The Hanover and Elm Grove Local Action Team (HEGLAT) is a voluntary group which brings together residents of the Hanover & Elm Grove ward and representatives of groups such as the police, council departments, elected councillors, transport operators and other agencies.

== Buildings ==
=== Churches ===
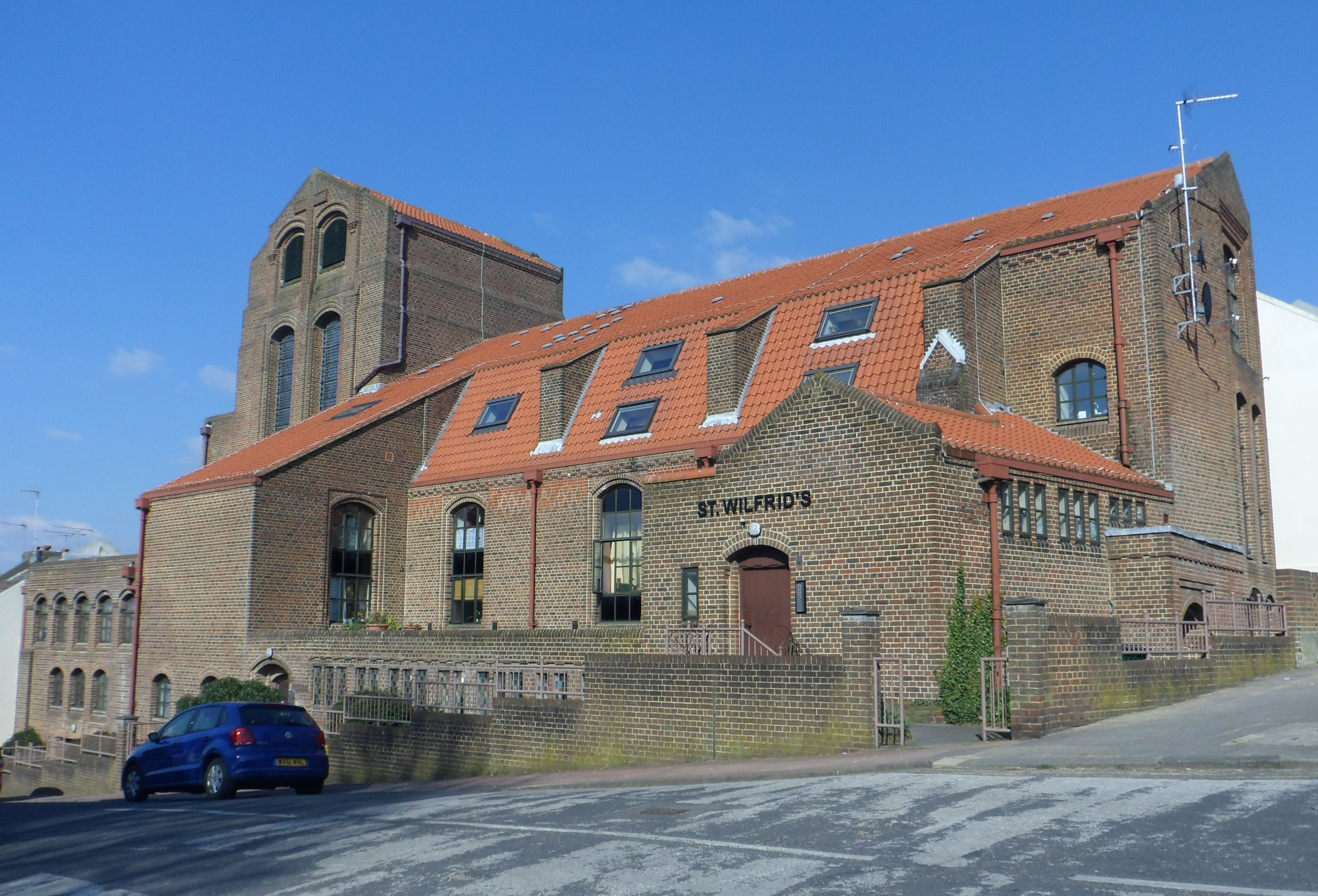
St Wilfrid's Church was the Anglican church serving the Elm Grove area. It is now in residential use.

There are two large and architecturally impressive churches on the north side of Elm Grove. At the triangular junction of Wellington Road stands St Joseph's Church, a Grade II*-listed Roman Catholic church built of Kentish Ragstone and Bath stone in the Early English Gothic Revival style. A Catholic chapel which had stood on the site since 1869 was replaced in 1879 with the first part of the present building, which was designed by William Kedo Broder. This was funded from the will of a local Catholic resident. The apse was added in 1880; Joseph Stanislaus Hansom designed the east end in 1883 and a side chapel and transept in 1885; and Frederick Walters added the west end in 1900–01. The "spectacular" church is "one of the grandest in the Diocese [of Arundel and Brighton]". A house on Wellington Road adjoining the church serves as the presbytery.

Further up Elm Grove at the junction of Whippingham Road is the former St Wilfrid's Church—a distinctive interwar Anglican church which has been converted into sheltered housing (St Wilfrid's Flats). Again, a temporary church (a tin tabernacle) was provided for worshippers until the permanent building was ready. A conventional district was formed in 1900, the tin building was ready in 1901, and it became a parish church in 1922 when a large parish was created. Local architect Harry Stuart Goodhart-Rendel was commissioned to design the permanent church once enough money had been raised, and work took place between 1932 and 1934. Architecturally, the church was "highly original" and "remarkable in its ingenuity", expressing elements of Eclecticism and Rationalism, and inside a mural by Hans Feibusch—his first work in the United Kingdom—has been retained. The church was declared redundant in 1980 because asbestos had been used in its construction. The church hall of 1926 survives further down Whippingham Road. When the church closed the parish was added to that of St Martin's Church on Lewes Road.

The former Emmanuel Full Gospel Church, an Assemblies of God chapel, occupied part of a building on De Montfort Road from 1932 until the late 20th century. Until 1994, a building at Bernard Road was used as a Jehovah's Witnesses Kingdom Hall; a new building at Woodingdean replaced it. Also registered for marriages until 2000 on the same road was the Whosoever Metropolitan Community Church and Worship Centre.

=== Institutional buildings ===
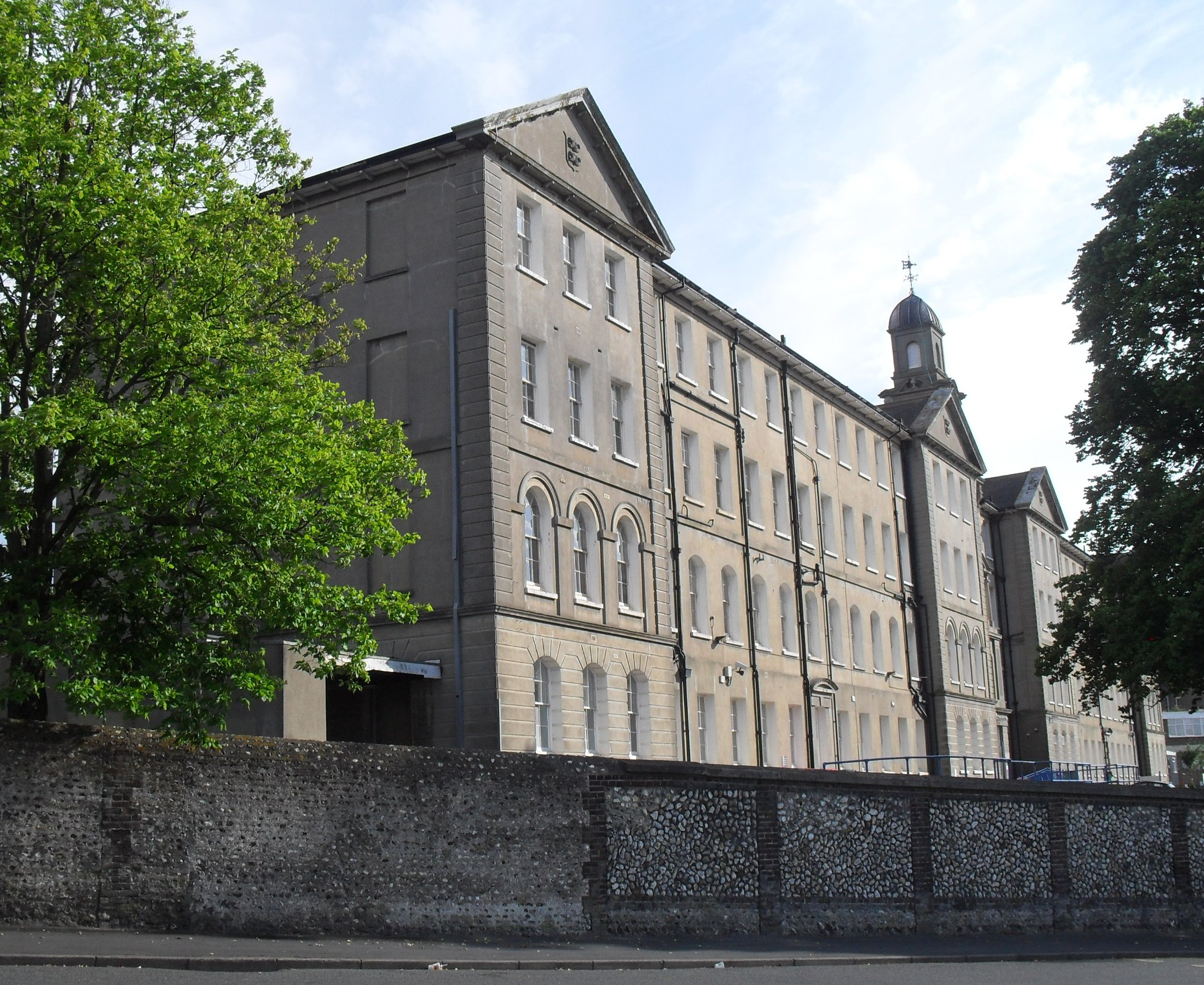
Brighton General Hospital was originally a workhouse.

Brighton General Hospital stands at the top of Elm Grove at the Queen's Park Road junction. The main building, which is Grade II-listed and forms the hospital's Arundel Building, was built as the Brighton workhouse between 1865 and 1867 by local architect George Maynard and the London firm of J.C. and G. Lansdown. It rises to four storeys and has a 37-window, stucco-faced Italianate façade. Other decoration includes a clock tower with a cupola and a pediment with carved dolphins (the Brighton coat of arms). During World War I it was used as a military hospital, then reverted to being a workhouse. It was renamed the Elm Grove Home in 1930, but most of the site became a hospital in 1935. The final workhouse inmates were moved to other sites in 1940. In 1948 the hospital took the name Brighton General. Many additions have been made in the 20th and 21st centuries, including an ambulance station to the west (built in 1951–52 on the former allotments of the workhouse). Since 2002 Brighton & Sussex Universities Hospital NHS Trust have run the hospital. Its hilltop position means it can be seen from many parts of the city.

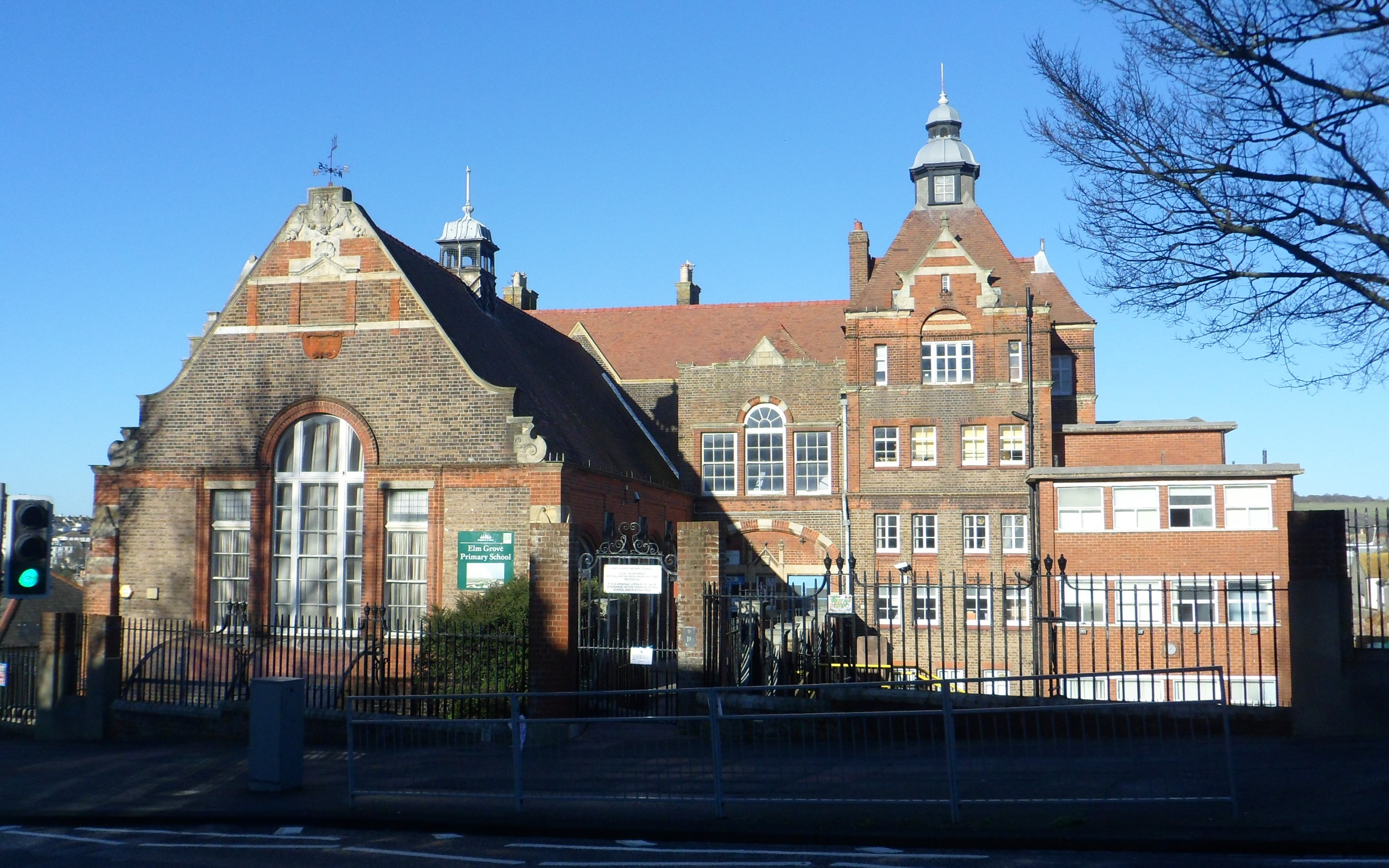
Elm Grove School dates from 1893.

Elm Grove Primary School was built in 1893 as one of "a distinguished group of board schools" erected by the Brighton and Preston School Board between 1870 and 1903. It was designed by the Board's architects Simpson & Son (Thomas Simpson and Gilbert Murray Simpson). Architecturally, the variegated brickwork, terracotta decoration and wide range of decorative elements is characteristic of the "distinguished group of Board schools" in the area. Under its present name, the school caters for more than 400 pupils between the ages of 4 and 11. It is mixed-sex and non-denominational. When it opened, 300 children moved across from the nearby Bentham Road Infants School; within a year 800 pupils were on the roll, and senior school-age pupils were also accommodated. Senior age boys were sent to other schools after 1928, and the school survived a closure threat in the 1980s as numbers fell further. Simpson also built a board school on Fairlight Place in 1870. This was altered in 1937 and is also still in use as a primary school.

At 12–14 Wellington Road stands the former Queen's Nurses Home. This opened on 12 October 1912 as a memorial to King Edward VII—a fact recorded on the late King's other memorial, the Peace Statue on the seafront. (Note: A plaque on the statue states in the year 1912 the inhabitants of brighton and hove provided a home for the queen's nurses and erected this monument in memory of EDWARD VII as a testimony of their enduring loyalty.) The building has been converted into flats.

== Transport ==
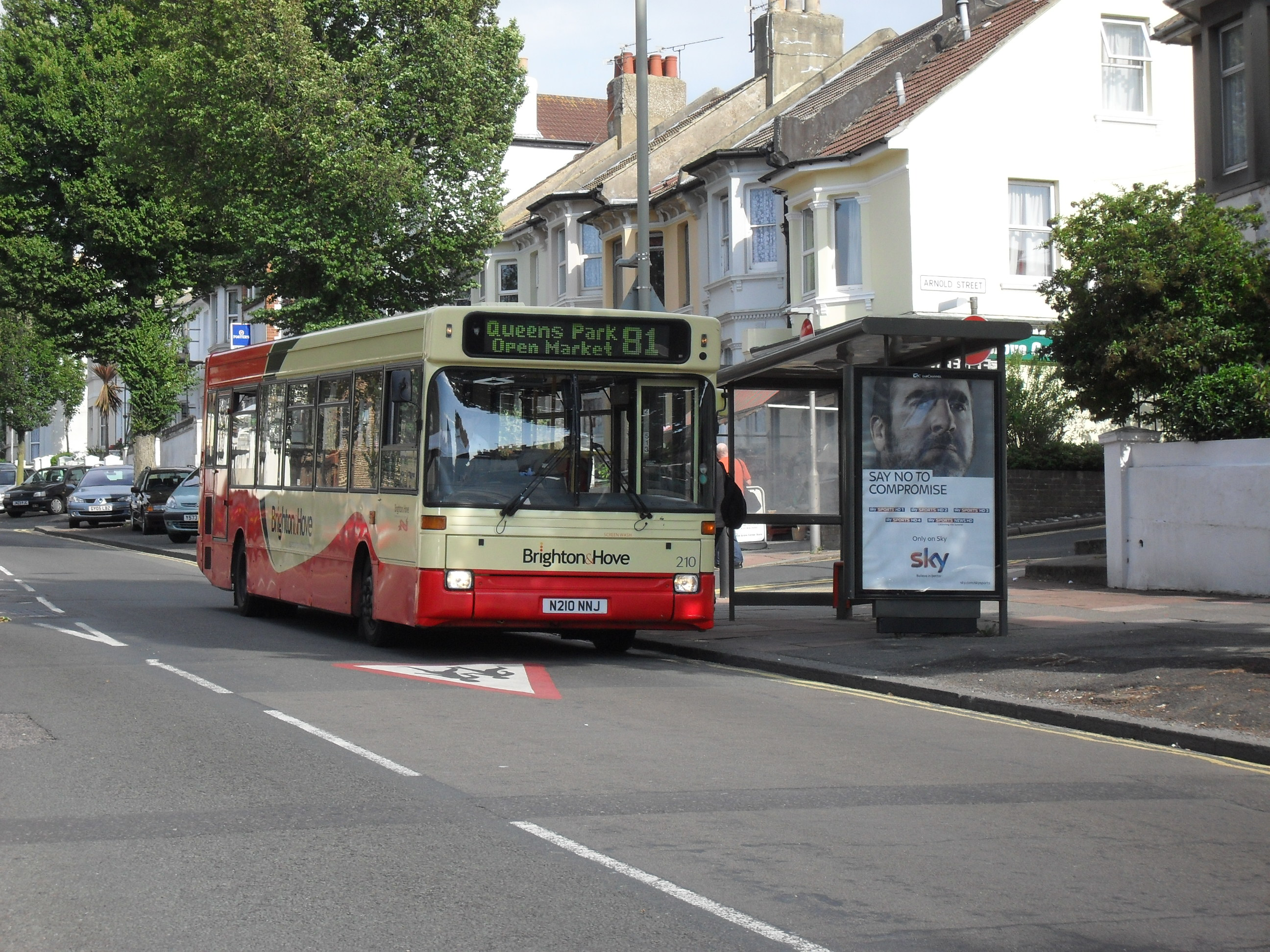
A Brighton & Hove bus operating the now withdrawn route 81 travels westwards down Elm Grove in 2010.

Elm Grove was one of the first roads in the city to be given a 20 mph speed limit when the council introduced the first phase of the city's 20 mph zones in April 2013. The limit now applies to every street in the Elm Grove area.

The Elm Grove area is well served by buses: Elm Grove itself is a major bus corridor. Brighton & Hove Bus Company route 22 (Churchill Square shopping centre–Woodingdean) runs along the full length of the road. Routes 18 (Brighton city centre–Queen's Park via Elm Grove westbound), 20 (Furze Hill, Hove–Queen's Park circular via Elm Grove eastbound), 21 (Goldstone Valley, Hove–Brighton Marina via Brighton railway station and Whitehawk) and 23 (Universities–Brighton Marina) run along the lower section as far as the Queen's Park Road junction. Route 2 (Shoreham-by-Sea/Steyning–Rottingdean) runs close to Brighton General Hospital, as does Compass Travel Route 37B which also serves Pankhurst Avenue and the full length of Hartington Road. Routes 18 and 20 were introduced in April 2014 to replace route 81 and its variants which had previously served Elm Grove.

From 1869 until 1933, passenger trains ran on the Kemp Town branch line between Brighton station and Kemp Town station. Freight services continued until 1971. The heavily engineered line entered the Elm Grove area on a three-arch viaduct across Hartington Road, then passed through a deep cutting, entered the 1,024-yard (936 m)-long Kemp Town Tunnel under Elm Grove School and emerged from the tunnel at the terminus on Eastern Road. The tunnel has been blocked up (and was briefly used as a mushroom farm) and the cutting filled in and grassed over to form William Clarke Park. A landscaped area behind the school occupies the site of the northern portal. The Hartington Road viaduct was removed in 1973; a housing development called Old Viaduct Court occupies the site. Nearby was the former Hartington Road Halt, which was only in use between 1906 and 1911.

Brighton Corporation Tramways operated tram routes along Elm Grove between 25 November 1901 and 1 September 1939, when the system was closed down. Service E ran between the seafront terminus at Brighton Aquarium near Old Steine and the top of Elm Grove every 10 minutes; Service Q connected the seafront and Queen's Park, providing an additional 10-minute frequency service between Lewes Road and Queen's Park Road; and Service C operated between Seven Dials and Queen's Park avoiding central Brighton. The end-to-end fare for each route was 2d, and the average journey time from the top of Elm Grove to the Aquarium was 18 minutes. On race days at Brighton Racecourse, extra trams would be provided along Elm Grove to move large numbers of people to and from the town centre. Trolleybuses replaced the tram routes immediately after World War II, but conventional buses replaced them by 1961. The trolleybus routes along Elm Grove ceased on 24 March 1959.

== See also ==
- List of places of worship in Brighton and Hove
- Media related to Elm Grove, Brighton at Wikimedia Commons

== Bibliography ==
- Antram, Nicholas; Morrice, Richard (2008). Brighton and Hove. Pevsner Architectural Guides. London: Yale University Press. ISBN 978-0-300-12661-7.
- Brighton Polytechnic. School of Architecture and Interior Design (1987). A Guide to the Buildings of Brighton. Macclesfield: McMillan Martin. ISBN 978-1-869865-03-0.
- Carder, Timothy (1990). The Encyclopaedia of Brighton. Lewes: East Sussex County Libraries. ISBN 978-0-86147-315-1.
- Collis, Rose (2010). The New Encyclopaedia of Brighton. (based on the original by Tim Carder) (1st ed.). Brighton: Brighton & Hove Libraries. ISBN 978-0-9564664-0-2.
- Dale, Antony (1976). Brighton Town and Brighton People. Chichester: Phillimore & Co. ISBN 978-0-85033-219-3.
- Diocese of Arundel & Brighton (1971). Diocese of Arundel & Brighton Catholic Directory 1971. Purley: Diocese of Arundel & Brighton.
- Elleray, D. Robert (2004). Sussex Places of Worship. Worthing: Optimus Books. ISBN 978-0-9533132-7-3.
- Fines, Ken (2002). A History of Brighton & Hove. Chichester: Phillimore & Co. ISBN 978-1-86077-231-3.
- Harding, Peter A. (1999). The Kemp Town Branch Line. Knaphill: Peter A. Harding. ISBN 978-0-9523458-4-8.
- Harley, Robert J. (1992). Brighton's Tramways. Tramway Classics. Midhurst: Middleton Press. ISBN 978-1-873793-02-2.
- Jones, Lavender; Pollard, Jacqueline (1999). Hilly Laine to Hanover: a Brighton Neighbourhood. Brighton: Brighton Books Publishing. ISBN 978-1-901454-04-8.
- Nairn, Ian; Pevsner, Nikolaus (1965). The Buildings of England: Sussex. Harmondsworth: Penguin Books. ISBN 978-0-14-071028-1.
- Rowland, David (1997). The Brighton Blitz. Seaford: S.B. Publications. ISBN 978-1-85770-124-1.
