= Hartington Road Halt railway station =

Former railway station in England

Coordinates: 50.8347°N 0.1241°W

Hartington Road Halt
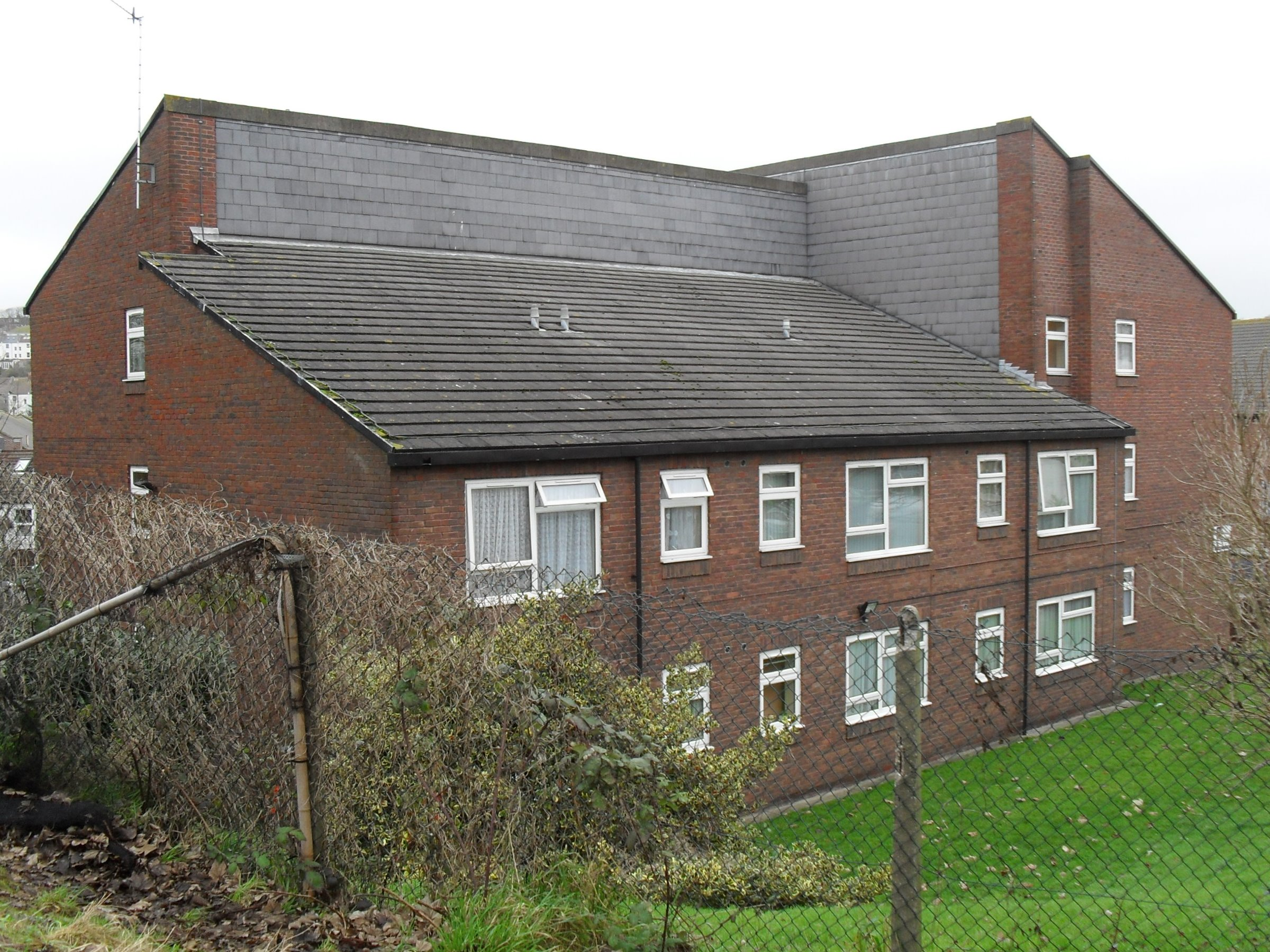
- The site of the halt in January 2011

General information
- Location: Hartington Road, Brighton
- Grid reference: TQ323056

Other information
- Status: Demolished

History
- Opened: 1 January 1906
- Closed: June 1911
- Original company: London, Brighton and South Coast Railway
Location

Hartington Road Halt railway station was a stop on the Kemp Town branch railway line between Brighton station and Kemp Town, Brighton, East Sussex. It was open only briefly between 1906 and 1911. The line it stood on was closed permanently in 1971 and has now been demolished.

== History ==
Hartington Road Halt opened on 1 January 1906 with access from both Hartington Road itself and Upper Wellington Road (a cul-de-sac in the Elm Grove district) by means of cinder paths. The opening of the halt coincided with the London, Brighton and South Coast Railway's (LB&SCR) use of single-class (Third Class only) petrol railmotor vehicles on the branch line, in place of conventional trains which carried First, Second and Third Class accommodation. Reports in various newspapers in December 1905 recorded the halt as having already been built. It was further stated that all trains on the branch line (29 per day, with three fewer on Sundays) would stop there and that tickets had to be bought from the conductor of the railmotor. Both the introduction of railmotors and the opening of the halt were an attempt to counter competition from trams: Brighton Corporation Tramways had operated a popular route along the nearby Lewes Road since November 1901. Hartington Road Halt was opened specifically to serve the adjacent cemeteries as well as residents of Hartington Road and neighbouring streets. Journey times from the halt were three minutes to the terminus at Kemp Town and two minutes to Lewes Road station; beyond the latter it was a further three minutes to London Road (Brighton) and eight to Brighton.

The single platform was on the west (Up) (Note: In British railway terminology, "Up" means "in the direction of London".) side of the line immediately south of the bridge over Hartington Road. It was 150 feet (46 m) long, 3 feet (0.91 m) wide and 7 feet (2.1 m) above the ground and had a gas lamp and a name-board, but no shelter. A short distance to the south, after passing through a cutting, the line entered Kemp Town Tunnel. The halt was on a short section of level ground between two long downhill gradients from Kemp Town Junction, where the branch left the Brighton–Lewes line.

The day after the halt opened, it was discovered that it had accidentally been opened illegally without authorisation from the Board of Trade, which at the time had to be informed of all railway station and halt openings so that they could be inspected. The Board only found out when a copy of the December 1905 newspaper article from The Times was sent to them along with a copy of the new railmotor timetable. On 2 January 1906 the Board wrote to the LB&SCR demanding an explanation as to why they had not been told about the new halt and had not been asked to inspect it. The LB&SCR's company secretary sent a "somewhat embarrassing" reply stating that he had mistakenly overlooked the requirement because the halt had been built in the same way as others on the LB&SCR network and no alterations had been made to the line or its signalling. A Board of Trade inspector visited on 5 January 1906 and confirmed he was satisfied with the halt.

The halt was unsuccessful: it was closed in April 1911. Two months later the Brighton Herald reported that a petition with 96 signatures had been presented to the LB&SCR requesting the closure (still described at that time as "the proposed closure") be rescinded. The LB&SCR's directors refused to change the decision, and the closure was formally ratified at some point in June 1911. The branch line itself closed to passengers on 1 January 1933; freight services continued until 1971, and final closure took place on 26 June 1971. Brighton Borough Council bought the line and its infrastructure and demolished it: Hartington Road Halt had already been cleared soon after it closed, but the adjacent bridge was demolished in December 1973. Flats were built there, and the site of Hartington Road Halt is now crossed by a footpath between the flats and William Clarke Park, which was built in the cutting between the road and Kemp Town Tunnel.

Preceding station	Disused railways	Following station
Lewes Road; Line and station closed	London, Brighton and South Coast Railway; Kemp Town branch line	Kemp Town; Line and station closed

== Bibliography ==
- Carder, Timothy (1990). The Encyclopaedia of Brighton. Lewes: East Sussex County Libraries. ISBN 978-0-86147-315-1.
- Cooper, B.K. (1991). Rail Centres: Brighton. London: Ian Allan Ltd. ISBN 0-7110-1155-9.
- Harding, Peter A. (1999). The Kemp Town Branch Line. Knaphill: Peter A. Harding. ISBN 978-0-9523458-4-8.
