= Kemp Town railway station =

Closed station in Brighton, England

Coordinates: 50°49′18″N 0°07′27″W

Kemp Town
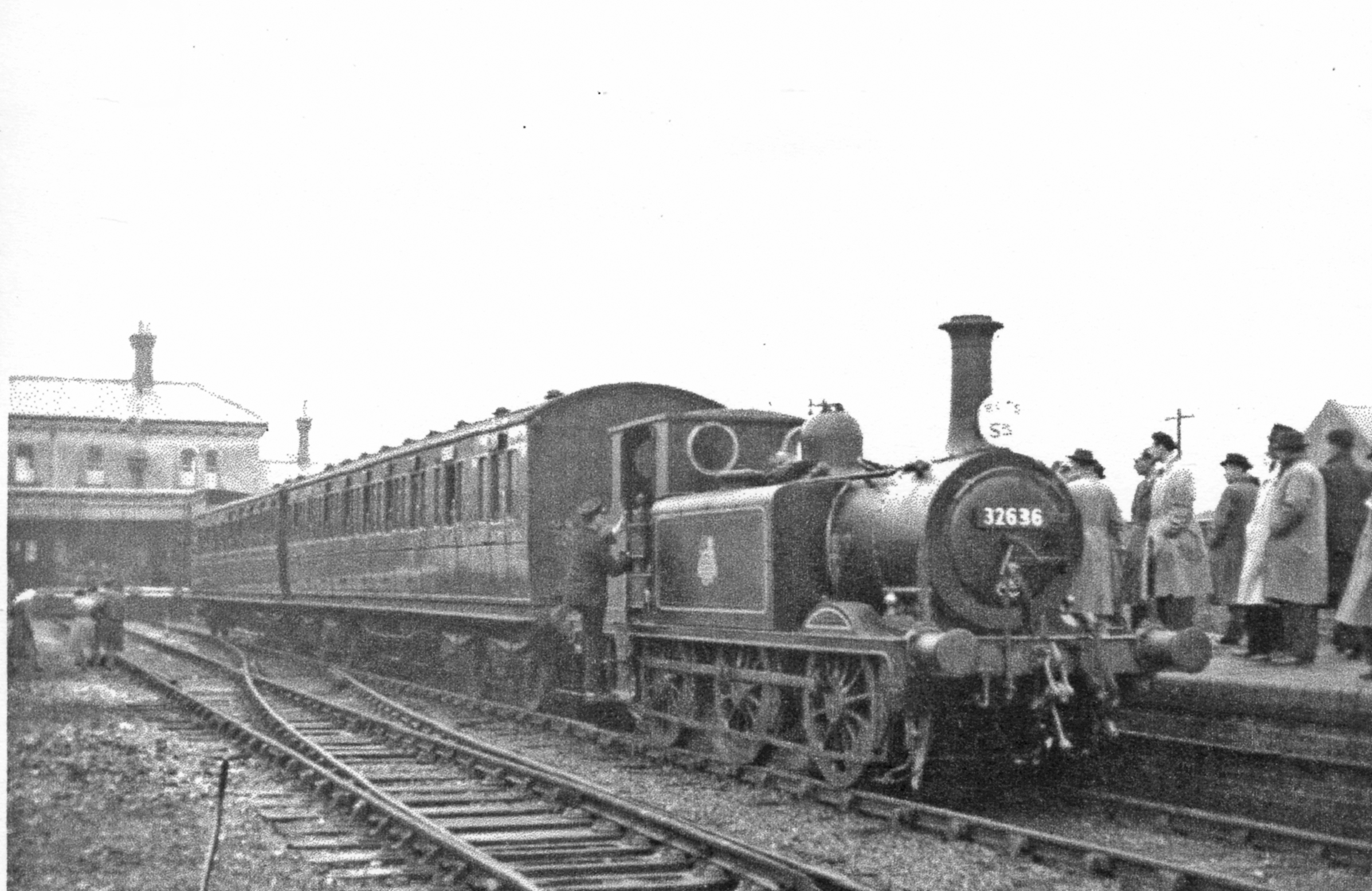
- A train at the station in 1952, viewed from the north

General information
- Location: Kemptown, Brighton & Hove; England
- Grid reference: TQ321041
- Platforms: 1

Other information
- Status: Disused

History
- Pre-grouping: London, Brighton and South Coast Railway
- Post-grouping: Southern Railway; Southern Region of British Railways

Key dates
- 1869: Station opened
- 1 January 1917: closed
- 19 August 1919: opened
- 1933: Station closed to passengers
- June 1971: Station closed to freight
- 26 June 1971: Special train service ran
Location

Kemp Town railway station was the terminus station of the Kemp Town branch line, a short branch line serving the Kemptown district of Brighton, England.

The branch line opened in 1869, running from a junction off the Brighton to Lewes line between London Road and Moulsecoomb stations. It was expensive to construct, requiring a tunnel and a large viaduct.

The passenger service declined after 1917 due to tramway competition, and ceased at the end of 1932, but goods trains continued to operate on the line until 1971.

== Opening ==
The Kemp Town branch line opened to traffic on 2 August 1869. There was a formal ceremonial opening on 6 August.

Although the line was constructed as a single line, and the terminus had only one platform, extensive land was acquired around the Kemp Town terminus for future development. During the 1870s, the goods yard was extended.

== Development ==
In 1923 the LBSCR was made a constituent of the new Southern Railway following the Railways Act 1921. The Southern Railway decided to withdraw the passenger service on the line and the last passenger trains ran on 31 December 1932.

== After passenger closure ==
The signal boxes at Kemp Town and Lewes Road were decommissioned and "one engine in steam" working was instituted on the line for the one or two daily goods trains; this arrangement started on 29 July 1933. There was an occasional Sunday School special excursion and enthusiasts specials on the line after passenger closure.

The branch continued in use for goods purposes, and British Railways found it convenient to use Kemp Town goods station as a relief to the congested main goods depot of Brighton. A special passenger train service ran on 26 June 1971. The line finally closed on 14 August 1971.

== Accidents and incidents ==
Two incidents where trains ran into the buffer stops at the end of the line in the station:

- On 9 July 1902, a passenger train ran into the buffer stops. There were no fatalities, but several passengers reported they had been injured. Otherwise, little damage occurred. The driver afterwards asserted that the brakes were faulty, but others reported that the brakes were in good working order. The official report concluded that the driver had failed to take into account the longer-than-usual length of the train (engine hauling 11 vehicles) and hence its heavier weight would require greater braking being applied.
- On 8 January 1963, during an unusually cold winter, a freight train slid on iced-up rails through the buffer stops and into the station office. Two office staff escaped injury because they happened not to be in it at the time.

== Land use since closure ==
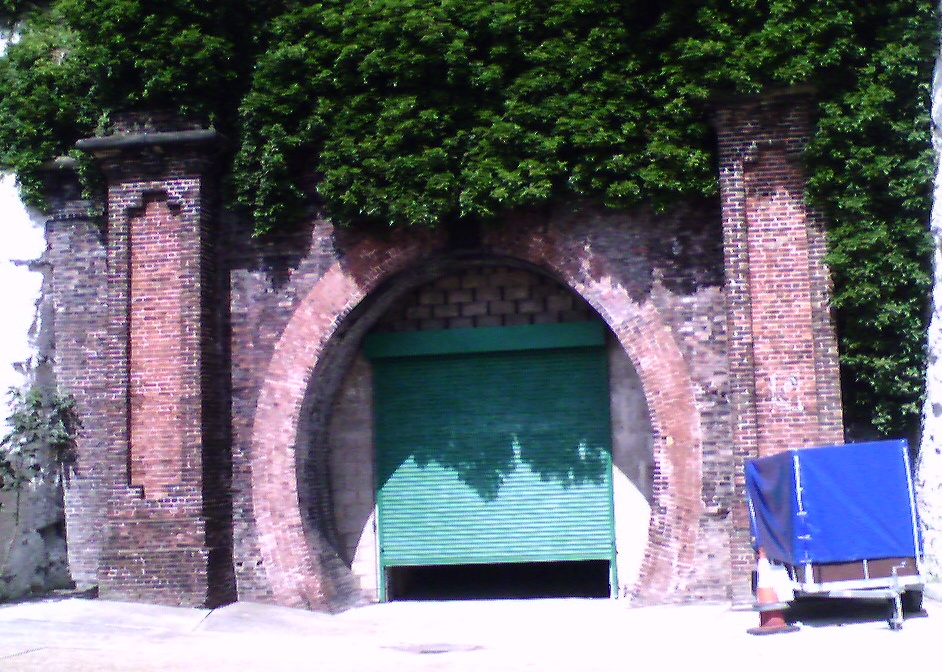
Tunnel portal at the north of the former station site, leading under Elm Grove

The site of Kemp Town station has been redeveloped as the Freshfield Industrial Estate. The only remaining evidence of a station is the portal of the railway tunnel to the north. This can be seen from the compound of a self-storage warehouse.

Preceding station	Disused railways	Following station
Hartington Road; Line and station closed	London, Brighton and South Coast Railway; Kemp Town branch line	Terminus

== See also ==
- List of closed railway stations in Britain
- Transport in Brighton and Hove
