= LRB =

LRB may refer to:

- Love Runs Blind, a Bangladeshi rock band
- Lego Rock Band, a game in the Rock Band video game series
- Liquid rocket booster
- Little Red Book, quotations from Chairman Mao
- Little River Band, an Australian music act
- London Review of Books, a British journal of literary and intellectual essays
- Lonesome River Band, an American bluegrass band
- London Road (Brighton) railway station, a railway station in Sussex, England

== See also ==
- L:RB, stock symbol for the consumer goods company Reckitt Benckiser
