= Lewes Road railway station =

Former railway station in England

Coordinates: 50.8376°N 0.1268°W

Lewes Road railway station was a railway station in Brighton, East Sussex. It was located on the now closed Kemp Town branch line which first opened in 1869. The station opened on 1 September 1873 and was closed to passengers in 1933 but the line remained opened for goods trains until 1971.

The layout of the station was quite unusual, as the single track that passed through it had a platform either side of it linked by a footbridge. Entry to the station was via a covered staircase situated next to the first arch of the viaduct across Lewes Road.

After the station was closed to passengers the platform buildings were used as a pickle factory, before being demolished during the 1950s. The platforms were intact when the line was completely closed in 1971. The site was redeveloped during the 1980s and no trace of the station now remains.

Preceding station	Disused railways	Following station
London Road; Line closed, station open	London, Brighton and South Coast Railway; Kemp Town branch line	Hartington Road Halt; Line and station closed
