= St Joseph's Church, Brighton =

St Joseph's Church
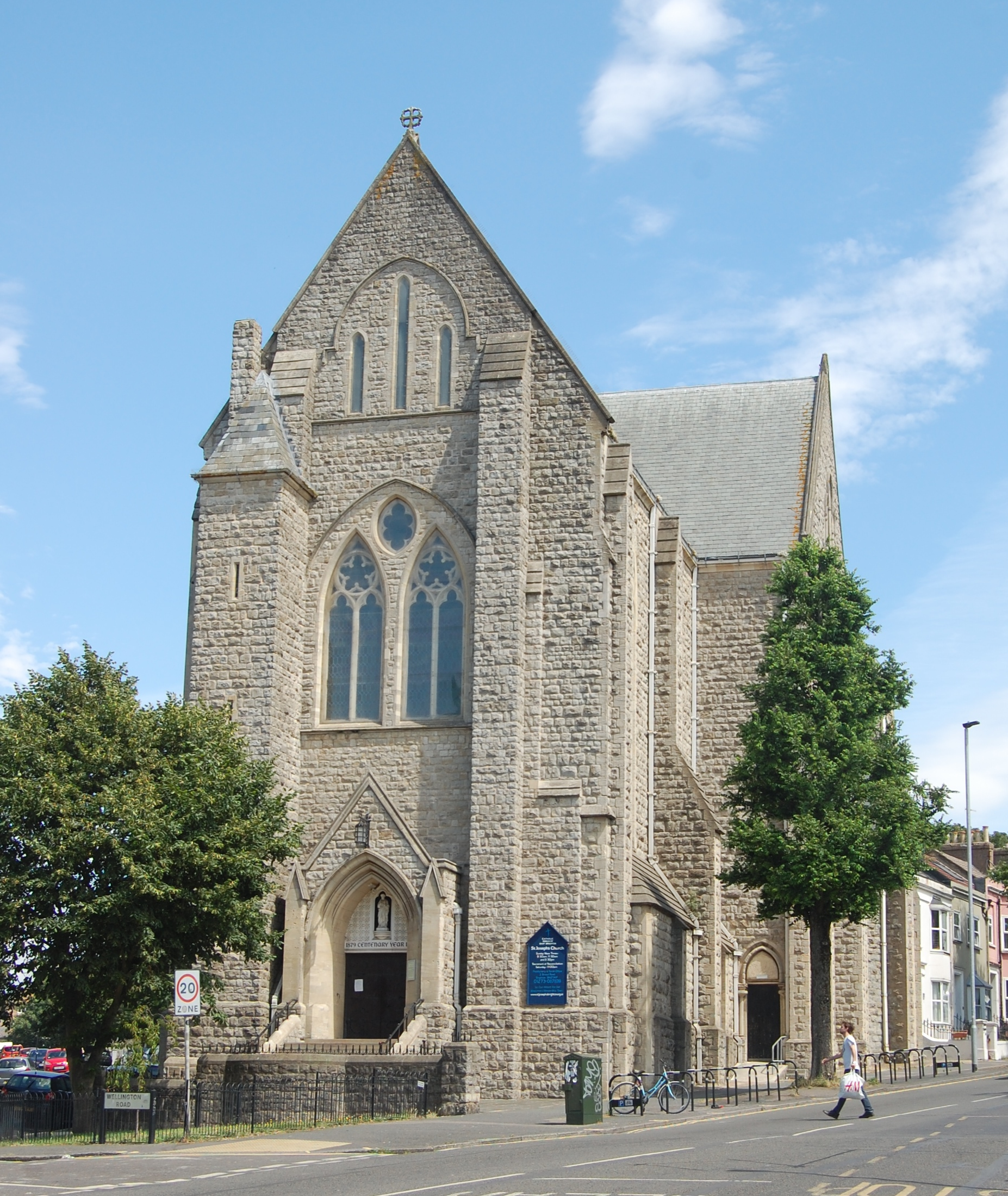
- The church from the southwest
- St Joseph's Church
- 50.8320°N 0.1279°W
- Location: Wellington Road/Elm Grove, Brighton, Brighton and Hove BN2 3AA
- Country: England
- Denomination: Roman Catholic
- Website: www.stjosephsbrighton.org.uk/

History
- Status: Parish church
- Founded: 1866
- Dedication: Saint Joseph
- Dedicated: 8 May 1979

Architecture
- Functional status: Active
- Heritage designation: Grade II* listed
- Designated: 19 July 1985
- Architect(s): William Kedo Broder, J.S. Hansom, F.A. Walters
- Style: Early English Gothic Revival
- Groundbreaking: 1866
- Completed: 1906

Administration
- Diocese: Arundel and Brighton
- Deanery: Brighton and Hove
- Parish: Brighton, St Joseph with St Francis

Clergy
- Priest(s): Canon Kieron O'Brien and Deacon Stephen Sharpe

St Joseph's Church is a Roman Catholic church in the Elm Grove area of Brighton, part of the English city of Brighton and Hove. It is one of eleven Roman Catholic churches in the city. The church was built in several stages beginning in 1879, and outstanding debts meant that its official dedication did not take place until 1979. It has been listed at Grade II* by English Heritage in view of its architectural importance.

== History ==
Elm Grove was built to connect the Lewes Road, which ran into the centre of Brighton, and Brighton Racecourse at the top of Race Hill. The road was laid out on the steeply sloping site in the 1850s, and rapid residential development occurred over the next decade. More houses were built later in the 19th century on the road itself and on streets running to the north and south, and by 1900 the area was densely populated.

A Roman Catholic place of worship has existed at the bottom (west) end of Elm Grove since the late 1860s. Recent research has found that a temporary mission chapel, completed in 1869, stood on the site now occupied by St Joseph's. (Older sources suggested that the building completed in that year was the first part of the present church structure.) A local resident, Matthew Haddock, died in the 1870s; in his will he expressed a wish for a permanent church to be built to replace the mission chapel, and his wife donated £10,000 of bonds to fund this. Architect William Kedo Broder designed a tall stone building in accordance with Mrs Haddock's proposals, and the first part of the building—the sanctuary and part of the nave—was opened in May 1879. In 1880 the sanctuary was enlarged and the apse was built. Before any more of Kedo Broder's designs could be realised, he was killed in January 1881, falling from a moving train.

J.S. Hansom, a member of a family of architects known for their work on Roman Catholic churches, was commissioned to continue the project. His plans were less ambitious, and by 1883 he had completed the east end of the church, which consisted of one polygonal apse flanked by two smaller versions. The next stage, completed in 1885, included a side chapel and a south transept, which was smaller than Hansom had intended.

The next alteration came in 1900, when another architect, Frederick Walters, was commissioned to build the west front. His plans were designed to complement the existing structure, and included a tower which was never built. The work was completed in March 1901. The final period of building work took place in 1906; this included a north transept and side chapel, and the enlargement of their counterparts on the south side. The church reopened for worship on 6 May 1906.

Only minor alterations have been made since the 1906 work: in the 1970s one of the side chapels was reconfigured in the style of the Grotto at the Sanctuary of Our Lady of Lourdes in France, and the sanctuary itself was reordered. Later in the decade, the church received its official dedication after a longstanding problem with a debt had been resolved. This happened on 8 May 1979, 100 years to the month after building work began. By 1906, £15,000 (£1,580,000 in 2025) had been spent on construction.

The church is licensed for worship in accordance with the Places of Worship Registration Act 1855 and has the registration number 24702.

== Architecture ==
The exterior of St Joseph's Church is of two types of stone: Kentish Ragstone (a type of limestone) with dressings of Bath Stone. The east end has three five-sided apses; the outer pair form side chapels. All three have windows with trefoil designs. The entrance is at the west end in a porch with a gabled roof. The chancel has seven bays and is separated from the nave by an intricate chancel arch. The nave has low, narrow aisles on the south and north sides. The church is very tall, and the roof is vaulted; the shafts are of pale brick and stone.

== The church today ==
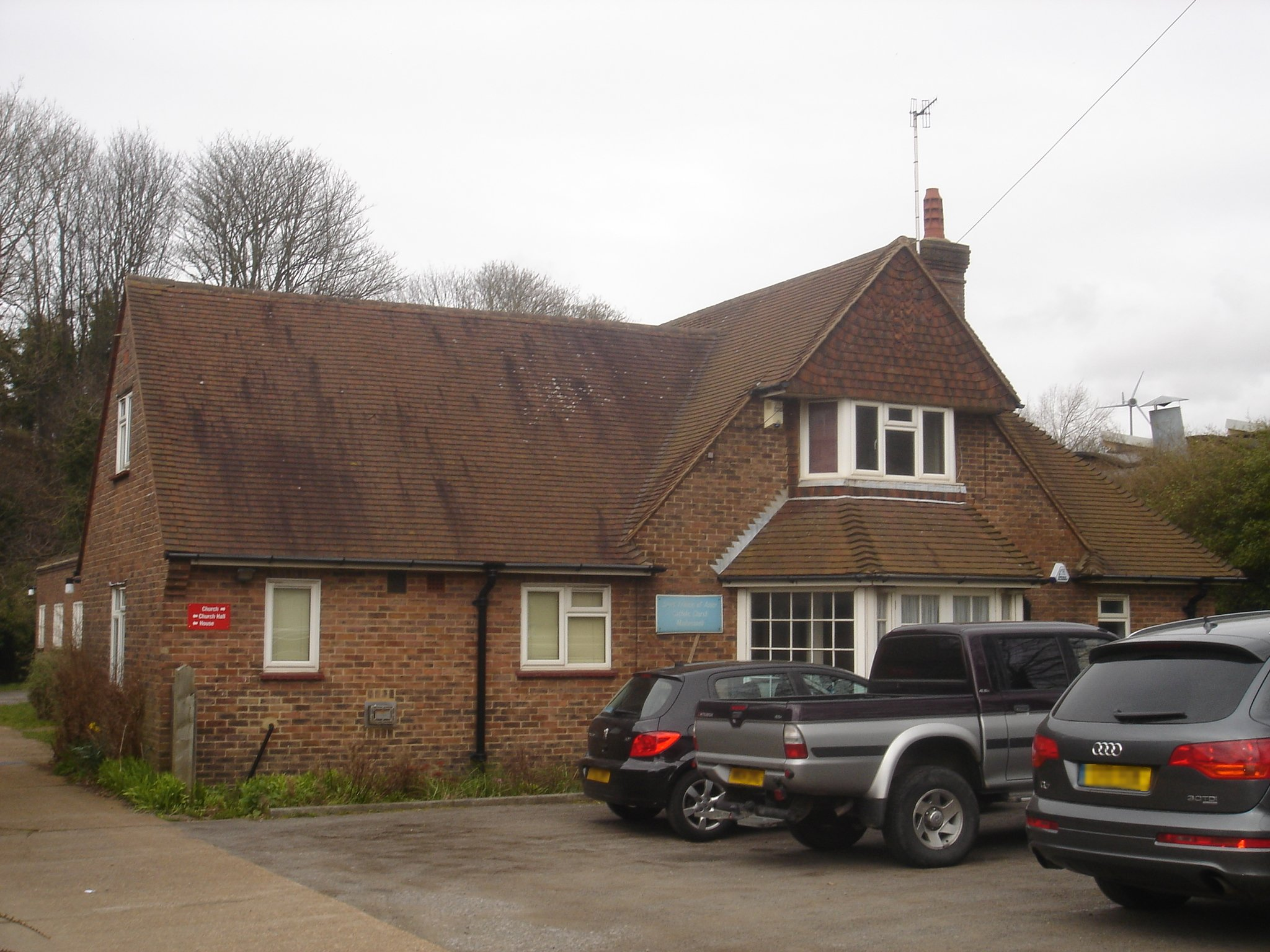
St Francis of Assisi's Church, Moulsecoomb—administered from St Joseph's

St Joseph's Church was listed at Grade II* by English Heritage on 19 July 1985. This status is given to "particularly important buildings of more than special interest". In February 2001, it was one of 70 Grade II*-listed buildings and structures, and 1,218 listed buildings of all grades, in the city of Brighton and Hove.

The church is one of eleven Roman Catholic churches in the city of Brighton and Hove, and one of six in Brighton itself (there are also three in Hove and one each in Rottingdean and Woodingdean). It is responsible for the administration of St Francis of Assisi's church on the Moulsecoomb estate in northeast Brighton. Originally an Anglican place of worship, this was reconsecrated as a Roman Catholic church in 1953.

== See also ==
- Grade II* listed buildings in Brighton and Hove
- List of places of worship in Brighton and Hove

== Bibliography ==
- Carder, Timothy (1990). The Encyclopaedia of Brighton. Lewes: East Sussex County Libraries. ISBN 0-86147-315-9.
- Elleray, D. Robert (2004). Sussex Places of Worship. Worthing: Optimus Books. ISBN 0-9533132-7-1.
- Nairn, Ian; Pevsner, Nikolaus (1965). The Buildings of England: Sussex. Harmondsworth: Penguin Books. ISBN 0-14-071028-0.
