= Kemp Town branch line =

Defunct English railway line

Kemp Town branch line was a railway line running from Brighton to Kemptown in England. It operated between 1869 and 1971. It ran from a junction off the Brighton to Lewes line between London Road and Moulsecoomb stations, to Kemp Town railway station. It opened in 1869 and was expensive to construct, requiring a tunnel and a large viaduct.

The passenger service declined after 1917 due to tramway competition, and ceased at the end of 1932, but goods trains continued to operate on the line until 1971.

For a time during the Second World War the tunnel on the branch was used for night storage of main-line passenger stock, as a precaution against bomb damage from enemy action.

Pre-grouping, the line was operated by the London, Brighton and South Coast Railway. Post-grouping it was operated by the Southern Railway then the Southern Region of British Railways.

== First proposals ==
Development of rail in Brighton and Hove 1840–1945 (animation)

The railway line from Brighton to Lewes was authorised under the Brighton, Lewes and Hastings Railway Act 1844 (7 & 8 Vict. c. xci), and it was opened on 8 June 1846.

On 27 July 1846, royal assent was given to the act of Parliament authorising the merging of the London and Brighton Railway and the London and Croydon Railway, forming the London, Brighton and South Coast Railway (LBSCR).

The LBSCR became dominant in the Brighton area, but in 1863 a nominally independent company encouraged by the London, Chatham and Dover Railway promoted a line from near Beckenham through East Grinstead to Lewes, and intended to terminate in Brighton at the Kemp Town district. Kemp Town was a quality residential area built in the Regency style by the developer Thomas Read Kemp in the 1820s.

The line was stated to be likely to cost more than £4 million and to require over six miles (9.7 km) of tunnelling.

London, Brighton and South Coast Railway (Kemptown Station and Line) Act 1864
- Act of Parliament
- Parliament of the United Kingdom
- Long title: An Act to enable the London, Brighton, and South Coast Railway Company to provide Station Accommodation at Kemp Town, Brighton, and to construct a new Railway in connexion therewith; and for other Purposes.
- Citation: 27 & 28 Vict. c. xxxv

Dates
- Royal assent: 13 May 1864

The railway proposal was rejected in the House of Commons, but its supporters made it clear that they intended to try again in the 1864 parliamentary session. The LBSCR was alarmed at this planned incursion into territory they considered to be exclusively theirs, and as a defensive measure they promoted the short Kemp Town branch railway in the same 1864 session. The LBSCR scheme was approved as the London, Brighton and South Coast Railway (Kemptown Station and Line) Act 1864 (27 & 28 Vict. c. xxxv) on 13 May 1864, and the rival proposal was again rejected.

The LBSCR branch was to leave the Brighton to Lewes line and turn south to reach the Kemp Town terminus. Although the line was only to be 1 mile 32 chains in length, it was to be costly as land in the high-amenity area was expensive, and both a tunnel and a 14-arch viaduct (crossing Lewes Road) would be required. Capital required for the line was £75,000.

The engineer for the work was Frederick Dale Banister of the LBSCR, and the contractors were William and Jonathan Pickering; they hired a 0-6-0 tender engine from the LBSCR for the construction work, which started on 17 February 1866.

== Opening ==
Col. Yolland of the Board of Trade inspected the completed work on 9 July 1869, and approved it. The line opened to traffic on 2 August 1869. There was a formal ceremonial opening on 6 August.

The first locomotive intended to work trains on the line was a 2-4-0 from Sharp, Stewart and Company, but it was not delivered in time for the opening, so a locomotive was borrowed from the LBSCR.

Although the line was constructed as a single line, and the terminus had only one platform, extensive land was acquired around the Kemp Town terminus for future development.

== Development ==
As suburban development progressed, there was demand for an intermediate stop, and Lewes Road station was opened on 1 September 1873. London Road station, nearby on the Brighton to Lewes line opened on 1 October 1877 and was served by branch passenger trains.

In the first decade of the twentieth century, railways were exploring ways to provide more frequent, lower-cost ways of providing local passenger facilities, and the LBSCR introduced petrol-engined railcars in the early 1900s. They had 48 seats and were acquired from Dick Kerr.

A new halt for residents and to serve the local cemetery was opened on 1 January 1906; it was named Hartington Road Halt.

The Brighton and South Coast Railway Company are about to substitute rail motor-cars on their branch line between Brighton and Kemp Town for the existing trains of the ordinary first, second and third-class type of carriages. The new service will commence on January 1st. It will be performed by petrol-driven cars of one class only, each capable of seating forty-eight passengers. A platform has been erected between Kemp Town and Lewes-road, to be known as "Hartington-road halt", where all cars will call to take up and set down passengers.

However the Company had neglected to obtain Board of Trade approval for the new station, and when the opening was announced in the trade press, the Board of Trade wrote requiring an explanation. The Company was rebuked, and an inspection was carried out by Col. von Donop on 5 January 1906; the facilities were found to be satisfactory.

At this time there were 29 passenger train journeys each way on weekdays, and 26 on Sundays instead of the former seventeen and six respectively with steam operation. However the petrol railcars were very unreliable mechanically, and a disastrous breakdown resulted in their withdrawal and the introduction of steam-powered push and pull trains.

Hartington Road Halt proved to be unsuccessful and was closed on 1 June 1911.

== From 1914 ==
During the First World War the line was closed from 1 January 1917 as an economy measure. It was reopened to passenger trains on 19 August 1919, (Note: According to Harding 1 September 1919; Quick says 19 August 1919.) but goods train operation was not restored until 2 January 1922. The passenger closure period proved disastrous to the branch, as the public had transferred to trams and become accustomed to the convenience of that travel mode over the short distance involved. Although the passenger train service was increased to 36 journeys daily, the decline in carryings continued.

In 1923 the LBSCR was made a constituent of the new Southern Railway following the Railways Act 1921. The Southern Railway decided to withdraw the passenger service on the line and the last passenger trains ran on 31 December 1932.

== After passenger closure ==
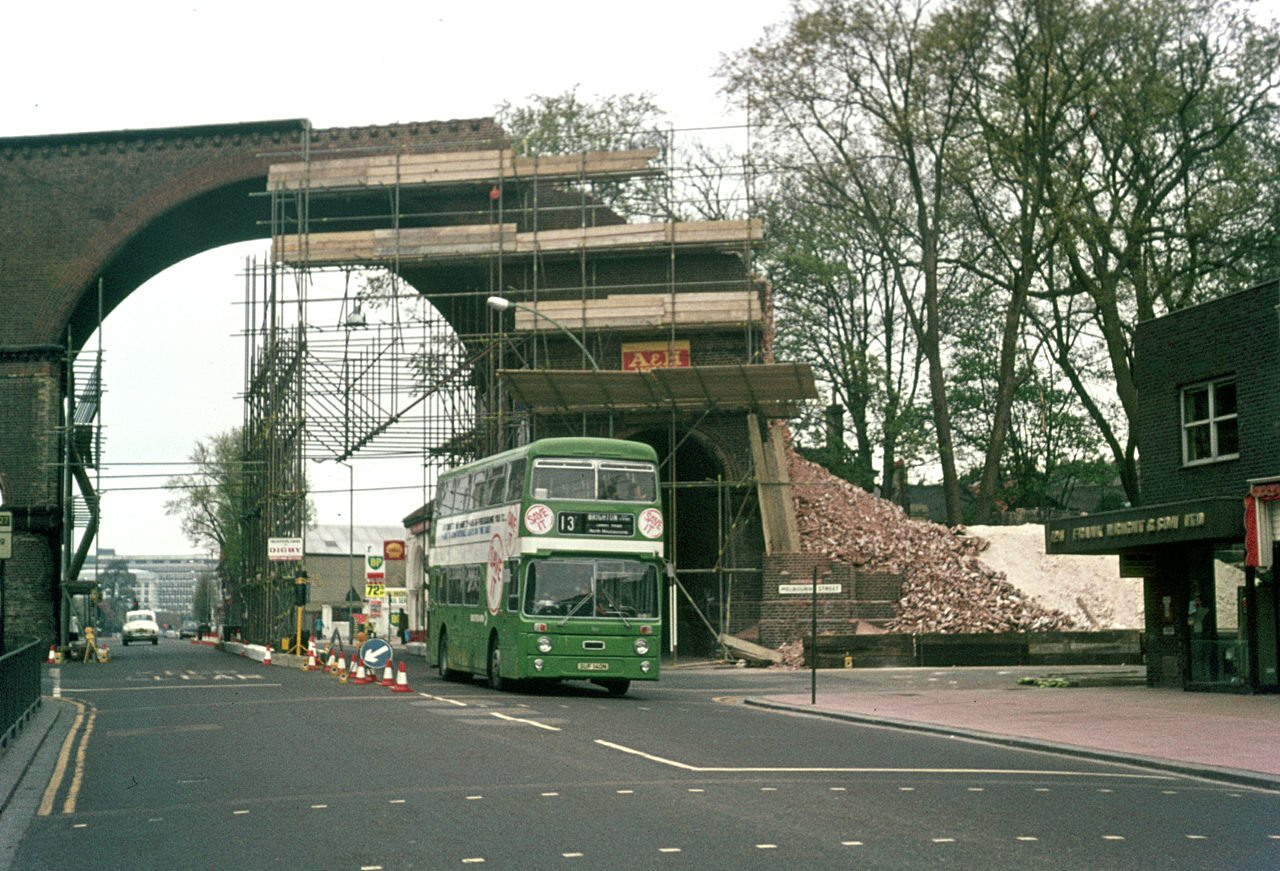
Demolition of Lewes Road viaduct, 1976

The signal boxes at Kemp Town and Lewes Road were decommissioned and "one engine in steam" working was instituted on the line for the one or two daily goods trains; this arrangement started on 29 July 1933. There was an occasional Sunday School special excursion on the line after passenger closure.

During the Second World War the tunnel on the branch was used for overnight storage of main-line electric multiple unit trains, as a protection during air raids; the branch was not electrified and the trains were positioned by steam engines. This practice was adopted between October 1941 and May 1944, except that it was suspended during the period that London Road viaduct was unusable following air raid damage, during May and June 1943. A bomb badly damaged the track on the Brighton side of the tunnel in the early hours of 22 October 1943, and the trains in the tunnel were marooned there until the track was restored later that day.

The railways of Great Britain were taken into public ownership on 1 January 1948, under the control of British Railways. The branch continued in use for goods purposes, and British Railways found it convenient to use Kemp Town goods station as a relief to the congested main goods depot of Brighton. However the line finally closed on 26 June 1971. A special gala passenger service was operated on the last day, with hourly trains provided by British Rail Class 206 diesel-electric multiple unit 1205.

== Accidents and incidents ==
On 9 July 1902 the 7:30 pm train from Brighton to Kemp Town failed to stop properly at the terminus and collided at slow speed with the buffer stops. There were eleven passenger vehicles in the train, three of them six-wheelers and the rest four-wheelers. Seventeen passengers sustained minor injuries. The driver claimed that the train load was heavier than normal, but the Inspecting Officer, Col von Donop, found that he failed to take that into account and the fault was entirely his. The line falls by a slight gradient (1 in 213) to the terminus; the Westinghouse brake was working throughout the train. There was a rule that on entering terminal stations the automatic brake was not to be used except in emergency, but only the engine hand brake was to be used in normal circumstances. (The driver did use the Westinghouse brake when he realised he could not stop safely.) There was heavy rain at the time and the wheels may have been sliding.

British Railways E4 Class locomotive No. 32468 was in collision with the buffers at an unknown date.

== Land use since closure ==
The site of Kemp Town station has been redeveloped as the Freshfield Industrial Estate. The portal of the railway tunnel leading through to the site of Hartington Road Halt (now a block of flats), may be viewed from the compound of a self-storage warehouse and van rental company. Hartington Road Viaduct was demolished in 1973, and Lewes Road Viaduct followed in 1976. The supermarket building located where Lewes Road Viaduct approached Lewes Road Station incorporates tall arches of dark brick in its outer façade, recalling the viaduct. A gap in the Victorian houses of D'Aubigny Road, uphill from the supermarket, indicates where the station once stood.

Part of the line was converted into William Clarke Park.

== See also ==
- Transport in Brighton and Hove
