= Trolleybuses in Brighton =

Brighton trolleybus system

Brighton trolleybus system
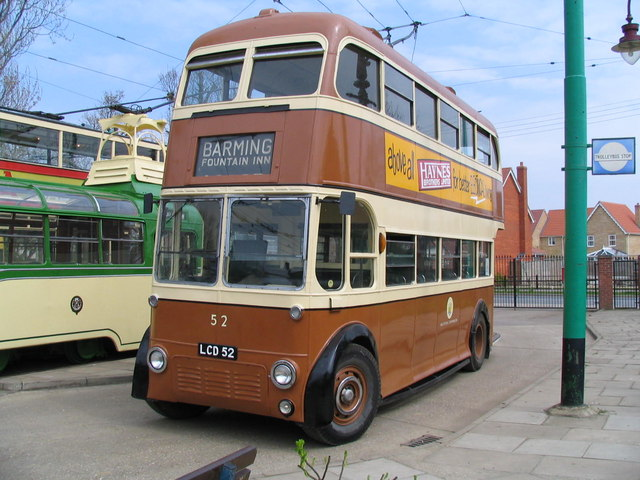
- Brighton trolleybus no 52, now at the East Anglia Transport Museum, carrying Maidstone system livery

Operation
- Locale: Brighton, East Sussex, England
- Open: 1 May 1939; 87 years ago
- Close: 30 June 1961; 65 years ago
- Status: Closed
- Routes: 9
- Operators: Brighton Corporation Transport (1939–1961); Brighton, Hove & District Omnibus Co. Ltd. (1945–1961)

Infrastructure
- Electrification: (?) V DC parallel overhead lines
- Stock: 52 (maximum) (BCT); 11 (B,H&D)

The Brighton trolleybus system formerly served the town of Brighton, East Sussex, England. Opened on 1 May 1939, it gradually replaced the Brighton Corporation Tramways network.

By the standards of the various now defunct trolleybus systems in the United Kingdom, the Brighton system was a moderately sized one, with a total of nine routes. It was also unusual in that it had two operators.

== History ==
Brighton has a long history of electric-powered public transport. The first system in the town was the Volk's Electric Railway which began running along the sea front in 1883. Volk built a second system, the Brighton and Rottingdean Seashore Electric Railway, which had a track gauge of 18 feet (5.5 m), and ran along the shore and through the sea from the Electric Railway to Rottingdean. It began operating in 1896, but was demolished in 1900 despite its success to make way for improved sea defences. A conventional electric tramway system was introduced in 1901, and ran until 1939.

Both Brighton Corporation and nearby Hove Corporation were keen to trial the relatively new trolleybus systems developed prior to the First World War, and to convince residents of their advantages. Brighton erected 690 yards (630 m) of overhead wiring along The Level, and obtained the world's first double-deck trolleybus from Railless Company in late 1913. It had 40 seats and was delivered by railway in 1913, having been tested on the Leeds route to New Farley. It was used for demonstration trips, some of which ran further than the wiring, by using the single wires of the tramway system and a skate that ran along the tram rails to provide the return feed. Hove built around 440 yards (400 m) of overhead wiring, running from the Town Hall to Hove railway station, which used the Austrian Cedes wiring system. A 33-seat double-deck trolleybus was built by Dodson in late 1914, and again trials were carried out, but neither experiment resulted in trolleybus systems being installed, and the wiring was later dismantled. Hove's trolleybus saw further service at Keighley, but the fate of the Brighton vehicle is unknown.

In the 1930s, the corporation looked again at replacing trams with trolleybuses, and sought parliamentary approval to authorise the change. The demonstration wiring along The Level was reinstated in 1935, and they borrowed an AEC vehicle from the Portsmouth system and a forward-entrance vehicle from the London system. These were showcased in the hope that residents would support the proposals. When the 1938 Brighton Corporation (Transport) Act was granted, it included the condition that the corporation should co-ordinate services with Brighton Hove and District Omnibus Company, with a common livery applied to vehicles owned by both organisations.

Public services began on 1 May 1938, when the route from the Aquarium (Old Steine) northwards to Lewes Road opened. The corporation depot was located near the northern end of this route. Several other routes were opened during 1939, all of them using vehicles owned by Brighton Corporation. Their fleet of 44 trolleybuses were to be supplemented by eight purchased by Brighton Hove and District, but they arrived just before the outbreak of the Second World War, and so were stored until hostilities ended. In 1944, Brighton Hove and District realised that if they did not act quickly, the powers that allowed them to run on the corporation routes would lapse, and so their trolleybuses entered service in 1945. Initially, they were stabled in the corporation depot at Lewes Road, as there were no overhead wires to their depot near Black Rock, to the east of the town. The Route 44 service from Black Rock to Seven Dials commenced in March 1946, and was the only route that did not terminate at Aquarium (Old Steine).

Further expansion of the system took place in 1948 and 1949, to serve a large housing scheme at Hollingbury, to the north of the town centre. In August 1951, the wires were extended southwards from Hollingbury to Preston Drove, creating a circular route to the new housing. The corporation ordered six more vehicles in 1948, and Brighton Hove and District ordered another three. Two further vehicles, which had been in store for some time, entered service for the corporation in 1953. The Brighton Hove and District vehicles generally worked the route from Black Rock to Seven Dials, and some of the circular route to Brighton railway station and Queens Park Road.

The main operator of the system was Brighton Corporation Transport, which owned the wires, and at its peak had a fleet of 52 trolleybuses. The other operator, Brighton Hove and District Omnibus Company, introduced a fleet of eight trolleybuses to the system on 1 January 1945 with three more following later, and ran them on four of the system's routes. The whole system was closed relatively early, on 30 June 1961.

Two of the former Brighton trolleybuses are now preserved. One is at the Science Museum annexe at Swindon, and the other is at the East Anglia Transport Museum, Carlton Colville, Suffolk.

== See also ==
- Transport in Brighton and Hove
- List of trolleybus systems in the United Kingdom
