= William Clarke Park =

Public park in Brighton, England

- The Patch
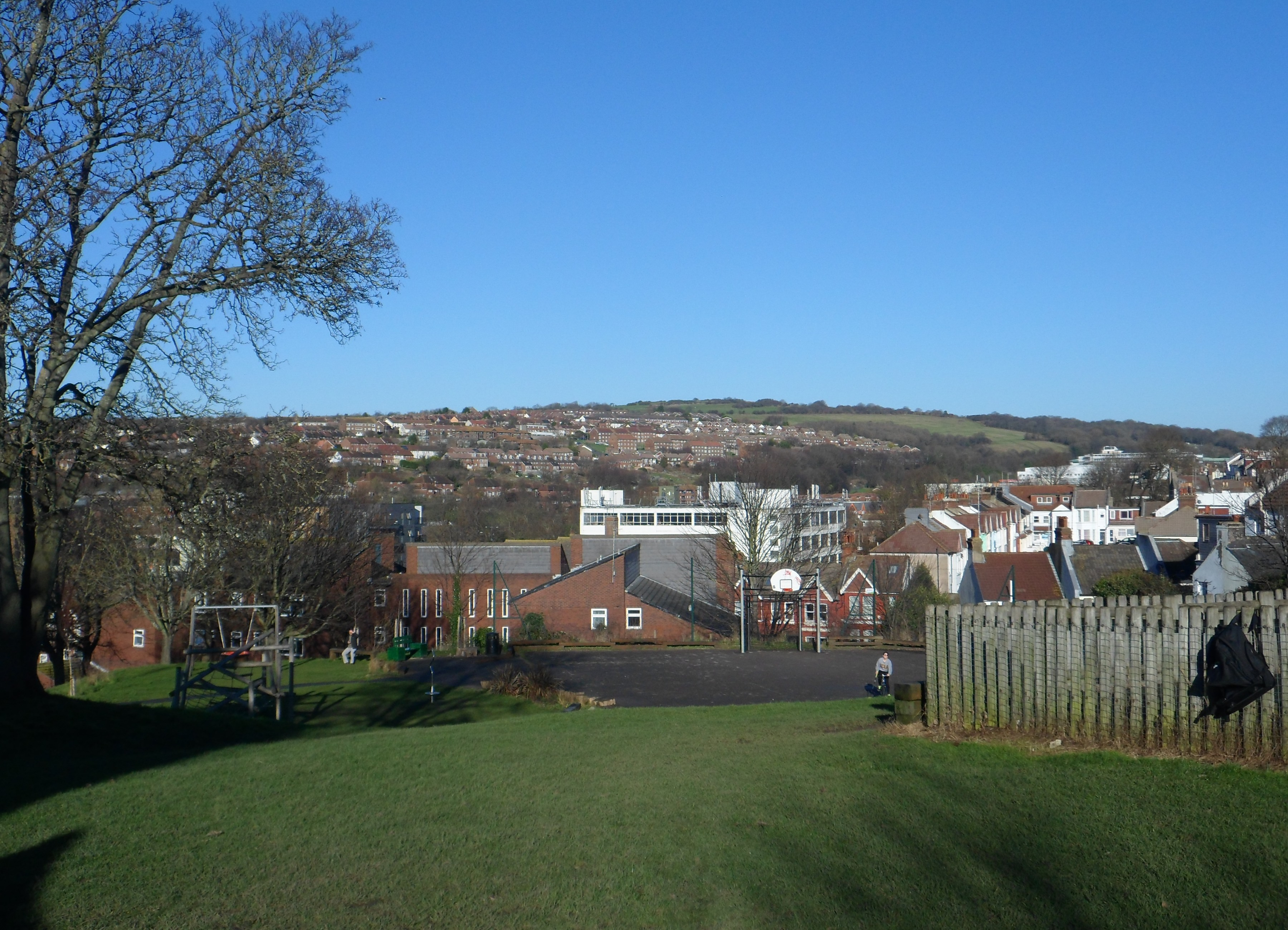
- The park in January 2014
- Interactive map of William Clarke Park
- Type: Public Park
- Location: Brighton, England
- Coordinates: 50.833972°N 0.123508°W
- Area: 1.95 acres (0.79 ha)
- Website: williamclarkepark.org

William Clarke Park, better known as The Patch, is a public park in Brighton, England, which was opened in the late 20th century. The park has a sports area, which contains a basketball hoop and a football goal, a playground and a pond among other things. It can be accessed by paths from Hartington Road, Picton Street and Franklin Street.

== History ==
After the Kemp Town branch line closed in 1971, the former railway cutting—a long and narrow area of land between Hartington Road and Elm Grove—became available for redevelopment. Labour councillor and former Mayor of Brighton William Clarke led a campaign to lay out a recreational area to serve the Elm Grove and Lewes Road areas, which are underprovided with open space. Landfill was used on the cutting to create the park.

The park opened in the 1980s and has been looked after by a community group, the Friends of William Clarke Park, since 1995. It is one of several parks in the city where the council can arrange for people to plant a commemorative tree.

In March 2017, the park had a £53,000 makeover, which forced it to close for a few days. It replaced lots of fencing, resurfaced paths, and improved drainage systems, as well as giving the park better play equipment.

== Patchfest ==
Patchfest is an annual community festival in the park, which is run by volunteers and organised by the Friends of William Clarke group. The festival has live music and many stalls which contain games, food and drink or other things which are being sold. On 8 May 2020, during the COVID-19 pandemic, there was a virtual Patchfest to replace the in person festival, as restrictions at the time did not allow in-person meetings.

== Bibliography ==
- Collis, Rose (2010). The New Encyclopaedia of Brighton. (based on the original by Tim Carder) (1st ed.). Brighton: Brighton & Hove Libraries. ISBN 978-0-9564664-0-2.
