= London Road (Brighton) railway station =

Railway station in Brighton, England

Coordinates: 50°50′12″N 0°08′11″W

London Road (Brighton)
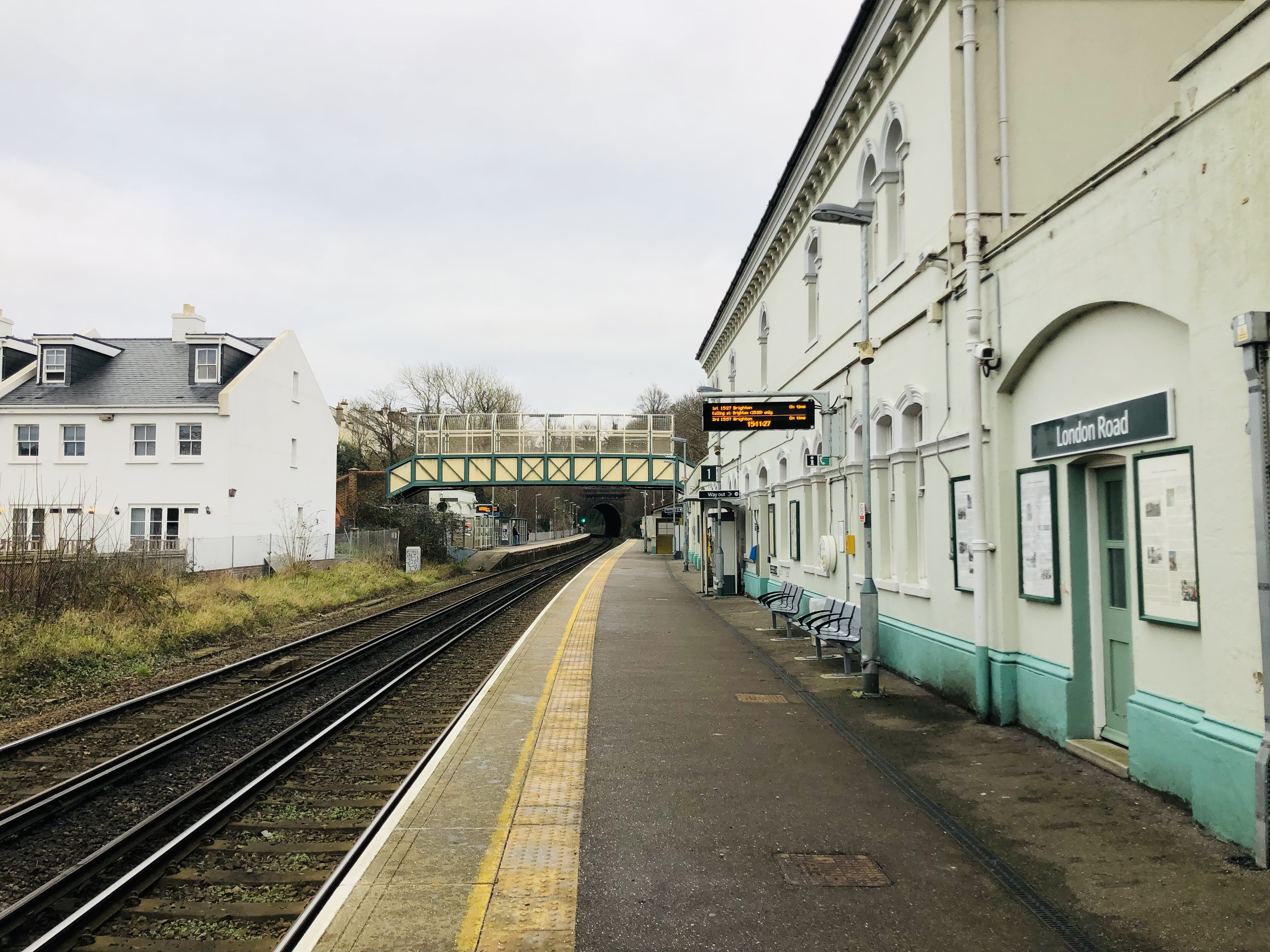
- The platforms at London Road, looking northeast

General information
- Location: Round Hill, Brighton & Hove; England,
- Grid reference: TQ313057
- Managed by: Southern
- Platforms: 2

Other information
- Station code: LRB
- Classification: DfT category E

History
- Opened: 1 October 1877

Passengers
- 2020/21: ▼0.103 million
- 2021/22: ▲0.257 million
- 2022/23: ▲0.286 million
- 2023/24: ▲0.324 million
- 2024/25: ▲0.392 million
Location
Notes
- Passenger statistics from the Office of Rail and Road

London Road (Brighton) railway station is a railway station located in Round Hill, an inner suburb of Brighton in East Sussex, England. It is the first intermediate station on the Brighton branch of the East Coastway Line, 57 chains (1.1 km) down the line from Brighton station. The station is managed by Southern, who operate all services on the line. It is parenthesised London Road (Brighton) to avoid confusion of the station of same name in Guildford. Despite its name, the station is not located on London Road, which passes some 400 yards (370 m) southwest of the station and bears the name Preston Road at the nearest point.

== History ==
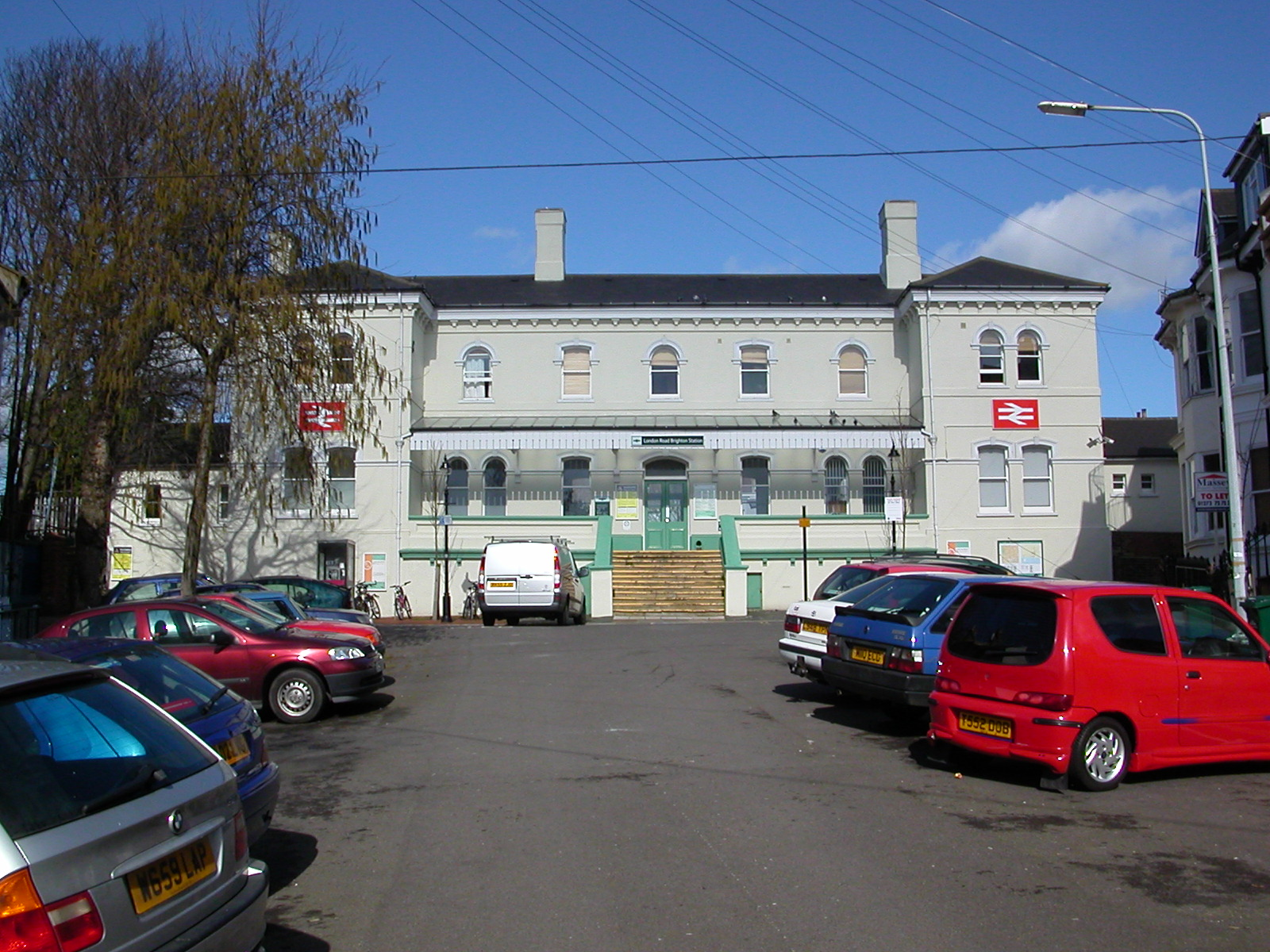
The station building on Ditchling Rise in 2007

London Road (Brighton) station, which opened on 1 October 1877, features a design similar to other stations of the London, Brighton and South Coast Railway built during that period, such as Hove and Portslade, resembling a Tuscan-style villa. It was built following housing development in the surrounding area. It was originally to be called Ditchling Rise, a more accurate name as London Road is 370m southwest. Until the Kemp Town branch line closed in 1971, trains to Kemp Town diverged from the Brighton – Lewes line here.

The building on platform 2 (Lewes bound) was demolished in the early 1980s. The station had a substantial refurbishment at the end of 2004 with some add-on parts to the original building demolished.

The station has been home to the Brighton Model Railway Club since 1971.

== Services ==
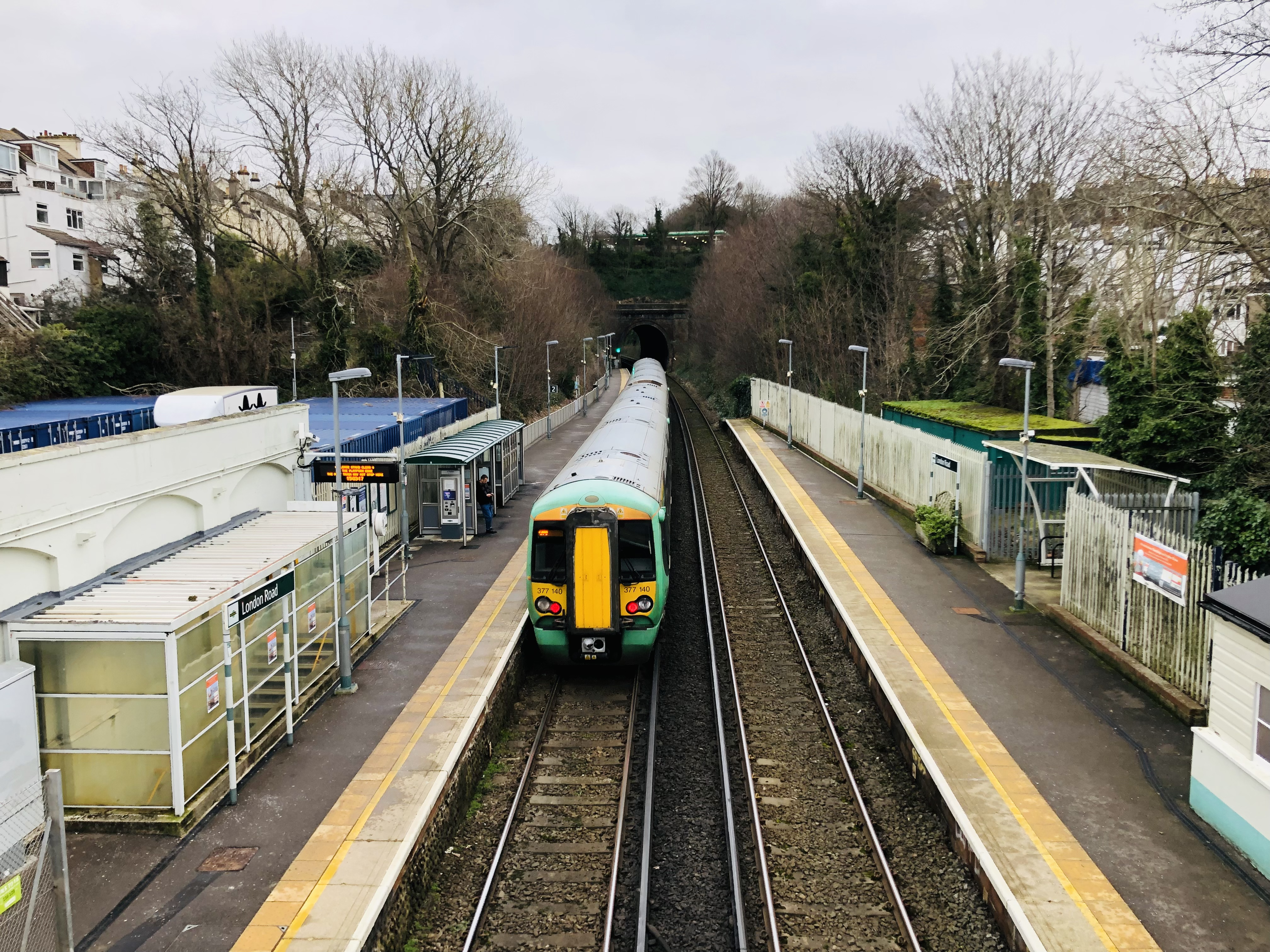
377140 passes nonstop through London Road with a Southern service bound for Ore.

All services at London Road are operated by Southern using Class 377 EMUs.

The typical off-peak service in trains per hour is:

- 3 tph to Brighton
- 2 tph to Seaford
- 1 tph to Eastbourne

During the peak hours, a number of additional services between Brighton, Hastings and Ore also call at the station.

Preceding station	National Rail	Following station
Brighton	Southern East Coastway Line	Moulsecoomb
	Disused railways	
Brighton Line and station open	London, Brighton and South Coast Railway Kemp Town Branch Line	Lewes Road Line and station closed

== See also ==
- Transport in Brighton
- History of Brighton – with reference to the Second World War section describing the bombing of the London Road railway viaduct.
