= Moulsecoomb railway station =

Railway station in East Sussex, England

Coordinates: 50°50′47″N 0°07′08″W

Moulsecoomb
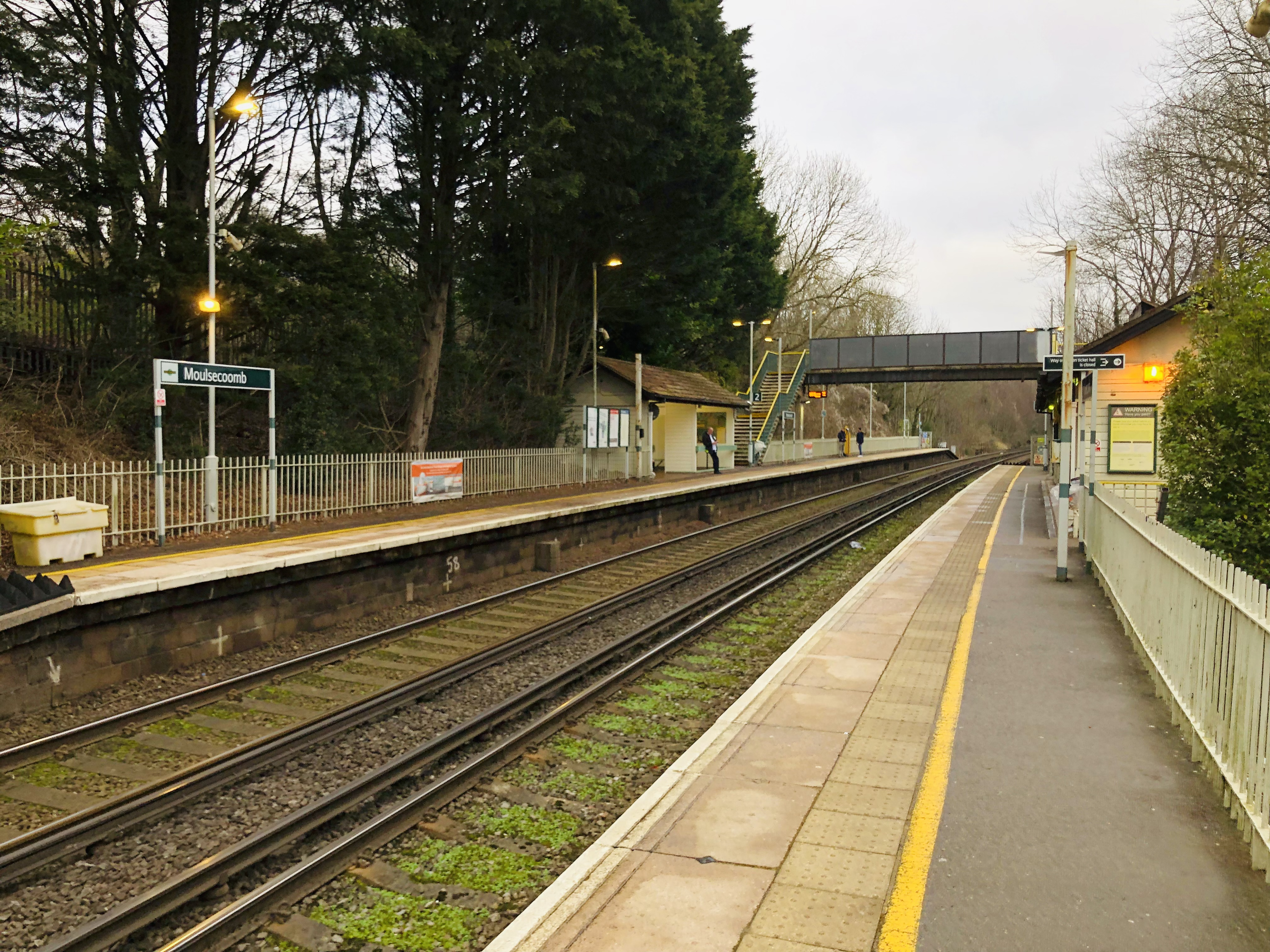
- The platforms at Moulsecoomb, looking northeast

General information
- Location: Moulsecoomb, Brighton and Hove; England
- Grid reference: TQ325069
- Managed by: Southern
- Platforms: 2

Other information
- Station code: MCB
- Classification: DfT category E

History
- Opened: May 1980

Passengers
- 2020/21: ▼0.103 million
- 2021/22: ▲0.292 million
- 2022/23: ▲0.320 million
- 2023/24: ▲0.373 million
- 2024/25: ▲0.445 million
Location
Notes
- Passenger statistics from the Office of Rail and Road

Moulsecoomb railway station serves Moulsecoomb and Hollingdean, both suburbs of Brighton in East Sussex, England. Train services from the station are provided by Southern, and the station is on the East Coastway Line 1 mile 65 chains (2.9 km) down the line from Brighton.

The station was opened in May 1980 — the first completely new station on the then Southern Region since the Beeching Axe. It is located adjacent to the Moulsecoomb campus of the University of Brighton.

The station has separate entrances to each platform; these are connected by a footbridge which also serves as a public right of way. The entrance to Platform 1 (the westbound platform) is via a set of steps from Queensdown School Road, a steeply sloping cul-de-sac off the main Lewes Road. Platform 2 is reached from a path leading from the end of Crespin Way, another cul-de-sac at the eastern edge of the Hollingdean estate.

== Services ==
All services at Moulsecoomb are operated by Southern using Class 377 EMUs.

The typical off-peak service in trains per hour is:

- 3 tph to Brighton
- 2 tph to Seaford
- 1 tph to Eastbourne

During the peak hours, a number of additional services between Brighton, Hastings and Ore also call at the station.

Preceding station	National Rail	Following station
London Road	Southern East Coastway Line	Falmer

== See also ==
- Transport in Brighton
