= Brighton Corporation Tramways =

English electric tramway company

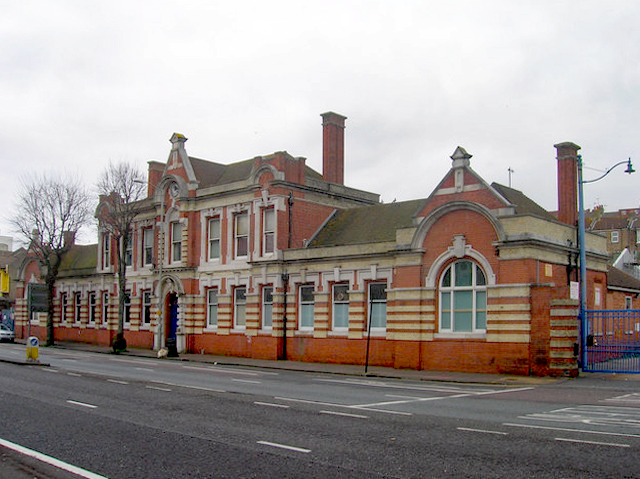
- Former Brighton Corporation Tramways headquarters, Lewes Road

Operation
- Locale: Brighton
- Open: 25 November 1901
- Close: 1 September 1939
- Status: Closed

Infrastructure
- Track gauge: 3 ft 6 in (1,067 mm)
- Propulsion system: Electric

Statistics
- Route length: 9.48 miles (15.26 km)

Brighton Corporation Tramways operated an electric tramway service in Brighton between 1901 and 1939.

== History ==
Brighton Corporation Tramways operated an extensive network of routes in the first four decades of the 20th century. The first route to operate, from 25 November 1901, ran from the main terminus at the Aquarium (outside Brighton Palace Pier) to Lewes Road, a major route to the north-east; other routes were quickly established, so that by 1904 its full extent had been established. The routes were as follows:

Route	Between	And	Frequency	2019 bus route
B	Aquarium	Beaconsfield Road	Every 4 minutes	5
C	Seven Dials	Lower Rock Gardens	Every 5 minutes	—
D	Aquarium	Ditchling Road	Every 4 minutes	26
E	Aquarium	Race Hill	Every 10 minutes	22
L	Aquarium	Lewes Road	Every 4 minutes	25
N	Aquarium	Dyke Road	Every 5 minutes	27
Q	Aquarium	Queen's Park	Every 10 minutes	18
S	Aquarium	Brighton station	Every 5 minutes	7

Routes B and D formed a loop that took approximately 30 minutes to navigate. Route B ran clockwise (via Beaconsfield Road first, then returning via Ditchling Road). A depot serving the whole network was established on Lewes Road, a short distance before the terminus; Brighton & Hove now uses the building as its central Brighton depot.

== Closure ==
Improvements in motor bus and trolleybus technology meant that by the 1930s, the tram system found it difficult to compete, and most of the network was replaced by the Brighton trolleybus system or motor bus routes in 1939. The last tram arrived at Lewes Road depot in the early hours of 1 September 1939 – at about the same time Germany invaded Poland, and ignited the conflict that became World War II.

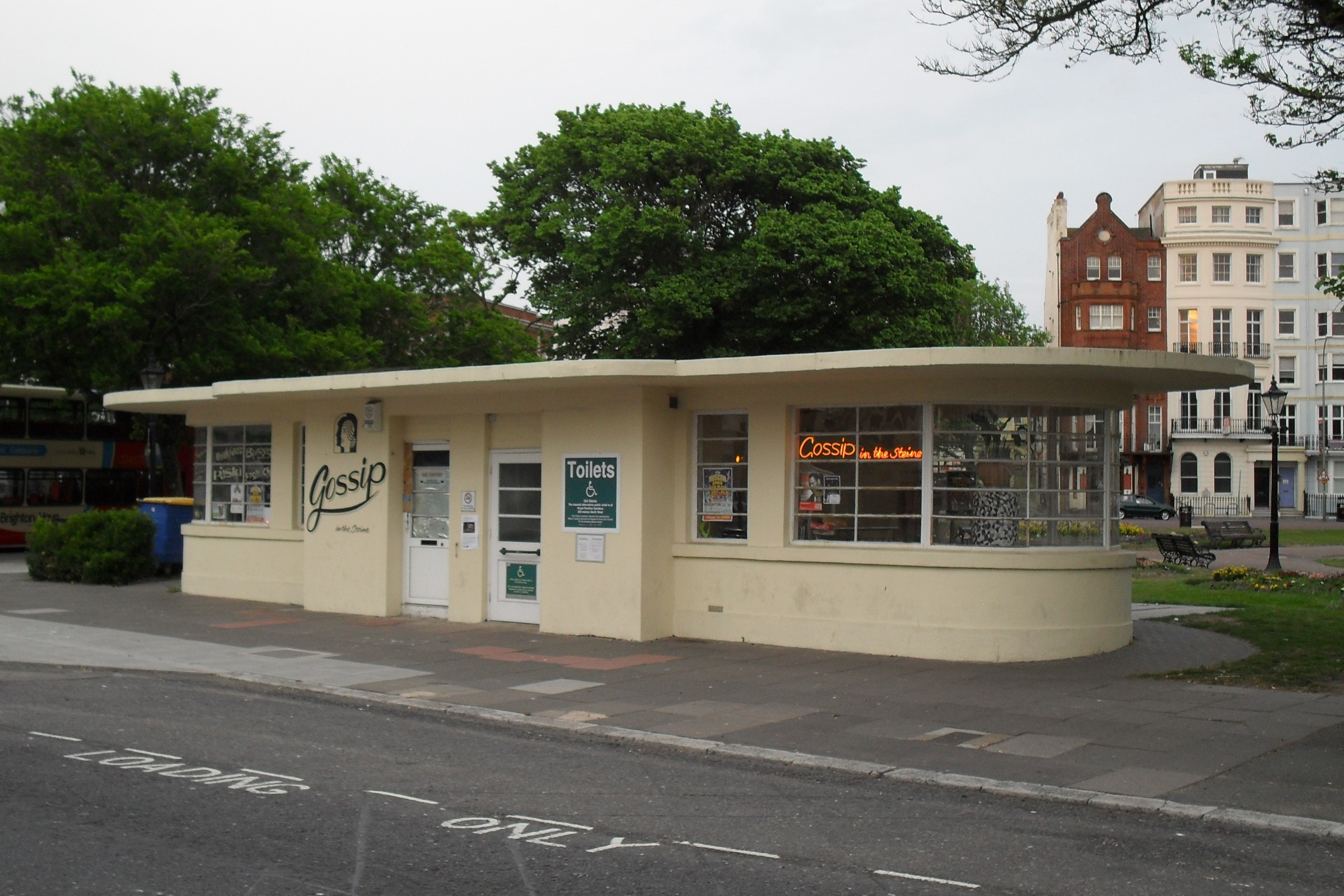
Former tram shelter, Old Steine

Distinctive timber shelters were built at many stops in the early years of the network. Some of these are still standing today at Ditchling Road (Florence Place), Queen's Park Road (Pepperpot), and Dyke Road (reservoir). Another found reuse as the Aquarium Station of the Volk's Electric Railway. One is preserved at the Stanmer Rural Museum, and two at the Chalkpits Museum at Amberley.

The depot was in Lewes Road at TQ 3227 0602, and is now used as the Brighton Buses depot. The windows are still etched with 'Brighton Corporation Tramways'.

== Preserved tramcar ==
Tramcar number 53 survives, and a society has been established for its restoration. The Society is now in possession of Works Car number 1, which will be restored next. There are plans to lay some track in Stanmer Park to allow the tram to be operated as a tourist attraction.

== See also ==
- Transport in Brighton and Hove
