= Babes in the Wood murders (Brighton) =

Murder of two girls near Brighton in 1986

- Karen Hadaway (left) and Nicola Fellows (right)
- Date: 9 October 1986
- Location: Wild Park, Brighton, Sussex, England 50.885°N 0.122°W (approximate)
- Cause: Strangulation
- Motive: Child sexual abuse Rape
- Convicted: Russell Bishop
- Charges: Murder (2 counts)
- Verdict: Acquitted (1987); guilty (2018)
- Sentence: Life imprisonment (2 counts), minimum term of 36 years (2018)

The Babes in the Wood Murders were the murders of two nine-year-old girls, Nicola Fellows and Karen Hadaway, on 9 October 1986 in Wild Park, Moulsecoomb, Brighton, East Sussex, England. The perpetrator, 20-year-old local roofer Russell Bishop, was initially tried and acquitted in 1987. The case remained open until 10 December 2018, when Bishop was found guilty of the murders in a second trial. The investigation into the two girls' murders is the largest and longest-running inquiry ever conducted by Sussex Police.

In April 2024, Sussex Police formally apologised for failings in the original investigation and for the wrongful arrest of Barrie Fellows, Nicola's father, in a connected investigation in 2009.

== Case ==
Nicola Fellows and Karen Hadaway were best friends who lived on the Moulsecoomb council estate in the north of Brighton. Despite living close to each other, the girls attended different schools. At around 3:30 p.m. on 9 October 1986, the two returned home from school before going out to play. At around 5 p.m. Fellows' mother, Susan, saw her daughter and Hadaway playing with rollerskates, the last time she would see her daughter alive.

That same day, 20-year-old Russell Bishop had gone to Fellows' house to speak to a lodger who lived there. Apparently, Fellows had told Bishop to go away and allegedly called his teenage girlfriend, Jennifer Johnson, a "slag".

When seen by a 14-year-old acquaintance near a parade of shops in the Lewes Road area, the girls were told to go home as their parents would become worried. Fellows reportedly told Hadaway, "Come on, let's go over to the park," referring to the Wild Park local nature reserve, where they were not allowed. At around 6:30 p.m., the girls were seen near a police box on Lewes Road, near where Bishop was also seen wearing "what appeared to be a light blue top."

When the girls failed to return home by their bedtime, Hadaway's mother made a 999 call. A search party of around 200 police and neighbours was organised. A helicopter was brought in to help search Wild Park. Bishop joined the search, claiming his terrier, Misty, was a highly trained tracker dog and insured for £17,000. The bodies of the girls were found in Wild Park by two civilian searchers, Kevin Rowland and his friend Matthew Marchant, on the afternoon of 10 October. The girls' bodies were found hidden in a makeshift den in the park, lending the case its name in reference to the children's tale. Both had been strangled and sexually assaulted.

Bishop fell under suspicion due to his close involvement in the search. When the girls' bodies were found, Bishop was close by and ran towards the scene with several police constables, later claiming he had felt the girls' necks for a pulse after finding them dead, most likely to explain any potential exchange of trace evidence. However, one of the constables recalled that Bishop did not get close enough even to see the bodies properly.

Bishop's account of his movements was littered with inconsistencies. He told detectives that on the evening in question, he had gone to Moulsecoomb because he intended to steal a car from the nearby University of Sussex campus. He claimed he had gone to a newsagent to buy a newspaper, but realised he had no money. Bishop also told detectives he had planned to see Johnson that evening but failed to turn up because he bought some cannabis and went home instead. He seemed to tailor his story to fit the evidence. Owing to these inconsistencies, Bishop was arrested on suspicion of murder on 31 October.

== First arrest and trial in 1987 ==
Despite his arrest and notoriety, Bishop was acquitted on both rape and murder charges at his trial in December 1987 at Lewes Crown Court after two hours of deliberation by the jury. Bishop later sold his story as a wrongfully accused person to The News of the World for £15,000.

The acquittal was later attributed to a series of blunders on the part of Sussex Police and the forensic investigation team. The pathologist and forensic scientists failed to record the temperatures of the bodies and therefore could not accurately state the time of death. At the trial, the prosecution suggested the girls were killed between 6:15 p.m. and 6:30 p.m. However, witnesses stated they saw the girls alive at 6:30 p.m. Without scientific evidence to support their timeline of the murders, the prosecution could not challenge Bishop's alibi. Though the girls were fatally strangled, neither the measurements of hand marks around their necks nor the fingerprints left by the perpetrator were taken. Forensic scientists did not analyse the blood discovered on Hadaway's underwear.

A key piece of the prosecution's case rested on the recovery of a blue Pinto brand sweatshirt. The top was found close to the railway line of Moulsecoomb station. Police believed Bishop had discarded the top after attacking and killing the girls and were confident the clothing held a cache of forensic clues. However, they did not properly preserve the evidence, allowing Bishop's defence team to cast doubt on the reliability of the material.

At his trial, Bishop denied that the sweatshirt belonged to him, but Johnson alleged the clothing was Bishop's. The prosecution hoped this would undermine Bishop's credibility and portray him as a liar who was trying to distance himself from a crucial piece of evidence. However, Johnson changed her story under questioning, telling the jury she had never seen the top before. Johnson also gave statements to defence counsel alleging that she had never made her witness statement confirming Bishop's ownership of the sweatshirt and that it had been forged by police.

Bishop was later convicted of a similar attack on a Whitehawk girl in March 1990. He was found guilty of the kidnapping, molestation, and attempted murder of a 7-year-old girl in December 1990 and was sentenced to at least fourteen years before eligibility for release.

== Legislative change and new evidence ==
Double-jeopardy rules in force at the time of the original trial had seemed to eliminate any possibility that Bishop might eventually face a new trial for the murders, but new legislation in 2005 meant that a criminal could face a new trial for a crime if substantial new evidence came to light. In September 2006, the High Court decided that there was not enough evidence for Bishop to face a second trial for the murders.

Eurofins Forensic Services was engaged, the same forensics team that had helped bring the killers of Stephen Lawrence to justice. Eurofins senior scientific adviser Roy Green was asked in August 2012 to re-examine the evidence and recovered a billion-to-one DNA match linking Bishop to the discarded sweatshirt. A taping from Hadaway's left forearm was also found to contain Bishop's DNA.

In May 2016, Bishop was removed from his cell at Frankland Prison in County Durham and taken to the local police station, where he was arrested for the murders of Hadaway and Fellows. In December 2017, the Court of Appeal ordered the quashing of the 1987 acquittals and called for a second jury trial for Bishop. On 2 February 2018, the Press Association reported that Bishop was to stand trial at the Old Bailey, accused of the murders. The trial was scheduled for 15 October 2018. Bishop was charged and pleaded not guilty; on 10 December 2018, he was found guilty of murder.

== 2018 trial ==
Prosecutor Brian Altman QC told the jury the case against Bishop was not just based on his attempt to kill another child similarly, but on "other compelling evidence." He explained, "a significant part of the enquiry had been to re-evaluate various areas of scientific work that were performed for the 1987 trial but through the lens of modern-day techniques, DNA profiling, which, although available in 1986 and 1987, was then in its infancy."

The jury was told that in 2014, samples taken from one of the victims in 1986 had been re-examined in the hope of finding traces of DNA. This produced skin flakes which, when analysed using the most up-to-date profiling techniques, gave a result "that was one billion times more likely if Bishop's DNA was present than if it was absent".

Bishop suggested that Fellows's father, Barrie, was to blame, telling the jury the police spent "32 years building a case against the wrong man". Bishop was not in court every day for his nine-week trial and complained to the judge about feeling suicidal over his temporary stay at Belmarsh, requesting his return to Frankland.

At the 2018 trial, the prosecution put forward a different timeline. Altman presented evidence that the girls were alive at 6:30 p.m. and that Bishop returned to Wild Park. Defence witnesses at the 1987 trial returned as prosecution witnesses in 2018. At this trial, Altman argued the forensic samples taken as "tapings" in 1986 were so carefully handled by the police and preserved by scientists that he could present them as a "time capsule" to prove Bishop's guilt.

On 10 December 2018, after a nine-week trial, a jury of seven men and five women returned a guilty verdict after two-and-a-half hours of deliberation. On 11 December 2018, Bishop received two life sentences with a minimum of 36 years in prison.

== Further criminal action ==
In May 2021, Jennifer Johnson, Bishop's girlfriend at the time of the murders, was found guilty of perjury and perverting the course of justice, having admitted she lied about the sweatshirt in the original trial. She was remanded in custody to await sentencing. On 19 May, Mr Justice Fraser sentenced Johnson to six years in prison, stating that her crimes were "at the most serious end of the scale". Johnson did not attend the sentencing hearing, having refused to do so.

She was imprisoned in HMP Bronzefield, Britain's highest security prison for women.

== Russell Bishop ==
Russell Bishop (9 February 1966 – 20 January 2022) was an English convicted child abductor, child molester, and murderer, sentenced to life imprisonment for the murders of Fellows and Hadaway.

Former friend Geoff Caswell, who used to go fishing with Bishop, described him as a habitual liar. Caswell said, "He was a typical lad around town that time [1980s]. He'd grown a moustache and he had this car he'd race everywhere and he was always telling lies, trying to big himself up. He was only around 5' 5" tall and weighed around eight stone, and I think he suffered from 'little man syndrome'. He was always telling porkies about this and that. He was also a thief. He'd break into cars, and he'd steal stuff. He had been a roofer but was going nowhere really."

Bishop died from cancer on 20 January 2022, at the age of 55. He had been rushed to hospital, from HMP Frankland in County Durham, after his condition deteriorated.

=== Early life ===
Bishop grew up in a family with his parents and his four brothers. His mother, Sylvia—an internationally renowned dog trainer—was described in court as "domineering". After educational problems and dyslexia, Bishop was sent away at age 15 to a special needs school, St Mary's Horam, in Maynard's Green; he was removed from the school at the request of the then Headteacher. He ran away and hitchhiked home to Brighton. At the time of the murders of Nicola Fellows and Karen Hadaway, Bishop, who was 20 years old, was working as a roofer and living in a ground floor flat in the Hollingdean area of Brighton.

=== Criminal history ===
Bishop was fined £200 for burglary in 1984. He also stole car radios and hot-wired vehicles. Bishop also claimed to have been wrongly arrested on suspicion of involvement in the Brighton bombing. In 2018, The Independent reported that 'as even his own 2018 defence barrister admitted, in 1986 Russell Bishop was "a semi-literate, occasional, not very successful car thief … an occasional burglar."

==== 1990 abduction ====
Bishop was convicted of the abduction, molestation, and attempted murder of a 7-year-old girl, Rachael Watts, in the Whitehawk area of Brighton. He committed this crime on 4 February 1990, and was sentenced on 13 December 1990. In 2005, there was a debate over whether he should be classified as mentally ill.

== Alleged links to Margaret Frame case ==
Margaret Frame
- Frame before she died
- Disappeared: 12 October 1978; Stanmer Park, Brighton
- Status: Found deceased on 22 October 1978
- Died: 12 October 1978
- Cause of death: Blunt force trauma, stabbed through the heart
- Body discovered: Forest in Stanmer Park half a mile from her home in Coldean Lane 50.865152°N 0.105142°W

In 1991, criminologists Christopher Berry-Dee and Robin Odell had suggested a link in their book A Question of Evidence between the then still-unsolved Babes in the Wood case and the 1978 murder of Margaret Frame in Brighton. Frame, a 34-year-old woman described as a "young and vivacious mother", was raped and murdered in Stanmer Park less than half a mile from Wild Park. Berry-Dee and Odell noted that Frame's murder also occurred on a "cold October night" and happened almost eight years to the day before the 1986 Wild Park murders. They also observed that the murders had been committed in parks very close to each other in Brighton.

At his 2018 trial, Bishop revealed that his father had been arrested for the Frame murder at the time, but not charged. Admitting this while claiming innocence of the 'Babes in the Wood' killings (before he was convicted), he claimed his father had been 'wrongly arrested'. He said that his father had accordingly told him to not "get involved" in the search for Fellows and Hadaway in 1986.

Frame had been walking her dog through the park after leaving Falmer Comprehensive School where she worked as a cleaner. She walked the route almost every day. On her way to Coldean Lane she was struck by a violent blow from an unidentified attacker in an unprovoked attack, before being stabbed through the heart and raped. The killer later returned to the scene, stripping her naked and dragging her body 500 yards away before burying her face down in a shallow grave and covering the grave with branches. Having disappeared on 12 October she was found ten days later by police searchers. The police long believed the killer was a local man, and the site where she was found was less than half a mile from where the 'Babes in the Wood' were found. It was also only 500 metres (547 yards) away from where Bishop and his father lived on 46 Coldean Lane, the road Frame also lived on and was walking to. Police believed the killer may have watched police searching areas of the park and then moved the body to a spot he thought police had already checked.

Frame's case remains unresolved.

== Timeline ==
- 9 October 1986: The girls go missing.
- 10 October 1986: The girls are found dead in Wild Park, Brighton.
- 31 October 1986: 20-year-old Russell Bishop is first arrested in connection with the murders.
- 3 December 1986: Following his second arrest, Bishop is charged with the murders and remanded in custody to await trial during 1987.
- 10 December 1987: After a four-week trial, Bishop is acquitted of both murders and released.
- 4 February 1990: Russell Bishop arrested and charged with the abduction, indecent assault, and attempted murder of a seven-year-old girl at Devil's Dyke, East Sussex, three days earlier. He was remanded in custody to await trial later in 1990.
- 13 December 1990: Bishop is convicted of kidnapping, indecent assault, and attempted murder. He is sentenced to life with a recommended minimum term of 14 years.
- July 2002: The Babes in the Wood case was subjected to review and DNA profiling, but was not a success.
- April 2005: Double jeopardy laws are changed in Britain, enabling the possibility of Bishop being charged and tried for the murders for a second time.
- January 2006: Forensic tests link Bishop and the Pinto sweatshirt.
- Autumn 2006: Families of both girls are informed that there was insufficient evidence to proceed with a fresh case against Bishop.
- 2011 to 2012: A cold-case review of the murders is conducted.
- 3 November 2013: A full re-investigation of forensics takes place.
- 10 May 2016: Bishop, still imprisoned for the 1990 offence, is re-arrested in connection with the murders after almost 30 years.
- December 2017: Bishop's acquittal is quashed.
- 10 December 2018: Bishop is convicted of the murders.
- 11 December 2018: Bishop is sentenced to life imprisonment with a recommended minimum term of 36 years. Should he live that long, he will have to serve a total of 64 years in prison and live to the age of at least 88 before being considered for parole.
- 17 May 2021: Jennifer Johnson, Bishop's girlfriend at the time of the murders, is found guilty of perjury.
- 19 May 2021: Johnson is sentenced to six years in prison. She begins her sentence at HMP Bronzefield, Britain's highest security prison for women.
- 20 January 2022: Russell Bishop dies of cancer, aged 55, after more than 30 years in prison.

== See also ==
- David Smith – British man acquitted of the murder of a sex worker in 1993, only to be convicted of the murder in 2023
- Michael Weir – British man who was the first person to be convicted of the same crime twice (following an original release on appeal)
- Murders of John Greenwood and Gary Miller – UK unsolved 1980 case which led to calls in 2020 for further 'double jeopardy' reform
- List of solved missing person cases: 1950–1999
