= Wildpark =

Wildpark or Wild Park may refer to:

- Wildparkstadion, a sports arena in Karlsruhe, Germany
- Wildpark-Höfli railway station on the Zürich S-Bahn, Switzerland
- Wild Park, a park in Brighton, England
