= Grade II listed buildings in Brighton and Hove: M =

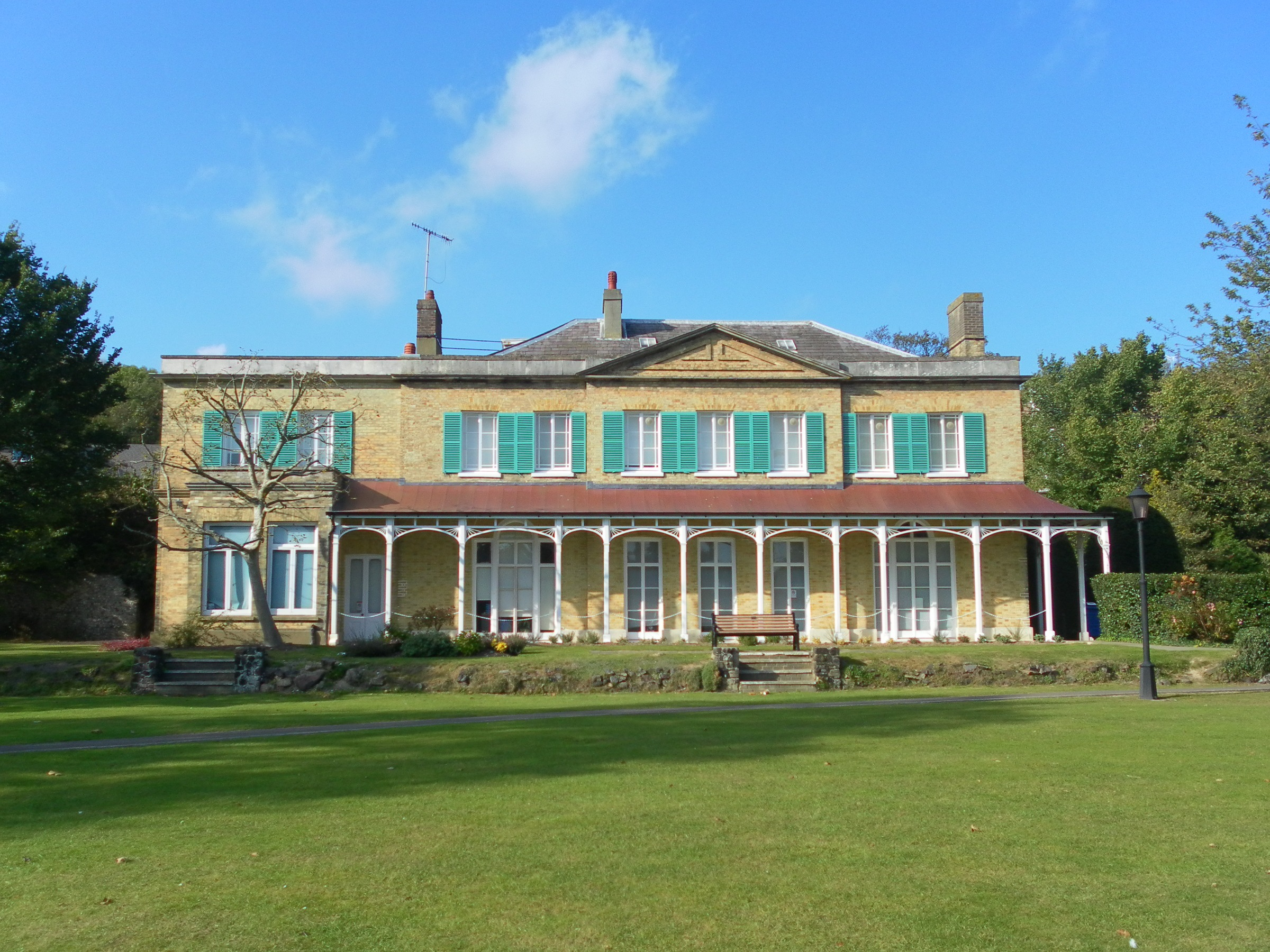
The yellow-brick Moulsecoomb Place (pictured in 2011 after refurbishment) has been owned by the University of Brighton since 1993. It was built in 1790 and extended in 1906.

As of February 2001, there were 1,124 listed buildings with Grade II status in the English city of Brighton and Hove. The total at 2009 was similar. The city, on the English Channel coast approximately 52 miles (84 km) south of London, was formed as a unitary authority in 1997 by the merger of the neighbouring towns of Brighton and Hove. Queen Elizabeth II granted city status in 2000.

In England, a building or structure is defined as "listed" when it is placed on a statutory register of buildings of "special architectural or historic interest" by the Secretary of State for Culture, Media and Sport, a Government department, in accordance with the Planning (Listed Buildings and Conservation Areas) Act 1990. English Heritage, a non-departmental public body, acts as an agency of this department to administer the process and advise the department on relevant issues. There are three grades of listing status. The Grade II designation is the lowest, and is used for "nationally important buildings of special interest". Grade II* is used for "particularly important buildings of more than special interest"; there are 69 such buildings in the city. There are also 24 Grade I listed buildings (defined as being of "exceptional interest" and greater than national importance, and the highest of the three grades) in Brighton and Hove.

This list summarises 130 Grade II-listed buildings and structures whose names begin with M. Numbered buildings with no individual name are listed by the name of the street they stand on. Some listings include contributory fixtures such as surrounding walls or railings in front of the building. These are summarised by notes alongside the building name.

== Listed buildings ==
Contributory fixtures
Note	Listing includes
^{[A]}	Attached railings
^{[B]}	Attached walls
^{[C]}	Attached walls and piers
^{[D]}	Attached walls and railings
^{[E]}	Attached walls, piers and railings
^{[F]}	Attached piers and railings

Building name	Area	Image	Notes	Refs
10 Madeira Place^{[A]}	East Cliff; 50.8204°N 0.1343°W		This Italianate mid-terrace house (now a hotel) was built in the mid-19th century—although the development of this "wide road of attractive lodging-houses" began in the 1780s. Madeira Place was called German Place until 1914. This building has a single canted bay window to each floor, with straight heads and sashes. The window sills are supported on fluted moulded brackets, and small cast-iron balconies project from each bay. The first floor has a more substantial balcony. Large painted quoins on the party walls are broken by three string courses with egg-and-dart and other mouldings.	
18 Madeira Place^{[A]}	East Cliff; 50.8205°N 0.1340°W		This house dates from the early 19th century and is distinguished by a three-storey bow window faced with mathematical tiles. The walls are of painted brick, and the roof has slate tiles. The left-oriented entrance is flanked by pilasters with fluted capitals, in front of which are prostyle columns of the Tuscan order which support a cornice. There is a curved cast iron balcony at first-floor level.	
Malthouse and Brewery (former), Drove Road	Portslade; 50.8438°N 0.2206°W		This structure may survive from Portslade's original early-19th-century brewery—superseded by larger premises in 1880. It is of yellow and red brick with a gable-ended clay mansard roof. Exterior timberwork includes a projecting piece through which barley was channelled into waiting carts. There is irregular fenestration around the building.	
10 Manchester Street	East Cliff; 50.8208°N 0.1355°W		Latterly a café with names such as Golden Girl and Pomegranate, this is late-18th-century and has black glazed mathematical tiles contrasting with brick quoins. Two three-storey bay windows flank the modernised entrance. The parapet has mathematical tiles of a different type and may be 19th-century.	
Manor Lodge	Portslade; 50.8420°N 0.2172°W		This villa of the 1810s was designed with the Picturesque aesthetic in mind. Subsequent alterations include division into several flats. The two-storey double-fronted building has brick walls clad with stucco, some sash windows and a timber-columned covered verandah. Two of the three bays on one façade have bow fronts.	
Margo's Mews	Rottingdean; 50.8052°N 0.0585°W		Margo's Mews consists of three terraced flint cottages, possibly as old as late-18th-century and once known as Bunker's Row. The window distribution on the two-storey buildings is 2–3–2; most windows are set in brick surrounds. Modern dormer windows have been inserted in two of the houses.	
Marine Hotel	East Cliff; 50.8200°N 0.1347°W		At the west end of Marine Parade, "the themes are familiar—bows and balconies chiefly"; but this four-storey house (now converted into a hotel) stands out because of its double-bowed main elevation (each with a three-window range) and five-window symmetrically planned west elevation. Balconies which formerly existed at first-floor level have been removed. The ground floor is rusticated. The west side has some Venetian windows.	
17 Marine Parade^{[A]}	East Cliff; 50.8200°N 0.1344°W		Forming a tall, narrow end to Madeira Place—there is just one window facing the sea and two on the Madeira Place elevation—this four-storey house is bow-fronted and has a prostyle column-flanked entrance to the side. There are cast iron balconies at first-floor level on both façades.	
37 Marine Parade^{[A]}	East Cliff; 50.8196°N 0.1325°W		This 1820s building may have been designed by Amon Wilds and Charles Busby: the three-storey Tuscan pilasters on the narrow five-storey sea-facing elevation are characteristic of their style. The top storey is attic space. The building stands on a corner and has a seven-window side elevation with a straight-headed entrance. The entablature on the front of the building continues part of the way round the side. There is a balcony with iron railings at first-floor level.	
38 Marine Parade^{[A]}	East Cliff; 50.8196°N 0.1323°W		Another early-19th-century end-of-terrace corner house, this four-storey building has a full-height bay window which is segmental in plan to all except the ground floor. The entrance is on the Wentworth Street (side) façade and is topped by an entablature supported on Tuscan pilasters. The first-floor iron balcony has elaborate colonnettes (small medieval-style shafts).	
39 and 40 Marine Parade^{[A]}	East Cliff; 50.8196°N 0.1322°W		These are part of the terrace which includes number 38, and the cast iron balcony is continuous across all three houses; a modern verandah encloses that at number 40. The houses are of stucco-faced brick and were rebuilt in the mid-19th century. Both houses have rusticated ground-floor walls and bay windows.	
41–45 Marine Parade^{[A]}	East Cliff; 50.8194°N 0.1312°W		Also attributed to Amon Wilds and Charles Busby and dating from about 1825, this terrace of sea-facing houses has partly fluted Doric columns and large Tuscan pilasters (of whose capitals only fragmentary evidence remains). Each house has three windows to each of four storeys, first-floor iron balconies (some with iron brackets) and arcades formed by the pilasters and their entablatures. Each column has a prominent entasis.	
46 and 47 Marine Parade^{[A]}	East Cliff; 50.8194°N 0.1310°W		Contemporary with their neighbours, these 19th-century houses (now flats) were later given flat stuccoed fronts. They rise to three storeys and have entrances on their long side elevations. The slate roofs have dormer windows. There are cast iron balconies below the first-floor windows.	
48 Marine Parade^{[A]}	East Cliff; 50.8194°N 0.1308°W		This is an early-19th-century house which was significantly altered in the 1970s. A plaque records that Captain Samuel Brown rn occupied it from 1823; he built the nearby Chain Pier, Brighton's first pier. It occupies a corner plot on Lower Rock Gardens, and is l-shaped with a double front. The arched doorway is flanked by narrow Tuscan columns (colonnettes). A four-bay porch with a trellis encloses the ground floor, forming a colonnade.	
50 and 51 Marine Parade^{[A]}	East Cliff; 50.8193°N 0.1302°W		Amon Wilds and Charles Busby designed this pair of houses in the mid-1820s. Each has three windows to each of four storeys, the uppermost of which is an attic storey. No 50's entrance is in the side elevation and is set in a projecting arched porch, and a cornice runs around above the second floor; number 51 has an entablature at that level. The parapet of number 50 is topped with balusters separated by piers at regular intervals. Both houses have verandahs.	
52 and 53 Marine Parade	East Cliff; 50.8192°N 0.1300°W		Captain Henry Hill, a collector of paintings who specialised in those of Degas, owned number 53 in the late 19th century and altered it to include indoor galleries with Greek elements. This house is also fully bow-fronted, unlike number 52 which is flat apart from single canted bay windows at ground- and first-floor level. Above those are three straight-arched windows at second- and third-floor level. At number 53, the windows are again flat-headed but some are set in architraves. Both houses have thin cast iron balconies; number 52's is topped by a canopy. Squatters caused severe internal damage in the late 20th century.	
54 and 55 Marine Parade^{[A]}	East Cliff; 50.8192°N 0.1298°W		Wilds and Busby were again responsible for these 1820s houses, although number 54 had a curiously projecting single-storey shopfront inserted later in the 19th century. Composite-style two-storey pilasters with foliage capitals separate each set of windows at first- and second-floor level and terminate at an entablature; both houses have a three-window range. Number 54 is fully bow-fronted. Both houses have five storeys; the two above the entablature are attic floors. Number 54 has a prominent parapet and a Doric-columned entrance porch. Like their neighbours, the houses have been damaged by squatters.	
58 Marine Parade^{[A]}	East Cliff; 50.8191°N 0.1293°W		Unlike most buildings on Marine Parade, this early-19th-century house is not solely stucco-clad: there is also brown brickwork. In 1901 it was structurally combined with another listed building, 14 Grafton Street, on the adjacent side street. A canted bay rises through the three main storeys; in the attic storey above this there are three small arched windows set in architraves. There is also an oval window set into the rusticated ground floor. King William IV apparently owned the house when he was still the Duke of Clarence, and a three-storey hall with a gallery survives inside.	
62 Marine Parade^{[A]}	East Cliff; 50.8190°N 0.1289°W		Dating from the mid-19th century, this Italianate four-storey end-of-terrace house was altered in the 20th century, changing the appearance of its long side elevation. This has five windows to each storey, while the sea-facing (Marine Parade) façade has two-all of which are set below entablatures and between Tuscan pilasters, as are some of those on the side. Similar pilasters and an entablature also enclose the entrance, which is set below a fanlight. Another decorative feature is a corbel in the form of a bearded man's head. Some windows have pediments in either triangular or semicircular form.	
63 Marine Parade^{[A]}	East Cliff; 50.8190°N 0.1288°W		This is attached to and contemporary with number 62, but is not identical. The windows are set in a segmental bay which rises through all four storeys. The bottom two storeys have rustication, and there is a timber and iron verandah to the first floor. An elaborate entrance porch has a metope frieze and fluted columns.	
64 Marine Parade^{[A]}	East Cliff; 50.8190°N 0.1287°W		Older than the adjoining houses at numbers 62 and 63, these have been attributed to the Wilds and Busby partnership. There are four storeys (one of which is an attic floor) to the main elevation, each with three windows; to the side and rear the building is one storey lower and has a six-window range. The windows on the main façade are set in a segmental bay which rises to roof level and is flanked by quoins. The elaborate entrance porch is on the side. A bracketed balcony runs across the building at first-floor level.	
68 and 69 Marine Parade^{[A]}	East Cliff; 50.8189°N 0.1283°W		Both of these four-storey terraced houses date from the early 19th century and are bow-fronted . Each has three straight-headed windows to each storey (all with architraves on number 69), a curved parapet and a cast-iron first-floor balcony. That on number 68 has a verandah as well. All second-floor windows have bracketed cornices above them. The entrance porches on both houses are elaborately decorated with Classical-style motifs and structural elements.	
73 and 74 Marine Parade^{[A]}	East Cliff; 50.8187°N 0.1277°W		The Wilds and Busby partnership designed these houses, which are unequal in size, in about 1825. Both are bow-fronted; at number 73, which is shorter, there is a flat-fronted entrance bay with a one-window range and three windows to the bow-fronted section. At number 74, the bow spans the full width of the building and has three windows to each storey, set between giant pilasters which join up below the cornice to give the appearance of an arched arcade. The ground floor of both buildings is rusticated; this continues round the side elevation of number 74, which has a series of blank flat-arched windows.	
75 Marine Parade	East Cliff; 50.8187°N 0.1276°W		This narrow flat-fronted stuccoed house has two windows to each of four storeys, the topmost of which is an attic. A balcony and verandah spans the tall first floor; its railings are described as "Gothic style". There is rustication below this. The entrance, at the side, is set below an architrave and fanlight.	
76 Marine Parade^{[A]}	East Cliff; 50.8187°N 0.1275°W		This "Victorian Italianate" building was used as a club by the Brighton branch of The Royal British Legion during the 20th century. It has been attributed to Charles Barry and dates from the 1840s. There are three windows to each of three storeys; at ground-floor level, they are set in a prominent single-storey canted bay and are flanked by simple pilasters of the Tuscan order. The top of this bay has a parapet with narrow openings. The entrance is to the right. All windows are sashes, and those at first-floor level are slightly recessed beneath arches which give the appearance of an arcade. A balustraded parapet hides the slate roof.	
76a Marine Parade^{[A]}	East Cliff; 50.8186°N 0.1274°W		The façade of this mid-19th-century house protrudes as a large segmental bay, which rises through all five storeys including the attic floor. The ground floor, which is rusticated, has an elaborate entrance porch inserted below the right-hand range of windows. This has prostyle Tuscan pilasters and an entablature with decorative foliage mouldings. There are individual bracketed balconies to each of the three first-floor windows, all of which are topped with bracketed cornices and entablatures with decorated friezes. The cornice separating the third floor from the attic storey is also elaborately decorated.	
77 Marine Parade^{[A]}	East Cliff; 50.8186°N 0.1273°W		A flat-fronted mid-terrace house dating from early in the 19th century, this three-storey building is distinguished by a "delicate Victorian cast iron colonnade spanning the three-bay façade. Thin fluted columns of the Composite order support the balcony above; the arches of the colonnade are formed by filigree-style metalwork, and the supporting brackets are the same. There are arched windows below this, while the first- and second-floor windows are straight-headed. A balustered parapet sits in front of the slate roof, in which there are three dormer windows.	
78 Marine Parade	East Cliff; 50.8186°N 0.1272°W		Partly bow-fronted, this end-of-terrace house is an Amon Wilds and Charles Busby composition from the mid-1820s. A curving Regency-style timber verandah with a tented metal roof spans the first floor of the four-storey building. The wider bow-fronted section has one window to each storey and is to the left; it has a dormer window in its gambrel roof, which does not continue across to the flat-fronted bay on the right. This also has a single-window range.	
79 Marine Parade^{[A]}	East Cliff; 50.8186°N 0.1269°W		Described as "obviously different" from its neighbours because of its roof and its smaller, squat appearance, this could be either late-18th-century or early-19th-century. Sir Terence Rattigan lived in the house and is commemorated by a plaque. The three-storey building is topped by a tiled gambrel roof. A right-oriented entrance porch projects a long way, creating space for a large first-floor balcony which has cast iron railings. Very small balconies are placed in front of the other two first-floor windows. There is another entrance at the side.	
80–83 Marine Parade^{[A]}	East Cliff; 50.8186°N 0.1268°W		These four bow-fronted houses by Wilds and Busby have been called "somewhat ungainly" and are divided between their second and third storeys by a thick horizontal storey band, similar to an entablature. There are five storeys including the attic floor, which has a parapet. Below the storey band, the façades are rusticated; above it, fluted pilasters with foliage capitals and linked by recessed arches rise to fourth-floor level, forming a tall arcade. Each house has a Doric-columned entrance porch. Each house has a three-window range and a full-height bow.	
84–89 Marine Parade^{[E]}	East Cliff; 50.8185°N 0.1263°W		These are several decades later than their neighbours at numbers 80–83 Marine Parade to the west and the houses of Royal Crescent to the east, which number 89 adjoins. Rising to five storeys including an attic, their façades are canted bays with three windows each. The first floor has a continuous verandah with a cast-iron balcony and brackets, timber supports and a metal roof. Deep arched entrance porches lead to doors with arched fanlights; some houses also have Tuscan pilasters around the doorframes. On the top three floors, the windows are set in architraves; those at second-floor level have semicircular pediments as well.	
102–104 Marine Parade	East Cliff; 50.8182°N 0.1242°W		This "quite grand composition", standing well back from the road, dates from the 1820s and may be a Wilds and Busby collaboration. Each of the three houses is fully bow-fronted with rustication at ground-floor level and three-storey fluted Ionic pilasters above. The entablature and cornice have distinctive decorative moulding. Across the first floor is an enclosed porch with Tuscan columns of cast iron and decorative railings. The roof of the porch is enclosed with cast iron railings to form a second-floor balcony. Sir Herbert Carden, an Alderman of Brighton, lived at number 103.	
111 and 112 Marine Parade^{[A]}	East Cliff; 50.8181°N 0.1235°W		Both houses have four storeys and slate roofs; a dormer window has been inserted at number 112. Each storey has a three-window range: arched at first-floor level, straight-headed with architraves elsewhere. The first-floor windows are hidden behind a single-storey enclosed porch which is held up on Doric columns forming a full-width colonnade. There is rustication to the ground floor. The accommodation has been turned into flats.	
113 and 114 Marine Parade^{[A]}	East Cliff; 50.8181°N 0.1233°W		Attributed to the Amon Wilds and Charles Busby partnership and dated to the mid-1820s, these form the end of the terrace started by number 110. Number 114 has a five-window range to the east side, in which the Doric-columned entrance porch is set; both houses have three windows on their sea-facing fronts. Above the third floor, number 113 has a parapet with a curved balustrade, while number 114 has a high, plain parapet. Very slim cast iron columns rise from the ground to the first floor, where they support a small continuous balcony	
115 and 116 Marine Parade^{[A]}	East Cliff; 50.8181°N 0.1230°W		Along with numbers 117, 118 and 119, these terraced houses (attributed to Wilds and Busby) were incorporated into a former hotel, but are now separate again. In design they are very similar to the pair of houses at numbers 113 and 114 Marine Parade: for example, both houses are bow-fronted with a three-windows range, number 115 has a side porch with Doric columns and a keyed frieze, the parapet has a panelled balustrade, and there is rustication to the ground floor. One of the west-side windows at number 115 is canted.	
117 Marine Parade^{[A]}	East Cliff; 50.8181°N 0.1229°W		The mid-19th-century façade of this mid-terrace house hides a slightly earlier building. There are four storeys and a tall balustraded parapet; each floor has five windows, the centremost three of which are set in a narrow full-height bow front. Between the parapet and the third-floor windows runs a continuous modillion cornice and an entablature. A bracketed balcony spans the first floor.	
118 and 119 Marine Parade^{[A]}	East Cliff; 50.8180°N 0.1227°W		These form the east end of the five-house terrace which was once Clarges Hotel. Owned by local actress Dora Bryan and seen as a location in films such as Carry On Girls, it was sold for conversion back into houses in the 1980s. The three-storey bow-fronted buildings also have an attic storey, date from the 1820s and have been attributed to Amon Wilds and Charles Busby. There are four straight-headed windows to each storey; those at first-floor level are obscured by an enclosed metal-roofed verandah held up on a colonnade of Doric columns. Modern dormer windows have been inserted in the attic storey.	
124–126 Marine Parade	East Cliff; 50.8179°N 0.1223°W		These were originally numbered within the sequence of Marine Square immediately to the east, and date from about 1827. The four-storey buildings (three floors plus attic space) have been attributed to Wilds and Busby, and are bow-fronted with two windows to each storey. A bracketed verandah runs right across the façade. Each house has a prostyle porch with Doric columns and entablature; that at number 126 is set in the side wall (facing Marine Square), which has four windows to each storey (some of which are blind) and a two-storey dome-topped bay window in the third of these.	
127 Marine Parade^{[A]}	East Cliff; 50.8178°N 0.1216°W		There are three main storeys and two attic storeys in this tall, narrow building, which has been converted into flats and which stands at the southeast corner of Marine Square. Like several buildings nearby, it dates from the 1820s and may have been designed by Amon Wilds and Charles Busby. The three-window main (Marine Parade) façade is bow-fronted to all five storeys and has two-storey pilasters. Similar pilasters divide the windows on the Marine Square-fronting elevation, which has a five-window range. Simpler pilasters separate the windows on the attic storeys, at the top of which is a balustraded parapet. Most windows are set in architraves. The entrance is on the side elevation and is set in a Tuscan-pilastered porch.	
128–133a Marine Parade^{[A]}	East Cliff; 50.8177°N 0.1214°W		These were built in about 1826, probably to a Wilds and Busby design, as a "picturesque grouping" of flats called Portland Terrace. They are uneven in height and scale, and have different decorative elements. Numbers 128 to 131 have five storeys including two attic floors; the others have four storeys with dormers to the single attic storey, partly hidden behind a balustraded parapet. Each unit has three windows flanked by large two-storey fluted Composite pilasters which rise from the cast-iron balcony and terminate in prominent capitals. Above this pilastrade is an entablature and cornice separating the main parts of the buildings from their attic storeys.	
134–136 Marine Parade^{[E]}	East Cliff; 50.8178°N 0.1205°W		Built as terraced houses but altered (possibly in the late 19th century) to make flats, these are flat-fronted three-storey buildings with two additional attic floors above, three windows on each floor flanked by flat pilasters, rusticated ground floors and a continuous balcony supported on thin columns. The slate roofs are hidden behind balustraded parapets. Number 135, the centre house, is slightly recessed. The flat pilasters are repeated at the attic level.	
137–139 Marine Parade^{[A]}	East Cliff; 50.8174°N 0.1203°W		These three identical houses of the mid-1820s, attributed to Wilds and Busby, have five storeys including an attic; extra attic space was added in the 20th century at number 139, which has a dormer window. The two stages are separated by a cornice. Each house is fully bow-fronted and has three windows to each storey; those at ground-floor level have lintels in the form of keystones. The Tuscan-columned round-arched porches are paired at numbers 137 and 138. Many original sash windows survive.	
140 Marine Parade^{[A]}	East Cliff; 50.8175°N 0.1201°W		This house is attached to the adjacent terrace but set a long way back, and it is smaller: three storeys high with an attic floor above. The building has a shallow bow front and three windows to each storey. A tetrastyle portico of Tuscan columns spans the ground floor; on top of it is a first-floor verandah with thin railings and a cyma recta moulded roof. Above the cornice is a plain parapet with piers at each end.	
141 Marine Parade^{[E]}	East Cliff; 50.8174°N 0.1198°W		Originally a single house called Bristol Court, this has been converted internally into a block of flats and heightened by one storey above the parapet. It has been attributed to Amon Wilds and Charles Busby and dates from the mid-1820s. The building is bow-fronted across nearly its full width and up to the parapet; three windows are set into this façade at each storey. There is a Doric-columned porch on the rusticated ground floor and a cast-iron balcony above, with a metal canopy forming a verandah. Some windows have architraves or corbelled cornices.	
155–157 Marine Parade^{[D]}	East Cliff; 50.8168°N 0.1179°W		Architecturally these are a single composition, but they have always been three separate houses. More Italianate than Regency in style—reflecting their 1850s date—they still have much in common with other Marine Parade houses, such as stuccoed walls and extensive use of rustication. Numbers 155 and 157 are recessed and have two bays each; number 156 has a three-bay façade.	
159–161 Marine Parade^{[A]}	East Cliff; 50.8168°N 0.1175°W		These flank the east side of Belgrave Place and are early 19th-century. Each house has three storeys with an attic above, but these are of unequal heights. Each is topped by a parapet. There are two windows to each storey, and the ground floor is marked off by a cornice below which is rustication. Above are cast iron balconies. Some original sash windows survive.	
162 Marine Parade	East Cliff; 50.8167°N 0.1173°W		Approximately contemporary with nearby buildings on Marine Parade, this mid-terrace house has three storeys with an attic above. There are two windows to each storey. At ground-floor level, the entrance is right-aligned and surrounded by rustication, which is brought forward to form Tuscan-style pilasters on each side. Each window has an architrave with a keystone.	
163–165 Marine Parade^{[A]}	East Cliff; 50.8167°N 0.1171°W		Built in the 1840s as houses, these are now flats but retain much of their original appearance. There are three storeys with an attic and dormer windows above. Number 164 projects forward and has three bays with a pediment above; the others have two. A continuous cast iron balcony runs across the façade at first-floor level. Number 165 has a long side elevation facing east towards Marine Square.	
4–28 Marine Square^{[A]}	East Cliff; 50.8181°N 0.1214°W		This three-sided sea-facing square was erected in 1823–25 to the design of Amon Wilds and Charles Busby. Thomas Attree, the so-called "King of Brighton" who laid out Queen's Park and held numerous civic positions, financed it. The houses were originally yellow-brick; most have been faced with stucco, but some retain their original appearance. Cardinal John Henry Newman lived at number 11 for a time.	
Market Inn	The Lanes; 50.8217°N 0.1393°W		Two houses built in the early 19th century were converted for commercial use in the 20th century: they became a hotel and then a pub. The building, now altered to form a single structure, has four storeys and two sash windows. The walls are of brick, partly painted, and (on the visible side wall) cement. Glazed tiles form a string-course above the ground floor.	
3 and 4 Market Street	The Lanes; 50.8217°N 0.1394°W		This is now in commercial use and has a painted façade with a shopfront inserted at ground level, but in the 18th century it was a house with mathematical tiles on the front wall. There are three original sash windows to the upper storey and two centrally placed entrances below. The partly hipped tiled roof has a single chimney.	
11 Market Street	The Lanes; 50.8215°N 0.1398°W		Originally a house and dating from no later than the early 19th century, this has been converted into shop units. The façade, which may have had mathematical tiles originally, is of stuccoed brick, and the side walls are laid with flints in a random pattern with some brickwork. A brick chimney rises from the right-hand gable end, alongside the tiled roof. The entrance has an arch, Tuscan columns and pilasters, an entablature and a pediment. There are three windows on the upper storey with a dormer above.	
23 Market Street	The Lanes; 50.8211°N 0.1401°W		Alterations in 1992 removed some of the original features of this shop and residential building: sash windows in the rear wall, dormer windows and a canted bay window on the front elevation. Mathematical tiles were also moved from the rear wall to the façade. The three-storey building has a slate roof and straight-arched windows.	
24 Market Street	The Lanes; 50.8210°N 0.1401°W		This large four-storey building faces Market Street, with a three-window façade, and Bartholomews (five windows to each floor). It curves round the corner, with another window in this section and the entrance below in an arched and gabled recess with scrollwork. There is another entrance on the Bartholomews side, in an arch with decorated spandrels. Most windows are either original sashes or blank. The building houses a restaurant and offices.	
47 Market Street	The Lanes; 50.8216°N 0.1400°W		A High Victorian Gothic brick-built structure occupying an important corner plot in the Lanes, this dates from the second half of the 19th century. The brickwork is alternately red and blue, and there is some stone (or artificial stone) work. Most windows and one of the entrances are set in segmental arches; the main entrance has a pointed arch. A small buttress adjoins the neighbouring building at number 48.	
48 and 48a Market Street	The Lanes; 50.8216°N 0.1399°W		Another corner building, but much older than its neighbour at number 47—it is 18th-century—this was originally residential but now has shop units. One façade has three storeys with one window each, and the other rises to two storeys with a single-window range. The windows are mostly casements set under straight arches.	
20–22 Marlborough Place	Brighton; 50.8250°N 0.1369°W		John Leopold Denman designed this "well-mannered ... individual" Neo-Georgian building in 1933 for the Citizens' Permanent Building Society. The present owners are Allied Irish Bank. There are three storeys with five windows at first- and second-floor level and three more at ground-floor level. These are set in arch-topped projections in whose voussoirs are carved reliefs representing builders, masons and other tradesmen. These were designed by Joseph Cribb, and one represents Denman himself.	
26 Marlborough Place^{[B]}	Brighton; 50.8252°N 0.1368°W		This early 19th-century building has a cobbled façade coated with tar and with brickwork painted a contrasting white. There are three windows at first- and second-floor level, and two flank the entrance which is set between pilasters and below an entablature. The windows are surrounded by painted brickwork. There is a parapet with a stuccoed cornice below.	
31 and 32 Marlborough Place^{[A]}	Brighton; 50.8254°N 0.1368°W		These early 19th-century houses have bow windows set in segmental bays rising through the full four storeys. Number 31 has a stuccoed façade, but number 32's is brick. The entrances are arched and set below fanlights. Dormer windows were added in the attic storey in the 20th century.	
33–36 Marlborough Place	Brighton; 50.8255°N 0.1367°W		"Humble and vernacular in character", these low cottages are tucked in at the end of Marlborough Place behind the tall buildings of Gloucester Place. Each is different: from south to north, they are respectively cobble-fronted, red-brick, stuccoed, and of painted brick and stucco. All have a single window to each storey and a dormer above.	
2–8 Medina Terrace^{[E]}	Hove; 50.8247°N 0.1751°W		Work on this terrace started in 1872 or earlier and was finished in 1875. The houses are brick-built but faced with stucco, and have concrete tiled roofs set behind a parapet. Although sea-facing, the south-facing elevation's unobstructed 180° view was partly blocked by flats built in the early 20th century. Number 8 became famous when its one-time resident Kitty O'Shea's lover Charles Stewart Parnell had to escape down a rope-ladder to avoid being caught by O'Shea's husband.	
42 and 43 Medina Villas^{[C]}	Hove; 50.8254°N 0.1740°W		"The most interesting looking building" in the late-19th-century street is this elaborate Dutch gabled semi-detached villa whose Tudorbethan/Jacobethan style is in contrast to the surrounding Italianate architecture. F.D. Bannister, the main architect of Hove's Cliftonville Estate and of the London, Brighton and South Coast Railway, lived at number 42 and probably designed and built the houses, which date from about 1852. There is red and blue brickwork, and the quoins and window surrounds are painted white.	
1–3 Meeting House Lane	The Lanes; 50.8220°N 0.1409°W		As this ancient lane turns and narrows sharply, these wide, very low two-storey cottages (now with shopfronts) appear. Large sash windows on the upper storey reflect "the need to maximise light for craft workshops"—the original function of this 18th-century building, which is now split into three units. The walls are stuccoed and the roof is tiled.	
6–8 Meeting House Lane	The Lanes; 50.8224°N 0.1408°W		These late-18th-century buildings, now with shop units inserted, were enlarged to the rear in the 1980s. This work including blocking up an ancient tunnel leading from number 6, and extending the building line to bring in some old flint walls. All three buildings are of brick. Numbers 6 and 7 have a single-window range each and a shared gambrel roof with dormers, while number 8 has two windows to each storey and a separate roofline. Other original features include dentil cornices and sash windows.	
9–12 Meeting House Lane	The Lanes; 50.8225°N 0.1407°W		These stucco-faced buildings, contemporary with their neighbours and now with shopfronts inserted, rise to three storeys (although number 12 is taller and has a separate hipped roof) and have one window to each floor. Some 19th-century sash windows remain. Number 12 is bay-fronted.	
22–26 Meeting House Lane	The Lanes; 50.8221°N 0.1408°W		Standing on a corner opposite the 17th-century former Union Chapel, this terrace of the early 19th century includes number 22 (pictured), with a "charming bow and decorative railings enclosing a roof terrace". The walls are mostly of stucco, but number 25 (shorter than its neighbours, with only two storeys) has some mathematical tiles which have been painted over. This and number 26 have a two-window range, while the other buildings have just one to each of their three storeys.	
27 and 28 Meeting House Lane	The Lanes; 50.8220°N 0.1407°W		A large, "overscaled" 20th-century shopfront has been inserted across the ground floor of this pair of two-storey houses of the 18th or early 19th century. Modern sash windows have been inserted above. The walls are stuccoed, and the roof is hidden behind a parapet.	
29 and 30 Meeting House Lane	The Lanes; 50.8219°N 0.1408°W		There is weatherboarding to the upper storey of this late-18th-century house, now with modern shop units below. A tiled gambrel roof with dormers and chimney-stacks is another distinguishing feature.	
31 and 31a Meeting House Lane	The Lanes; 50.8218°N 0.1408°W		On a corner site and with south-facing gable ends to its slate-tiled roof, this building is contemporary with its neighbours. The shopfront inserted in the stuccoed walls in the 19th century was modernised later.	
32 Meeting House Lane	The Lanes; 50.8218°N 0.1407°W		Like number 43, which is opposite, this is jettied and has weatherboarded upper walls. Other materials are brick and tile. A modern shopfront has been inserted below the weatherboarded section, and the straight-headed windows are irregularly spaced.	
36–38 Meeting House Lane	The Lanes; 50.8218°N 0.1405°W		Three houses set under a tiled hipped roof, these are now in commercial use and have modern shop units at ground-floor level and replacement windows above. The walls are of stucco, and the building is no later than early-19th-century.	
39 and 40 Meeting House Lane	The Lanes; 50.8217°N 0.1403°W		Now united as a single shop unit, these houses are later than their neighbours: they date from the late 19th century. With just one storey, they are also lower. The walls are faced with stucco.	
41 Meeting House Lane	The Lanes; 50.8216°N 0.1404°W		The flint and brick side wall of this two-storey building, which is 19th-century or earlier, is visible as well as the stucco façade, as it projects beyond the neighbouring buildings. The ground floor has a partly original shopfront, and other features include a straight-headed loading bay.	
43 Meeting House Lane	The Lanes; 50.8217°N 0.1405°W		Little pre-17th-century fabric survives in buildings in central Brighton, but this house (now with a shop at ground-floor level) may be an exception in respect of its prominent jettying. The upper storeys have weatherboarding, and the whole building is timber-framed. Stucco covers the ground-floor walls. One old doorcase survives inside.	
44 Meeting House Lane	The Lanes; 50.8217°N 0.1406°W		Formerly a house but now in commercial use, this brick building may be as old as late 18th-century. A shopfront has been inserted in the lowest of the three storeys; the others each have one window with a brick lintel, and the roof is tiled.	
45–48 Meeting House Lane	The Lanes; 50.8217°N 0.1407°W		This four-building sequence of late-18th- or early-19th-century vintage now forms two pairs, numbers 45–46 and numbers 47–48, as the former has a single shop unit at ground-floor level while numbers 47 and 48 have one each. They were all originally houses. The shop unit at numbers 45–46 is a modern pastiche of an early 19th-century style. Each pair has a three-window range on the upper two floors; some windows are sashes.	
49, 50 and 50a Meeting House Lane	The Lanes; 50.8218°N 0.1409°W		These stucco-clad buildings on a corner site are contemporary with their neighbours and also rise to three storeys. There is one window to each floor on each elevation. Number 49 has an old shopfront at ground-floor level, and number 50 has an "extraordinarily tall" one set between Tuscan pilasters. Many of the windows are 19th-century sashes.	
51–53 Meeting House Lane	The Lanes; 50.8217°N 0.1409°W		As with their neighbours, shopfronts were added to these late-18th-century houses during the 19th century. The stucco buildings have three storeys with a single-window range. A series of Tuscan pilasters runs across the façade. All of the sash windows are original.	
19 Middle Street	The Lanes; 50.8216°N 0.1433°W		The cottage is small in relation to its neighbours, suggesting that it is older than its present early-19th-century appearance. It stands back from the street and has a squat façade faced with stucco and topped by a slate roof. The doorcase is intricate: fluted pilasters support an open pediment on consoles. The right-hand windows project in a two-storey segmental bay.	
20 Middle Street^{[A]}	The Lanes; 50.8217°N 0.1432°W		Cinema pioneer William Friese-Greene undertook his early experiments at this house, and is commemorated by an Eric Gill-designed blue plaque. The tall building has a full-height semicircular bay with two windows at each of the three storeys; to the right is a further one-window range and the projecting entrance porch, which is flanked by Doric columns. The façade is of yellow brick.	
60 Middle Street	The Lanes; 50.8215°N 0.1430°W		This distinctive 18th-century building has a polychromatic façade of whole and knapped flints laid in a chequerboard pattern accompanied by red brick dressings and courses and some stucco. It is double-fronted and has a three-bay façade to Middle Street; there are three segmental-arched windows at first-floor level and one window, a similarly arched entrance and a wide pilaster-flanked opening (originally a shopfront) on the ground floor.	
74–76 Middle Street	The Lanes; 50.8208°N 0.1432°W		These three terraced houses each have full-height (four-storey) bows with a single window each. Four original sash windows survive. A parapet runs across all three buildings. Each house has a right-aligned entrance; that at number 74 is arched, while the others are straight-headed.	
34 and 35 Mighell Street	Carlton Hill; 50.8235°N 0.1320°W		One of the few buildings to survive wholesale slum clearance and urban renewal in this inner suburb east of Brighton city centre, this building (now two houses) was originally Mighell Farmhouse and dates from the early 19th century. It combines the Brighton Vernacular style—brick-dressed cobblestone walls—with Classical elements such as a porch consisting of Tuscan columns supporting an entablature with a pediment and triglyph frieze.	
Mill Cottages	Rottingdean; 50.8053°N 0.0585°W		This pair of cottages have stood at the top of Rottingdean High Street since the early 19th century or before. They have painted flint walls and tiled gabled roofs, straight-headed and arched windows of various styles and ages, and entrances in the south (gable) front.	
1–3 Montpelier Crescent^{[A]}	Montpelier; 50.8290°N 0.1498°W		This is a slightly outward-curving nine-bay composition whose outermost bays (containing the entrances for numbers 1 and 3) are recessed. At first-floor level, a cast iron balcony supported on brackets spans the other seven bays. Each three-storey house has a three-window range; those at first-floor level have architraves of various styles. There are entrance porches flanked by pilasters and topped by an entablature. The ground-floor walls are heavily rusticated.	
4–6 Montpelier Crescent^{[A]}	Montpelier; 50.8290°N 0.1495°W		These have three windows to each of three storeys and have stuccoed, partly rusticated façades which curve outwards slightly. Every window is set in a moulded surround with pedimental architraves and "unusual" wreath-shaped decoration, and the slate-tiled roof (a hipped mansard) is visible behind the low parapet and cornice. The roof also has dormer windows.	
32 and 33 Montpelier Crescent	Montpelier; 50.8302°N 0.1478°W		This pair of stucco-fronted houses are not symmetrical: number 32 has three windows to each storey, but number 33 has four. They are both flat-fronted with no curve, and share a slate mansard roof in which small dormer windows are inset. This spans the central five bays; the outermost bays are set back, have partly vermiculated quoins on their inner sides, and have an entrance (with a fanlight and a segmental arch) at ground-floor level. There are cast iron balconies at ground- and first-floor level; the former runs across the width of the building, whereas each first-floor window has an individual balcony. Some windows have decorative pediments and architraves.	
34–38 Montpelier Crescent	Montpelier; 50.8305°N 0.1477°W		The northern end of the crescent curves outwards and ends (at number 38) in a large projecting bay. At ground-floor level across the whole width of the five-house terrace is heavy rustication. The roof is hidden behind a parapet with a modillion cornice and a fourth (attic) storey with another cornice. Most of the windows have architraves or pediments (either curved or triangular). A continuous cast-iron balcony, supported on brackets and separated at intervals by stuccoed piers, spans the houses at first-floor level.	
Montpelier Hall^{[E]}	Montpelier; 50.8260°N 0.1516°W		This was designed in 1846 by Amon Henry Wilds and is therefore contemporary with some of his other work in the Montpelier area. It is a detached villa of five bays, each with an arched window. Those overlooking the large front garden have original louvred shutters. The exterior, ornately decorated with various mouldings and embellishments, is Italianate.	
Montpelier Inn^{[A]}	Montpelier; 50.8264°N 0.1533°W		Built in about 1830, this consists either of a pair of houses or a house and a smaller pub which then expanded into the neighbouring building. The three-storey stucco- and roughcast-faced structure stands on a corner site in the Montpelier area. The main (Montpelier Place) façade has three full-height segmental-curved bays. The main entrance has pilasters and a cornice with a mutule. Original sash windows survive.	
14 Montpelier Place^{[A]}	Montpelier; 50.8266°N 0.1544°W		This is a tall, narrow three-storey detached house in the same style as the terraced houses of the area. Each of the three floors has a single sash window. The walls are stuccoed with rustication at ground-floor level.	
20–24 Montpelier Place^{[A]}	Montpelier; 50.8265°N 0.1527°W		A terrace of five bay-fronted houses of the mid-1850s, this block faces Temple Street and rises uniformly to three storeys. There are dormer windows in the slate roof, below which is a dentil cornice. All windows are straight-headed; some have original sashes and architraves. The stucco walls are rusticated at ground-floor level.	
14–16 Montpelier Road^{[A]}	Montpelier; 50.8239°N 0.1536°W		This terrace rises to three storeys and has a mansard roof with dormers. Each house has a single sash window to each floor, set in a segmental bay which reaches to the roofline. The buildings date from the mid-1820s.	
19 Montpelier Road^{[A]}	Montpelier; 50.8241°N 0.1535°W		Although four storeys high, this is otherwise similar to the houses at numbers 14–16: built at the same time, it also has a single-window range, a dormer in its tiled roof, a segmental bay rising to the cornice and frieze below the roofline, side chimney-stacks and original sash windows. There is also an iron verandah at first-floor level.	
21 and 22 Montpelier Road	Montpelier; 50.8242°N 0.1535°W		A pair of terraced houses of c. 1825, these were substantially altered in the 20th century with the addition of new entrances, balconies and other structures. The two buildings share a five-window range: each has two sash windows to their full-height bays, and above the shared central entrance (with its "crude" modern porch) are blank windows in the recess between the bays.	
23 and 24 Montpelier Road	Montpelier; 50.8243°N 0.1534°W		Another pair of stucco-faced houses of the mid-1820s, these have three windows to each of their four storeys and an elaborate centrally placed entrance porch with a triglyph frieze and entablature on Doric columns. Most of the windows are set in architraves, and there are original sashes at second-floor level.	
28 and 29 Montpelier Road^{[A]}	Montpelier; 50.8246°N 0.1533°W		.	
36–42 Montpelier Road^{[A]}	Montpelier; 50.8254°N 0.1528°W		.	
48–50 Montpelier Road^{[A]}	Montpelier; 50.8257°N 0.1526°W		.	
51 and 52 Montpelier Road^{[A]}	Montpelier; 50.8259°N 0.1525°W		.	
53–56 Montpelier Road^{[A]}	Montpelier; 50.8260°N 0.1524°W		.	
58–65 Montpelier Road^{[A]}	Montpelier; 50.8265°N 0.1521°W		This four-storey terrace was built in about 1850. Each house has three windows to each floor set into segmental-arched bays which rise to the parapet below the mansard roof, in which dormer windows are set. At ground-floor level on each house there is rustication and a porch consisting of pilasters and a straight entablature with moulded wreaths. Preacher Frederick William Robertson of Holy Trinity Church in Ship Street lived in number 60 and is commemorated by a blue plaque.	
70–74 Montpelier Road^{[A]}	Montpelier; 50.8273°N 0.1511°W		Built in about 1840, these four-storey terraced houses are at the north end of the road: number 70's side elevation faces Victoria Road and has four architraved window openings to each storey (all were originally blind openings, and many still are). Most windows on the main elevation also have architraves and are straight-headed. There is rustication across the ground floor. The floors are separated by string-courses and cornices.	
76–80 Montpelier Road^{[A]}	Montpelier; 50.8271°N 0.1513°W		These are bay-fronted terraced houses of the 1840s, each of stucco with slate roofs in common with the neighbouring buildings. Number 79 has been extended into the attic. The first-floor windows have small and ornate iron balconies and are topped by architraves, as are those on the floor above. String-courses and cornices separate the storeys. Some old sash windows remain.	
90 Montpelier Road^{[C]}	Montpelier; 50.8261°N 0.1519°W		A link-detached double-fronted villa standing on a corner site, this stuccoed and slate-roofed building is early Victorian (1840s) but has a later Victorian glazed porch with ornate ironwork. There are two storeys with four windows to each, and the roof has dormers. Much of the ground floor has rustication in various styles. Other decorative features include stained glass, stucco panels, pilasters and moulded architraves.	
91–96 Montpelier Road^{[B]}	Montpelier; 50.8258°N 0.1521°W		Three pairs of semi-detached villas (each with a five-window range, of which the central one is blind) are linked to form a terrace on the east side of the road. They date from about 1830 and may be by the Wilds and Busby partnership. Each pair has a centrally placed entrance set back to the right, forming the link between adjacent villas. These entrances are flanked by Ionic or Doric columns. There are iron balconies at ground-floor level.	
1–22 Montpelier Street and 1 Victoria Road^{[A]}	Montpelier; 50.8268°N 0.1499°W		The entire west side of Montpelier Street is listed under a single listing, along with a contemporary house facing Victoria Road. Numbers 1–4 have their slate roofs set behind a parapet; the others have dormer windows instead. Some houses have canted bay windows with sashes.	
40 Montpelier Street	Montpelier; 50.8261°N 0.1499°W		This steeply sloping north–south street was built up in the 1840s. Only one house on the east side is listed—a two-storey, three-bay cottage whose leftmost two bays are segmental and reach to the parapet. The windows in these bays are original sashes. The right-hand window at first-floor level is blind. Below the parapet, a cornice runs across the full width of the building.	
1–7 Montpelier Terrace and 89 Montpelier Road^{[D]}	Montpelier; 50.8263°N 0.1515°W		Numbers 1–5 are "a grand three-storey group of c. 1830", while numbers 6 and 7 are about 20 years newer but are similar in style. The stuccoed terrace has continuous rustication at ground-floor level, a first-floor cast iron balcony to each house, and a long cornice with dormer windows breaking through. The treatment of the cornice at numbers 6 and 7 is slightly different, resembling those at Montpelier Villas. Two-storey Ionic pilasters separate each house.	
8–13 Montpelier Terrace^{[A]}	Montpelier; 50.8261°N 0.1506°W		This terrace has some similarities with the houses of Montpelier Villas, with which it is contemporary. In particular, the bracketed cornices are very prominent, and the balconies have similar canopies. The houses are arranged as three pairs with partly recessed outer bays. The side elevations of numbers 8 and 13 have canted bay windows and straight-headed entrances.	
14 Montpelier Terrace	Montpelier; 50.8259°N 0.1501°W		This stuccoed two-storey terraced house stands at the junction of Montpelier Terrace and Montpelier Street, and presents three-window façades to each. A Classical-style doorcase has pilasters and an entablature, and other elements include ground-floor rustication, a canopied cast iron balcony and a coach house to the rear.	
16 Montpelier Terrace^{[E]}	Montpelier; 50.8259°N 0.1513°W		Also known as Montpelier Lodge, this is a rare example of a red-brick building in the Montpelier area. Its five-bay façade is flanked by lower recessed wings of unequal width. Doric columns supporting an entablature and cornice surround the entrance. The slate roof is hipped. The building dates from about 1830.	
1 and 2 Montpelier Villas^{[F]}	Montpelier; 50.8264°N 0.1506°W		The southeasternmost of the ten pairs of villas in this street were among the earliest built to Amon Wilds's design: they date from 1845. The entrances are in the side elevations, which have four windows to each of two storeys. The walls are stuccoed and rusticated, and the hipped roof is of slate.	
3 and 4 Montpelier Villas^{[F]}	Montpelier; 50.8266°N 0.1504°W		This pair of houses have stepped entrances flanked by pilasters and topped by a balustraded balcony at first-floor level. Other details are similar to the other sets of villas, all designed by Amon Wilds in the 1840s.	
5 and 6 Montpelier Villas^{[F]}	Montpelier; 50.8268°N 0.1503°W		These are similar to their neighbours, with pilastered entrances set below a balcony with a decorative balustrade, stuccoed walls, slate roofs and two windows facing Montpelier Villas. The side walls have only three windows to each floor, though. The eaves are elaborately decorated.	
7 and 8 Montpelier Villas^{[F]}	Montpelier; 50.8270°N 0.1502°W		The bay windows on these houses have decorative features such as small canopied balconies and domes. The slate roof is supported on deep bracketed eaves. Rustication covers the whole of the ground floor.	
9 and 10 Montpelier Villas^{[F]}	Montpelier; 50.8272°N 0.1502°W		Heavy rustication at ground-floor level and on the quoins is one of the features of this pair of houses, which was one of the last to be completed and which is slightly larger and more simply detailed.	
11 and 12 Montpelier Villas^{[F]}	Montpelier; 50.8273°N 0.1506°W		These houses are at the junction of Victoria Road, and number 11 has six windows per floor on its side elevation rather than the standard three. One of the ground-floor windows is a canted bay, but the others are flat and straight-headed.	
13 and 14 Montpelier Villas^{[F]}	Montpelier; 50.8271°N 0.1507°W		The standard design of the houses on this road is again reflected in this pair: rusticated stucco, slate roof with chimneys, two windows facing the road, stepped entrances to the side, and domed windows with balconies.	
15 and 16 Montpelier Villas^{[F]}	Montpelier; 50.8269°N 0.1508°W		As with all the other pairs of villas, the rear section of this building is wider, giving space for the entrances to fit into the angle and necessitating a separate roofline at the rear. With two storeys, two windows facing the road and three on the side elevations, they are of the same design as their neighbours.	
17 and 18 Montpelier Villas^{[F]}	Montpelier; 50.8267°N 0.1509°W		Identical in layout and decoration to the other "delightful" sets of villas on this street, this pair also had a famous resident: number 17 was owned by author Francis King until he had to sell it to pay legal costs in a case brought by near-neighbour Thomas Skeffington-Lodge.	
19 and 20 Montpelier Villas^{[F]}	Montpelier; 50.8265°N 0.1510°W		These were some of the last houses to be built on the road, and like the others they retain much of their mid-19th-century appearance: the same Italianate/late Regency style used by Amon Wilds on the other houses is in evidence here.	
Monument to Amon Wilds	West Hill; 50.8250°N 0.1439°W		This stone memorial was designed and put up by the architect's son Amon Henry Wilds in 1833, and also commemorates his first and second wives. It is flanked by ammonite capitals and has a lengthy inscription. Below the headstone lies a table-tomb.	
Monument to Anna Maria Crouch	West Hill; 50.8255°N 0.1445°W		An actress, singer and mistress of the Prince of Wales, Anna Maria Crouch is commemorated by an elaborate Coade stone tomb with Classical details and putti. It is now in poor condition. Actor and singer Michael Kelly erected it after her burial on 6 October 1805.	
Monument to Martha Gunn	West Hill; 50.8252°N 0.1446°W		Martha Gunn was the most celebrated of Brighton's dippers—operators of the bathing machines which were used for sea-bathing by the town's fashionable visitors in the 18th and 19th centuries. She retired in 1814, one year before her death, aged 87. The grave has a headstone, bodystone and footstone.	
Monument to Nicholas Tettersell	West Hill; 50.8252°N 0.1447°W		Tettersell, a boat-owner, helped King Charles II escape to France after the Battle of Worcester in 1651. His table-tomb, although restored in the 1860s, dates from 1674 and is the oldest surviving in the churchyard. On the lid is a description of his actions.	
Monument to Phoebe Hessel	West Hill; 50.8251°N 0.1447°W		Phoebe Hessel's listed grave consists of a headstone and footstone, and was restored in the 1970s. Hessel lived to 108 and apparently disguised herself as a man for 17 years to be with her soldier husband. Widowed, she moved to Brighton in the 1760s and married a local man, and became well known in the town.	
Monument to Sake Deen Mahomed	West Hill; 50.8255°N 0.1446°W		Born in Patna in 1749, Sake Deen Mahomed moved to Brighton in 1814 and introduced his "Indian Medicated Vapour Bath" and shampooing treatment which became fashionable and received royal patronage. He died at 32 Grand Parade in 1851, and is interred in this tomb with his son.	
Moulsecoomb Place	Moulsecoomb; 50.8465°N 0.1172°W		Moulsecoomb is an ancient manor, but its manor house was rebuilt in the early 18th century, refronted in 1790 and extended in 1906 and 1913. Brighton Corporation bought it in 1925, then sold it to the University of Brighton in 1993. The seven-bay façade is of yellow brick, and there are some Palladian and Gothic Revival details.	
2 Mount Zion Place	West Hill; 50.8256°N 0.1446°W		This house was built for William Shelley, beadle of the adjacent St Nicholas' Church, in 1821. The three-bay façade is of yellow and red brick below a shallow slate roof with an end chimney-stack. Inside the later gabled porch is an architrave-topped doorway.	

== See also ==
- Buildings and architecture of Brighton and Hove
- Cemeteries and crematoria in Brighton and Hove
- Grade I listed buildings in Brighton and Hove
- Grade II* listed buildings in Brighton and Hove
- List of conservation areas in Brighton and Hove
