= Moulsecoomb Place =

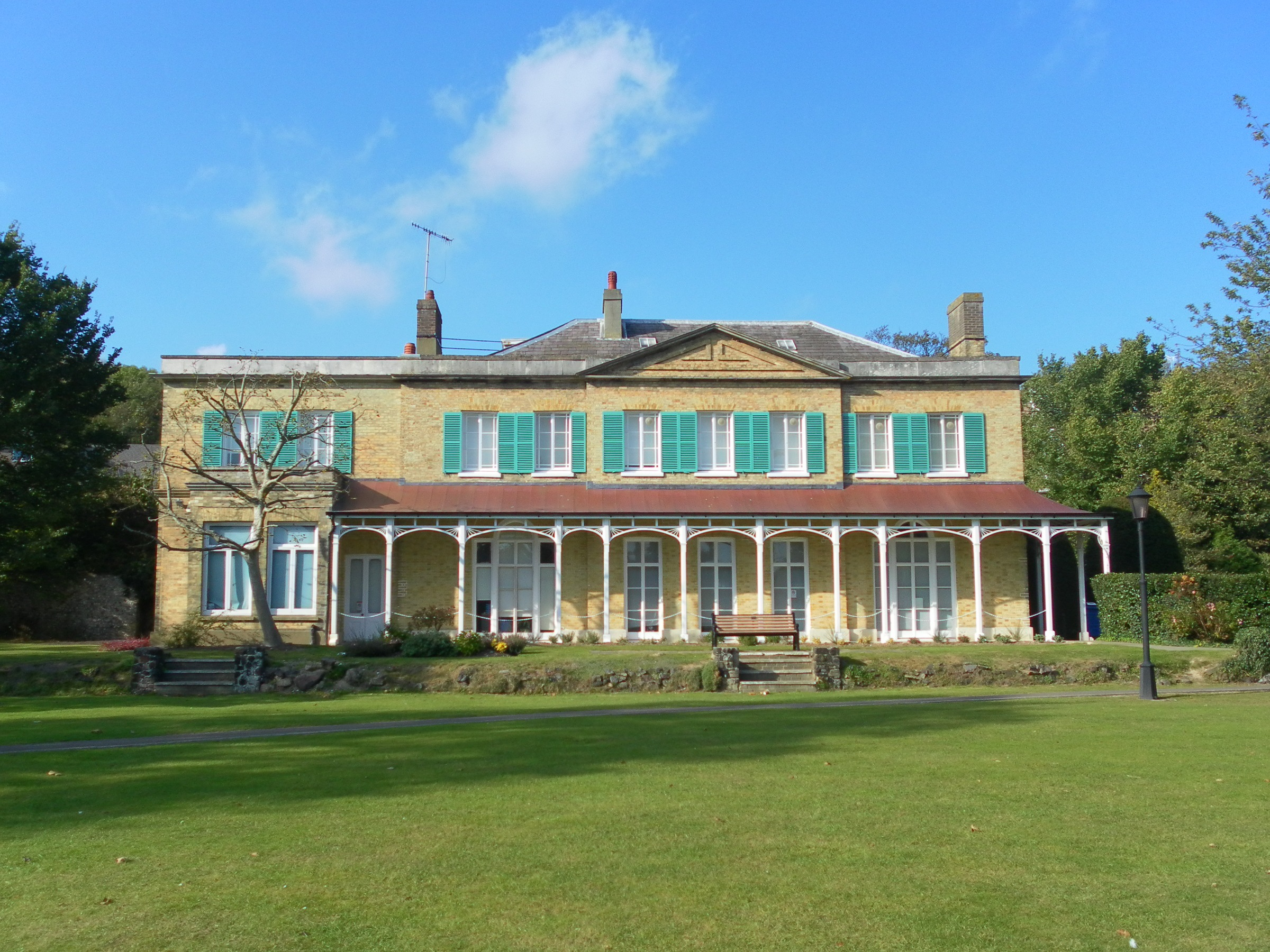
- Moulsecoomb Place after renovation in 2011, seen from the southeast

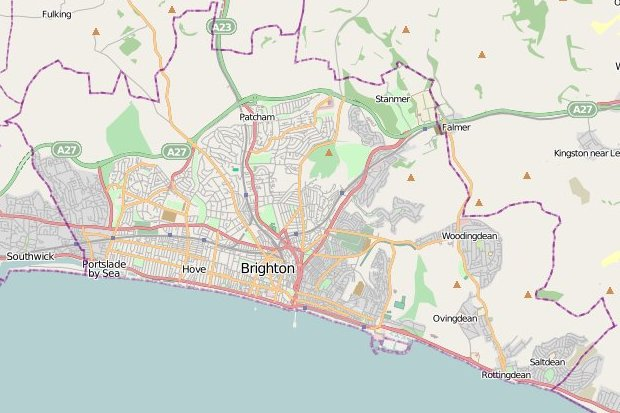
- Location within Brighton and Hove
- 50.8465°N 0.1172°W
- Location: Lewes Road, Moulsecoomb, Brighton and Hove BN2 4GA, United Kingdom

History
- Founded: Early 18th century (as farmhouse)
- Built: 1790
- Built for: Benjamin Tillstone

Site notes
- Architectural style: Neoclassical/Palladian
- Restored: 1906 or 1913, 2010–11
- Governing body: University of Brighton (owner)

Listed Building – Grade II
- Official name: Moulsecoomb Place
- Designated: 20 August 1971
- Reference no.: 1381668

Moulsecoomb Place is a large 18th-century house on Lewes Road in the Moulsecoomb area of the English coastal city of Brighton and Hove. Originally a farmhouse based in an agricultural area in the parish of Patcham, north of Brighton, it was bought and extensively remodelled in 1790 for a long-established local family. It was their seat for over 100 years, but the Neoclassical-style mansion and its grounds were bought by the local council in the interwar period when Moulsecoomb was transformed into a major council estate. Subsequent uses have varied, and Moulsecoomb Place later became part of the University of Brighton's range of buildings. Student housing has been built to the rear; but much of the grounds, the house itself and a much older cottage and barn attached to the rear have been preserved. The house is a Grade II Listed building.

== History ==
At the time of the Domesday survey in 1086, Moulsecoomb was an outlying part of the large parish of Patcham, which was centred on Patcham village north of Brighton. Spelt Mulescumba at that time, the name varied considerably over the centuries and was not standardised to its current spelling until the 1960s. The manor and estate of Moulsecoomb later belonged to Lewes Priory, and Mouscombe Farm was first named in the early 17th century when it was owned by Sir Edward Culpepper. On his death in 1730, it was left to Sir William Culpeper, 1st Baronet of Preston Hall, the first of the Culpeper baronets. By this time, nothing more than a farming hamlet had developed in the steep-sided valley: it had no church of its own, and was dependent on Patcham.

In the early 16th century, a timber-framed hall house was built on the estate near the farm (although some sources claim a late-14th-century date). A wooden tithe barn was erected next to it later in the 16th century, and was subsequently extended in flint. The hall house is the oldest secular building in Brighton, and is presumed to be a remnant of a larger medieval manor house—perhaps the forerunner of the present Moulsecoomb Place, which has its origins in the early 18th century. At that time, when the farm was still in agricultural use, a farmhouse was built adjoining the hall house. In 1790, Benjamin Tillstone bought the farm and converted it into a rural retreat with the farmhouse as its centrepiece. He commissioned a major overhaul of Moulsecoomb Place, extending the façade and refacing it in yellow brick.

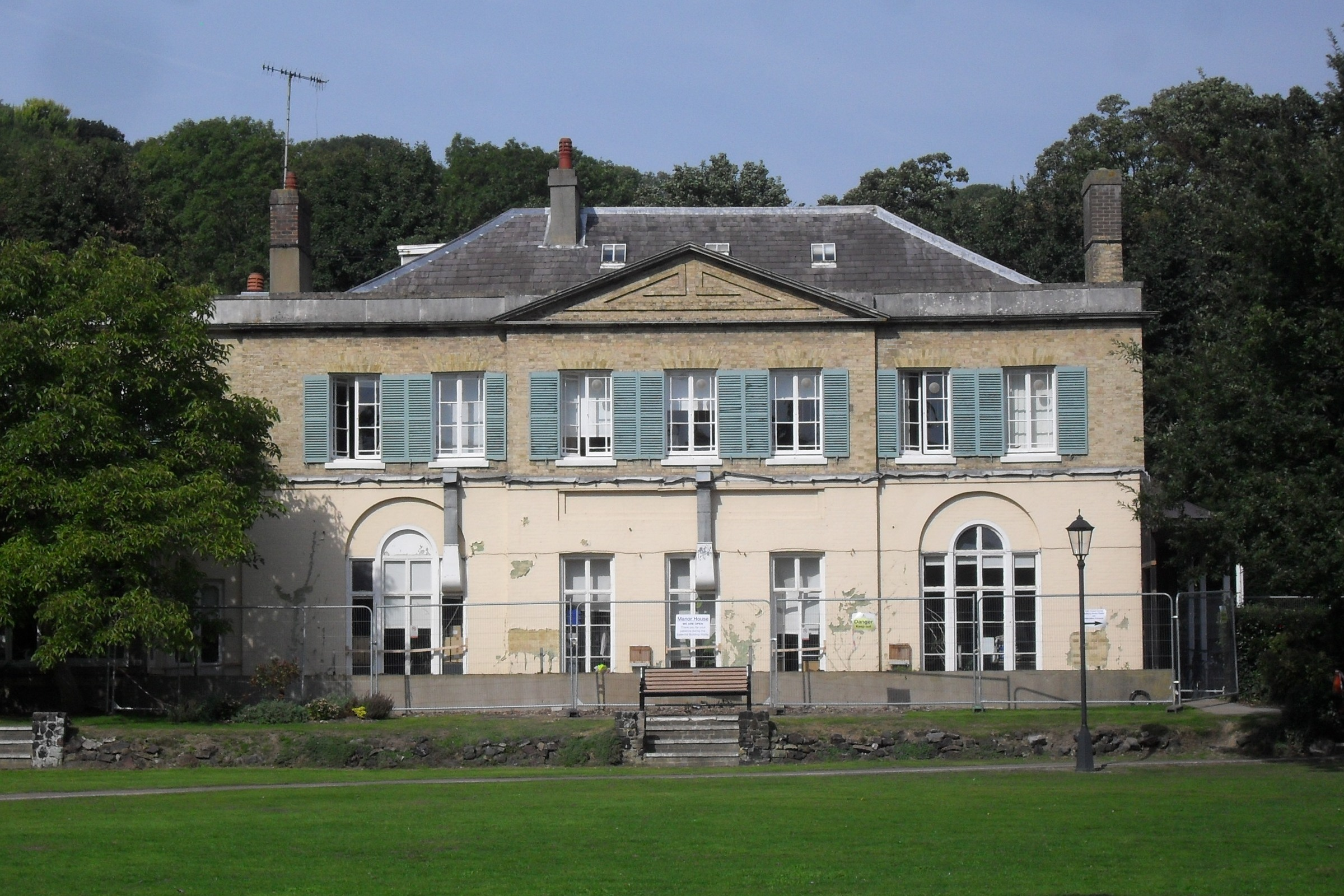
Moulsecoomb Place underwent maintenance in 2010. The early 20th-century extension is hidden behind the tree to the left.

The building was thereafter the seat of the locally important Tillstone family for more than a century, and was the centrepiece of an estate extending to 1,000 acres (400 ha). A wide verandah was added to the house at ground-floor level by 1810, and the hall house was converted into stables. A regular visitor around this time was the Prince Regent (later King George IV), a friend of the family. He had his own bedroom above the drawing room, and a dovecote near the house was adapted into a summer house, in which the prince would sit and practise playing a silver flute he had received from Tillstone. The dovecote was accordingly known as Prince's Tower, but was vandalised beyond repair in 1942. Three "huge mahogany doors" in the house were given by the prince in return; they may have come from the demolished Grove House at Old Steine, where the prince stayed when he first visited Brighton in 1783. More work was carried out on the building in 1906 or 1913, when a further two bays were added to the south side of the seven-bay façade.

The final Tillstone family owner, Mr. B.T. Rogers-Tillstone, sold Moulsecoomb Place and the family's estate to Brighton Corporation (predecessor of the present city council) in February 1925. Much of the land, which had been transferred from the parish of Patcham into the borough of Brighton in October 1923, was used to develop the Moulsecoomb housing estates (South, East and North Moulsecoomb), collectively the largest area of council housing in Brighton. Hundreds of "homes fit for heroes" were built to replace unsuitable inner-city slums. Moulsecoomb Place and its grounds were retained, and the building was used by the Corporation to house its Parks and Recreation Department. Later it housed Moulsecoomb's first library and was used to provide extra capacity for a local school. Between August 1948 and November 1969, part of the building was registered as a place of worship by a group of Christians known as Moulsecoomb Free Church. By 1971 most of the interior was used for offices, and a social club and bar occupied the hall house.

The building is next to the main (Moulsecoomb) campus of the University of Brighton. In 1993, the university submitted a plan to buy Moulsecoomb Place and its grounds, build accommodation for 163 students on the former plant nursery to the rear, and convert the building itself and the old tithe barn into the headquarters of its Student Services division and a children's nursery. Permission for this was granted in the same year. The student residences consist of flats accommodating six to eight people, each with their own bedroom but with shared bathroom and laundry facilities. Breakfast and evening meals are provided on site. As of 2012, rent was £142 per week or £5,538 for a 39-week academic year tenancy. In July 2022 a property developer, Cathedral Group, announced its plans to demolish the existing student housing and rebuild at a higher density, creating a mixed-use "student village". In April 2025, Cathedral Group leased Moulsecoomb Place itself to two charities, the East Brighton Trust and AudioActive. Between them, these charities planned to convert the building into an events, community and music production venue.

Moulsecoomb Place was designated a Grade II Listed building on 20 August 1971. The timber-framed hall house to the rear had been listed on its own on 13 October 1952; in 1971 the listing was expanded to cover the whole building.

== Architecture ==
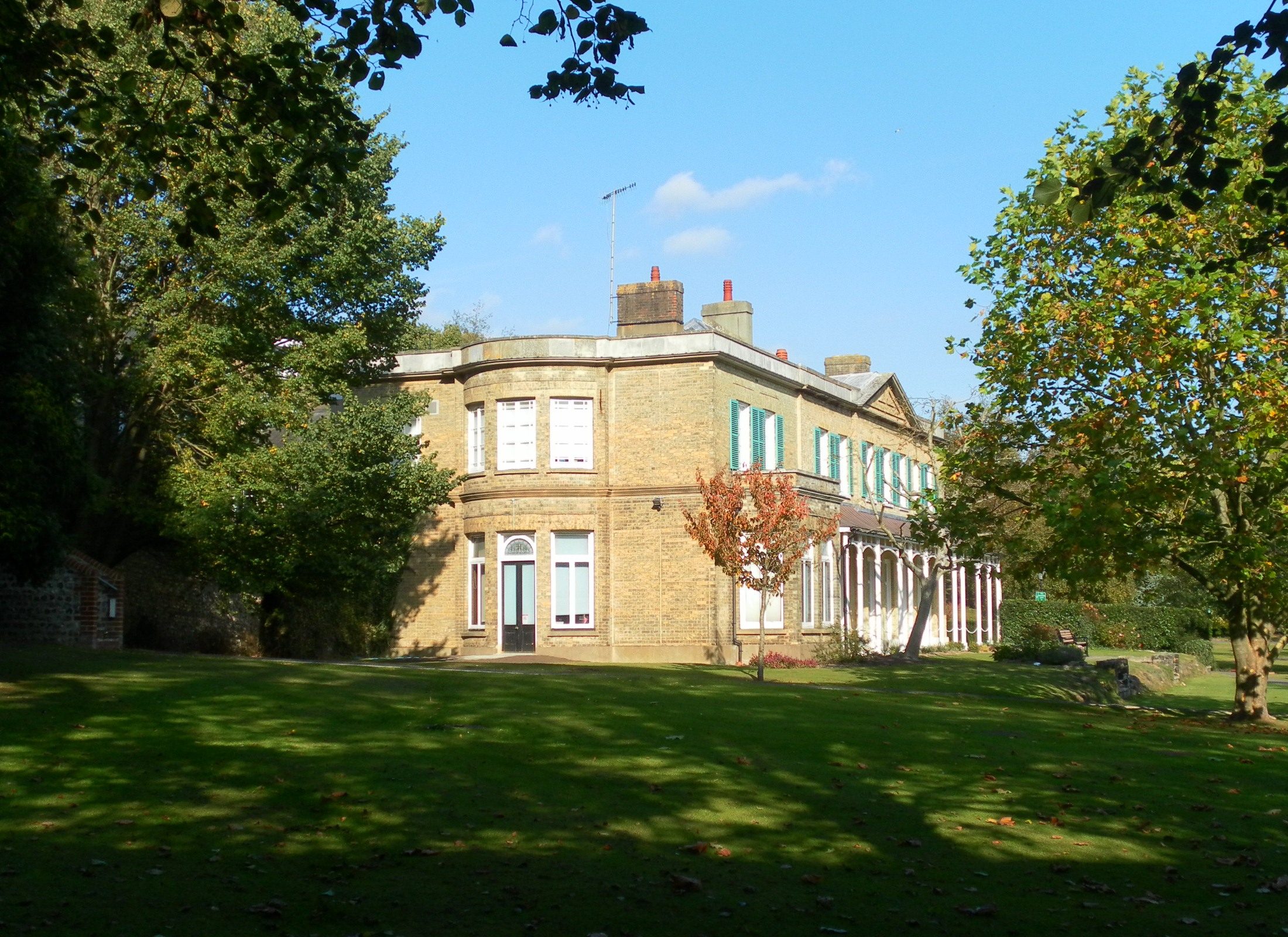
The southern extension has a bow-fronted section.

Moulsecoomb Place is the only building in the Moulsecoomb area mentioned by Ian Nairn and Nikolaus Pevsner in the Sussex edition of their Buildings of England architectural guides. They describe it as "an early 19th-century seven-bay house of yellow brick", and note that the hall house attached to the rear is "the only worthwhile timber-framed cottage in Brighton". The seven-bay façade, which faces east, is the original part dating from 1790; another two-window range was added on the south side in the early 20th century, making the composition asymmetrical. The original section has yellow brickwork in a Flemish bond pattern to the main elevation and brown and yellow gauged brickwork on the north (side) wall. Yellow bricks are also used on the south extension, but in a stretcher bond layout. The 1790 section has a 2–3–2 bay pattern whose central three-bay section projects slightly and is set beneath a pediment. Its tympanum has a pattern of raised brickwork. Behind the pediment is a parapet and a cornice with mutules below. Some of the ground-floor windows have elements of the Palladian and Neoclassical Adam styles; those at first-floor level are straight-headed. The hipped roof has several chimney-stacks. The early 20th-century extension is in complementary style. On the east elevation, a single-storey two-window section projects forward and is topped with a parapet and cornice. This continues round to the south elevation, which has a full-height bow front with a three-window range. A modern conservatory has been added to one side.

The timber-framed hall house, whose interior had been significantly altered by the time it was in use as a bar and social club, is believed to be the surviving section of a larger building dating from the medieval era. It has two storeys, the upper of which is jettied. The areas between the closely studded timber frame are filled in with a mixture of plaster, flint and brickwork, and tiles cover the hipped roof. There are some small sash windows. The tithe barn, which was extended in the 19th century, is linked to the hall house by a bridge-like section of the same date.

At the time of the listing by English Heritage, when the building was in use as offices, the interior had elaborate fittings. The main staircase is in a hall with a vaulted ceiling, in which mahogany doors with Greek Revival-style panelling lead to various rooms. Some have original fireplaces in styles including Neoclassical and Jacobean. The staircase itself has mahogany rails and Gothic Revival-style balusters of cast iron. There is some stained glass bearing the date 1913.

== See also ==
- Grade II listed buildings in Brighton and Hove: M
- Media related to Moulsecoomb Place at Wikimedia Commons
