= Moulsecoomb =

Suburb of Brighton, England

Coordinates: 50°50′49″N 0°06′33″W

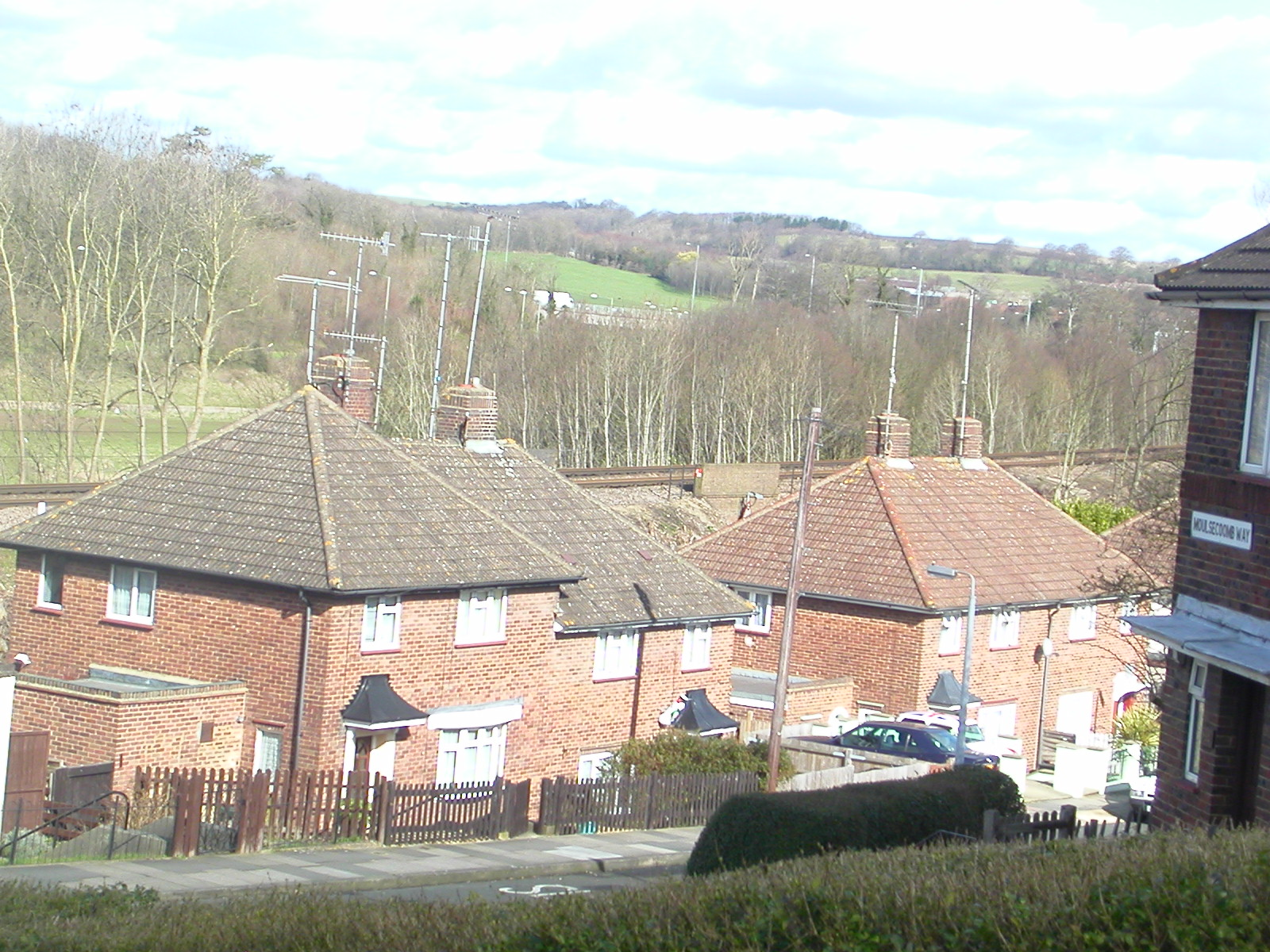
- The junction of Moulsecoomb Way and Halland Road
- Population: 17,472 (2011. Ward)
- Unitary authority: Brighton and Hove
- Ceremonial county: East Sussex
- Region: South East
- Country: England
- Sovereign state: United Kingdom
- Post town: BRIGHTON
- Postcode district: BN2
- Dialling code: 01273
- Police: Sussex
- Fire: East Sussex
- Ambulance: South East Coast
- UK Parliament: Brighton, Kemptown

Moulsecoomb (/ˈmoʊlzkuːm/) is a suburb of Brighton, Sussex, England, on the north east side around the A270 Lewes Road, between Coldean and Bevendean, 2 1/4 miles (3.6 km) north of the seafront. The eastern edge adjoins Falmer Hill on the South Downs. It is often divided into smaller sections on maps: North Moulsecoomb, East Moulsecoomb and South Moulsecoomb.

The name is sometimes pronounced as if spelt Molls-coomb by the locals. It derives from the Old English for Muls Valley. Mul may refer to Mul of Kent, a Saxon nobleman.

Moulsecoomb suffers from high social deprivation and crime rates, along with neighbouring Whitehawk. In 2001, it was in the top 5% of socially deprived areas in England.

== History and development ==
Until the First World War the land around the Lewes Road was open downland, sloping towards the valley bottom through which the road and railway line ran. The land reached a height of 508 feet (155m) at Falmer Hill, approximately 0.9 miles (1½ km) east of the point where the railway crossed the road on a viaduct. In the valley bottom, some market gardens and small nurseries were maintained.

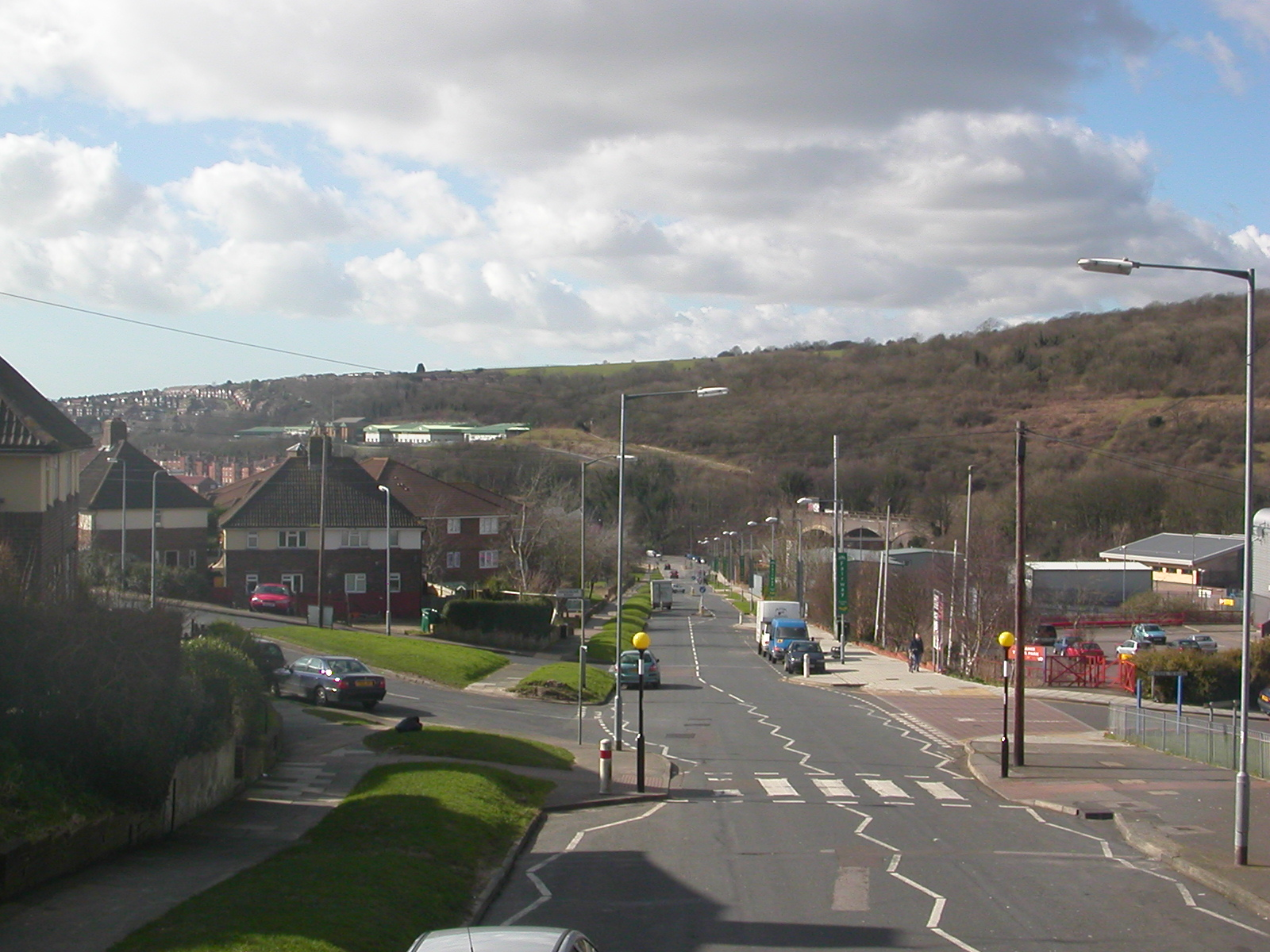
Looking down Moulsecoomb Way towards the A270 Lewes Road. The railway viaduct over the A270 is visible.

The South Moulsecoomb area was developed first: the borough council acquired land at the existing edge of the built-up area, close to the former Preston Barracks on the Lewes Road, in November 1920 and constructed 478 semi-detached houses with large gardens and three bedrooms each. The "Homes fit for Heroes" campaign, started after the war in response to the poor housing conditions faced by returning soldiers, helped to drive this, but the houses were generally too expensive for the families for which they were intended.

The council responded by acquiring more land, including some from the south end of the neighbouring Falmer parish, in 1922; housing areas began to be developed in this area from 1925 onwards. This was the original North Moulsecoomb area, which at this early stage consisted of four roads named after East Sussex villages (Barcombe, Chailey, Newick and Ringmer) situated between the Lewes Road – then an insubstantial, narrow route between the market gardens – and the railway line. By 1929, 390 houses – smaller and more tightly packed than those of South Moulsecoomb – had been built on the 46-acre (190,000 m^{2}) North Moulsecoomb site.

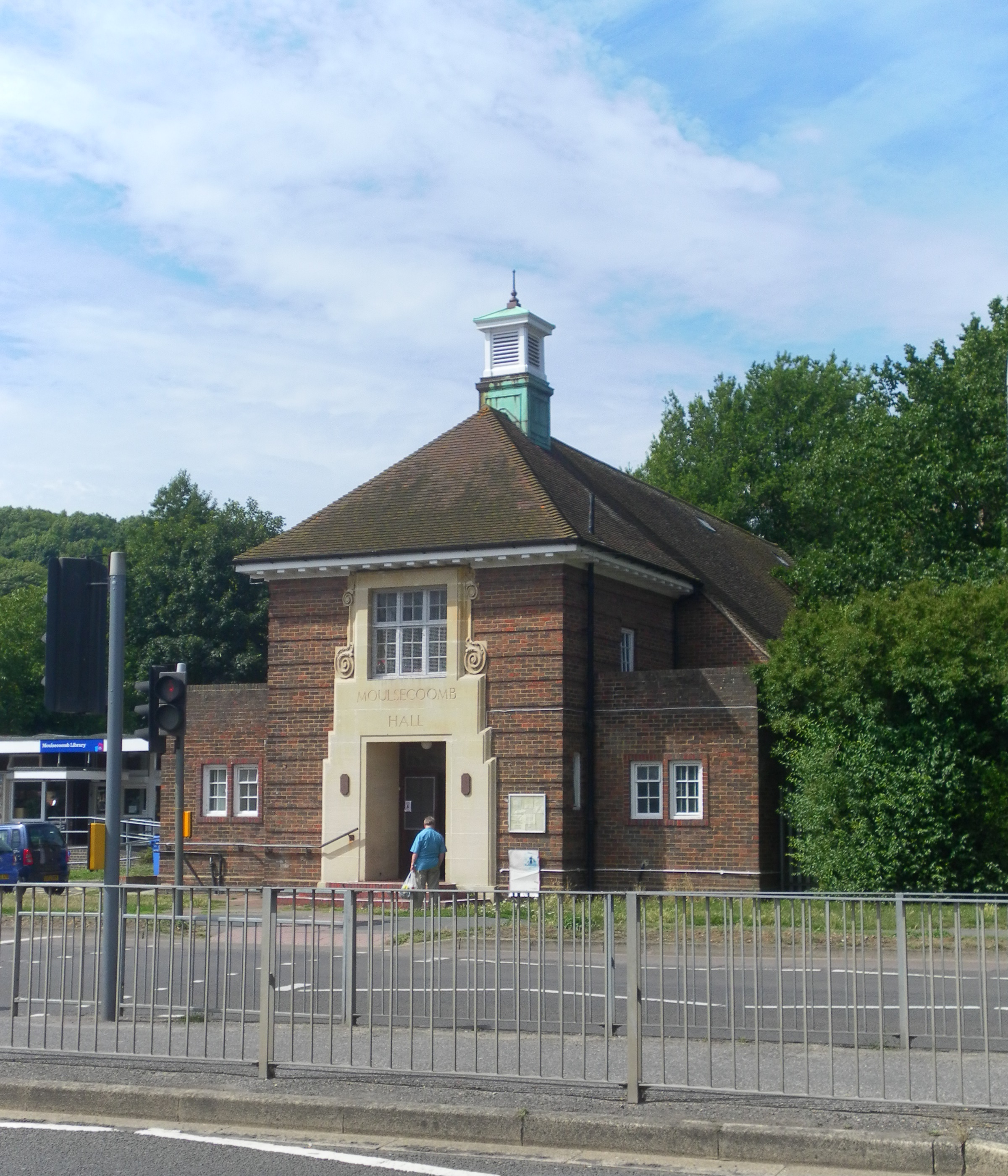
Moulsecoomb Hall

The South Moulsecoomb part of the estate was extended to the east in the early 1930s using land acquired from Lower Bevendean Farm. It is around this area that modern-day Moulsecoomb merges into the Lower Bevendean estate. After this, more land was acquired in December 1935 to extend development at the northern end to the eastern side of the railway. This area is now known as East Moulsecoomb. At first, housing spread northwards from the Higher Bevendean infill estate (an area of private housing developed at the same time as the South Moulsecoomb extension, immediately north of it), with Shortgate Road being the northern limit before the Second World War; after the war, the last few roads were developed, mostly with small blocks of flats. Moulsecoomb Hall on Lewes Road was built as a public hall and community centre in the mid-1930s.

The main purpose of such large-scale residential development was to rehouse residents who lived in slums in central Brighton; at that time, much of the residential accommodation in the inner-city area was of poor quality, and slum clearance would allow redevelopment to start as well as taking people out of inadequate, substandard and sometimes dangerous houses.

Moulsecoomb's road network, especially that built later in the East and North Moulsecoomb areas, generally follows the contours of the land rather than being in, for example, a grid pattern, and is characterised by large grass verges and a large land area for each house – many have both front and back gardens. While Moulsecoomb originally consisted exclusively of council housing, owned and operated by the council on behalf of the residents, the right to buy scheme, first implemented in the 1980s, has seen many houses pass into private ownership.

Two girls from the estate, 10-year-old Karen Hadaway and nine-year-old Nicola Fellows, went missing on 9 October 1986 and were found murdered in nearby Wild Park the following day. This case, which attracted national media attention, became known as the 'Babes in the Wood' murders.

== Education ==
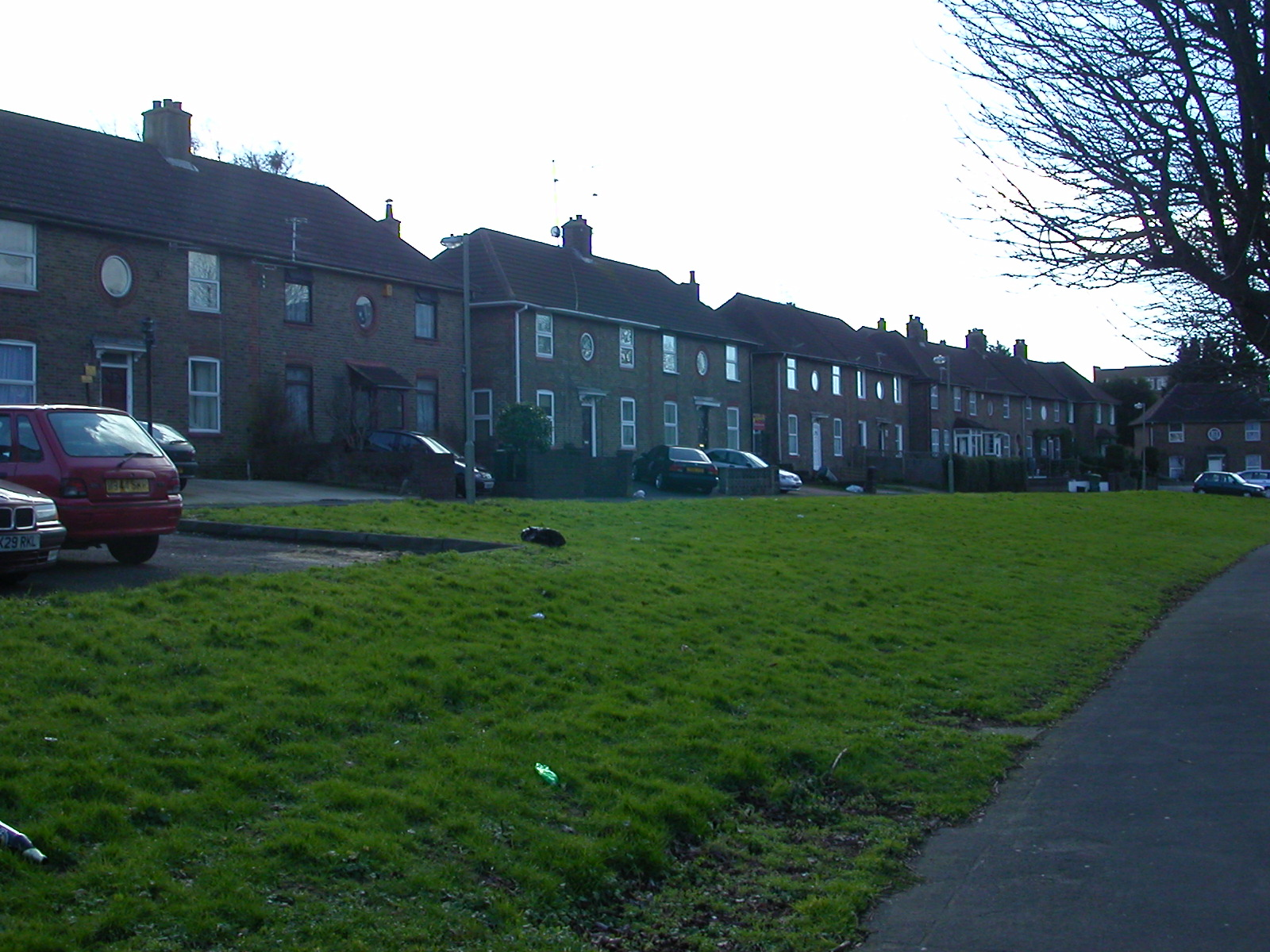
Houses on The Highway, close to Moulsecoomb railway station.

The Moulsecoomb campus of the University of Brighton is one of the university's three main sites. The 10-storey Cockcroft building dominates most views in the area. As well as teaching facilities, the majority of the university's administration departments are located here, along with some student halls of residence. Moulsecoomb Place, the oldest non-religious building in Brighton, is currently used by the accommodation and counselling services of the university. Before the university was founded in 1992, the various buildings were part of Brighton Polytechnic and before 1970 the Cockcroft Building was the main building of Brighton College of Technology.

Moulsecoomb Primary School has built a chalk house, the first one built in Britain for 5,000 years, to complement its Saxon, Mesolithic and Iron Age Roundhouse.

== Landmarks ==
Moulsecoomb is the location of the Home Farm Business Park, where the United Kingdom subsidiary of United States arms manufacturer EDO Corporation is based. This factory has been the site of regular anti-war demonstrations since 2004.

Moulsecoomb Wild Park is a large downland valley which has been preserved in its undeveloped state. It lies immediately to the west of the railway line and the Lewes Road, and merges into the Hollingbury Camp hillfort to the west and the edge of Coldean to the north. There are areas of chalk grassland and woodland and a nature trail. The Moulsecoomb Family Fun Day has been held in the park on the third Saturday in May every year since 1978.

== Culture and community ==
The Bevy community pub in Moulsecoomb opened in December 2014, following the closure of the Bevendean hotel in 2010, becoming the first community-owned pub on a housing estate in the UK.

== Religious sites ==
Moulsecoomb is home to St Andrew's Church, opened in 1934 to be the Church of England presence on the estate.

== Transport ==
Moulsecoomb railway station is on the East Coastway Line. Direct destinations include central Brighton and another major campus of Brighton University at Falmer. The main access road runs uphill from the Lewes Road alongside the Cockcroft Building.

East Moulsecoomb is the eastern terminus for Brighton & Hove Buses route 49, which runs from Portslade station via the city centre. This is one of the five Metro-branded routes. At peak times buses run every 10 minutes. The terminus of the route is the junction of Moulsecoomb Way and Bolney Road (the photograph in the first paragraph was taken from a bus at this stop). Many other bus routes serve various stops on the Lewes Road – notably route 25, another Metro route, which runs to the Falmer campus of the University of Brighton.

== Notable residents ==
- Jenny Jones, Baroness Jones of Moulsecoomb, Green Party peer
