= Michael Weir (murderer) =

British criminal

- Born: 1966 (age 59–60); Hackney, London, England
- Occupation: Serial burglar
- Convictions: Murder (×2), multiple counts of burglary
- Penalty: Life imprisonment (30-year minimum term)

Michael Weir (born 1966) is a British double murderer and serial burglar who was the first person in English legal history to have been convicted of the same crime twice. (Note: While some defendants such as Russell Causley had been convicted a second time after a court-ordered retrial, Weir's case was the first in which a person had been re-convicted after having their conviction quashed without a retrial being ordered.) In 1999, he was jailed for the murder of 78-year-old war veteran Leonard Harris. Weir's conviction was quashed a year later at the Court of Appeal on a technicality, only for him to be re-convicted in 2019 in a 'double jeopardy' case after new evidence was found. Weir was also convicted in 2019 of the murder of 83-year-old Rose Seferian, who was also killed during a burglary five weeks after Harris, which made additional history as the first time a second murder charge was added to a double jeopardy case. Upon Weir's conviction at the Old Bailey in December 2019, Justice Maura McGowan told the jury that they had made "legal history".

== Crimes and trials ==
Michael Weir was a serial burglar from Hackney in east London. On 28 January 1998, Weir broke into the flat of Leonard and Gertrude Harris, stole a gold watch and ring, killed Leonard Harris and injured Gertrude Harris. Three days after the attack police found a palm print on the bedroom door, but missed a match with Weir at the time as the comparative sample was of poor quality. Five weeks later, on 5 March, Weir broke into the home of 83-year-old Rose Seferian, stole jewellery and cash, and attacked and killed Seferian.

The police did not initially connect the two crimes. Weir was tried at the Old Bailey in 1999 for Harris's murder and found guilty, but in 2000 the Court of Appeal quashed his conviction on a technicality and he was freed. His conviction had been based upon DNA which police had erroneously kept on the police database, and the Court of Appeal decided that the trial judge had been wrong to admit this as evidence. The Crown Prosecution Service missed the deadline to appeal the decision to the House of Lords. The Lords later found that in Weir's case the original decision to admit the DNA evidence had been correct, but a retrial was not possible until 2003 when the Criminal Justice Act 2003 was passed in England and Wales to allow those acquitted of crimes to be re-tried if new and compelling evidence was found.

In 2019 Weir was re-tried for Harris's murder after the palm print found at the scene at the time was finally matched to him and because new forensic techniques not available in 1998 revealed that his DNA was at the scene. He was also charged with the murder of Seferian after palm prints found on the window he broke in through were matched to him. Weir had no explanation for the forensic evidence and was convicted of Harris's murder again at the Old Bailey in 14 November 2019, as well as for the murder of Seferian. Harris's daughter-in-law expressed her anger at Weir's original conviction having been quashed, saying: "The defendant has been allowed to get on with his life for 21 years". Justice Maura McGowan told the jury that they had made "legal history" by convicting a defendant a second time of the same crime. Weir was sentenced to life imprisonment in 16 December 2019, and will not be eligible for release until he has served at least thirty years.

== See also ==
- Double jeopardy in the UK post-2003
- Murder of Amanda Duffy
- Jessie McTavish
- David Smith – British man similarly convicted of murder in a 'double jeopardy' case
