= Wild Park =

Park in Brighton, England

Coordinates: 50.855°N 0.122°W

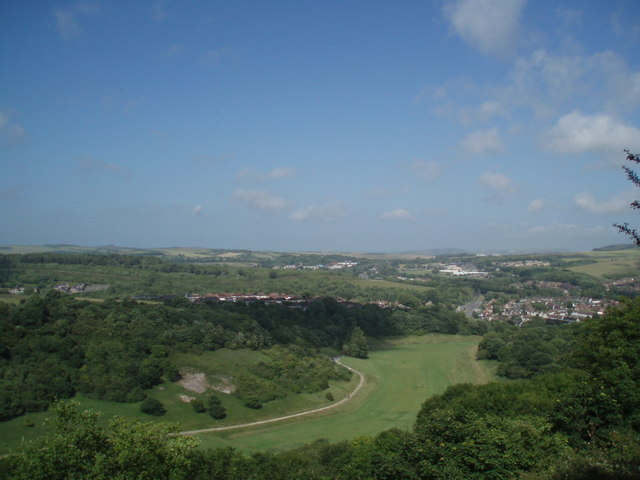
- Wild Park viewed from Hollingbury Hill
- Interactive map of Wild Park
- Type: Local Nature Reserve
- Location: Lewes Road, Brighton, East Sussex
- OS grid: TQ 323 079
- Area: 239.8 hectares (593 acres)
- Manager: Brighton and Hove City Council

Wild Park is a 239.8-hectare (593-acre) Local Nature Reserve adjacent to Lewes Road in Brighton, East Sussex. It is owned and managed by Brighton and Hove City Council. It includes Hollingbury Castle, an Iron Age hillfort which is a Scheduled Monument, and Hollingbury Park golf course.

The park has views over Brighton. Species-rich chalk grassland is managed by sheep grazing. There is extensive woodland with a network of footpaths, large areas of scrub and a dew pond.

On 9 October 1986, two nine-year-old girls, Nicola Fellows and Karen Hadaway, were murdered by 20-year-old local roofer Russell Bishop in the Babes in the Wood murders.
