= List of places of worship in Brighton and Hove =

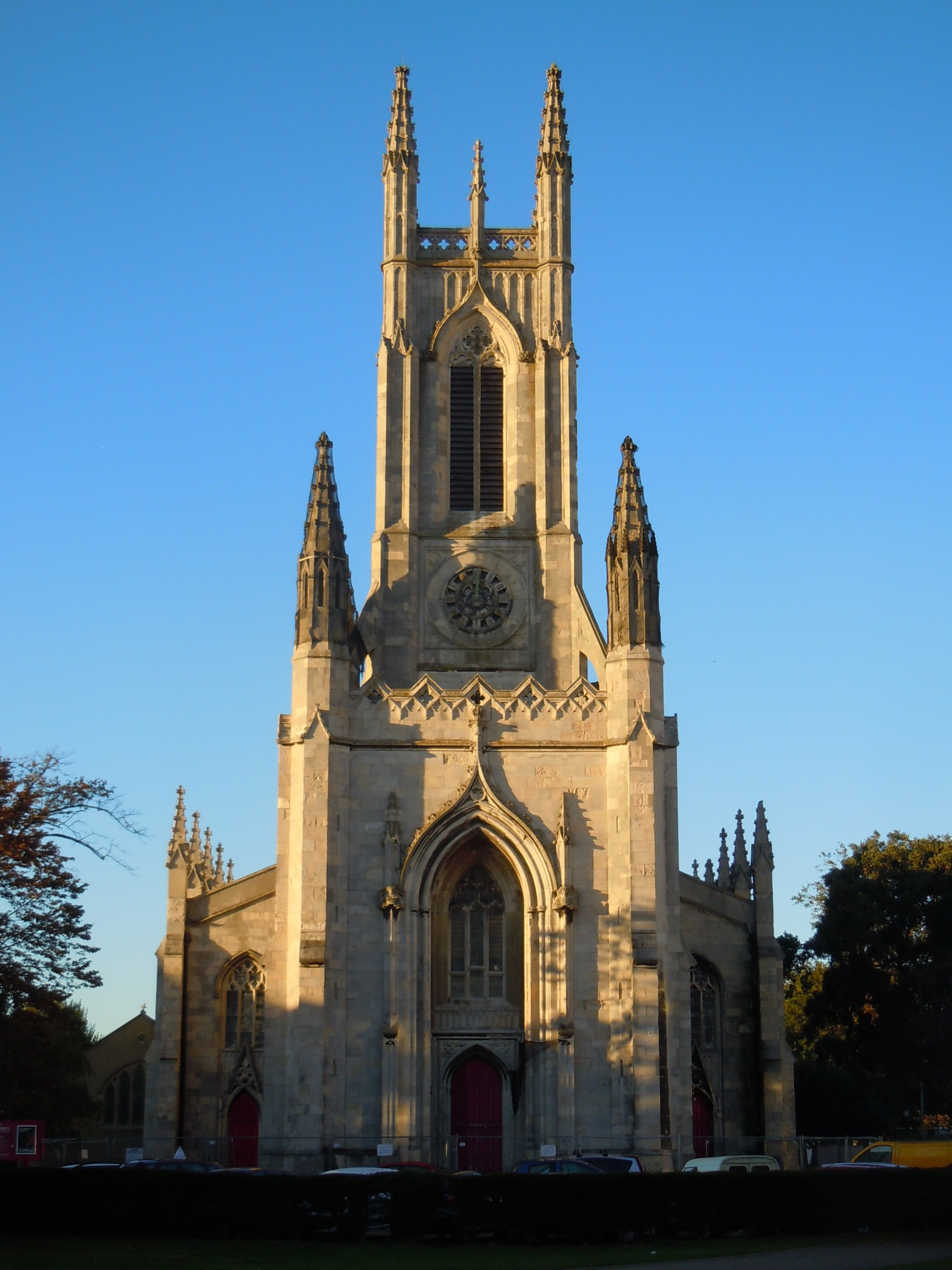
St Peter's Church is the former parish church of Brighton

The city of Brighton and Hove, on the south coast of England, has more than 100 extant churches and other places of worship, which serve a variety of Christian denominations and other religions. More than 50 former religious buildings, although still in existence, are no longer used for their original purpose.

The history of the area now covered by Brighton and Hove spans nearly 1000 years, although the city has only existed in its present form since 2000. The small settlement of Bristelmestune, mentioned in the Domesday Book, developed into a locally important fishing village, and was saved from its 18th-century decline by the patronage of the Prince Regent and British high society. Hove, to the west, had modest origins; rapid growth in the 19th century caused it to merge with Brighton, although it has always tried to maintain its separate identity. During the 20th century, both boroughs expanded by absorbing surrounding villages such as Patcham, Hangleton, West Blatchington and Ovingdean, each of which had an ancient church at their centre. New housing estates such as Mile Oak, Moulsecoomb and Saltdean were built on land acquired by the boroughs.

Apart from the ancient parish churches of Brighton (St Nicholas) and Hove (St Andrew's), and those of the nearby villages that are now part of the city, few places of worship existed until the 19th century. During that century, however—and especially in the Victorian era—England experienced a surge in church-building, which left its mark on both Brighton and Hove. Reverend Henry Michell Wagner (Vicar of Brighton between 1824 and 1870) and his son Reverend Arthur Wagner founded and funded a succession of Anglican churches for the benefit of Brighton's rapidly growing population, while enduring controversy and conflict over their political and religious ideals; many churches were founded in Hove; and Roman Catholic, Baptist, Unitarian, Jewish and other places of worship became established for the first time. Although overcapacity and increasing maintenance costs have led to some closures and demolitions, new churches continued to be established throughout the 20th century on the new housing estates.

== Religious affiliation in Brighton and Hove ==
As of the 2001 United Kingdom Census, 247,817 people lived in Brighton and Hove. Of these, 59.1% were Christian, 1.47% were Muslim, 1.36% were Jewish, 0.7% were Buddhist, 0.52% were Hindu, 0.1% were Sikh, 0.85% were affiliated with another religion, 27.02% followed no religion and 8.88% did not state their religion. Some of these proportions are significantly different from those of England as a whole. Judaism and Buddhism have a much greater following: 0.52% of people in England are Jewish and 0.28% are Buddhist. Christianity is much less widespread in the city than in the country overall, in which 71.74% people identify themselves as Christian. The proportion of people with no religious affiliation is nearly twice as high as that of England as a whole (14.59%).

== Administration ==
All Anglican churches in the city are administered by the Diocese of Chichester, and (at the level below this) by the Archdeaconry of Chichester, one of three archdeaconries in the diocese. The Rural Deanery of Brighton is one of five deaneries under the archdeaconry. It covers 28 extant churches and 9 that are no longer used for worship. One of its churches, St Laurence at Falmer, is in the neighbouring district of Lewes. The Rural Deanery of Hove, also part of the Archdeaconry of Chichester, has 28 churches, of which five are closed; eight are in the Adur district of West Sussex, as the deanery covers Kingston Buci, Southwick and Shoreham-by-Sea as well as Hove and Portslade.

The 11 Roman Catholic churches in the city are in Brighton and Hove Deanery, one of thirteen deaneries in the Diocese of Arundel and Brighton. The deanery has 13 churches, but those in Peacehaven and Southwick are outside the city boundaries, in Lewes District and Adur District respectively. The parish of Southwick's church, St Theresa of Lisieux, has covered the Portslade area of Brighton and Hove since 1992, when the Church of Our Lady Star of the Sea and St Denis in Portslade was declared redundant and demolished after 80 years.

Of the Baptist churches in Brighton and Hove, five are part of the Mid Sussex Network of the South Eastern Baptist Association, one of nine divisions of the Baptist Union of Great Britain: the Holland Road and New Life Christian churches in Hove; and the One Church, Downs Baptist and Good News churches in Brighton. The Ebenezer Reformed Baptist Church is part of GraceNet UK, an association of Reformed Evangelical Christian churches and organisations, as was Montpelier Place Baptist Church (closed in 2012 and subsequently demolished). Galeed Strict Baptist Chapel is affiliated with the Gospel Standard Baptist movement.

In 1972, the Congregational Church and the Presbyterian Church of England merged to form the United Reformed Church. All United Reformed churches in the city are part of the Southern Synod, one of 13 synods within the Church. The city's five Methodist churches are in the Brighton and Hove Methodist Circuit.

== Buildings with listed status ==
In England, a building or structure is defined as "listed" when it is placed on a statutory register of buildings of "special architectural or historic interest" by the Secretary of State for Culture, Media and Sport, a Government department, in accordance with the Planning (Listed Buildings and Conservation Areas) Act 1990. English Heritage, a non-departmental public body, acts as an agency of this department to administer the process. There are three grades of listing status. Grade I, the highest, is defined as being of "exceptional interest"; Grade II* is used for "particularly important buildings of more than special interest"; and Grade II, the lowest, is used for "nationally important" buildings of "special interest".

As of February 2001, there were 24 Grade I-listed buildings, 70 Grade II*-listed buildings and 1,124 Grade II-listed buildings in Brighton and Hove. Five of the Grade I-listed buildings are churches; all are Anglican. There are 18 Grade II*-listed places of worship: 15 Anglican churches, two Roman Catholic churches and a synagogue. Twenty-eight current and former places of worship have Grade II status.

In February 2015, Brighton and Hove City Council adopted a new draft "local list of heritage assets". Hundreds of buildings and structures in the city were assessed against criteria which covered their "local historic, architectural, design and townscape value", and those meeting the criteria were designated as locally listed buildings (subject to final approval by the council's Economic Development and Culture Committee later in 2015). Buildings on the draft list include nearly 30 current and former places of worship.

Grade	Criteria
Grade I	Buildings of exceptional interest, sometimes considered to be internationally important.
Grade II*	Particularly important buildings of more than special interest.
Grade II	Buildings of national importance and special interest.
Locally listed (L)	Buildings considered by the council "to be of special interest, because of their local historic, architectural, design or townscape value".

== Current places of worship ==
Current places of worship
Name	Image	Location	Denomination	Grade	Notes
All Saints Church (More images)		Hove; 50.8303°N 0.1674°W	Anglican	I	The church, on one of Hove's main crossroads, was built by John Loughborough Pearson between 1889 and 1891 and became the parish church in 1892. It was extended in 1901 and 1924, although a proposed tower was never completed. The exterior is mainly Sussex sandstone; stone and oak predominate inside.
St Bartholomew's Church (More images)		New England Quarter; 50.8308°N 0.1372°W	Anglican	I	Arthur Wagner established a temporary church near Brighton railway station in 1868, but planned to build a much larger church to serve the same area. In 1873 he designed a building 170 feet (52 m) long, 58 feet (18 m) wide and 135 feet (41 m) high. This is taller than Westminster Abbey, and the nave is the highest of any parish church in Britain.
St Michael and All Angels Church (More images)		Montpelier; 50.8274°N 0.1498°W	Anglican	I	This supplemented the nearby St Stephen's Church following the rapid development of the Montpelier and Clifton Hill areas west of Brighton railway station in the early 19th century. Originally a chapel of ease to St Nicholas Church, it was given its own parish in 1924. The large Italianate building is sometimes known as "The Cathedral of the Back Streets".
St Wulfran's Church (More images)		Ovingdean; 50.8157°N 0.0775°W	Anglican	I	Ovingdean, an agricultural village north of Rottingdean, joined the Borough of Brighton in 1928. Its centrepiece is the 12th-century church, built of flint with a tower and "Sussex Cap" spire. It may have been damaged by the same French raiders who desecrated St Margaret's Church. Only one other church in England is dedicated to St Wulfran, a French archbishop.
All Saints Church (More images)		Patcham; 50.8666°N 0.1507°W	Anglican	II*	Patcham became part of the former Borough of Brighton in 1928; it was previously a separate village. A church was known to exist at the time of the Domesday Book, and the nave and parts of the chancel of the present building date from the 12th century. It was extensively restored in the 19th century.
Chapel Royal (More images)		Brighton; 50.8226°N 0.1394°W	Anglican	II*	Brighton's second Anglican church was built to encourage the Prince Regent to attend church more often when he was staying in the town. He laid the foundation stone in 1793 and attended the first service in 1795, but later took offence at a sermon and stopped worshipping at the chapel. It was parished in 1897.
St Andrew's Church (More images)		Hove; 50.8286°N 0.1750°W	Anglican	II*	The original parish church of Hove (and later Hove-cum-Preston, a combined parish that existed from 1531 to 1878) was of 12th-century origin, but fell into disrepair and was rebuilt by George Basevi in neo-Norman style in the 1830s after the population of Hove started to grow.
St Barnabas Church (More images)		Hove; 50.8346°N 0.1774°W	Anglican	II*	The Vicar of Hove asked John Loughborough Pearson to build a church near Hove railway station in response to rapid residential development in the late 19th century. St Barnabas opened in 1883. The knapped flint and red-brick Early English style church is topped by a tall, narrow flèche.
St Helen's Church (More images)		Hangleton; 50.8511°N 0.2009°W	Anglican	II*	Hangleton became part of the former Borough of Hove in 1928. Originally a Norman church, it remained almost untouched in a high, isolated position on the South Downs above Hove until restoration in the 1870s. Despite other alterations, especially since Hangleton developed as a 1950s housing estate, the church retains much of its medieval character.
St Margaret's Church (More images)		Rottingdean; 50.8068°N 0.0575°W	Anglican	II*	The ancient parish church of Rottingdean was absorbed into Brighton in 1928. The Normans rebuilt a Saxon church in the 13th century, and much of this structure survives—despite damage caused by a French raid in 1377. The cruciform, flint-built church has a large churchyard. Rudyard Kipling, his uncle Sir Edward Burne-Jones and Prime Minister Stanley Baldwin all had links with the church.
St Martin's Church (More images)		Round Hill; 50.8333°N 0.1284°W	Anglican	II*	Arthur Wagner built this church in 1875 using £3,000 set aside by his father for that purpose. A building committee, set up by Henry Michell Wagner before his death, allowed Arthur Wagner and his half-brothers to choose the site themselves.
St Mary the Virgin Church (More images)		Kemptown; 50.8203°N 0.1294°W	Anglican	II*	This large, red-brick Victorian church, described as having "one of the best church interiors in Sussex", was built between 1877 and 1879. It replaced a Neoclassical building in the style of a Greek temple that collapsed in 1876, 50 years after it was founded on land donated by the Earl of Egremont.
St Nicholas Church (More images)		West Hill; 50.8254°N 0.1449°W	Anglican	II*	Brighton's only Anglican church until the end of the 18th century was also its parish church until 1873. A church existed in the 11th century in the fishing village of Bristelmstune—probably on this site. The tower and some interior structures are 14th-century, but some Norman-era parts remain. The church survived a French raid in 1514. Richard Cromwell Carpenter rebuilt it in 1853 as a memorial to the Duke of Wellington.
St Nicolas Church (More images)		Portslade; 50.8431°N 0.2182°W	Anglican	II*	Portslade developed inland around a north–south Roman road. The parish church has 12th-century origins. Victorian restoration erased some 15th-century wall paintings, and an elaborate memorial chapel for a wealthy local family was added in 1874.
St Paul's Church (More images)		Brighton; 50.8221°N 0.1444°W	Anglican	II*	This is the oldest of six churches built on the instruction of Henry Michell Wagner in which Anglican worship still takes place. Three earlier churches have been demolished or sold. Opened in 1849 just before Wagner's son Arthur was ordained, it was intended as Arthur's own church, at which he could start his ecclesiastical career. He stayed for 52 years until his death in 1902.
St Peter's Church (More images)		Brighton; 50.8283°N 0.1350°W	Anglican	II*	Brighton's parish church between 1873 and 2009 was designed by Charles Barry in the Gothic Revival style and built between 1824 and 1828 at a prominent location described at the time as "the entrance to the town". The Portland stone and Sussex sandstone building is costly to maintain, and had been proposed for redundancy by the Diocese of Chichester. In May 2009, Holy Trinity Brompton in London agreed to take it over.
St Peter's Church (More images)		West Blatchington; 50.8472°N 0.1851°W	Anglican	II*	West Blatchington, a village on the South Downs east of Hangleton, was absorbed into the erstwhile Borough of Hove in 1928. Its medieval parish church fell into disrepair by the 17th century but was restored in the 1890s and extended in the 1960s by John Leopold Denman following substantial population growth in the area.
Bishop Hannington Memorial Church (More images)		West Blatchington; 50.8428°N 0.1871°W	Anglican	II	This yellow brick church was built between 1938 and 1939 by Edward Maufe, the architect of Guildford Cathedral. The name commemorates James Hannington, first bishop of East Equatorial Africa, who was murdered in Uganda in 1885. Nikolaus Pevsner described the church as "Historicism at its most simplified".
Church of the Annunciation (More images)		Hanover; 50.8294°N 0.1296°W	Anglican	II	This "Wagner church" was built in 1864 to serve the Hanover district, which at the time was a poor, densely populated area with no church. It became so popular that it had to be extended in 1881 (with difficulty on the narrow site surrounded by houses). Both the original construction costs and the rebuilding were financed entirely by Arthur Wagner.
Church of the Good Shepherd (More images)		Prestonville; 50.8417°N 0.1580°W	Anglican	II	Edward Warren used variegated bricks and a simple Gothic style for this church, which was built between 1921 and 1922 on Dyke Road. It was built as a memorial to a former Vicar of the parish of Preston.
St George's Church (More images)		Kemptown; 50.8182°N 0.1193°W	Anglican	II	Thomas Read Kemp laid out the Kemp Town estate on the cliffs east of Brighton in the 1820s. In 1824 he enlisted Charles Busby to build a church; construction cost £11,000 and took two years. Its parish, established in 1879, was extended twice in the 1980s after the nearby St Anne's and St Mark's Churches were closed.
St John the Baptist's Church (More images)		Hove; 50.8268°N 0.1648°W	Anglican	II	This church was built in 1854 on a prominent site on one corner of Palmeira Square in Hove, to serve Brunswick—an exclusive residential area developed from the 1820s. It provided extra capacity to relieve the nearby St Andrew's Churches on Church Road and Waterloo Street.
St John the Evangelist's Church (More images)		Preston Village; 50.8445°N 0.1509°W	Anglican	II	This very long, stone-built church with a narrow flèche and lancet windows was designed by Arthur Blomfield in 1902 and built by the Crawley-based James Longley & Company. The stone building, faced with rock, has a chancel (added in 1926), 5¼-bay nave with aisles, vestry and carved stone reredos. It has been the parish church of Preston Village since 1908.
St Leonard's Church (More images)		Aldrington; 50.8329°N 0.2038°W	Anglican	II	St Leonard's is the parish church of Aldrington—a medieval village that became depopulated by 1800. Hove's rapid growth during the 19th century reinvigorated the area, and Richard Carpenter rebuilt the ruined church in the medieval style in 1878. The parish joined the district of Hove in 1893.
St Luke's Church (More images)		Queen's Park; 50.8277°N 0.1243°W	Anglican	II	St Luke's was provided to serve the housing development around Queen's Park, which had been laid out in 1824. The church was designed by Sir Arthur Blomfield between 1881 and 1885 in the Early English revival style in flint with stone dressings.
St Patrick's Church (More images)		Hove; 50.8260°N 0.1577°W	Anglican	II	Just on the Hove side of the border with Brighton, St Patrick's opened in 1858 and was originally dedicated to St James. Its parish was amalgamated with that of St Andrew's on Waterloo Street before the latter was closed in 1990. Most of the interior has been redeveloped as a night shelter and social centre for homeless and vulnerable people.
St Philip's Church (More images)		Hove; 50.8306°N 0.1888°W	Anglican	II	John Oldrid Scott built this church as a chapel of ease to St Leonard's Church in 1895. The Decorated Gothic church has multicoloured stone and brickwork, and now has its own parish.
Church of the Good Shepherd (More images)		Mile Oak; 50.8525°N 0.2292°W	Anglican	L	Architects Clayton, Black and Daviel designed the church, which was finished in 1967 and replaced a 1936 tin building. It was linked to St Nicolas Church in Portslade until it was assigned its own parish in 1994. The distinctive angled roof has six tall windows.
St Andrew's Church (More images)		Moulsecoomb; 50.8458°N 0.1126°W	Anglican	L	The Moulsecoomb estate developed in the 1920s and 1930s, and this church was provided at the south end in 1934 to replace a temporary building. The roof resembles an upside-down fishing vessel: Saint Andrew was a fisherman. The church is part of the Moulsecoomb Team of churches.
St Andrew's Church (More images)		Portslade; 50.8333°N 0.2136°W	Anglican	L	Portslade-by-Sea developed south of the old village in the 19th century. St Andrew's Church, built between 1863 and 1864 by Edmund Scott and extended in 1889, is now united with the parish of St Nicolas, but it originally had its own parish.
St Luke's Church (More images)		Prestonville; 50.8336°N 0.1475°W	Anglican	L	This red-brick church, with a short clock tower topped by a spire which forms a local landmark, was built as the parish church of Prestonville, an area of good-quality 1860s housing, by John Hill in 1875. Nairn and Pevsner dismissed it with one word—"poor"—in their 1965 survey of Sussex buildings.
St Mary Magdalene's Church (More images)		Coldean; 50.8638°N 0.1105°W	Anglican	L	The 18th-century barn which houses the church is the only remaining pre-20th-century building on the Coldean housing estate. The former farm building was converted into a church in 1955.
St Matthias Church (More images)		Hollingdean; 50.8457°N 0.1346°W	Anglican	L	The main church in the parish and benefice of St Matthias, which serves a large area of northeast Brighton, St Matthias was built on Ditchling Road in 1907 by Lacy W. Ridge. It is an Early English Gothic Revival red-brick church with a circular tower, short spire and hammerbeam roof.
Church of the Ascension (More images)		Westdene; 50.8582°N 0.1611°W	Anglican	–	Designed by architect John Wells-Thorpe and built on a sloping site, this brick church opened in 1958 in the middle of Westdene, an estate of mostly 1950s houses. It is part of the parish of All Saints Church, Patcham.
Holy Cross Church (More images)		Aldrington; 50.8346°N 0.1846°W	Anglican	–	Now part of the Bishop Hannington Memorial Church's parish, this church was originally a mission hall linked to St Philip's Church, and had its own parish for a period from 1932. It opened in 1903 and follows the Conservative Evangelical tradition.
Holy Cross Church (More images)		Woodingdean; 50.8365°N 0.0765°W	Anglican	–	The green-roofed brick building, completed in 1968, occupies the site of a temporary church dating from 1941.
St Cuthman's Church (More images)		Whitehawk; 50.8282°N 0.1054°W	Anglican	–	The first St Cuthman's Church on the Whitehawk estate was only six years old when it was destroyed by a Second World War bomb in 1943. Its replacement was built between 1951 and 1952 by John Leopold Denman.
St Nicholas' Church (More images)		Saltdean; 50.8054°N 0.0386°W	Anglican	–	Dedicated to Saint Nicholas by Bishop of Chichester Roger Plumpton Wilson in 1965 and consecrated in 1970, Edward Maufe's church of greyish stone blocks superseded the Saltdean estate's older temporary church.
St Richard's Church (More images)		The Knoll; 50.8399°N 0.2011°W	Anglican	–	Andrew Carden designed this grey-brick church for The Knoll housing estate, at the south end of Hangleton and within St Helen's parish, in 1961. It replaced a nearby hall which opened in 1932 and took St Richard's name in 1937.
St John the Baptist's Church (More images)		Kemptown; 50.8194°N 0.1261°W	Roman Catholic	II*	The earliest surviving Roman Catholic church in the city was the fourth Catholic church to be consecrated in England since the Reformation, although many had been built since the passing of the Roman Catholic Relief Act 1791 allowed this to happen. St John the Baptist's is a stuccoed building in the Classical style. It contains Maria Fitzherbert's tomb, and was England's first electrically lit Catholic church.
St Joseph's Church (More images)		Elm Grove; 50.8320°N 0.1279°W	Roman Catholic	II*	In the 1870s, a widow donated £10,000 of bonds to build a church on Elm Grove in memory of her husband and to replace a mission chapel there. It took 27 years to complete and cost £15,000. William Kedo Broder's design of 1880 was reduced in scope after his death the next year: a planned tower and spire were not built. Other architects made additions in 1885, 1901 and 1906, when the church opened in its present form. The tall, mostly Kentish Ragstone church has Bath Stone dressings and a green slate roof.
Church of the Sacred Heart (More images)		Hove; 50.8298°N 0.1709°W	Roman Catholic	II	Father George Oldham left money in his will to fund a chapel of ease to his church, St Mary Magdalen's. London-based John Crawley designed the first (eastern) section, but died just before the opening date of 28 September 1881; J.S. Hansom, who took over his architectural practice, extended the church at the western end, and it reopened in 1887. In the early 20th century a Lady chapel and presbytery were added on the north and south sides respectively.
St Mary's Church (More images)		Preston Park; 50.8447°N 0.1458°W	Roman Catholic	II	In 1903, the Sisters of Charity and Christian Instruction of Nevers established themselves in Withdean, then within the parish of St Joseph's. They acquired land close to Preston Park in 1907, and architect Percy Lamb started work on a new church for the area on 9 August 1910. St Mary's Church celebrated its first service in 1912. The building is of Kentish Ragstone and Bath Stone with a slate roof, and is in the Gothic style. A new sanctuary was added in 1978. The church was listed in June 2015.
St Mary Magdalen's Church (More images)		Montpelier; 50.8256°N 0.1496°W	Roman Catholic	II	Brighton's second oldest Roman Catholic church was partly opened in 1861 and completed in 1862. Gilbert Blount designed and built the church, which opened formally on 16 August 1864 after he extended the nave. The 13th-century Early English/Decorated Gothic-style building is mostly red-brick with stone dressings, and adjoins a presbytery and parish hall (originally a school). Services include a weekly Mass in Polish.
St Peter's Church (More images)		Aldrington; 50.8335°N 0.1849°W	Roman Catholic	II	The present church cost £9,000 and replaced the church hall, which had been used for worship, in 1915. Described by English Heritage as "startling" because of its tall campanile and its basilica-style prominence, the red-brick, slate-roofed church was reportedly designed by architects Claude and John Kelly, a father-and-son partnership. There are many marble interior decorations and fittings. The entrance, with a rose window above, is in the western end, next to the campanile.
Church of Our Lady of Lourdes, Queen of Peace (More images)		Rottingdean; 50.8056°N 0.0568°W	Roman Catholic	–	Built in 1957 by Sussex-born architect Henry Bingham Towner, the church—a modern interpretation of the Sussex style of Gothic architecture, of flint-covered brick with stone dressings—occupies an elevated position on the edge of Rottingdean. A stained glass west window was added in 2000. It was registered in August 1957.
St George's Church (More images)		West Blatchington; 50.8468°N 0.1837°W	Roman Catholic	–	A hall and the Grenadier Hotel in Hangleton were used for Roman Catholic worship until St George's was built to serve West Blatchington and Hangleton. The 1968 church was originally administered from St Peter's in Aldrington. High-quality interior decoration and stained glass were created by a former priest with art training. The church's registrations for worship and marriages date from April 1969.
St Patrick's Church (More images)		Woodingdean; 50.8276°N 0.0643°W	Roman Catholic	–	Designed by John Wells-Thorpe and opened in 1959 as an Anglican church (the Church of the Resurrection), this later became a Roman Catholic church, administered by the Church of Our Lady of Lourdes, Queen of Peace in Rottingdean. It was reregistered for Catholic worship in June 1970.
St Thomas More Church (More images)		Patcham; 50.8595°N 0.1423°W	Roman Catholic	–	Rapid residential development in Patcham justified the construction of this church in 1963. It was registered in June of that year. A proposed bell tower was proscribed because it might dominate the adjacent Anglican Church of Christ the King; but a timber geodesic dome was allowed, and a large steel cross was erected in 1991. The low, square building incorporates brick, concrete and large areas of glass, including some stained glass.
Holland Road Baptist Church (More images)		Hove; 50.8271°N 0.1614°W	Baptist	II	In 1887, a group of Christians who met at a gymnasium in Hove received funding to build their own church, which was designed by John Wills of Derby. The pale Purbeck stone western frontage and buttressed tower can be seen from the street, and there is a hammerbeam roof. The capacity of 700 has been augmented by an early 21st-century church hall.
New Life Christian Church (More images)		Aldrington; 50.8336°N 0.1838°W	Baptist	L	The Cliftonville Congregational Church donated land for a mission hall, which was planned in 1896 and built in 1900 of red brick and terracotta. Hove's first mayor laid the foundation stone. The hall, called Rutland Gospel Hall, was sold in the 1930s to fund the building of the Hounsom Memorial Church, but is now used by Baptists.
One Church Brighton (Florence Road Baptist Church) (More images)		Brighton; 50.8380°N 0.1356°W	Baptist	L	Architect George Baines designed this large, flint-built, Early English revival-style church near London Road railway station, which was built between 1894 and 1895. Many of the brick-faced lancet windows contain stained glass, and the church has a tower and a tall, narrow spire. It joined the Gloucester Place church in 2010 in a partnership called "One Church Brighton".
One Church Brighton (Gloucester Place Baptist Church) (More images)		Brighton; 50.8263°N 0.1359°W	Baptist	L	George Baines built this chapel in 1904 to replace the Queen Square Baptist Church, which had opened in 1857. The northern tower was cut down after it suffered bomb damage during World War II. It joined the Florence Road church in 2010 in a partnership called "One Church Brighton".
West Hill Baptist Chapel (More images)		West Hill; 50.8293°N 0.1452°W	Baptist	L	Charles Hewitt designed this red-brick chapel in 1894–96 as the Nathaniel Reformed Episcopal Church. It was registered for marriages in 1898, but was closed and deregistered in 1961. A Strict Baptist community displaced from Church Street in 1965 then acquired it, reregistering it that November and then for marriages in March 1977. It was shared briefly by the Ebenezer Reformed Baptist Church while their premises in Ivory Place were being rebuilt.
Ebenezer Reformed Baptist Church (More images)		Carlton Hill; 50.8267°N 0.1335°W	Baptist	–	This started in an 1825 Neo-Renaissance building which incorporated a school and dormitory for boarding pupils. This was demolished in 1965 and replaced by C.J. Wood's brick building, registered in April of that year. This was in turn demolished in 2007 and the site was redeveloped with affordable housing which incorporated a church at ground-floor level.
Kharis Church Brighton		Richmond Parade, Brighton, BN2 9AA 50.8265°N 0.1332°W	Non-denominational	–	This is a Christ-centred, and disciple-making church in the heart of Brighton. The church is full of joy and a great place to discover Christ and pursue a fulfilling life in God. This place is perfect for those seeking a spiritual home and to build their relationship with God. Sunday services start at 11:00 a.m. and Wednesday midweek services start at 19:00 p.m.
Portslade Baptist Church (More images)		Portslade; 50.8421°N 0.2192°W	Baptist	–	The church was built on South Street in 1961 to replace a large Gothic chapel of 1891 on Chapel Place, as a result of population movement between the two areas. It was registered in March of that year.
Brighthelm Church and Community Centre (More images)		Brighton; 50.8260°N 0.1419°W	United Reformed Church	L	This was opened in 1987 in the grounds of the Grade II-listed Hanover Chapel, which was built as an independent chapel in 1825, became the Brighton Presbyterian Church in 1847 and merged with the nearby Union Chapel's Congregational community when the latter closed in 1972. The chapel (image) is still part of the new church complex, which was registered for worship and for marriages in April 1989 and December 1990 respectively.
Central United Reformed Church (More images)		Hove; 50.8308°N 0.1723°W	United Reformed Church	L	Cliftonville and St Cuthbert's Churches merged in 1980 to form this church. Cliftonville, in central Hove, was built as a Congregational Church in 1867 by Horatio Nelson Goulty. It is a stone building in the Early English Gothic Revival style. St Cuthbert's was a Presbyterian church of 1911 in the Decorated Gothic style with terracotta dressings. The Central United Reformed Church moved into the Cliftonville church premises; the vacant St Cuthbert's Church was demolished in 1984.
Hounsom Memorial Church (More images)		Hangleton; 50.8443°N 0.1925°W	United Reformed Church	–	Founded in 1938 and opened in 1939 on the Hangleton estate, and financed by the sale of Rutland Gospel Hall, John Leopold Denman's 350-capacity building uses bricks and tiles from nearby Ringmer and has a tower topped by a figure of Saint Christopher. Under its original name of William Allin Hounsom Memorial Congregational Church it was registered for marriages in November 1939.
Lewes Road United Reformed Church (More images)		Brighton; 50.8397°N 0.1231°W	United Reformed Church	–	This modern building replaced the former Congregational church further north on Lewes Road—an Italian Gothic-style building designed by A. Harford. The new church was registered in September 1996.
Portslade United Reformed Church (More images)		Portslade; 50.8323°N 0.2081°W	United Reformed Church	–	Portslade's first Congregational church was a tin hall in 1875; services were also held on a barge anchored in nearby Shoreham Harbour. A flint church with red brick dressings was built in 1903, and was superseded by a new brick building with stone facings in 1932. This was built next to the original church, which then became the church hall.
St Martin's United Reformed Church (More images)		Saltdean; 50.8034°N 0.0336°W	United Reformed Church	–	The adjacent church hall was used for worship from 1949 (although it was registered in mid-1950). In 1957 Peter Winton-Lewis designed and built the present St Martin's Church for the Presbyterian community. Under the name St Martin's Presbyterian Church of England, it was registered in July 1957.
Calvary Evangelical Church (More images)		Round Hill; 50.8336°N 0.1380°W	Evangelical	L	This Early English-style Primitive Methodist chapel, built of yellow brick in 1876, later became the Brighton Railway Mission. It now houses an independent Evangelical congregation and, since 2006, the Brighton and Hove City Mission.
Christian Arabic Evangelical Church (More images)		Aldrington; 50.8379°N 0.2032°W	Evangelical	–	Situated on Old Shoreham Road, this converted bungalow was the Aldrington Evangelical Free Church from its founding in 1938 until the early 21st century. It has been extended several times.
New Life Church (More images)		Moulsecoomb; 50.8540°N 0.1076°W	Evangelical	–	The original St George's Hall, a chapel of ease to St Andrew's Church, was built in North Moulsecoomb in May 1930. It later fell out of religious use but continued as a community facility. The hall was rebuilt in 1989 and retained its old name. An Evangelical congregation now uses the building as its place of worship.
Park Hill Evangelical Church (More images)		Queen's Park; 50.8233°N 0.1280°W	Evangelical	–	Herbert Buckwell built this church in 1894 as a Presbyterian church, St Andrew's. It became the Park Hill Evangelical Church in 1943, being registered for worship (with the name Evangelical Free Church) in December of that year and for marriages ten months later.
Southern Cross Evangelical Church (More images)		Southern Cross; 50.8376°N 0.2166°W	Evangelical	–	The present white-painted brick church of 1907 replaced an iron hut of 1890. The 250-capacity building, in the southwestern part of Portslade, took its present name in 1967.
Hove Methodist Church (More images)		Hove; 50.8328°N 0.1792°W	Methodist	II	Designed and built in 1895 by architect John Wills in a Romanesque Revival style in red brick with white stone facings and dressings, this church features a large rose window in the south face. Below this, a porch with twin pointed roofs and multi-coloured glass is a later addition. The interior fittings still reflect their 19th-century origins. A wooden gallery runs below the hammerbeam roof.
Stanford Avenue Methodist Church (More images)		Preston Park; 50.8408°N 0.1371°W	Methodist	L	E.J. Hamilton, also responsible for a former Methodist church in Hove and the original Salvation Army citadel in Brighton, built this church in the Early English revival style between 1897 and 1898. The red-brick, stone-faced building has lancet windows and a small spire.
Dorset Gardens Methodist Church (More images)		East Cliff; 50.8213°N 0.1340°W	Methodist	–	The 2003 building is the third Methodist church to stand on this site. Its forerunners were Brighton's first Methodist church, built in 1808, and a completely rebuilt successor from 1884. The latter was extended in 1929, greatly increasing its capacity, and had an Italianate tower. The new brick, concrete and red tile church cost £1.6 million. It retains its original registration for marriages, which dates from August 1895, and a worship registration from December 1947 when the old chapel was formally recertified.
Patcham Methodist Church (More images)		Patcham; 50.8640°N 0.1444°W	Methodist	–	A 16th-century barn built of wood (supposedly from a shipwrecked Spanish Armada vessel) and flint was used as a church between 1935 and 1968, when the present church was built on its site. It was registered in February 1969.
Woodingdean Methodist Church (More images)		Woodingdean; 50.8299°N 0.0700°W	Methodist	–	This church was opened on a main road in the Woodingdean estate in 1953 and was registered in August of that year. Its marriage registration dates from May 1956. In 1986 it was substantially extended.
Brighton and Hove Hebrew Congregation Synagogue (More images)		Hove; 50.8301°N 0.1826°W	Jewish (Ashkenazi)	–	The Ashkenazi community bought two houses on New Church Road in the 1930s and engaged William Willett to build a synagogue in the grounds in 1955. It was started during Hanukkah in 1958 and consecrated three years later, although it became a registered place of worship in December 1959. The former Middle Street Synagogue is also owned by the congregation.
Brighton and Hove Reform Synagogue (More images)		Hove; 50.8296°N 0.1627°W	Jewish (Movement for Reform Judaism)	II	Part of the Movement for Reform Judaism, this synagogue was founded in 1967 to serve a rapidly growing community. The 400-capacity building was designed by Derek Sharp and was built on land donated by Lord (Lewis) Cohen of Brighton. A plaque indicates that the foundation stone was laid on 17 July 1966, or in the Hebrew calendar, 29 Tammuz 5726. It was formally registered for worship in July 1982. Originally a locally listed building, it was granted Grade II listed status in April 2025.
Brighton and Hove Progressive Synagogue (More images)		Hove; 50.8276°N 0.1589°W	Jewish (Liberal Judaism)	–	The local Progressive Jewish community was founded in 1935, and worshipped in private houses until it acquired and rebuilt a gymnasium on Lansdowne Road in 1937. This was consecrated in 1938, rebuilt in 1949 and given its current name in 1976. Edward Lewis designed the synagogue in the International style.
Al-Madina Mosque (More images)		Brighton; 50.8239°N 0.1541°W	Muslim	–	The city has no purpose-built mosques, but this converted house in Bedford Place, on the Brighton/Hove border, is one of two former houses that now serve as mosques.
Al-Quds Mosque (More images)		Prestonville; 50.8347°N 0.1508°W	Muslim	–	This mosque is on Dyke Road in Brighton, opposite Brighton Hove & Sussex Sixth Form College. A group of Muslims who were visiting Brighton and Hove in the 1970s donated money to fund an Islamic centre and mosque. The community bought a converted house, formerly a nursery. Under the name Brighton Islamic Centre and Mosque it was registered for worship in February 1983.
Shahjalal Muslim Cultural Centre (More images)		Aldrington; 50.8338°N 0.1904°W	Muslim	–	Once used by the Foresters Friendly Society, this building on Portland Road has been converted into a mosque and Muslim community centre. When the proposal was announced in September 1998, the council asked for a buzzer system to be used instead of an amplified adhan. They then granted permission in 2005 for extra Friday meetings.
Emmanuel (at Oasis) (More images)		Hangleton; 50.8479°N 0.2010°W	Non-denominational	–	Although described as an evangelical group, the Fellowship is part of the Baptist Union of Great Britain as well as the Evangelical Alliance. Since 1998 it has occupied this steep-roofed church, which opened in 1957 and was associated with the Holland Road Baptist Church. Oasis became a site of Emmanuel in 2019, with the transfer of the building into their ownership in 2020. Emmanuel have five locations in the city of Brighton and Hove and at Shoreham-by-Sea. Under the name Hangleton Valley Free Church (Baptist), the church was registered for worship and marriages in July 1958 and April 1962 respectively.
Emmanuel (at The Clarendon Centre) (More images)		New England Quarter; 50.8324°N 0.1399°W	Non-denominational	–	This is a non-denominational church affiliated with Newfrontiers based at the Clarendon Centre near Brighton railway station. Purchased in 1992, the converted electrical warehouse has housed the congregation (founded in 1978 as the Brighton & Hove Christian Fellowship, with assistance from Newfrontiers leader Terry Virgo) since May 1993. Since 2011 it has been part of the Emmanuel network of multi-site church, meeting in five locations around the city and in Shoreham-by-Sea. The building was registered in July 1995.
Emmanuel (at The Villas) (More images)		Hove; 50.8321°N 0.1741°W	Non-denominational	–	Originally known as Clarendon Mission, Thomas Simpson's late-19th-century undenominational mission chapel, in yellow and red brick and with some terracotta dressings and a large porch with columns, was bought by an Evangelical group in 1961. Brighton & Hove Christian Fellowship took on the building in June 1979, changing their name to Clarendon Church. Retaining the building, they moved their services to the Clarendon Centre in the New England Quarter in 1993, changing their name again to Church of Christ the King. Weekly services re-commenced at this venue in September 2013. Since then they have changed their name to Emmanuel and now meet in 5 locations around Brighton & Hove and Shoreham
Bevendean Community Church (More images)		Bevendean; 50.8420°N 0.0941°W	Salvation Army	–	Army halls in Moulsecoomb and Kemptown were closed in the 1950s and 1960s respectively; but in March 1970 the Salvation Army licensed the former Lower Bevendean Evangelical Free Church (opened in 1959) as the base for the Brighton Bevendean Corps.
Brighton Salvation Army Citadel (More images)		Round Hill; 50.8324°N 0.1332°W	Salvation Army	–	E.J. Hamilton's 1883 Congress Hall, in grey brick and terracotta-dressed stone with towers and battlemented parapets, was opened by Catherine Booth, the wife of the Army's founder. Its poor condition led to its demolition in 2000; the 200 members moved to the nearby Preston Barracks until architect David Greenwood's new octagonal citadel was built. The public were encouraged to donate by "buying a brick".
Hove Salvation Army Citadel (More images)		Hove; 50.8357°N 0.1771°W	Salvation Army	–	The Army have been established in Hove since 1882, at a Hall in Conway Street, near Hove station. The building was founded in 1890 and has a large, mostly blank western face fronting Sackville Road.
Rudyard Hall (More images)		Woodingdean; 50.8355°N 0.0663°W	Brethren	–	This building on Rudyard Road was registered as a Brethren place of worship in January 1952.
Bodhisattva Mahayna Buddhist Centre (More images)		Hove; 50.8274°N 0.1565°W	Buddhist (New Kadampa Tradition)	II	A Buddhist group raised money for two years to move their cultural centre and place of worship from Vernon Terrace to the former St Anne's Convent, an early-19th-century Classical/Greek Revival building originally called Wick Lodge. The three-bay convent chapel was converted into worship space for the 25 residents and visitors. A wide altar and Buddha figure sit alongside an original stained glass window of the Virgin and Child.
Brighton Buddhist Centre (More images)		North Laine; 50.8251°N 0.1400°W	Buddhist (Triratna Buddhist Community)	–	This is part of the Triratna Buddhist Community, founded in 1967, which has centres throughout the world. Before moving to this centrally located building, the community was based above a shop in Kemptown, where they became established in 1974.
Kingdom Hall (More images)		Aldrington; 50.8333°N 0.1878°W	Jehovah's Witnesses	–	This is located on Reynolds Road in the Aldrington area of Hove, on the site of a Kingdom Hall built in 1950 and demolished in 1999. It is used by the Hove and Portslade Congregations of Jehovah's Witnesses. The present building retains its original registrations for worship (in October 1959) and marriages (March 1961).
Kingdom Hall (More images)		Woodingdean; 50.8347°N 0.0872°W	Jehovah's Witnesses	–	The low, brick-built structure with a tiled roof is on Warren Road on the Woodingdean estate. It was registered for worship and marriages in April 1994, replacing a building on Bernard Road which had been used since 1954. It is used by three Brighton-based Congregations of Jehovah's Witnesses: East, Elm Grove and Woodingdean.
Brighton and Hove National Spiritualist Church (More images)		Carlton Hill; 50.8223°N 0.1313°W	Spiritualist	L	This mid-1960s building is a distinctive, curvaceous design by the architectural firm Overton and Partners. It replaced a chapel on nearby Mighell Street, built in 1878, which had been used by Baptists until the 1920s and Spiritualists thereafter. The new church was registered for worship in May 1965 and for marriages the following month.
Brotherhood Gate Spiritualist Church		Kemptown; 50.8211°N 0.1342°W	Spiritualist	–	This church, set behind St James's Street, was originally registered for worship as Brotherhood Gate Associate Church between July 1939 and November 1969, at which point it was reregistered under its new name and was also licensed for marriages. It is associated with the Spiritualists' National Union.
Brighton Baháʼí Centre (More images)		Preston Park; 50.8387°N 0.1406°W	Baháʼí Faith	–	A house on Stanford Avenue was converted into a place of worship for adherents of the Baháʼí Faith and was registered in 2002. The ground floor of the building has since been reregistered for the same purpose. The centre is used for worship, study groups and education.
First Church of Christ, Scientist (More images)		Montpelier; 50.8261°N 0.1519°W	Christian Scientist	L	Originally a house, the building is contemporary with other mid-19th-century buildings on Montpelier Road. In 1921 Clayton & Black converted it into a church; it was extended to the south and topped with an intricately carved pediment.
Oxford Street Chapel (More images)		Brighton; 50.8310°N 0.1354°W	Church of Christ	L	This small, stuccoed chapel in the Renaissance style was built in 1890 by architect Parker Anscombe. It has been used by a Church of Christ congregation since the late 1910s, and was registered for marriages in their name in August 1924.
St Mary and St Abraam Church (More images)		Hove; 50.8311°N 0.1558°W	Coptic Orthodox Church	–	One of 23 Coptic Orthodox churches in the United Kingdom, this congregation is based in the former Anglican church of St Thomas the Apostle, declared redundant in 1993. The red-brick church, built by Clayton & Black between 1909 and 1914, is in the Early English style. The Coptic Orthodox Church bought the building, and its leader Pope Shenouda III travelled to Hove for a dedication ceremony on 23 September 1994; it was then registered for worship and marriages ten months later.
Fountain Centre (Immanuel Family Church) (More images)		Patcham; 50.8590°N 0.1424°W	Elim Pentecostal	L	The Church of Christ the King, the Anglican parish church of South Patcham, was built in 1958 and declared redundant in 2006. An Elim congregation who had been displaced from their demolished former church in Balfour Road (built in 1939) now use it. They joined another congregation whose church in Hanover had been destroyed by fire.
Church of the Holy Trinity (More images)		Carlton Hill; 50.8240°N 0.1314°W	Greek Orthodox	II	The church opened in 1840 as St John the Evangelist's, an Anglican church for the impoverished Carlton Hill area. It was bought by the Greek Orthodox community after being declared redundant and closed; they registered it in August 1994. An arson attack in July 2010 caused significant damage.
Shree Swaminarayan Mandir (More images)		Southern Cross; 50.8369°N 0.2163°W	Hindu (Swaminarayan Sampradaya)	–	This was the first Hindu temple south of London when it opened on 18 September 1999 after an elaborate blessing ceremony. Previously, worshippers met in a church hall in Kemptown. The Swaminarayan Sampraday community paid £150,000 for the 19th-century former shop and social club and spent a further £50,000 converting it. Additions include much internal artwork, a flagpole and a kalasha-shaped finial.
City Coast Church (More images)		Portslade; 50.8309°N 0.2099°W	International Network of Churches	–	The Christian Outreach Centre movement, founded in Australia in 1974 and now known as the International Network of Churches, established its first European church at Newtown Road in Hove in 1993. Within 12 months, 350 people were attending services. In November 1999 the church moved to a modern building in Portslade.
Church of Jesus Christ of Latter-day Saints (More images)		Hollingdean; 50.8380°N 0.1245°W	Latter-day Saint	–	The Brighton congregation of The Church of Jesus Christ of Latter-day Saints worship at this church on the Lewes Road. It was registered in August 1993.
Oratory of St Cuthman and St Wilfrid (More images)		Round Hill; 50.8321°N 0.1334°W	Old Roman Catholic Church in Europe	–	The Annexe Sanctuary, a building associated with The Salvation Army's Brighton Congress Hall at Park Crescent, is used for the celebration of Mass by this Latin Church congregation. It serves the whole of southeast England.
Brighton Friends Meeting House (More images)		The Lanes; 50.8219°N 0.1414°W	Quaker	II	Brighton's Quaker community sold their former meeting house (a converted malthouse), used since 1690, and bought land on Ship Street to build a new one. Completed in 1805 and extended in 1845 and 1876–77 (by Clayton & Black, whose work included refacing the meeting house and building an adult school), the mostly red-brick building has been described as having "all the hallmarks of nonconformist architecture".
Galeed Strict Baptist Chapel (More images)		North Laine; 50.8273°N 0.1410°W	Strict Baptist	L	Benjamin Nunn designed this simple Neoclassical chapel in 1868. Its stuccoed south-facing frontage has three evenly-spaced doors and three first-floor windows above them. An inscription below the pediment reads galeed a.d. 1868. The original plain interior remains. The church is aligned with the Gospel Standard movement.
Brighton Unitarian Church (More images)		Brighton; 50.8239°N 0.1395°W	Unitarian	II	One of Brighton-based architect Amon Henry Wilds's first commissions, this stuccoed Greek Revival chapel with a gigantic tetrastyle portico was built in 1820 on land sold by the Prince Regent. Brighton's Unitarian community, formed after a split in the Calvinist community in 1791, have worshipped there ever since.

== Former places of worship ==
Former places of worship
Name	Image	Location	Denomination	Grade	Notes
St Andrew's Church (More images)		Brunswick Town; 50.8235°N 0.1571°W	Anglican	I	The Brunswick estate's church was declared redundant on 14 February 1990 because of declining attendances, and is now owned by the Churches Conservation Trust. It was originally a proprietary chapel owned by Rev. Edward Everard, who owned land on the estate's boundary. Construction work, based on Charles Barry's design, started in April 1827. The exterior was the first example in England of the Italianate style, although the interior was less grand.
St Peter's Church (More images)		Preston Village; 50.8423°N 0.1495°W	Anglican	II*	Now owned by the Churches Conservation Trust, the ancient parish church of Preston Village is mostly 13th-century, although it was restored in the 1870s and in 1906 after a serious fire. The flint and stone building, in Early English style, has a chancel, nave, porch, vestry and a shallow-capped tower at the west end.
St Stephen's Church (More images)		Montpelier; 50.8266°N 0.1531°W	Anglican	II*	Originally built as the ballroom of the Castle Inn in 1766 by John Crunden, the building became the Royal Pavilion's chapel in 1821. It was moved to Montpelier Road in 1850 and became St Stephen's Church. The Neoclassical building was converted into a day centre for homeless people in the 1970s.
Holy Trinity Church (More images)		The Lanes; 50.8228°N 0.1420°W	Anglican	II	Amon Wilds built a Greek Doric-style chapel in 1817 for an independent Christian sect founded by prominent local resident Thomas Read Kemp. It was reconsecrated as an Anglican church in 1829. Rev. Frederick W. Robertson achieved national fame for his radical, unorthodox sermons in the mid-19th century, and the church was popular with Brighton's high society. It was rebuilt in the 1880s in the Gothic Revival style with a tall octagonal tower and knapped flint walls. The church closed in 1984 and is now an art gallery.
Holy Trinity Church (More images)		Hove; 50.8312°N 0.1719°W	Anglican	II	The mid-19th century growth of Hove meant that St Andrew's Church was often full. One of its curates planned a new church nearby, and the site for what became the Holy Trinity Church was bought in 1861. James Woodman designed it in a style which, although broadly Gothic, has been interpreted in many different ways. The church had a rare external pulpit. Declining attendances caused it to close in 2007. The building was converted to a medical centre in 2017.
St Augustine's Church (More images)		Preston Park; 50.8383°N 0.1400°W	Anglican	II	Started in 1896 by G. Streatfield and extended by him in 1914 with guidance from Thomas Graham Jackson, this Perpendicular-style, red-brick church has a 5 1/2-bay nave, apse, chancel and Lady chapel. The parish absorbed that of St Saviour's Church, which closed in 1981, but St Augustine's itself closed in 2002.
St Mark's Church (More images)		Kemptown; 50.8176°N 0.1120°W	Anglican	II	This roughcast church, built between 1838 and 1849 for the Marquess of Bristol, was Kemptown's parish church between 1873 and 1986, when it was declared redundant and given to St Mary's Hall, an adjacent girls' school. It has become the school's chapel and concert hall.
St Wilfrid's Church (More images)		Elm Grove; 50.8317°N 0.1210°W	Anglican	II	Harry Goodhart-Rendel's church, built between 1932 and 1934, replaced an iron building of 1901. Sir John Betjeman considered the architecturally Eclectic brick building "about the best 1930s church there is", but it had to be closed in 1980 when blue asbestos was found. It has been converted into a housing complex.
Stanmer Church (More images)		Stanmer; 50.8703°N 0.1019°W	Anglican	II	The former Brighton Corporation bought the Stanmer Estate from the Earls of Chichester after the Second World War. The third Earl rebuilt a 13th-century church in 1838. Declared redundant in 2008, it stands in the extensive Stanmer Park, Brighton and Hove's largest area of parkland.
Beulah Mission Hall (More images)		Southern Cross; 50.8384°N 0.2161°W	Anglican	–	This small mission hall adjoins a house which retains the name Beulah Cottage. Built in about 1905 and now used as a garage, the painted red-brick building still has lancet windows.
Bute Mission Hall (More images)		Queen's Park; 50.8243°N 0.1197°W	Anglican	–	The former St Matthew's Church, built on Sutherland Road in 1881, established this mission chapel on the same road in 1893. W.H. Nash's red-brick structure now houses a carpet showroom.
Church of the Holy Nativity (More images)		Bevendean; 50.8431°N 0.0993°W	Anglican	–	Between 1953 and 1963, an old barn served as the Bevendean estate's chapel, until architect Reginald Melhuish built a new church in a distinctive Modern style. Consisting of brick and knapped flint, its roof slopes down and sweeps up again to a sharp point. It closed in 2007 and was converted into a community centre.
St Agnes' Church (More images)		Hove; 50.8368°N 0.1731°W	Anglican	–	This is a red-brick and stone building of 1913, to which a porch and aisle were added in 1930. The Diocese of Chichester declared the church, near Hove railway station, redundant in 1977, and although proposed for demolition, it was later converted into a gymnasium.
St Richard of Chichester's Church (More images)		Hollingdean; 50.8431°N 0.1268°W	Anglican	–	Part of the parish and benefice of St Matthias, Hollingdean's church was built as a chapel of ease to St Matthias Church in 1954. Local architectural firm Clayton, Black and Daviel were responsible for the small brick building. It was closed for worship in October 2013.
Bristol Road Methodist Church (More images)		Kemptown; 50.8196°N 0.1245°W	Methodist	II	Thomas Lainson's Romanesque Revival church of 1873, built on a corner site on Bristol Road with a timber-framed roof and small spire, was closed in 1989 and converted into a recording studio.
Goldstone Villas Methodist Church (More images)		Hove; 50.8324°N 0.1723°W	Methodist	L	Hove's Primitive Methodist community was founded in 1876, and had established their own chapel within two years. Membership declined in the 20th century and it closed in 1933, one year after the Methodist Union. The Renaissance-style building was converted into offices in 1968 after a period spent in the ownership of a Christadelphian community, who registered it as Cliftonville Hall in July 1964.
Queen's Park Methodist Church (More images)		Queen's Park; 50.8257°N 0.1272°W	Methodist	L	Architect W.S. Parnacott designed this church, which stood on Queen's Park Road south of St Luke's Church. It opened in September 1891 and held its final service in 1987. It has since been converted into a nursery school.
United Methodist Church (More images)		Hove; 50.8342°N 0.1547°W	Methodist	L	A long-established Bible Christian community founded this church, which was built in the Early English style in 1904 and opened in 1905. The 400-capacity building did not thrive, closed in 1947 and was sold to the Grace Eyre Foundation, an organisation for adults with learning disabilities. Its marriage registration was cancelled in October 1950.
Franklin Road Methodist Church (More images)		Portslade; 50.8334°N 0.2084°W	Methodist	–	Portslade's Wesleyan Methodist congregation met in public rooms in the area, including above the Clarence Club, until Messrs Gillam of Southwick built a church in 1907. A Sunday School was added in 1930, but it closed in 1964 and is now in commercial use.
Gordon Mission Hall (More images)		Kemptown; 50.8217°N 0.1321°W	Methodist	–	Three denominations have used this Gothic Revival chapel, built by W.S. Parnacott in 1886, but it is now in residential use. Primitive Methodists occupied it until 1937, then an Open Brethren assembly (as High Street Chapel) used it until September 1979. The Greek Orthodox community then took it on, and it was registered as the Greek Orthodox Church of the Holy Trinity from January 1980 until August 1994, when the new church of that name replaced it.
Hollingbury Methodist Church (More images)		Hollingbury; 50.8597°N 0.1327°W	Methodist	–	This small brick building opened in September 1952, was registered for worship the following month and was granted a marriage registration in December 1964. It closed in August 2010 and the congregation moved to other Methodist churches; its marriage registration was cancelled in October 2012. The building is now used as a nursery school.
London Road Methodist Church (More images)		Brighton; 50.8325°N 0.1372°W	Methodist	–	Used for worship until 2006, this Free Renaissance-style building by James Weir friba dates from 1894. Red brick, terracotta and stone are all visible, but the façade was hidden behind cement in 1938 during a major rebuilding. The church had been extended in 1910, including a tower and spire which are no longer in place. Its marriage registration was cancelled in July 2006. The building later housed the Emporium Theatre and café, but fell out of use again in 2016. A planning application to convert the building into a board gaming café was raised in early 2020.
Clarence Baptist Chapel		Brighton; 50.8236°N 0.1487°W	Baptist	–	This stuccoed Classical-style chapel dates from 1833. After passing out of religious use, it was converted into a school and then (in the late 1940s) a theatre. At first named Studio Theatre, it is now known as Brighton Little Theatre.
Islingword Road Baptist Mission		Hanover; 50.8310°N 0.1275°W	Baptist	–	Used by Baptists before it closed in the early 20th century, this small chapel (now converted into two houses and recognisable only by the small pediment below the roofline) has also been used by Primitive Methodists and an Evangelical congregation. The rendered building dates from 1881 and was registered for marriages in February 1929.
Jireh Strict Baptist Chapel		North Laine; 50.8263°N 0.1377°W	Baptist	–	This Regency-style chapel originally had two storeys; a third was added after it passed into secular use in about 1902. The stuccoed building has pilasters on the façade.
Queen Square Baptist Chapel		Brighton; 50.8246°N 0.1437°W	Baptist	–	This chapel was used by Baptists between 1856 and 1908, and by the Free Church for another 40 years. Since then it has been in commercial use. It is in the Neoclassical style, with three bays, pilasters and a parapet.
Sudeley Place Congregational Chapel (More images)		Kemptown; 50.8179°N 0.1171°W	Congregational	L	Rev. John Nelson Goulty founded this church in 1868. The present building, a Renaissance-style structure of 1891, was used until about 1918, after which it became a cinema—originally the Kings Cliff cinema and later the Continentale. It was converted for residential use after its closure in 1984.
Trinity Independent Congregational Chapel (More images)		North Laine; 50.8241°N 0.1383°W	Congregational	L	Founded as Mr Faithfull's Chapel, which moved from Ship Street, this mid-1820s Neoclassical church by Thomas Cooper also bore the name Pavilion Baptist Chapel before its closure in about 1896. Subsequent uses have included Brighton's music library (until 2003) and an arts venue.
Belgrave Street Congregational Church (More images)		Hanover; 50.8289°N 0.1304°W	Congregational	–	Thomas Simpson's stuccoed Early English-style chapel was in use by the Congregational community from 1865 until 1939 or 1942. Afterwards, it became part of Brighton Technical College (now known as City College Brighton & Hove).
Rottingdean Congregational Chapel (More images)		Rottingdean; 50.8042°N 0.0581°W	Congregational	–	The village of Rottingdean was provided with a small Congregational Chapel in the 1890s. The stuccoed building, with arched windows, closed in the 1980s after a period as an independent chapel, and is now a shop.
Roof-top synagogue		Brunswick Town; 50.8236°N 0.1607°W	Jewish (Orthodox) (breakaway)	I	This is a private synagogue built on the roof of the home of Philip Salomons, consisting of a small octagonal edifice on top of a highly glazed room – in reference to the Dome of the Rock in Jerusalem – on the sun terrace of his then private residence. It was the subject of acrimonious debate between Salomons and members of the Middle Street Synagogue, Brighton, since private synagogues violated the Laws of the Congregation. For a time after his death it was turned into a Jewish history museum. It is now part of a privately let apartment.
Middle Street Synagogue (More images)		The Lanes; 50.8211°N 0.1428°W	Jewish (Orthodox)	II*	Thomas Lainson's 1874 building in yellow and brown Sussex brick replaced an earlier synagogue on which David Mocatta had worked. The 300-capacity building has an unusually opulent interior, partly funded by the Sassoon family, but high maintenance costs and the existence of three other synagogues in the city led to its closure in 2004.
Brighton Regency Synagogue (More images)		Kemptown; 50.8213°N 0.1309°W	Jewish (Orthodox)	II	David Mocatta built Brighton's first synagogue here in 1826 and extended it in 1837. The 50-capacity Regency style building has a pediment, large three-storey pilasters and an entablature bearing the legend jews synagogue am 5598. After the Middle Street Synagogue opened, it was sold for commercial use, and is now residential.
Hove Hebrew Congregation Synagogue (More images)		Hove; 50.8281°N 0.1610°W	Jewish (Ashkenazi)	L	Chief Rabbi Joseph Hertz laid the first stone of this synagogue, built between 1929 and 1930 by M.K. Glass in a style reminiscent of the Jugendstil movement, similar to Art Nouveau. It follows the Ashkenazi tradition. Closed in September 2023.
Union Chapel (More images)		The Lanes; 50.8223°N 0.1410°W	Elim Pentecostal	II	Brighton's first Nonconformist place of worship opened on this site in Union Street in the late 17th century. It became an Independent chapel and then the Union Free Church (founded by the merger of two Congregational churches) in the 19th century; in 1905 it became a missionary church for miners; and in 1927 it became the Elim Church. It is now a pub.
Elim Community Church (More images)		Aldrington; 50.8343°N 0.1919°W	Elim Pentecostal	–	The most notable architectural feature of this small 1929 chapel on Portland Road is its Diocletian window. The red-brick building is clad in painted render. It became a nursery school after the congregation moved out in 1994. Latterly known as the Elim Community Church, its marriage registration was cancelled in January 1998.
Clermont Church (More images)		Preston Village; 50.8442°N 0.1539°W	United Reformed Church	L	J.G. Gibbins designed this chapel for Congregationalists in 1877–78. It became the Clermont United Reformed Church, then the Brightwaves Metropolitan Community Church—a fellowship of liberal Christian congregations associated with LGBT communities. Latterly it was used ad hoc by the Traditional Church of England denomination, who rededicated it to St Charles, King and Martyr; but in 2015 a planning application for residential conversion was submitted, which stated that regular use ceased c. 2006. The application was approved in July 2016; six flats will be built inside, but the exterior appearance will be preserved.
Lewes Road United Reformed Church (More images)		Brighton; 50.8359°N 0.1257°W	United Reformed Church	–	Architect A. Harford designed this building in the Italian Gothic style for the Congregational Church in 1878. It became a United Reformed Church when that entity was formed in 1972, but was later closed and replaced with a new building further down Lewes Road. The façade has been retained, and the building has been converted into 31 self-catering apartments for formerly homeless people. The facility is supported by the Brighton branch of the YMCA.
Emmanuel Full Gospel Church (More images)		Elm Grove; 50.8320°N 0.1258°W	Assemblies of God	–	This small Vernacular-style chapel has stood on De Montfort Road in Hanover since 1932. It was registered as a Pentecostal place of worship for the Assemblies of God denomination.
Mile Oak Gospel Hall (More images)		Mile Oak; 50.8510°N 0.2280°W	Churches of God	–	Adherents of the Churches of God (Needed Truth Brethren) movement sold their former premises Bampfield Hall in Portslade—originally a Primitive Methodist chapel—in the 1960s to fund this new church. It opened in 1966 and was registered in March of that year The premises were sold in the 2010s and became the Brighton Wellness Centre.
City Gate Church		Brighton; 50.8327°N 0.1376°W	Evangelical	–	This Evangelical group was founded in 1981 and is part of the Pioneer Network of Churches. Worship takes place private houses and previously also at a converted building on London Road, which was registered for worship and marriages between 1994 and 2014.
Bentham Road Mission Hall (More images)		Hanover; 50.8302°N 0.1231°W	Free Church	–	This small hall is now boarded-up and derelict, but was still in use as late as the mid-1980s. The rendered exterior still shows evidence of its former lancet windows. The building dates from 1881.
Kingdom Hall (More images)		Seven Dials; 50.8297°N 0.1522°W	Jehovah's Witnesses	–	This Kingdom Hall was situated in a converted building on Osmond Road on the border of Brighton and Hove. It was registered for worship in May 1975 and for solemnising marriages in March 1985, and until its closure was used by the Brighton, Central and Brighton, Patcham Congregations of Jehovah's Witnesses.
Church of Jesus Christ of Latter Day Saints (More images)		Coldean; 50.8577°N 0.1075°W	Latter-Day Saint	–	Brighton's Latter-day Saints community worshipped at this church in the 1950s Coldean housing estate until its closure in 1993 and the opening of a new building on Lewes Road. It was registered for worship in February 1954 and for marriages in November 1955, although one source gives 1963 as the date it started. Demolition was proposed in 2020.
Park Road Hall		Rottingdean; 50.8039°N 0.0582°W	Non-denominational	L	This locally listed building is now used as a Montessori school and for community purposes, but was previously registered for a Christian fellowship in June 1954.
Goldstone Valley Gospel Hall (More images)		West Blatchington; 50.8489°N 0.1810°W	Open Brethren	–	Edward Avenue, on which this Gospel hall stands, was developed in the late 1950s. When originally registered as a place of worship in August 1967, its name was simply The Room. As of 2011, services were held on Wednesdays and Sundays. The building was sold at auction in May 2020, having fallen out of religious use.
L'Eglise Française Reformée (More images)		Brighton; 50.8220°N 0.1495°W	Reformed Church of France	L	The only French Protestant church in Britain outside London is located just off Brighton seafront next to the Metropole Hotel. The small red-brick church was built in 1887 for £1,535 (£174,500 as of 2025) to serve local and itinerant Francophone worshippers (mostly fishermen from France). Brighton's Francophone community has declined from its early-20th century peak, and in June 2008 it was announced that the church would close and be sold. The final service was on 26 July 2008.
Salvation Army Citadel (More images)		Portslade; 50.8311°N 0.2135°W	Salvation Army	–	Meetings took place above a shop from 1882, but this citadel was in use between 1910 and 1966, after which it was sold and converted for commercial use. The Renaissance-style red-brick building has a staggered gable and stuccoed dressings. Its registrations for worship and marriages were cancelled in June 1971.
Seventh Day Adventist Church (More images)		Hove; 50.8256°N 0.1748°W	Seventh-day Adventist	–	This tiny brick cottage, with a tile-hung upper floor and gabled roof, was the coach house of an adjacent villa until Hove's Seventh-day Adventist congregation acquired it in the 1930s. Previously they had met above a shop. The building was registered for marriages in July 1936.
Dependants' Chapel (More images)		Aldrington; 50.8361°N 0.1872°W	Society of Dependants	–	This was one of seven chapels built for John Sirgood's local sect, nicknamed "Cokelers". It opened as a mission hall in 1905 and was converted into a house at the end of the 1970s.
Chapel of the Holy Family (More images)		Hollingdean; 50.8425°N 0.1302°W	Roman Catholic (Society of St. Pius X)	–	This chapel is one of twenty-four in Britain that belongs to the Society of St. Pius X, a Traditionalist Catholic group which opposes the changes introduced in the Second Vatican Council. Two or three services are held monthly.
Brighton and Hove Central Spiritualist Church		Montpelier; 50.8258°N 0.1549°W	Spiritualist	–	Between 1966 and 1980, the community met in a room in a building in nearby Norfolk Terrace. Their new place of worship, a building on Boundary Passage (a twitten straddling the Brighton and Hove parish boundaries), was registered for worship and marriages in April 1984. The last service was held on 23 November 2019, after which the congregation joined the Spiritualist church on Edward Street to form the new Brighton and Hove National Spiritualist Church in the latter building.

== See also ==
- Buildings and architecture of Brighton and Hove
- List of demolished places of worship in Brighton and Hove
- Media related to Places of worship in Brighton and Hove at Wikimedia Commons
