= Hounsom Memorial United Reformed Church, Hove =

Hounsom Memorial Church
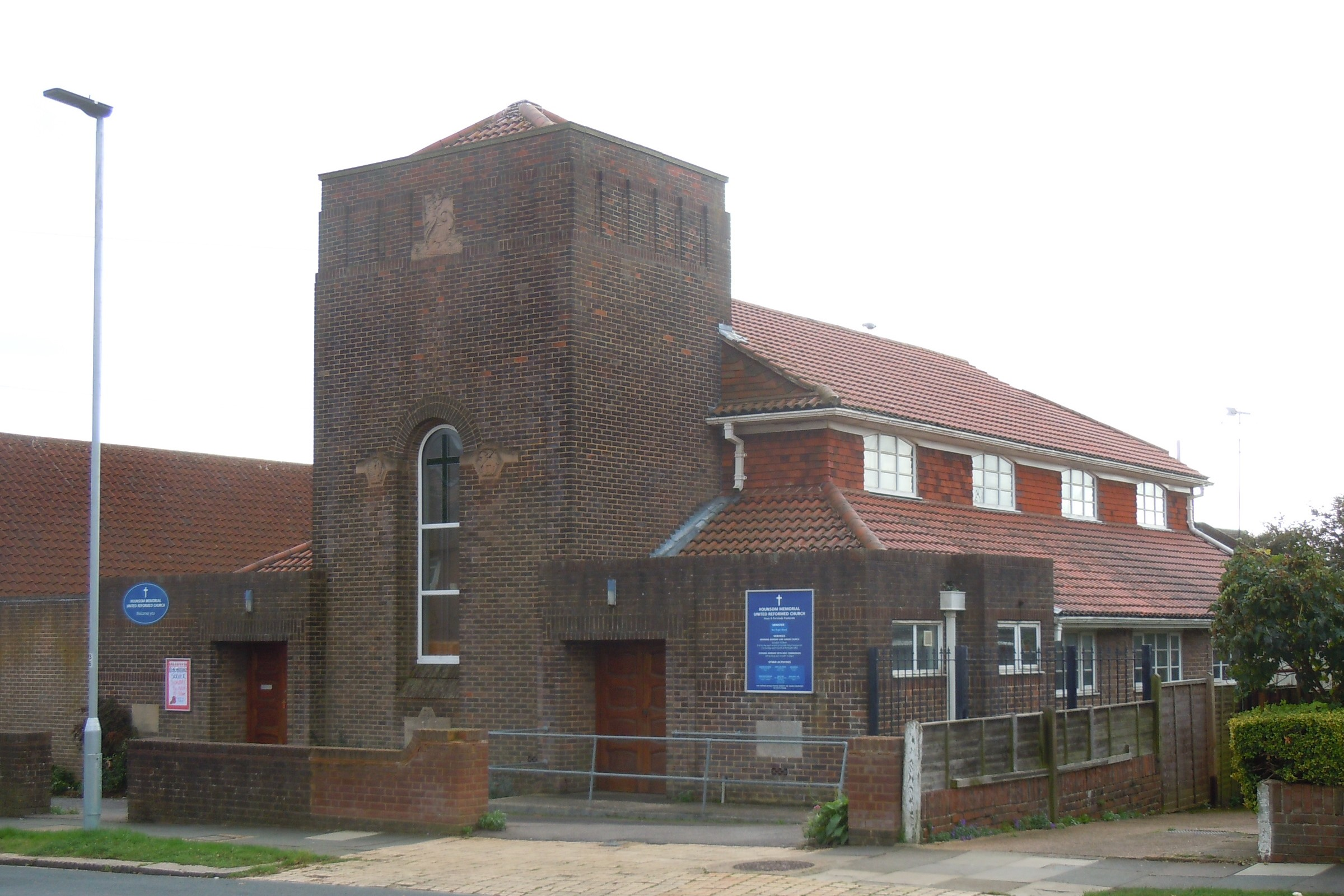
- The church from the northwest

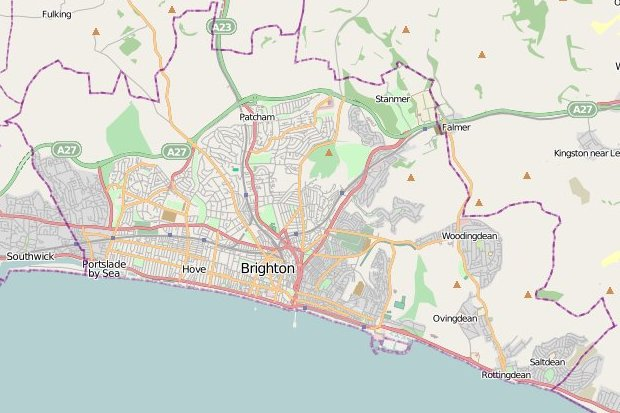
- Location within Brighton and Hove
- 50.8443°N 0.1925°W
- OS grid reference: TQ 27349 06532
- Location: Nevill Avenue, Brighton and Hove BN3 7NG
- Country: England
- Denomination: United Reformed Church
- Previous denomination: Congregational

History
- Status: Church
- Founded: 16 March 1938
- Founder: Sussex Pioneers
- Dedicated: 22 October 1939

Architecture
- Functional status: Active
- Architect: John Leopold Denman
- Style: Vernacular/Neo-Georgian
- Groundbreaking: 16 March 1938
- Completed: 17 September 1939
- Construction cost: £2,700

Specifications
- Capacity: 350
- Materials: Red and brown brick; tiles

The Hounsom Memorial Church is a United Reformed place of worship in Hove in the English city of Brighton and Hove. One of six churches of that denomination in the city, it was built in 1938 for the Congregational Church, which became part of the United Reformed Church in 1972. Its name commemorates William Allin Hounsom, a local man and longstanding member of the Congregational church in central Hove, who had wide-ranging business interests and landholdings across Sussex. The red-brick building, one of many local works by Brighton-based architect John Leopold Denman, is embellished with carvings that have been called "quite startling for a Nonconformist church".

== History ==
Hove was a village and parish that developed rapidly as a residential area in the 19th century in response to the growth of neighbouring Brighton. The Union Chapel, founded in the 17th century in Brighton, extended its mission to Hove in 1823, when some members established a Sunday school and temporary place of worship in a building belonging to local resident John Vallance. The congregation grew, and land was bought in 1861 for a permanent church in the rapidly developing Cliftonville area of Hove. Cliftonville Congregational Church was designed by Horatio Nelson Goulty and opened in 1870 as the first Nonconformist church in the town.

The church's local influence grew, and in 1899 it expanded its reach by opening a mission church, Rutland Hall, in the Aldrington area of Hove. A major benefactor of this new place of worship was William Allin Hounsom jp (1848–1934), a longstanding member of Cliftonville Congregational Church: he raised funds, gave land for the church and donated a house. Described as "a stalwart figure in Congregationalism in Sussex and beyond", Hounsom had also contributed money to the founding of a Congregational chapel at Horsted Keynes in West Sussex. In 1909, he was living at 41 New Church Road in Hove and was recorded as owning much land in the West Sussex parish of Yapton, near Arundel. He also held land in Ashdown Forest in East Sussex. Later in the 20th century he moved to 29 New Church Road, where he died on 28 January 1934. In the meantime, Rutland Hall's fortunes were declining: it was requisitioned for wartime use and most of the male members of the congregation were called up for military service.

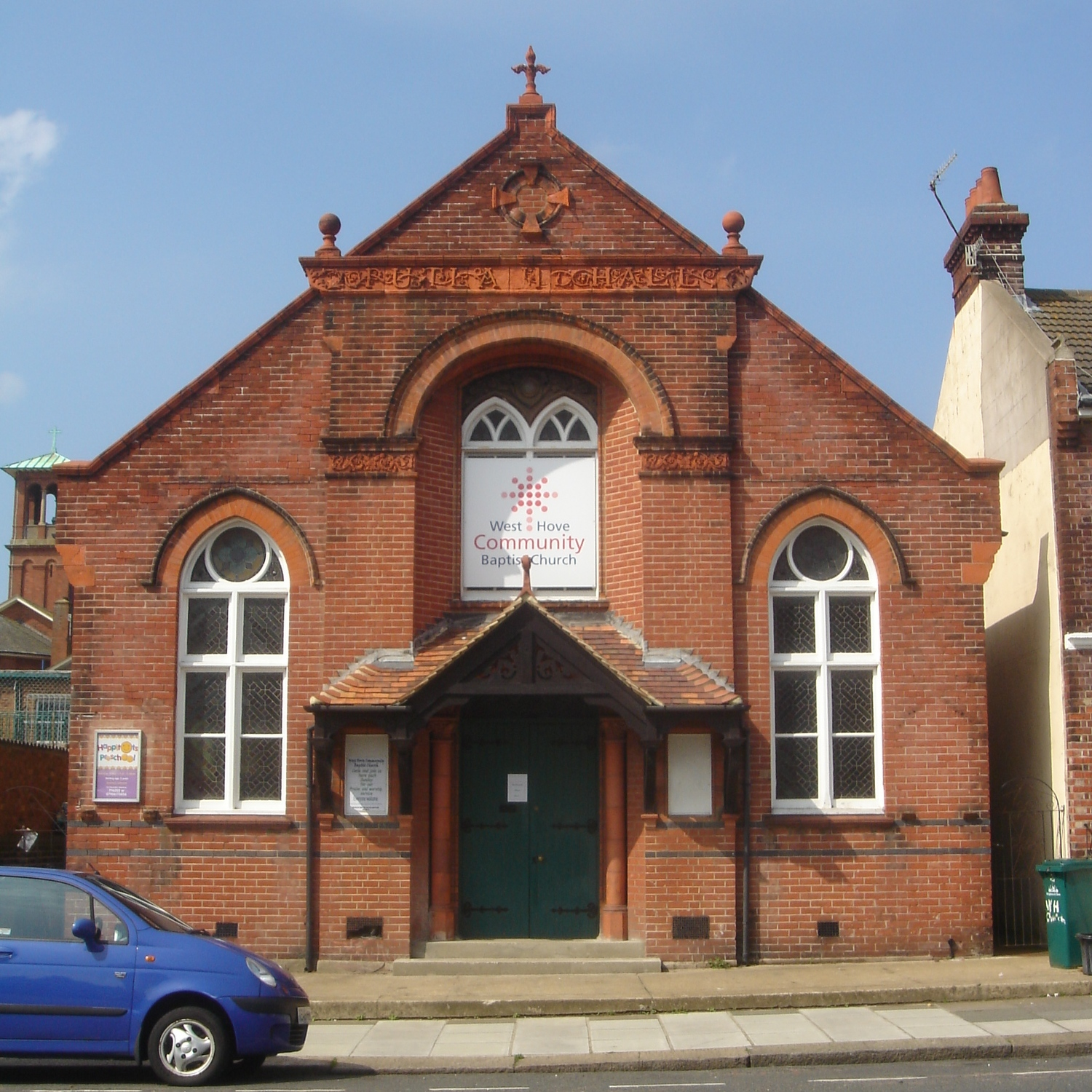
Rutland Hall was sold to finance the Hounsom Memorial Church.

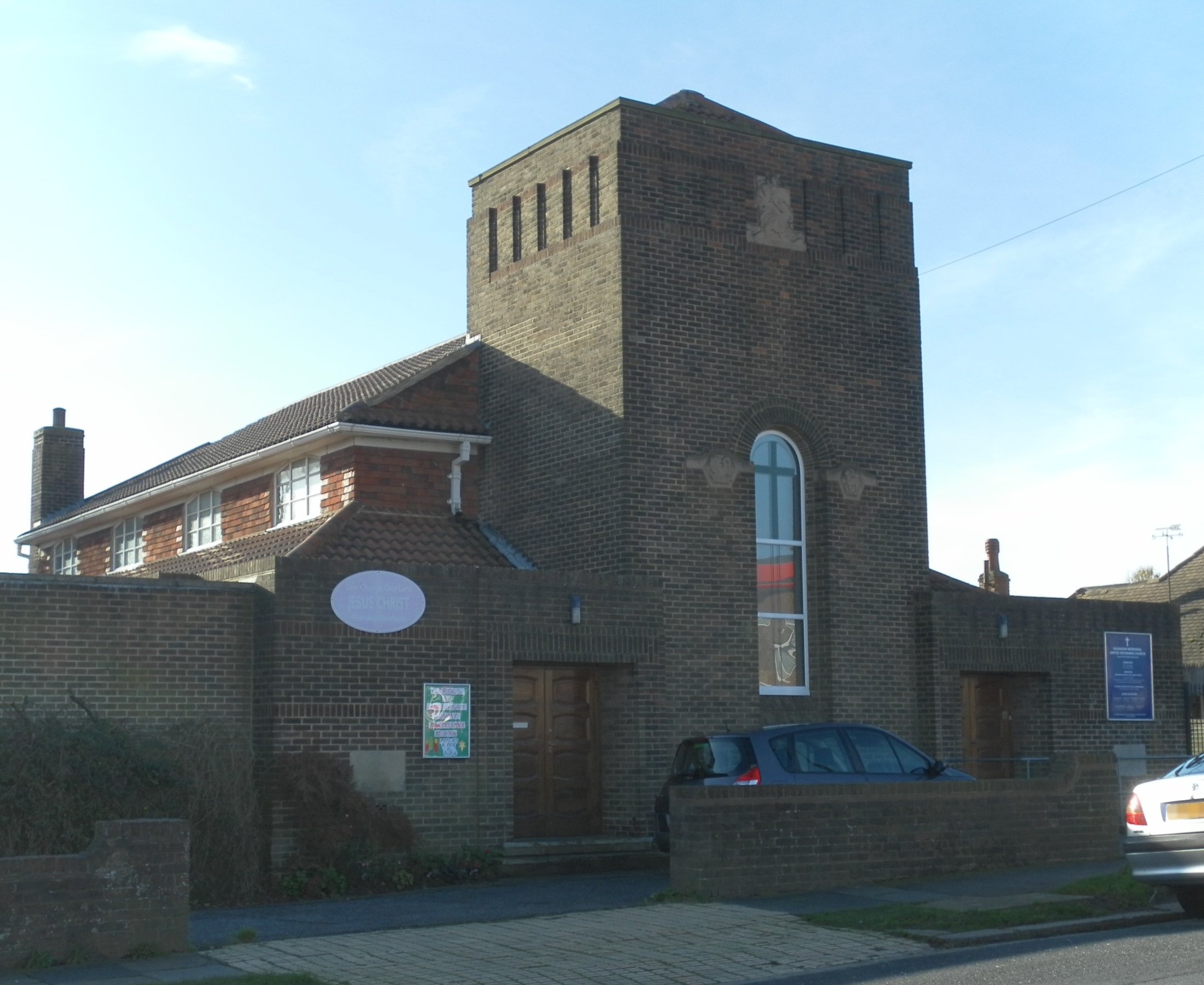
Small clerestory windows light the interior of the church.

During the interwar period, Hove experienced rapid residential development, mostly northwards on to the southern slopes of the South Downs. Before the mid-1920s, the Old Shoreham Road to Shoreham-by-Sea formed the boundary of the urban area; thereafter, housing estates such as Hangleton grew rapidly (especially after it became part of the Borough of Hove in 1928). From the beginning, it was expected to be a large suburb; by 1935, houses covered 1,120 acres (450 ha).

A group called the Sussex Pioneers, associated with the Sussex Congregational Union, was formed in the early 1930s with the aim of finding sites to establish new Congregational and Free churches. Its members included Congregational ministers and church laymen, including Hounsom himself. As a "quickly developing district" where no Nonconformist church had yet been founded, Hangleton was considered ideal, and in 1936 the Sussex Pioneers advised Cliftonville Congregational Church that a new place of worship should be founded there. Both parties started raising funds towards this, as did the Sussex Congregational Union; the Cliftonville Church made the largest contribution by selling Rutland Hall for £2,000. (It continued in religious use—first by Plymouth Brethren until 1947 or later, and as of 2008 by Baptists as the West Hove Community Baptist Church.) The congregation also raised a further £1,000, and £50 was promised annually for three years to pay the minister's stipend.

Several sites in the new suburb were considered, including Applesham Avenue, Hangleton Road and Nevill Avenue. The last named was found to be best, as the building could be set back from the road in a quiet setting, and a plot of land was purchased. Around this time, Rev. Jason S. Wright became the minister of the new church, and two local residents started a Sunday school in their house. They and the minister built up support for the church by visiting people in their houses and publicising it. Attendance at the Sunday school increased, and many people expressed an interest in attending services when the church opened. Some members of Cliftonville Congregational Church also decided to support the new venture by worshipping there when it opened.

The name Hounsom Memorial Church was agreed upon in memory of William Allin Hounsom's life and activities, and the church was founded with that name on 16 March 1938. At the ceremony, William Allin Hounsom's cousin Winifred Pike, Rev. Stanley Blomfield (representing Cliftonville Congregational Church) and Scott Graves (representing the Sussex Pioneers) each laid a foundation stone. Other local Christian groups were also represented: The Salvation Army provided music, and the nearby Bishop Hannington Memorial Church (Anglican) hosted a party afterwards. Cliftonville Church formed a committee to supervise construction work and manage the affairs of the new church; members included Revs Blomfield and Wright and a member of the Sussex Congregational Union. Local architect John Leopold Denman, "the master of ... mid-century Neo-Georgian" architecture, was commissioned to design the church; in a presentation at the founding ceremony, he discussed his proposed plan. "There [are] aisles and clerestory windows without those divisional units which usually separate aisles from the central part of the church. As to the tower ... cost meant that it could not be too imposing." The church would be heated by panels and flat radiators which were designed as part of the ceiling. Local firm Braybon & Son built the church, and it opened for worship on 17 September 1939. J. Ernest James bd, the Chairman-Elect of the Congregational Union of England and Wales, conducted the first service. The church had 70 members at this stage; when the membership roll was inaugurated in 1938 there were 52. It was officially constituted as a Congregational church on 22 October 1939, and on 8 November 1939 it was registered for marriages. After being constituted, the original administrative committee was replaced by a conventional diaconate of six members, and the church quickly became independent from the Cliftonville Congregational Church (although close links were maintained). The new church had its own schoolroom, which enabled the Sunday school to grow significantly: by 1939 there were 98 members, and the roll increased further when Hangleton received wartime evacuees from London and elsewhere.

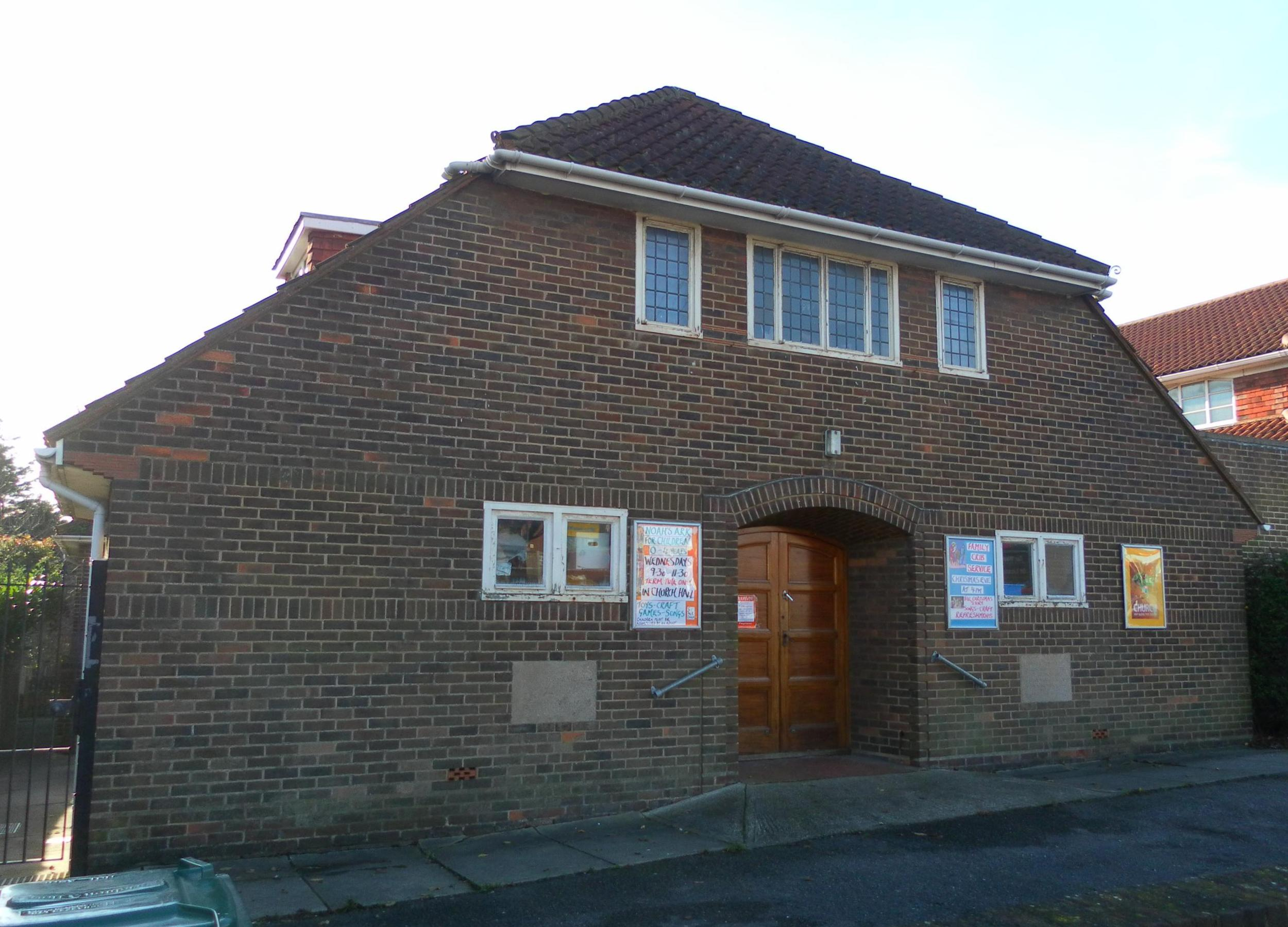
A church hall was built in 1951.

Financial difficulties during World War II were overcome with the help of grants from the Sussex Congregational Union and the Congregational Central Fund, and the church was debt-free by July 1947. The congregation then began to raise money to build a church hall; the £500 cost was met in May 1948, and construction work started on a site to the east of the church. Work was completed in 1951; John Leopold Denman was again responsible for the design. Having its own hall enabled the church's many groups and organisations to thrive: in 1938 a Women's Fellowship was formed, followed by the Girls' Brigade (1939; still extant), Boys' Brigade (1941; disbanded in the 1990s), Life Boy Team (1941), Young People's Fellowship (1943), and a Men's Fireside Group (1944). After observing "Junior Churches" set up for children at the Clermont Congregational Church in Preston Village and another church in Beckenham, members of the congregation set one up in 1944. The hall also served as Hangleton's original community centre and library: the suburb did not get a purpose-built library until 1962. Other innovations included "Dramatic Services" (worship in the form of plays) from 1945 onwards—these attracted interest from across Brighton and Hove and further afield—and screenings of religious films.

The church bought a Kawai grand piano with money left as a bequest. In April 1990, Tony Bennett was due to perform a concert at the Brighton Dome. During his warm-up, he broke the venue's piano, putting the show in jeopardy. An employee who looked after the Brighton Philharmonic Orchestra's pianos when they played at the Dome mentioned the Hounsom Memorial Church's instrument—and it was brought to the Dome in time for Bennett's performance.

Along with most Congregational and Presbyterian churches in England, Hounsom Memorial Church became part of the United Reformed Church in 1972. It is designated as a "local congregation" of that denomination. It is one of six belonging to that denomination in the city of Brighton and Hove. As well as the former Cliftonville Congregational Church (now styled the Central United Reformed Church), the others are at North Road in central Brighton (Brighthelm Church and Community Centre), Lewes Road, Portslade and Saltdean (St Martin's Church). Proposals to change the name of the church to St Christopher's Church, referring to the bas-relief depiction of that saint on the front of the building, were put forward in the 1950s but were not acted upon.

The church is licensed for worship in accordance with the Places of Worship Registration Act 1855 and has the registration number 58318.

== Architecture ==
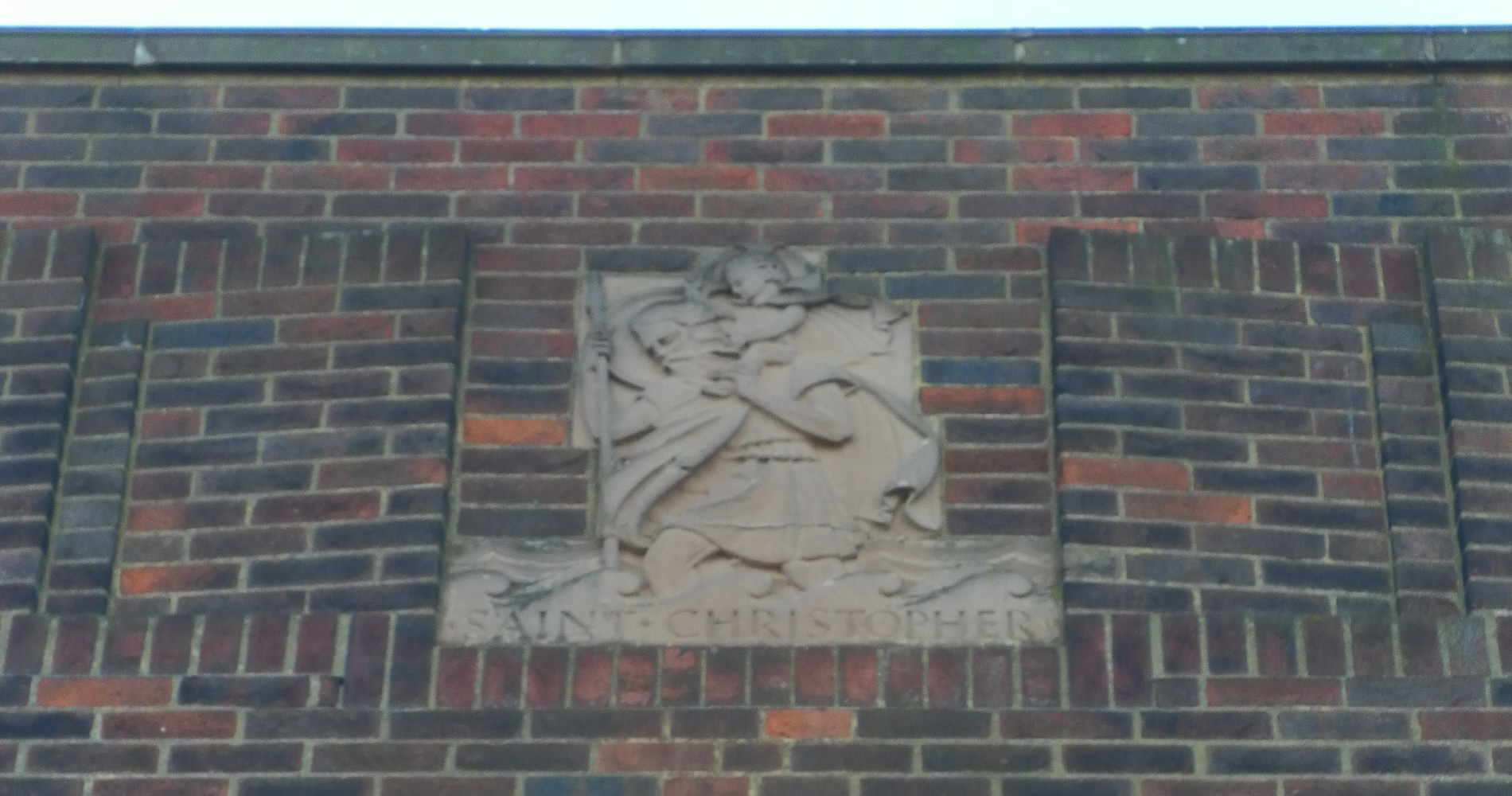
Saint Christopher is represented in bas-relief form at the top of the tower.

The brief given to John Leopold Denman by the founders was specific: the new church had to be "...unlike a 15th-century church or a Nonconformist chapel or a cinema, but [instead] a modern type of building in keeping with the area". His design has elements of the Vernacular and his favoured Neo-Georgian style, with some elements of Modernism. The 350-capacity church has a single internal space measuring 36 by 24 feet (11.0 m × 7.3 m) lit by small clerestory windows at the top of the aisles. The walls are of "mottled" red brick made at the Ringmer brickworks in East Sussex; the red roof tiles were also produced there. A stubby tower topped with a shallow pantile-covered spire stands at the north end; this has three "startling" bas-relief representations of Saint Christopher, a pelican and a lamb—the latter two representing sacrifice and the Lamb of God. Such allegorical depictions are unusual for a Nonconformist church.

== See also ==
- List of places of worship in Brighton and Hove
