= Shri Swaminarayan Mandir, Brighton =

Hindu temple in Brighton and Hove, UK

Coordinates: 50.8369°N 0.2163°W

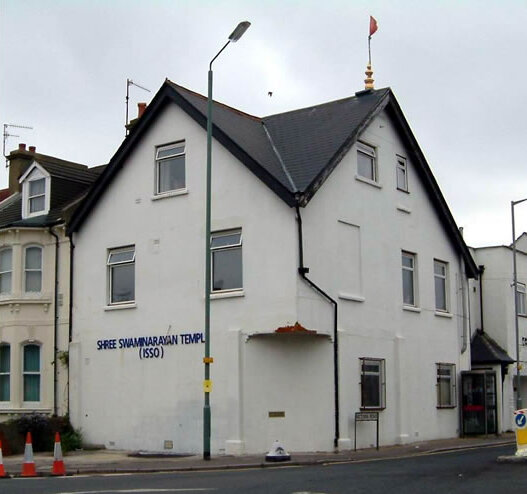
The temple

Shri Swaminarayan Mandir, Brighton is a Swaminarayan Hindu Temple located in the Portslade area of the city of Brighton and Hove, on the south east coast of England. Inaugurated on 19 September 1999, the 10th Swaminarayan temple to be opened in the UK. The temple comes under the ISSO wing of the Swaminarayan Sampraday

The Murti Pratishta was done by Acharya Maharajshree Tejendraprasad Pande among chants of vedic hymns. The event was attended by the MP and Mayor of Brighton as well as the Indian High Commissioner in the UK.

== See also ==
- List of places of worship in Brighton and Hove
