= St Luke's Church, Brighton =

Church in England

St Luke's Church
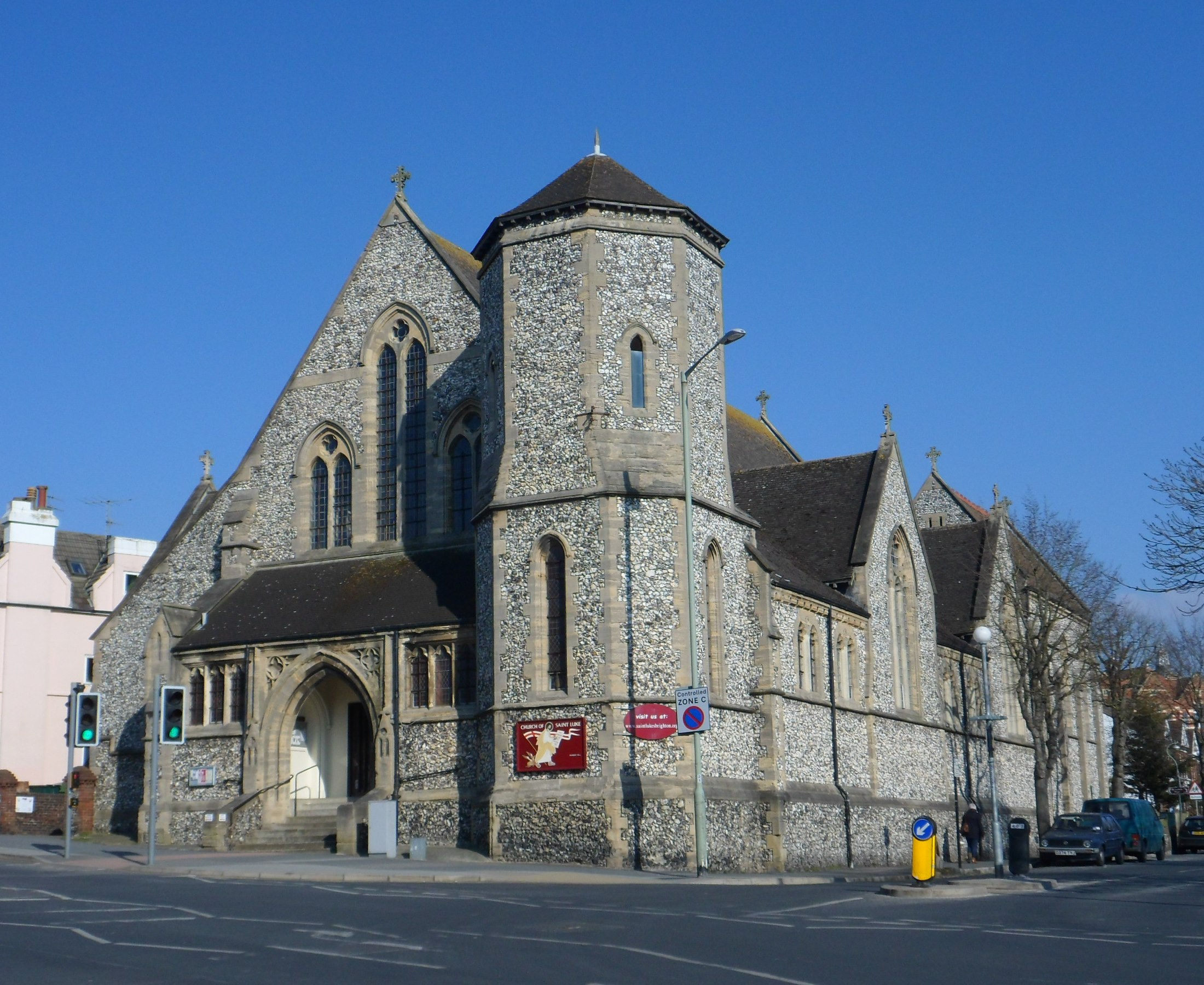
- The church in 2013
- St Luke's Church
- 50°49′39.6″N 0°07′27.0″W
- Location: Queen's Park, Brighton
- Country: England
- Denomination: Church of England
- Churchmanship: High church/Anglo-Catholic
- Website: www.saintlukesbrighton.org

History
- Consecrated: 16 April 1885

Architecture
- Years built: 1882-1885

Specifications
- Capacity: 900

Administration
- Province: Canterbury
- Diocese: Chichester
- Archdeaconry: Chichester
- Deanery: Brighton
- Parish: Brighton, St Luke

Clergy
- Vicar: Deacon Julie Newson

St Luke's Church is an Anglican church in the Queen's Park area of Brighton, part of the English city of Brighton and Hove. Occupying a large corner site on Queen's Park Road, it was designed in the 1880s by Sir Arthur Blomfield in the Early English style, and has been given listed building status because of its architectural importance.

== History ==
Queen's Park was laid out as an ornamental park of 15.3 acres (6.2 ha) in 1824. Charles Barry was hired to design decorative entrances and a villa for the park's owner. Housing development around the park had started in the 1810s and continued throughout the 19th century. The first Anglican place of worship in the area was built in 1875 and became a chapel of ease to St Mary's Church in Kemptown when that church was completed. The red-brick building was on the west side of Queen's Park Road. In 1880 a separate parish was established, and preparatory work on the new church started the following year on the opposite side of the road. The site was bought for £900; the foundation stone was laid in 1882 by the Bishop of Chichester, Richard Durnford; and Arthur Blomfield finished the church in 1885, apart from a proposed spire which was never built because of a lack of money. The new St Luke's Church was consecrated on 16 April 1885. The 1875 building held services until then; it then became the church hall until it was gutted by fire and demolished in the 1970s, after which flats were built on the site.

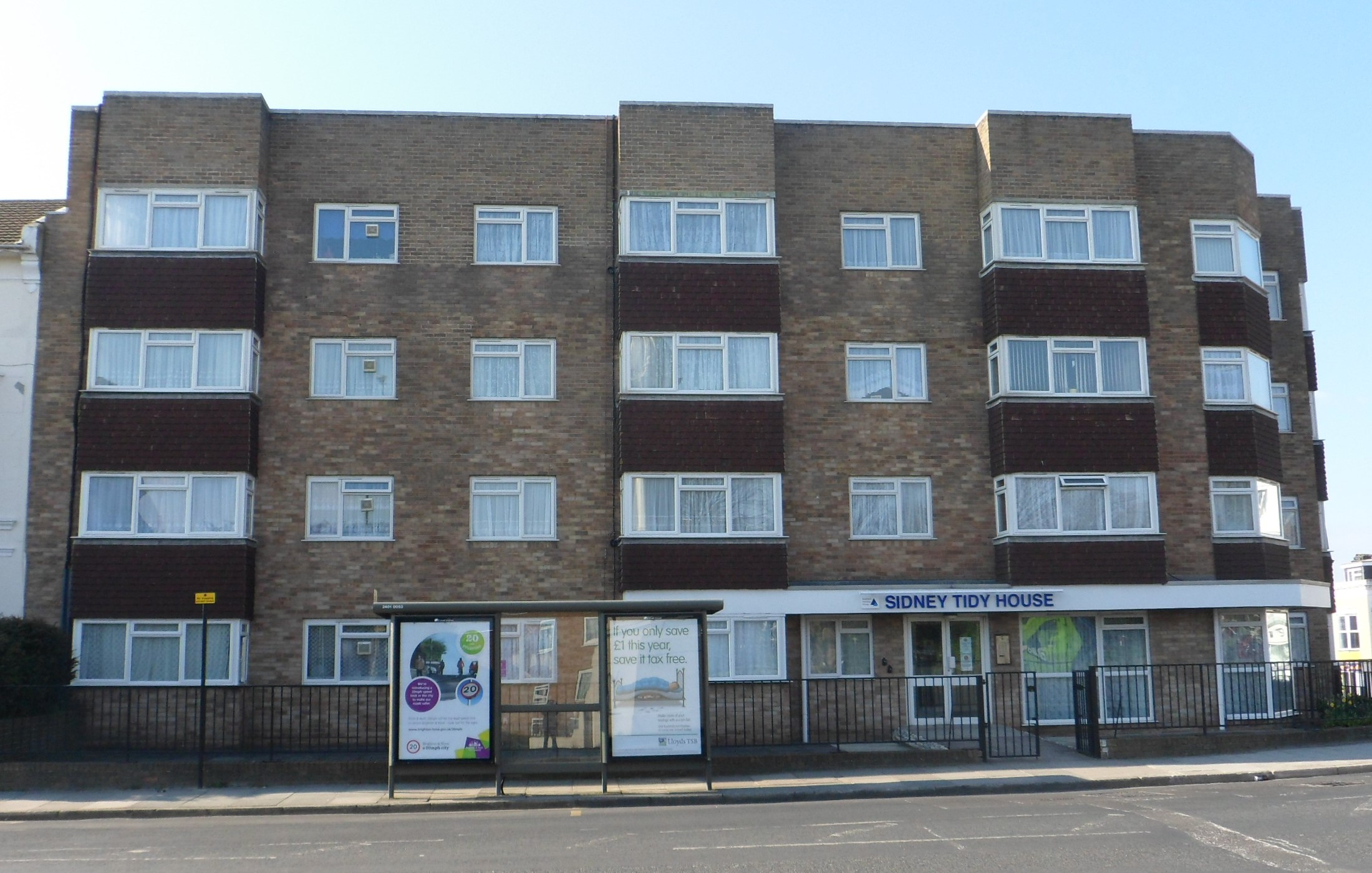
These flats were built on the site of the original church of 1875.

The first vicar of St Luke's was Revd Walter Firth, a follower of Tractarianism; services were "High church" in style. He worked hard to alleviate poverty and improve people's lives in the densely populated parish, especially by establishing educational and charitable activities. This style of worship continued under subsequent vicars in the early decades of the church, and became re-established in the 1970s. A memorial to the then-incumbent vicar Arthur Young's son, who died in World War I, was erected in 1918; two years later a memorial to all parishioners who had died in the war was added. Finances were always tight, and electricity was not installed until 1947, at which time internal repairs were carried out and some new fittings were added. Despite this, the church was threatened with demolition in 1950; petitions and fundraising were successful in reversing this decision, which had it gone ahead would have resulted in parishioners transferring to St Martin's Church within a newly enlarged parish of St Martin.

The parish of St Luke existed as a separate entity until 1974, when it was merged into the newly constituted Parish of the Resurrection. Six years earlier it had been enlarged substantially, both in area and in the number of parishioners served, when the nearby St Matthew's Church closed down and its congregation was transferred to St Luke's. On 1 February 2009 the Team Ministry and Parish of the Resurrection was dissolved and St Luke's once again became a separate parish in its own right. The last team vicar, Fr Christopher Woodman, became the first incumbent of the new parish. Since 2010, the Incumbent has been a Deacon-in-Charge, the Reverend Julie Newson.

== Architecture ==
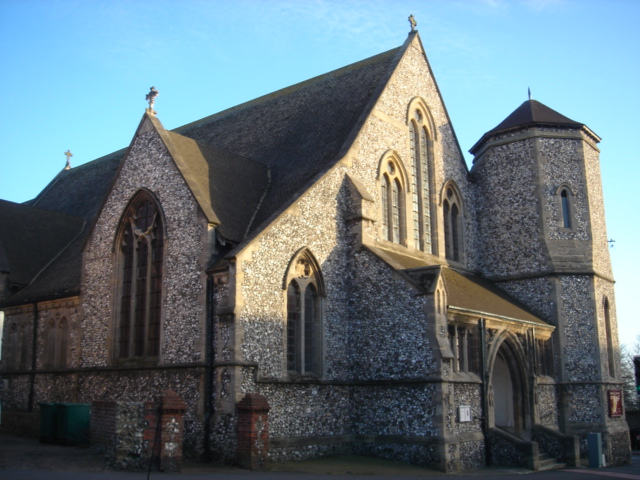
The church from the northwest

The church is built predominantly of flint with mouldings and window dressings of stone. Internally very spacious, it can hold up to 900 people. Its south and west elevations face the street. At the east end is a three-bay chancel flanked by a Lady chapel and vestry to the south and north respectively. This adjoins the four-bay, north- and south-aisled nave, at the southwest corner of which is the octagonal tower. A substantial, three-stage structure with a shallow cap at the same height as the nave roof, the tower was in fact intended to be much taller and topped with a spire rising to 160 feet (49 m); but the extension and spire were never built. The entrance is in a porch which runs along the length of the west face.

Lancet windows predominate, typical of the Early English Gothic architectural style of which St Luke's is a revival. The east face has a set of five grouped together between two buttresses. The Lady chapel has a similar group of three on its east side—with stained glass by Charles Eamer Kempe—and three single lancets in the south face. The west face, above the entrance, has three paired lancets with small quatrefoil windows above them.

The chancel and Lady chapel have vaulted wooden ceilings with corbelled supporting arches. The chancel and nave are linked by an arch and are at different levels. The nave roof is also of timber and is divided into sections corresponding with the four bays below. A highly decorative carved reredos in five sections is behind the altar. The church's most distinctive design element is the unusual layout of gables and windows in the north and south aisles; Nikolaus Pevsner described it as "curious" and a "disturbing motif". In the aisles, the bays have a sequence of alternating designs: one set has a cross-gable with timber barrel vault roof and a tall single window, and the other set has a lower, simple roof and a pair of small windows with a tracery design. The "curiosity" is that each gabled bay in the north aisle is opposed by a low-roofed bay in the south aisle and vice versa, rather than the pattern being identical in both aisles.

An organ was installed in 1885 in a chamber in the east end of the nave. At the west end, one bay was converted in the 1960s into a room for general use. Internal fixtures include an octagonal font, balustraded pulpit, choir stall in the chancel and the reredos.

== The church today ==
St Luke's was listed at Grade II on 26 August 1999. Worship is in a relaxed Catholic style, using Common Worship of the Church of England, and there is much use of music. There is one service at 10am every Sunday and a Eucharist on Wednesday.

== See also ==
- Grade II listed buildings in Brighton and Hove: S
- List of places of worship in Brighton and Hove
