= St Leonard's Church, Aldrington =

Church in Brighton and Hove, England

St Leonard, Aldrington
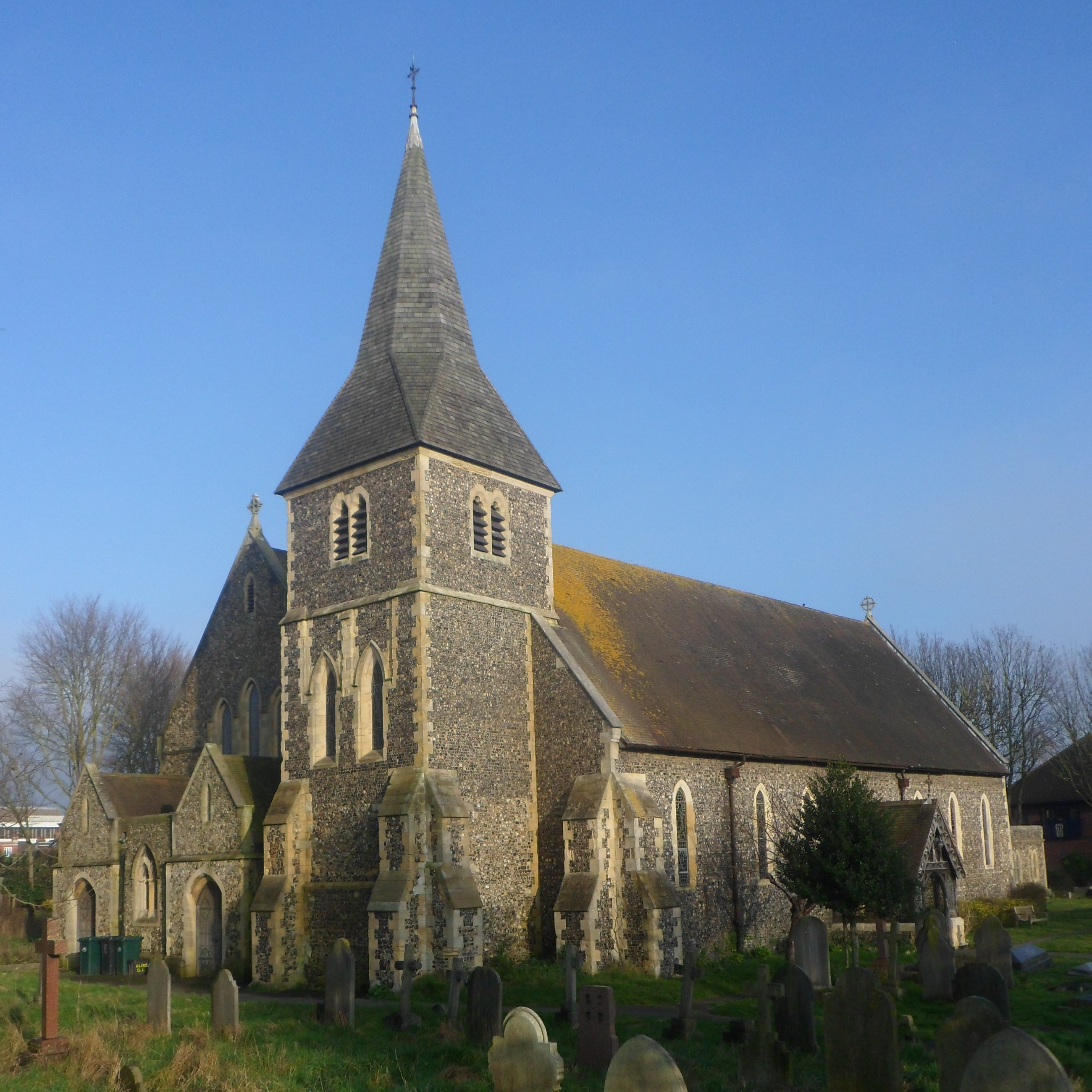
- The church from the southwest
- St Leonard, Aldrington
- 50°49′58.58″N 0°12′13.56″W
- Denomination: Church of England

History
- Dedication: Saint Leonard of Noblac

Administration
- Province: Canterbury
- Diocese: Chichester
- Archdeaconry: Archdeaconry of Brighton & Lewes
- Deanery: Rural Deanery of Hove
- Parish: Aldrington, St Leonard

Clergy
- Vicar: Ali Marshall

St Leonard's Church is an Anglican church in Hove, in the English city of Brighton and Hove. It is on New Church Road in the Aldrington area of Hove, which was previously a separate village, and it serves as Aldrington's parish church. The church was on Church Road but now stands on New Church Road, renamed in reference to the other church (St Philip's) which was started in 1894 as a chapel of ease. The interior of the church was refurbished between 2021 and 2023 as part of a £1.1 million project. Regular activities at the church include traditional and contemporary Sunday services at 0900 and 1100 respectively, along with groups through the week such Little Lions, a Community Cafe, St Leonard's Business Connections and Alpha.

== History ==
Aldrington developed in the mediaeval period as a small village between Hove, to the east, and the original (inland) settlement at Portslade, near the mouth of the River Adur. Over time the course of the river changed, and the population gradually fell; damage caused to houses in the Great Storm of 1703 increased the rate of decline, and the area was totally depopulated by 1800. A mediaeval parish church, built in the 13th century with a tower, chancel and nave, existed on a site to the northeast of Aldrington's only road. This started to fall into disrepair in the 16th century, however, and was in ruins by 1638, with the walls collapsing soon after 1800.

The rapid residential development of Hove in the early and mid-19th century revived Aldrington. As demand for land and housing grew, development spread westwards and Church Road — the continuation of the main east–west route through Hove and Brighton — was extended from the edge of Aldrington into Portslade. In the sixty years from 1875, all of the land to the south of Church Road was developed with housing, and the opening of Aldrington railway station to the north stimulated growth in its vicinity. The parish of Aldrington officially became part of Hove in 1893, being incorporated within its district. The following year, the section of Church Road west of Hove Street was renamed New Church Road after plans for the construction of St Philip's Church were agreed.

St Leonard's church remained in its ruined state until 1878, when architect Richard Herbert Carpenter (the son of Richard Cromwell Carpenter, designer of St Paul's Church in Brighton) and Benjamin Ingelow were chosen to rebuild it. They incorporated parts of the tower and south aisle into the new design, which was a reproduction of the mediaeval style — in particular through the use of lancet windows and knapped flintwork. The new tower included six bells.

Another major rebuilding took place in 1936, to increase the capacity of the church. Harold Milburn-Pett, architect for the Diocese of Chichester, undertook this work. The building was widened significantly: the original nave was turned into an aisle, and a new nave and chancel were built on the north side. A northern aisle was never added, although there were plans to do so; the northern exterior wall of the church, intended as a temporary structure, is therefore different in style from the other walls, being in red brick rather than knapped flint. (As with the first rebuilding, the rest of the 1936 work used knapped flintwork.) In the same year a spire was added to the tower for the first time. New lancet windows were installed at various times after World War II, as was a lychgate on the southern side. The church was listed as Grade II in 1950.

The ashes of actor C. Aubrey Smith are interred in his mother's grave in the churchyard of St Leonard's. The church also holds a Commonwealth War Grave from 1917.

The church was listed at Grade II by English Heritage on 24 March 1950. This defines it as a "nationally important" building of "special interest". As of February 2001, it was one of 1,124 Grade II-listed buildings and structures, and 1,218 listed buildings of all grades, in the city of Brighton and Hove.

== Parish ==
The area served by the parish covers Aldrington. It includes all residential streets in the area bounded by Wish Road, the sea, Boundary Road/Station Road and the railway line between Portslade and Aldrington stations, and extends north of the railway to include the whole of Hove Cemetery. This originally opened in 1882, and was later extended on to the former trackbed of the Devil's Dyke Railway.

== See also ==
- Grade II listed buildings in Brighton and Hove: S
- List of places of worship in Brighton and Hove
- Media related to St Leonard's Church, Aldrington at Wikimedia Commons

== Bibliography ==
- Dale, Antony (1989). Brighton Churches. London: Routledge. ISBN 0-415-00863-8.
