= St Philip's Church, Hove =

Coordinates: 50.8306°N 0.1888°W

St Philip, Hove
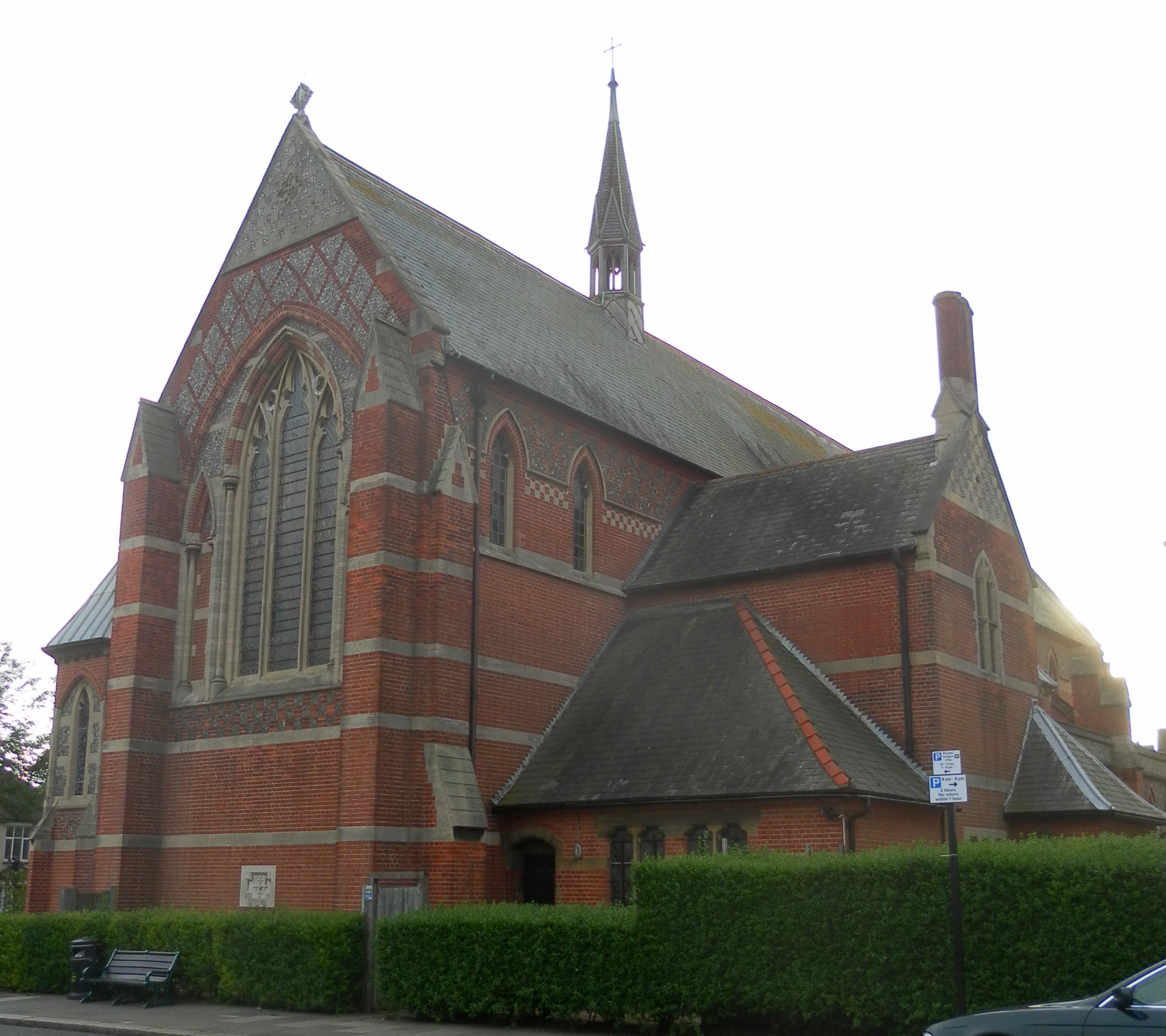
- The church from the northeast
- St Philip, Hove
- Denomination: Church of England

History
- Status: Closed
- Dedication: St Philip

Architecture
- Heritage designation: Grade II
- Designated: 2 November 1992
- Closed: 11 October 2023

Administration
- Province: Canterbury
- Diocese: Chichester
- Archdeaconry: Chichester
- Deanery: Rural Deanery of Hove
- Parish: Hove, St Philip

Clergy
- Vicar: Rev Stephen Terry

St Philip's Church is a Church of England parish church in Hove, in the city of Brighton and Hove, England. It was opened in 1895 and consecrated in 1898 on New Church Road, near Aldrington's parish church of St Leonard's. It is a Grade II listed building. It was closed in October 2023.

== History ==
The road now named New Church Road is the old route between the ancient villages of Hove and Aldrington. There was some Roman and Saxon activity at Aldrington, but severe decline set in during the 18th and 19th centuries, such that only one person was living there by 1831. The rapid residential growth of Hove in the mid-19th century stimulated development in Aldrington from around 1850, however, and St Leonard's Church was rebuilt from its ruined state to serve the area. By 1894, Aldrington and Hove had merged, and the population of Aldrington alone exceeded 2,200. It was decided that a chapel of ease was needed to serve the area east of St Leonard's Church. Its rector bought land from the Duke of Portland in November of that year and commissioned Sir George Gilbert Scott's son John Oldrid Scott to design a church.

Building work took less than a year: the first service at St Philip's took place on 28 October 1895. The consecration ceremony was not held until 29 May 1898, however. By that date, £5,492.15s.10d (£617,249 in 2025) had been spent on construction and the land. It was extended at a cost of about £4,000 (£407,400 in 2025) between 1909 and 1910, at which point the deeds transferring ownership of the land from the Duke of Portland to the rector of St Leonard's Church was found to be invalid. A new arrangement was drawn up and the church became the property of the Ecclesiastical Commissioners. In 1912 it gained its own benefice and parish, which still exists as of 2012 and which has had ten vicars since its creation.

Another extension was added in 1941: architecture firm Tetley and Felce designed and added a porch. The west end of the church was converted into a hall in 1956; a large (300 sq ft) Sussex-themed mural was painted on the dividing wall by the muralist Augustus Lunn in 1957 and 1958.

The church received national attention in its centenary year when an edition of the long-running BBC Radio programme Any Questions? was recorded there. On 10 March 1995, three major political figures and The Spectator deputy editor Anne Applebaum took part in a debate and answered questions from the audience. The programme was broadcast live on BBC Radio 4. Former Conservative Prime Minister Sir Edward Heath, Labour minister and SDP founder Roy Jenkins and former Labour minister Gerald Kaufman were on the panel.

== Architecture ==
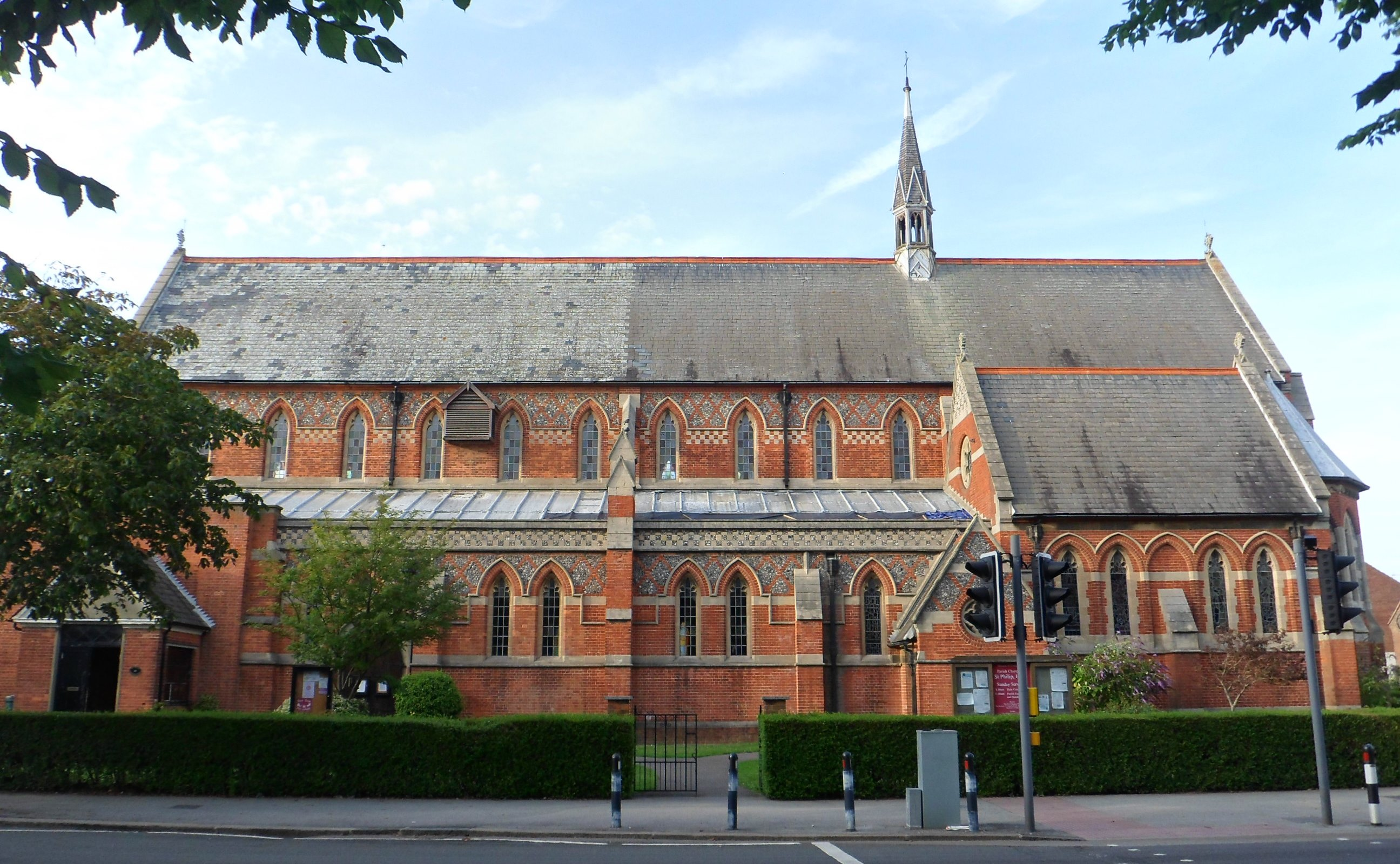
The polychromatic exterior combines several materials, principally red brick.

St Philip's Church is considered a good example of Oldrid Scott's architectural techniques. Architecturally it is broadly Gothic Revival in the Decorated style, and is distinguished by its impressive use of building materials of various colours and types. Knapped flintwork, limestone, Bath Stone and red brickwork are combined in complex patterns all over the exterior; the extension of 1909–1910 was consistent with this, and is indistinguishable from the older section.

In its current form, the church consists of a 6½-bay nave (of which the three westernmost bays form the church hall), aisles on the north and south sides, chancel with chamfered arch, apsidal Lady chapel with a lead roof, porch, vestry, clerestory and small flèche. Charles Eamer Kempe, an important stained glass designer of the Victorian era, provided the window at the east end and one in the south aisle, and many of the other windows (most of which are lancets) also contain stained glass. Local firm Cox & Barnard supplied three of these: designer Anthony Gilbert provided a window in the south chapel in 1955, depicting Saint George and commemorating parishioner George Howell; in 1960 Paul Chapman designed another window in the same part of the church, in memory of William Cheverton – it depicts Saint Cecilia holding a musical instrument and crowned with "an unusual halo resembling yellow laurel leaves interspersed with roses" – and in the same year, a window commemorating Halcyon Ann Lopez and depicting the virtue of Charity was installed in the south side of the nave. A new bell was cast for the church in 1961.

== Holy Cross Church ==
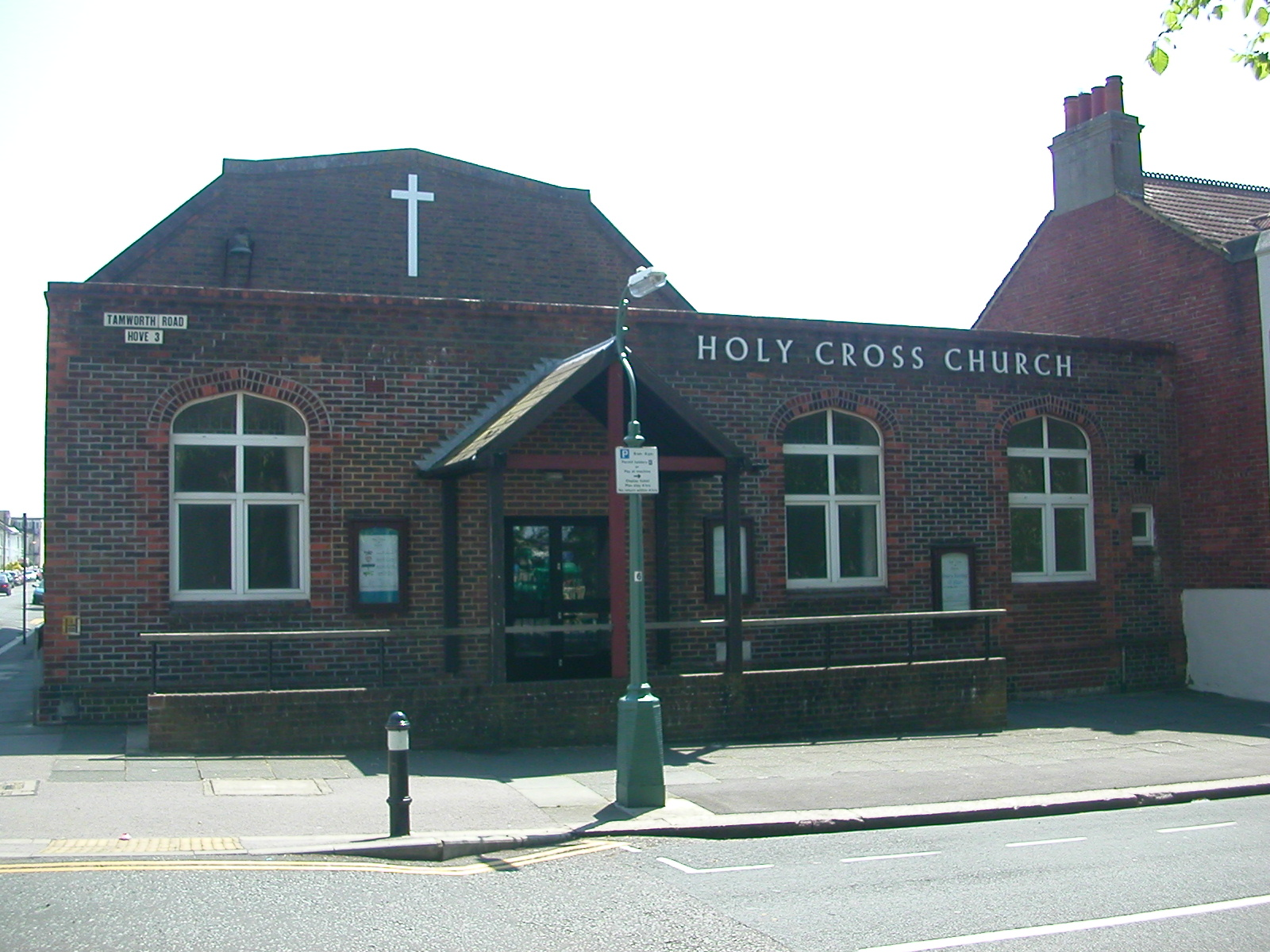
The Holy Cross Church

In 1903, the Bishop of Chichester Ernest Wilberforce opened a mission hall to serve the northern part of St Leonard's and St Philip's parish. The Holy Cross Church, as it was called, then became part of St Philip's parish in 1912, but gained its own parish in 1932 and is now linked to the Bishop Hannington Memorial Church. The building had been used as a church hall and social venue as well as a place of worship until 1932. Although the vicar of St Philip's later acquired land for a new hall, no such facility was ever built, which encouraged the conversion of part of the church into a hall in 1956.

== The church today ==
English Heritage made the church a Grade II listed building on 2 November 1992.

In 2000 the Brighton and Hove Deaneries Pastoral Strategy Review Group was established on the instruction of the Diocese of Chichester to consider the future of churches in the two deaneries. The group's report, published in June 2003, recommended the closure of St Philip's Church and its conversion to alternative uses. This conclusion was based on its proximity to St Leonard's Church (whose status as an ancient parish church gave it more importance within the deanery) and the inability of the churches to cover their maintenance and other costs. As of 2012, the church is still open, and offers two services every Sunday. The parish is bounded by Portland Road, Westbourne Street, Westbourne Place, the seafront, Wish Road and Coleman Avenue on the borders of Hove and Aldrington.

The church was closed after a final service held on 11 October 2023. The freehold of the building was put up for sale by the Diocese of Chichester in late 2024.

== See also ==
- Grade II listed buildings in Brighton and Hove: S
- List of places of worship in Brighton and Hove

== Bibliography ==
- Elleray, D. Robert (1981). The Victorian Churches of Sussex. Chichester: Phillimore & Co. ISBN 0-85033-378-4.
- Elleray, D. Robert (2004). Sussex Places of Worship. Worthing: Optimus Books. ISBN 0-9533132-7-1.
- Middleton, Judy (1979). A History of Hove. Chichester: Phillimore & Co. ISBN 0-85033-325-3.
- Middleton, Judy (1996). Britain in Old Photographs: Hove. Stroud: Sutton Publishing Ltd. ISBN 0-7509-1374-6.
- Middleton, Judy (2002). The Encyclopaedia of Hove & Portslade. Brighton: Brighton & Hove Libraries.
- Nairn, Ian; Pevsner, Nikolaus (1965). Sussex. The Buildings of England. Harmondsworth: Penguin Books. ISBN 0-14-071028-0.
- Salzman, L.F, ed. (1940). A History of the County of Sussex. Victoria County History. Vol. 7: The Rape of Lewes. London: Oxford University Press for the Institute of Historical Research. ISBN 978-0712905893.
- Scott, Eddie (1995). Hove: A Pictorial History. Chichester: Phillimore & Co. ISBN 0-85033-981-2.
