= Hollingdean =

Area of Brighton and Hove, East Sussex, England

Coordinates: 50°50′38″N 0°07′50″W

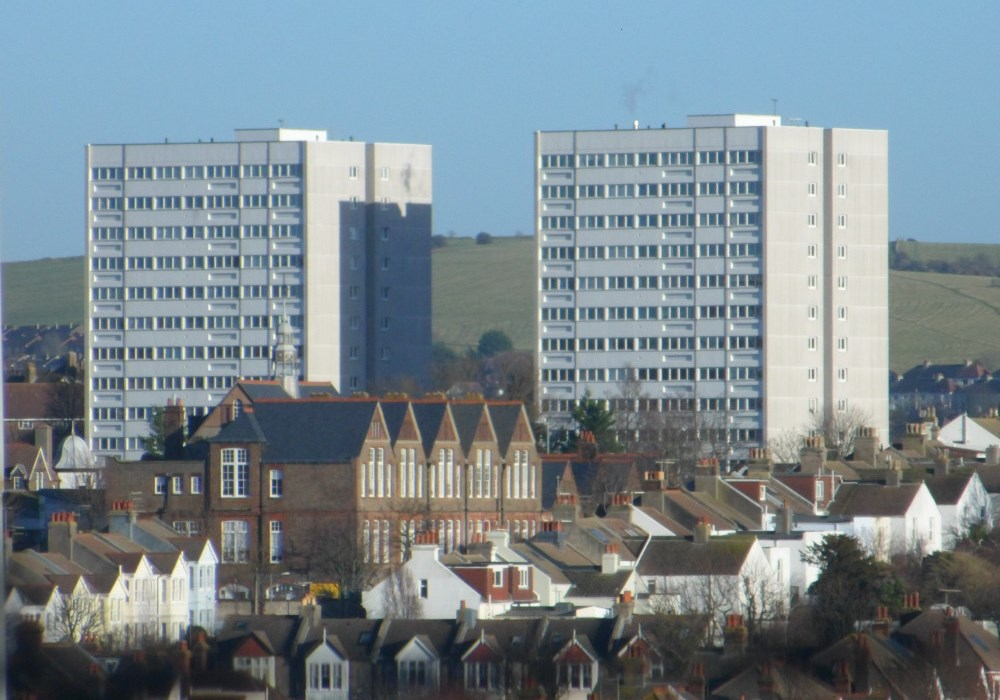
Nettleton Court and Dudeney Lodge, in Hollingdean. A landmark pair of council tower blocks in the east of Brighton, visible from many parts of the city. The gabled brick building in front is the Downs Junior School, originally a boarding school.

Hollingdean is a district in the city of Brighton & Hove. The Ward is called Hollingdean and Stanmer with a population of 15,681 at the 2011 Census. By the time of the local authority elections in May 2023 the Ward boundary had been changed and it is now called Hollingdean and Fiveways. After the boundary change, the new Ward had an electorate of 10,977. Hollingdean is in effect the older part of Hollingbury. It is bounded by Ditchling Road to the west, the Round Hill area to the south, and Lewes Road and Moulsecoomb to the east. It is a mainly residential area, with many council houses to the east and low-rise flats in the central part, with late 19th and early 20th-century terraced houses towards Fiveways, and some railway land, light industry, and warehousing.

== Notable areas ==
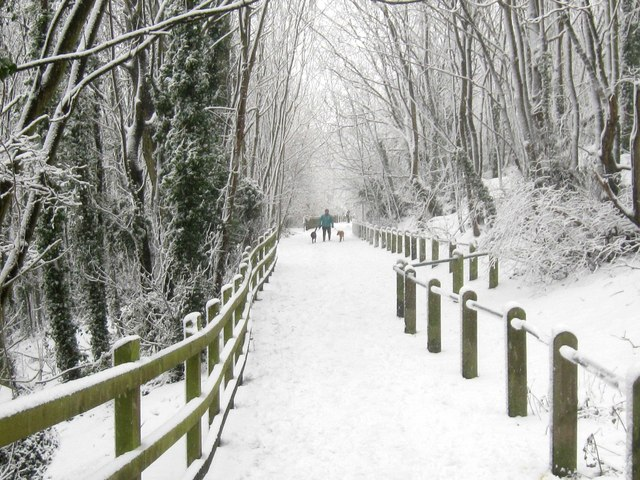
Hollingbury Woods in the snow

To the north of Hollingdean is an oasis of undeveloped green space. At its centre is Hollingbury Castle or Hillfort (TQ 322 078). This Iron Age hillfort is a scheduled monument. Now all that remains are the ancient field patterns of ridges and dips. The ground is covered with thickets of gorse and are home to colourful birds such as green woodpecker, linnets and goldfinch. Additionally, rare birds can be seen in the area in spring and autumn on passage to-and-from their breeding grounds such as whinchat and redstart. The soil within and around the camp has a layer of superficial acidity, with sorrel, bent-grass and tormentil growing there. To the south of the Hillfort is the Hollingbury Golf Course.

There are three allotment sites in the area - Lower Roedale, Roedale Valley and Thompson Road. To the northwest of Hollingdean is the 200 year old Hollingbury Woods, now full of the rotting carcases of beech giants toppled in the 1987 gale, which receives the attentive care of a local ‘Friends’ group. It runs up to Hollingbury Park, known locally as the "Rocket Park" as a consequence of one of the old climbing frames which used to exist there. To the northeast is there is a public park with children's play area on Lynchet Close.

To the north of the Hillfort is the Hollingbury ridge which runs up to Stanmer park and the South Downs National Park. To the northwest is a dew pond after which there is a steep slope which runs down to Wild Park (TQ 327 080).

== Amenities ==
=== Hollingdean Community Centre ===
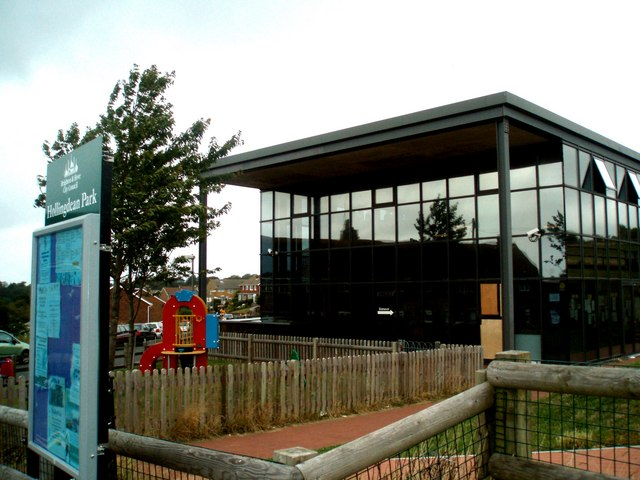
Hollingdean Children's Centre

Hollingdean Community Centre is on Thompson Road to the east of the area. It is run by the Hollingdean Development Trust and used for community activities and meetings and available for hire. Regular events include fitness classes. On Thursdays the volunteer-run Hollingbean Cafe is organised by the Real Junk Food project - offering meals made from food that would otherwise go to waste on a pay as you feel basis.

=== Shops ===
Local shops are found in the area known as 'The Dip' The Post Office is currently open, there are corner shops, a café, pharmacy, funeral director's and some takeaways. There is also a parade of shops on Davey Drive.

A volunteer-run community wholefood shop - Hollingdean Wholefoods is open daily at Coachwerks in Hollingdean Terrace.

=== Transport ===
The area is served by the Number 20 bus route to Churchill Square.

=== Children and Schools ===
There is a Sure Start Children's Centre on Lynchet Close, with a volunteer-run cafe and public toilets and nursery. The schools in Hollingdean are Hertford Infants, Hertford Juniors, Cedar Centre Special School, and Pupil Referral Centre.

== Church ==
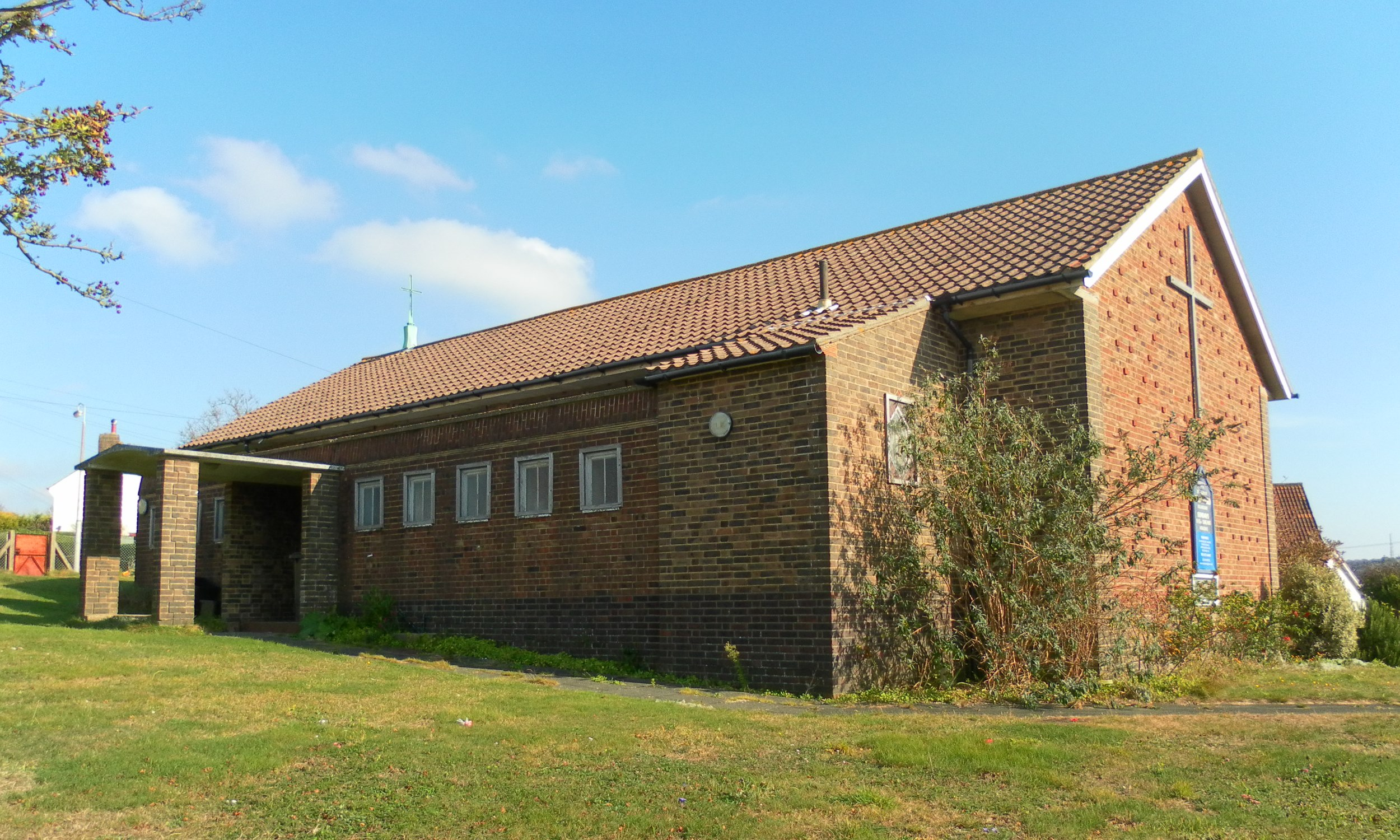
Former St Richard's Church, The Crossway, Hollingdean

Following boundary changes in January 2019, St Matthias Church on Ditchling Road is the parish church of Hollingdean. St Richards on The Crossway was deconsecrated in 2013. However, in 2021 it was reconsecrated and now a functioning church with an 11am service every sunday. The hall is used for events - in particular an annual Christmas Fayre - Lucky Dip.

== Local information ==
Volunteers produce and distribute a quarterly newsletter Hollingdean News delivered to 3000 addresses across the city. Hollingdean News also has a website.
