= Aldrington =

Area of Brighton and Hove, England

Coordinates: 50.8304375°N 0.1945625°W

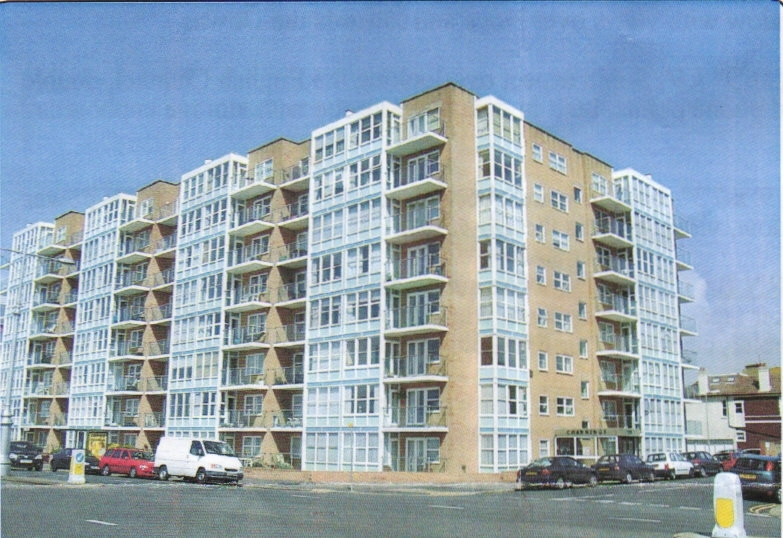
- Channings, Aldrington

- Location within East Sussex
- Unitary authority: Brighton and Hove
- Ceremonial county: East Sussex
- Region: South East
- Country: England
- Sovereign state: United Kingdom
- Post town: Hove
- Postcode district: BN3
- Dialling code: 01273
- Police: Sussex
- Fire: East Sussex
- Ambulance: South East Coast
- UK Parliament: Hove and Portslade

Aldrington is an area in the city of Brighton and Hove in the ceremonial county of East Sussex, England. It was formerly a civil parish. For centuries it was meadow land along the English Channel stretching west from the old village of Hove to the old mouth of the River Adur, and it is now a prosperous residential area integrated within Hove.

== History ==
There was Roman activity and settlement in the area. The Anglo-Saxons gave it the name Ealdhere's Tun — Ealdhere's farm — and the name appears in the Domesday Book as Eldretune. During the High Middle Ages the fortunes of the village waned as the mouth of the River Adur moved west to Portslade, and as acres of land were lost to the sea. By the end of the sixteenth century, its church dedicated to St Leonard was a ruin, and though the population rallied for a time in the seventeenth century by the 1831 census, the area recorded a population of just two. In 1951 the parish had a population of 22,925. On 1 April 1974 the parish was abolished.

=== Nineteenth century ===
The area of Aldrington began to be developed from the late nineteenth century as a westward extension of Hove. The church of St Leonard was restored in 1878, and incorporates parts of the medieval structure. Aldrington was amalgamated with Hove in 1894. The ground plan of Aldrington was set out on a grid-iron system, most unusual within England. The main artery running east–west is New Church Road, a broad and straight residential road. Originally called simply Church Road. it was renamed New Church Road to reflect the opening of St Philip's Church in 1895. Parallel with it to the south is Kingsway (previously called Shoreham Road) which runs along the edge of the sea. Parallel to the north is Portland Road.

== Aldrington today ==
The identity of Aldrington is as a residential area of Hove. It is characterised by late nineteenth and early twentieth century villa style houses on tree-lined roads. In places, particularly along the sea-front, are more recent apartment blocks. Channings (pictured) is typical of 20th century development; the colour scheme reflects the ubiquitous Brighton and Hove blue-green.

== Transport ==
=== Rail ===
Aldrington railway station (formerly known at various times as Aldrington Halt, and as Dyke Junction) is located on the West Coastway Line west of Hove and east of Portslade.
