= Heneage =

Heneage may refer to:

- Baron Heneage, a title in the Peerage of the United Kingdom
- Heneage knot, a decorative heraldic knot

== People with the surname ==
- Algernon Heneage (1833–1915), Royal Navy officer dubbed "Pompo"
- Arthur Heneage (1881–1971), British Conservative Party politician
- Clement Walker Heneage VC (1831–1901), English recipient of the Victoria Cross
- Edward Heneage, 1st Baron Heneage PC JP DL (1840–1922), British Liberal and Liberal Unionist politician
- Edward Heneage (cricketer) (1775–1810), English first-class cricketer
- George Heneage (1800–1864), British Whig and later Conservative Party politician
- George Heneage (priest) (1483–1549), Dean of Lincoln, England
- George Heneage (16th century MP), MP for Great Grimsby and Orford, England
- Harry R. Heneage (1884–1950), American football player and college athletics administrator
- James Heneage, British historical fiction writer
- John Heneage (c. 1485–1557), MP for Great Grimsby, England
- John Heneage Jesse (1815–1874), English historian
- Thomas Heneage (1533–1595), MP for Boston at the 1563 Parliament of England

== People with the given name ==
- Heneage Finch, 1st Earl of Aylesford, PC, KC (1649–1719), English lawyer and statesman
- Heneage Finch, 1st Earl of Nottingham, PC (1621–1682), Lord Chancellor of England
- Heneage Finch, 2nd Earl of Aylesford ( 1683–1757), served as the Master of the Jewel Office
- Heneage Finch, 3rd Earl of Aylesford (1715–1777), British peer and politician
- Heneage Finch, 3rd Earl of Winchilsea (1628–1689), of Eastwell, Kent, 3rd Earl of Winchilsea
- Heneage Finch, 4th Earl of Aylesford (1751–1812), British peer and landscape artist
- Heneage Finch, 5th Earl of Aylesford (1786–1859), British peer and Officer in the Light Dragoons
- Heneage Finch, 6th Earl of Aylesford (1824–1871), British peer and politician
- Heneage Finch, 7th Earl of Aylesford (1849–1885), British peer and friend of the Prince of Wales
- Heneage Finch (surveyor), (1793–1850), known for his surveying work in the Colony of New South Wales, Australia
- Heneage Gibbes (1837–1912), British pathologist
- Heneage Legge (1788–1844), MP for Banbury, England
- Heneage Legge (1845–1911), MP for St George's Hanover Square, nephew of the above
- Heneage Montagu (1675–1698), younger son of Robert Montagu, 3rd Earl of Manchester and Anne Yelverton
- Heneage Wheeler (fl. 1904), cricketer who played one first-class match for Somerset
- Heneage Wileman (1888–1926), English footballer

== See also ==
- John Walker-Heneage (1730–1806), MP for Cricklade, England
