= St Augustine's Church, Brighton =

St Augustine's Centre
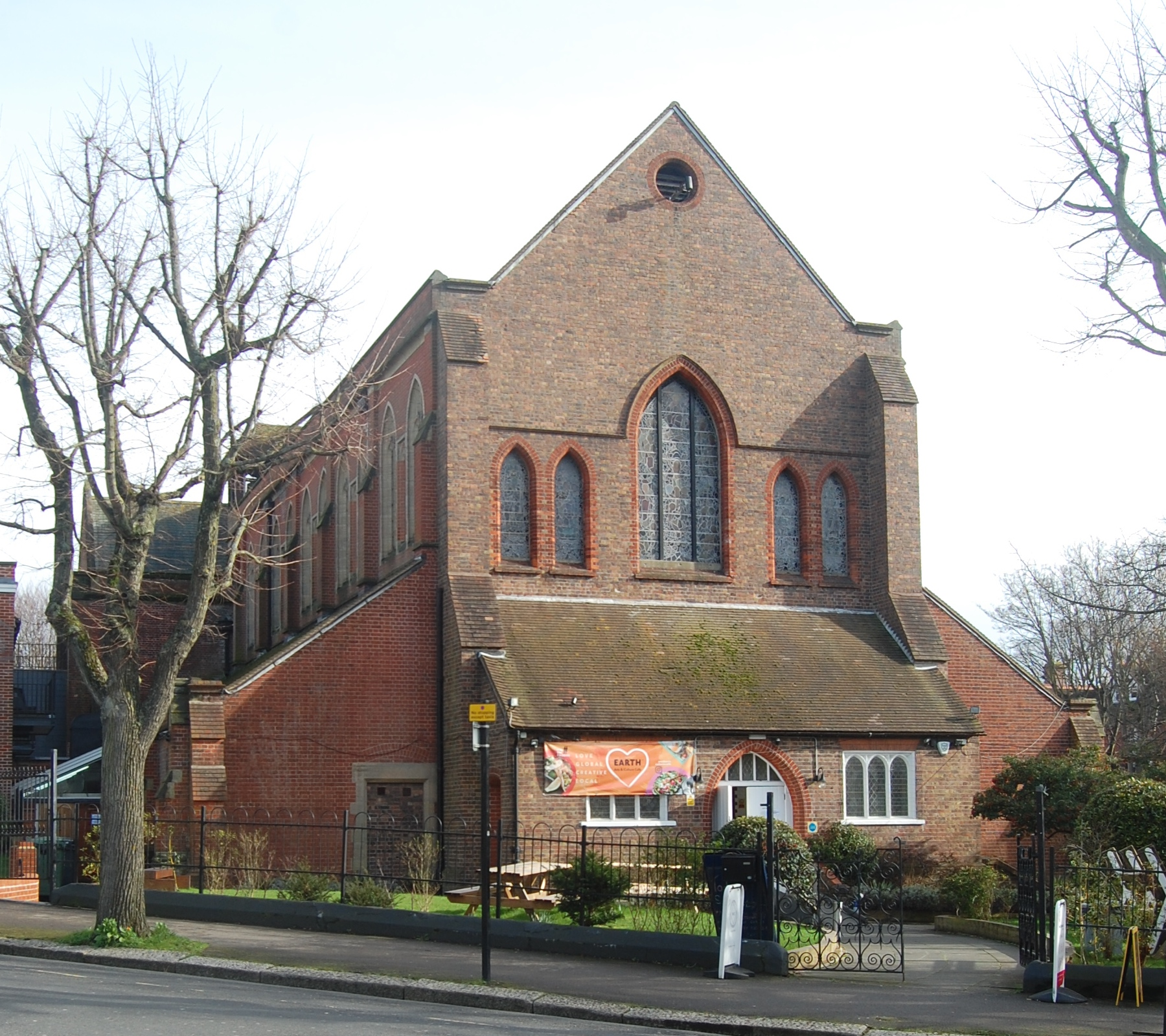
- The church from the west
- St Augustine's Centre
- 50.8383°N 0.1400°W
- Location: Stanford Avenue, Brighton, Brighton and Hove BN1 6EA
- Country: England
- Denomination: Anglican

History
- Status: Church
- Founded: 1896
- Dedication: Augustine of Hippo

Architecture
- Functional status: Redundant
- Heritage designation: Grade II listed
- Designated: 22 May 1995
- Architect(s): Granville Streatfield, Thomas Graham Jackson (consultant)
- Style: Perpendicular Gothic
- Completed: 1914
- Closed: January 2003

Specifications
- Materials: Red brick

Administration
- Province: Canterbury
- Diocese: Chichester
- Archdeaconry: Chichester
- Deanery: Rural Deanery of Brighton
- Parish: Preston, St John the Evangelist with Brighton, St Augustine and St Saviour

St Augustine's Church is a former Anglican church in Brighton, part of the English city of Brighton and Hove. It is close to the Preston Park and Round Hill areas in the central northern part of the city. Built in 1896 and extended in 1914, its parish was extended after a nearby church closed, but in 2003 it was declared redundant itself. The building, which is listed at Grade II in view of its architectural importance, for a few years from 2004 the building was leased by the Elim Pentecostal Church. The Pentecostal congregation made free-standing internal changes to create internal spaces which could be heated in winter, but did not touch the fabric of the building. It is now the St Augustine's Community Arts Centre, encompassing a cafe, exhibition space, offices, and other rooms.

== History ==
Brighton and Hove, which were then separate towns, experienced a surge in churchbuilding during the Victorian era, but St Augustine's church was a relative latecomer. Its construction was a consequence of the gradual development of housing around Preston Village—an ancient village about 1.5 miles (2.4 km) north-northwest of central Brighton. It was surrounded by large estates whose land was owned by families such as the Stanfords. The village became popular with daytrippers from Brighton in the early 19th century, with its large park, tea-rooms and other attractions, but residential development did not start until the 1860s, when the Stanford estate began to be broken up and sold.

The family imposed conditions on the type and quality of development allowed. For about 40 years from the mid-1860s, streets of large villas, middle-class terraced houses and larger detached houses were built, moving steadily southwards and eastwards from the old village centre towards the northern boundary of Brighton itself. One of the main roads in the area was Stanford Avenue, laid out in the 1880s. Semi-detached villas were built first, followed by other larger houses over the next 20 years. There were no Anglican churches in the vicinity, so architect Granville E. Streatfield was appointed to design and build one.

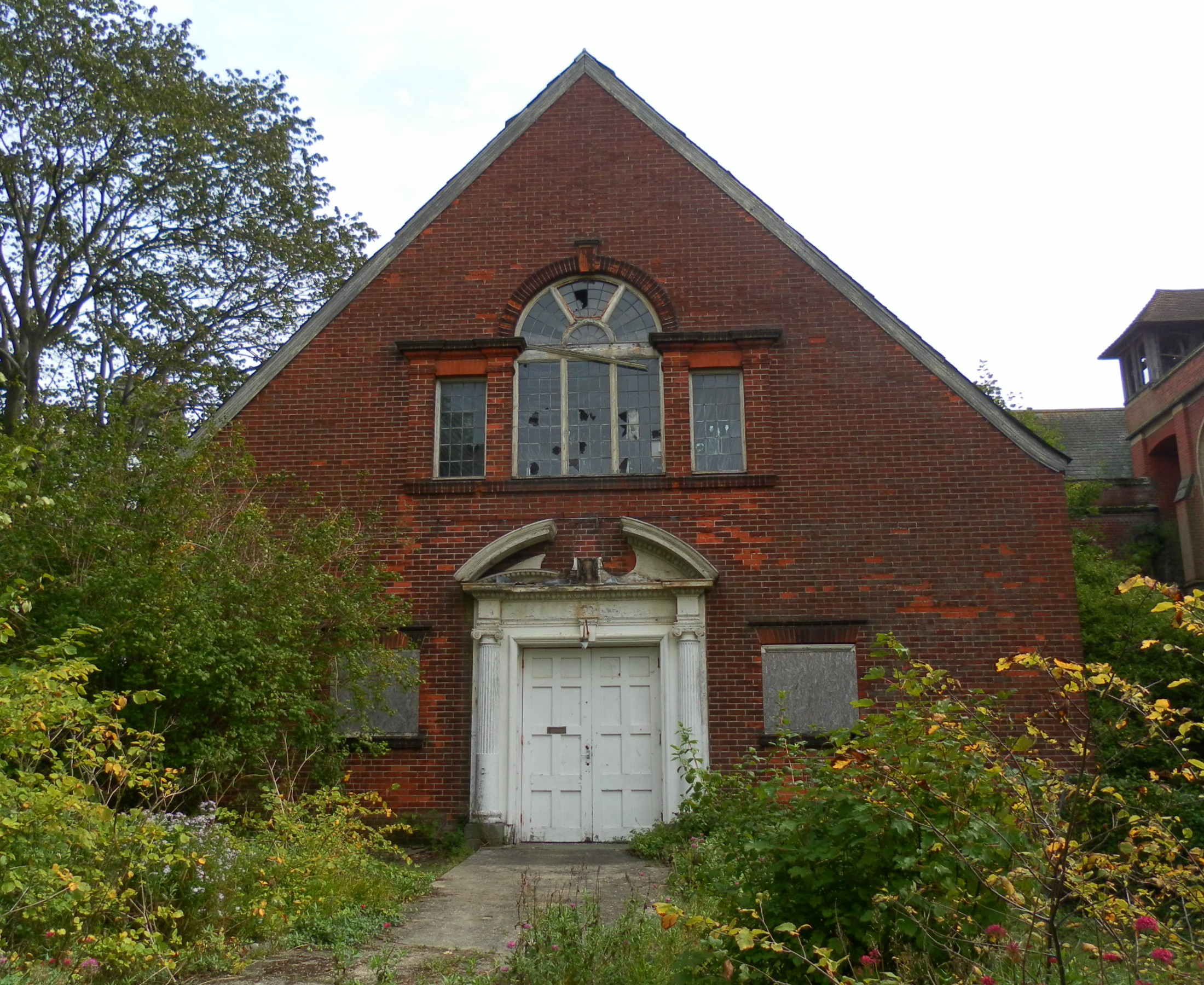
A church hall was added on the north side in 1901.

The church was built in two parts—in 1896 and 1914—and a church hall was added separately as well. Streatfield started by building a long nave with aisles and a clerestory; the church opened in this form in 1896. A hall, commemorating Queen Victoria, was added on the north side in 1901, and Charles Eamer Kempe, a prolific Victorian stained glass designer, provided some stained glass windows for the church at the same time. The church was completed in 1913–14 by Streatfield, this time with Sir Thomas Graham Jackson acting as a consultant; Streatfield was a pupil of Jackson's. This project added a chancel and apse, a large ambulatory and a Lady chapel.

St Saviour's Church was a slightly earlier church which stood (at 50.8360°N 0.1339°W) on Ditchling Road in the Round Hill area of Brighton, southeast of St Augustine's. It was built by local architects Edmund Scott and Frank Cawthorn in 1886 in the Early English style, in flint, stone and red brick. It was extended in 1889, but a proposed tower was never built. Declared redundant and closed in 1981, it was demolished in 1983 and replaced by flats. The former parish was then absorbed by that of St Augustine's Church. The Diocese of Chichester in turn declared St Augustine's redundant as from 22 January 2003, and it officially closed in 2003. It has stood empty since then. The parish, now called St Augustine and St Saviour, was added to that of St John the Evangelist's Church, the parish church of Preston Village, whose parish was renamed "Preston, St John the Evangelist with Brighton, St Augustine and St Saviour" accordingly.

In the early 2000s, the Immanuel Community Church in the Hanover area of Brighton merged with the former Elim Pentecostal church near Preston Park and consolidated their services on the Hanover site. That church was destroyed by fire, and the former St Augustine's Church was offered to the community. They worshipped there until 2009 before moving to the Fountain Centre in Patcham. The church has purchased the site of St Augustine's and intends to redevelop the building and move back.

St Augustine's Church was listed at Grade II by English Heritage on 22 May 1995. It is one of 1,124 Grade II-listed buildings and structures, and 1,218 listed buildings of all grades, in the city of Brighton and Hove.

As of 2014 the church building is undergoing conversion into The St. Augustine's Centre, a multi-purpose community development including apartments, coffee lounge, bistro/cafeteria, and offices.

== Architecture ==
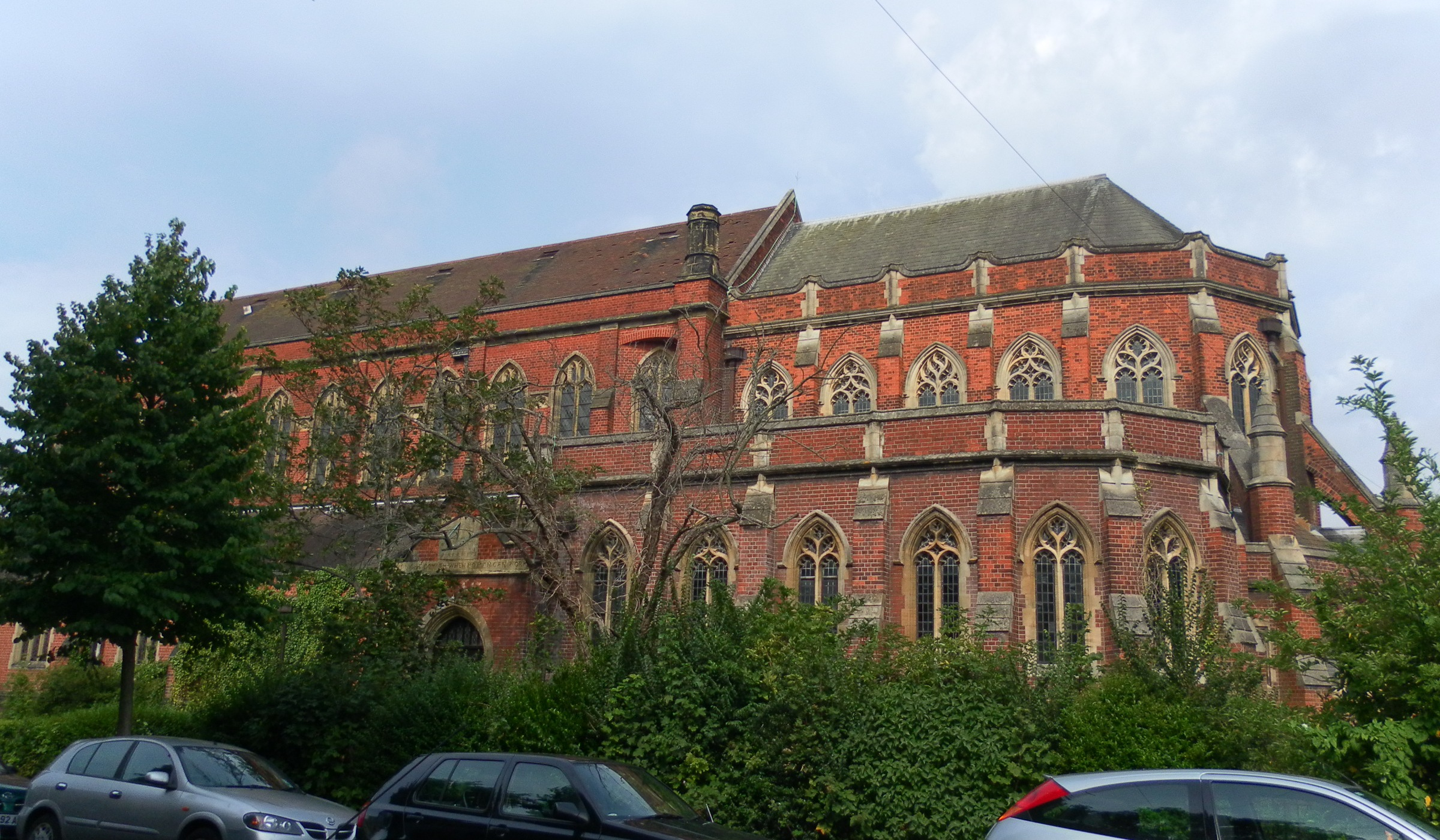
The church has an apsidal end with flying buttresses.

Granville Streatfield designed St Augustine's in the Perpendicular Gothic style using red brick with stone dressings. The brick is laid in a Flemish bond pattern, and the roof is tiled. The nave has 5½ bays, and the later chancel is also quite long (four bays). It terminates in an ornately designed apse at the east end; in contrast, the plain west end was never completed and the tower planned for that end by Streatfield was not built.

The entrance is at the west end, in a small porch above which are two lancet windows and a central arched window. There is another porch on the south side (facing Stanford Avenue), with a sundial bearing the inscription the night cometh when no man can work (John 9:4). The nave has pairs of lancets all the way round, separated by brick pilasters. There is a series of flying buttresses around the exterior wall of the chancel, which also has lancet windows with tracery work. The Lady chapel has similar features.

== See also ==
- Grade II listed buildings in Brighton and Hove: S
- List of places of worship in Brighton and Hove
- Media related to St Augustine's Church, Brighton at Wikimedia Commons

== Bibliography ==
- Carder, Timothy (1990). The Encyclopaedia of Brighton. Lewes: East Sussex County Libraries. ISBN 0-86147-315-9.
- Elleray, D. Robert (1981). The Victorian Churches of Sussex. Chichester: Phillimore & Co. ISBN 0-85033-378-4.
- Elleray, D. Robert (2004). Sussex Places of Worship. Worthing: Optimus Books. ISBN 0-9533132-7-1.
