= St John the Evangelist's Church, Preston Village =

St John the Evangelist's Church
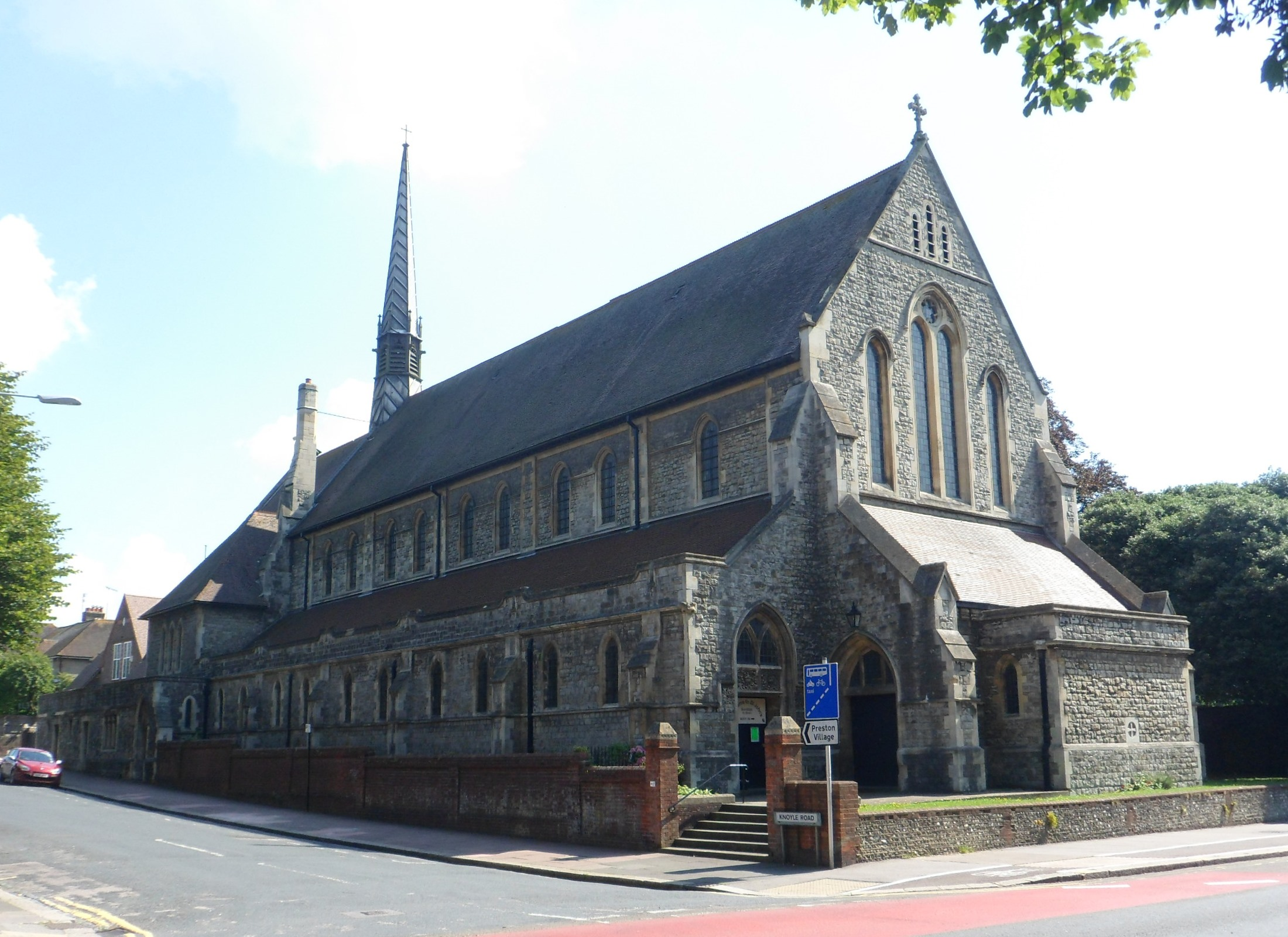
- The church from the northwest
- St John the Evangelist's Church
- 50.8445°N 0.1509°W
- Location: Knoyle Road/Preston Road, Preston Village, Brighton and Hove BN1 6RB
- Country: England
- Denomination: Anglican
- Website: www.brightonstjohn.org.uk/

History
- Status: Active
- Founded: 16 October 1901
- Dedication: John the Evangelist
- Dedicated: 26 October 1902

Architecture
- Functional status: Parish church
- Heritage designation: Grade II listed
- Designated: 26 August 1999
- Architect: Arthur Blomfield
- Style: Early English Revival
- Groundbreaking: June 1901
- Completed: 1926

Specifications
- Capacity: 800

Administration
- Province: Canterbury
- Diocese: Chichester
- Archdeaconry: Chichester
- Deanery: Rural Deanery of Brighton
- Parish: Preston, St John with St Augustine and St Saviour

St John the Evangelist's Church is an Anglican church in the Preston Village area of Brighton, in the English city of Brighton and Hove. The Grade II listed building, designed by Sir Arthur Blomfield, was started in 1901 but did not take its present form for another quarter of a century. In the meantime, the nearby parish church of Preston was severely damaged by fire, and the new church was granted the parish church status which it still retains.

== History ==
The village of Preston was established on a downland site 1.5 miles (2.4 km) north-northwest of Brighton before the time of the Domesday Book of 1086. St Peter's Church was its original parish church. No trace remains of the building mentioned in the Domesday Book: it was rebuilt in about 1260 in flint with a chancel, nave and tower. The village, based around a crossroads and a manor house, Preston Manor, became part of the Borough of Brighton on 31 October 1873.

The Stanford family, who owned most of the land in the area, sold it for residential development in the mid-1860s. Rapid growth ensued, and the old church became inadequate for the increasing population. In 1899, the new vicar proposed extending the church, but the church council and local people felt that altering the ancient building would be inappropriate. Instead, the decision was taken to build a new church on land occupied by the garden of the vicarage.

Work began quickly: the site, at the junction of Preston Road and Knoyle Road, was prepared in the summer of 1901, and the Bishop of Chichester Ernest Roland Wilberforce laid the foundation stone on 16 October 1901. Sir Arthur Blomfield designed the church, and the Crawley-based building firm of James Longley built it. Construction work continued into the next year; the church officially opened after it was dedicated on 26 October 1902.

At the time, St Peter's Church still held its ancient status as the parish church of Preston. However, after it was devastated by a serious fire on 23 June 1906, the church authorities decided to transfer parish church status to St John the Evangelist's Church. This was completed at the end of 1908.

A temporary church hall made of iron existed until 1913, when a permanent hall was completed. In 1927, a parishioner donated money for another hall to be built next to it. The previous year, the church itself had been extended with the addition of a chancel.

== Architecture ==
Sir Arthur Blomfield designed the church in the Early English style. It is very long: it has a nave of 5¼ bays, and there is only a slight change in the roofline to the chancel beyond it. At the east end of the nave, where the roof profile changes, there is a small flèche made of wood and lead. The exterior is stone, faced with rock and dressed with stone blocks. The roof is tiled.

The church has a chancel, chancel arch, nave with aisles on the north and south sides, vestry at the northeast corner, baptistery, buttressed narthex (entered from the nave through arches in the buttresses, beneath an overall arch and tympanum) and clerestories above the aisles. Both the aisles and the clerestories have five pairs of lancet windows. Interior features include a sedilia, organ chamber, choir stalls, chancel screen, ornate multi-sided pulpit with green marble work, stone reredos designed as a triptych and depicting the Ascension of Jesus, and a marble font depicting an angel kneeling with a shell.

== The church today ==
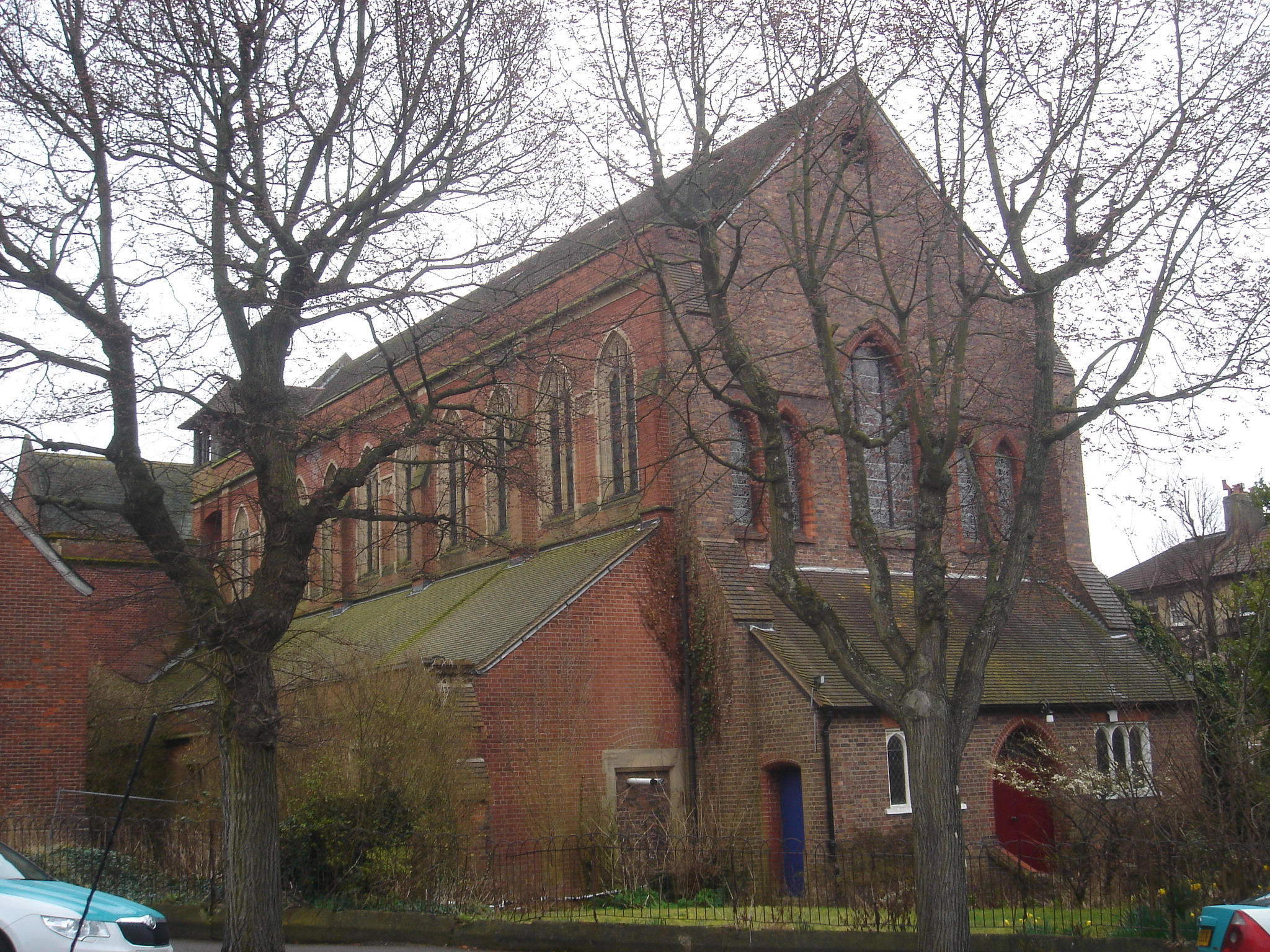
St Augustine's Church, whose former parish is now part of St John the Evangelist's

St John the Evangelist's Church was listed at Grade II by English Heritage on 26 August 1999. It is one of 1,124 Grade II-listed buildings and structures, and 1,218 listed buildings of all grades, in the city of Brighton and Hove.

The parish was extended in the early 21st century after the closure of St Augustine's Church, which opened in 1896 on Stanford Avenue at the south end of Preston Park. It was declared redundant in 2002 and its parish joined St John the Evangelist's. The parish is officially named "St John with St Augustine and St Saviour", as St Augustine's former parish was itself extended in the 1980s to absorb that of St Saviour's Church – an 1886 church on the west side of Ditchling Road, at the junction of Round Hill Road (at 50.8360°N 0.1339°W), which was closed in 1981 and demolished two years later. The parish boundaries are the railway line between Preston Park station and New England Road, Viaduct Road, Ditchling Road, Preston Drove, Osborne Road, Balfour Road, Surrenden Road, Peacock Lane and London Road.

== See also ==
- Grade II listed buildings in Brighton and Hove: S
- List of places of worship in Brighton and Hove
- Media related to St John the Evangelist's Church, Preston, Brighton at Wikimedia Commons

== Bibliography ==
- Carder, Timothy (1990). The Encyclopaedia of Brighton. Lewes: East Sussex County Libraries. ISBN 0-86147-315-9.
- Dale, Antony (1989). Brighton Churches. London: Routledge. ISBN 0-415-00863-8.
- Elleray, D. Robert (2004). Sussex Places of Worship. Worthing: Optimus Books. ISBN 0-9533132-7-1.
- Nairn, Ian; Pevsner, Nikolaus (1965). The Buildings of England: Sussex. Harmondsworth: Penguin Books. ISBN 0-14-071028-0.
- Preston Village Millennium Project (2004). Preston: Downland Village to Brighton Suburb. Brighton: Brighton Books Publishing. ISBN 1-901454-07-X.
