= St Mary's Church, Preston Park =

St Mary's Church
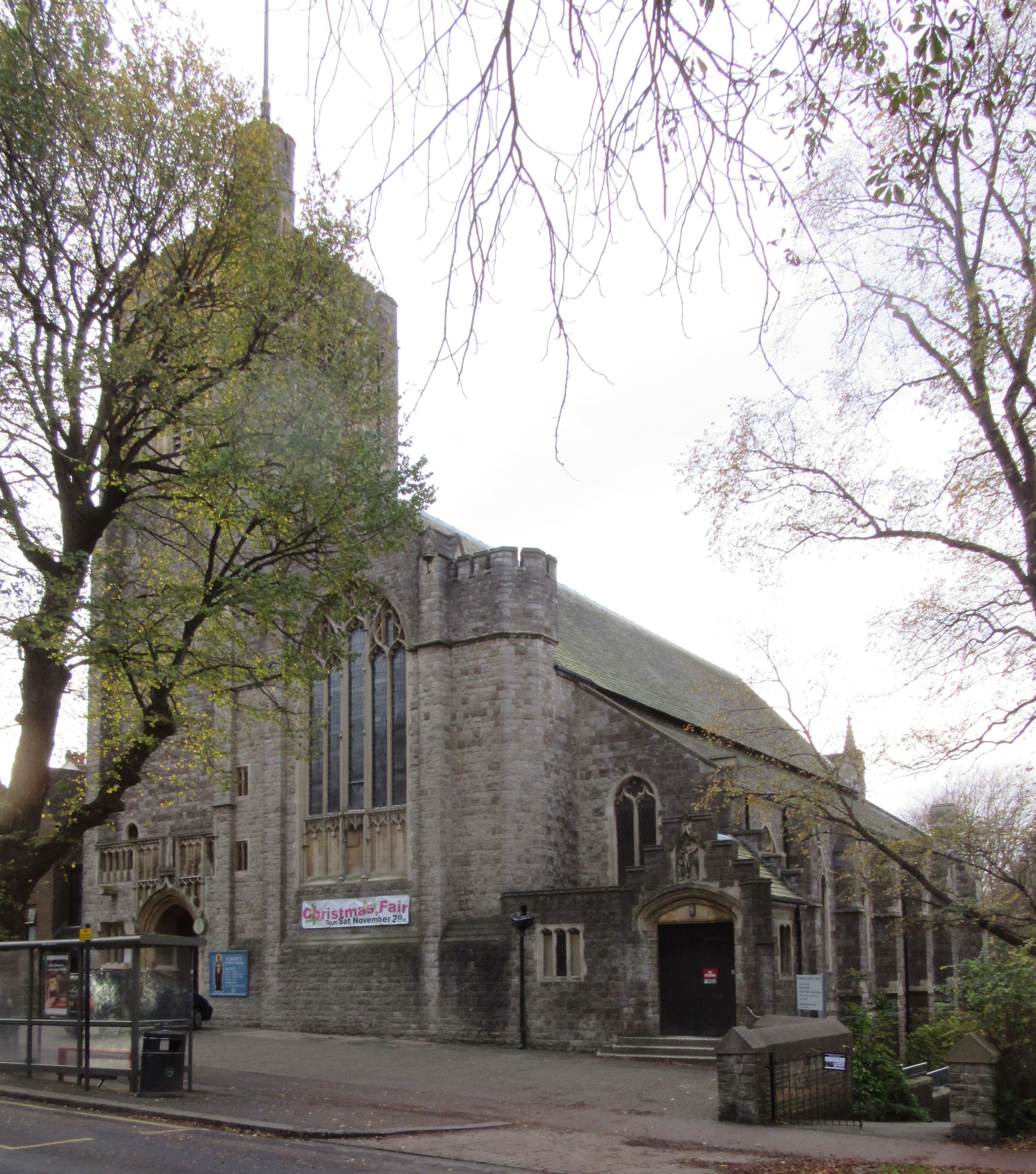
- St Mary's Church
- 50.8447°N 0.1458°W
- OS grid reference: TQ 30627 06664
- Location: Preston Village, East Sussex
- Country: England
- Denomination: Roman Catholic
- Website: https://www.brightonstmary.com/

History
- Status: Active
- Dedication: Blessed Virgin Mary

Architecture
- Functional status: Parish church
- Heritage designation: Grade II listed
- Designated: 4 June 2015
- Architect: Percy Aiden Lamb
- Style: Gothic Revival
- Groundbreaking: 9 August 1910
- Completed: 7 April 1912

Administration
- Province: Southwark
- Diocese: Arundel and Brighton
- Deanery: Brighton and Hove

St Mary's Church is a Roman Catholic Parish church in the Preston Village area of Brighton and Hove, East Sussex, England. It was built from 1910 to 1912 in the Arts and Crafts style of Gothic Revival architecture. It is situated on the Surrenden Road on the corner with Preston Drove opposite Preston Park. It was designed by Percy Aiden Lamb, a student of Edward Goldie, and is a Grade II listed building.

== History ==
=== Foundation ===
In 1903, the Sisters of Charity and Christian Instruction of Nevers moved into the Preston Village area of Brighton. They did so to escape the secularisation occurring in France at the time. At first they worked within the parish of St Joseph's Church in Brighton. In 1904, the sisters were invited by the Bishop of Southwark, Peter Amigo, to start a convent school in the Withdean area of the city. Their convent chapel also served as a place of worship for the local Catholic population. In 1906, a Fr Frederick Hopper became chaplain to the convent. With the increasing congregation he started the process of getting a new Catholic church built in the area.

=== Construction ===
In 1907, the site for St Mary's Church was bought from the lands of Preston Manor. Catherine and Denis Broderick gave money for the building of the church. On 9 August 1910, the foundation stone was laid. In 1912, construction was finished and the first Mass was said in the church on 7 April 1912. Construction was halted then because of a disagreement because Broderick wanted the sanctuary built first, instead of Hopper's plans of building a tower. When the church was opened, a tower was built, but the east side of the church with its fittings were left unfinished.

The architect was Percy Aidan Lamb. In 1907, not long before being commissioned to design St Mary's Church, he started his architectural firm in London. Before that he trained with Edward Goldie. From 1895 to 1907, he worked for John Francis Bentley on the construction of Westminster Cathedral. He built St Mary's Church in the Gothic Revival style with Arts and Crafts movement influences. In the church, he also designed the font made of onyx. It was made by J. Whitehead & Son, crafted from a pair of columns originally constructed for Westminster Cathedral.

=== Developments ===
In 1918, the old high altar was installed in the church. It was from the old Xaverian College in Brighton. The pews in the church were made by the congregation and were inspired by the pews in St Michael and All Angels Church in Harbledown, Kent. In the 1950s, the interior was renovated. The floor was relaid and the reredos was removed. In 1978, the presbytery was built to the north of the church and the sanctuary was added. It was built in the shape of a polygon and both were designed by Patrick Foley. In 1979, the stained glass window in the east side of the church was added. It was designed by Cox & Barnard.

In 2004, with funding from Cyril Cassidy and plans by the priest, Canon Oliver Heaney, the construction of a parish centre was proposed. In 2007, the Cassidy Centre was opened by the Bishop of Arundel and Brighton, Kieran Conry. It is attached to the east end of the church and designed by Stephen Wright from the Brighton-based Morgan Carn firm. They also worked on the Divine Motherhood and St Francis of Assisi Church in Midhurst. That year, the stained glass window behind the font was added. It was designed by Caroline Benyon who worked out of the Glass House in Fulham. In 2011, the convent, from which St Mary's Church was founded, closed.

== Parish ==
The church has three Sunday Masses, they are at 6:00 pm on Saturday evening and at 10:00 am and 12 midday on Sunday. There are weekday Masses at 10:00 am on Tuesday, Wednesday, Thursday, Friday and Saturday.

== Interior ==
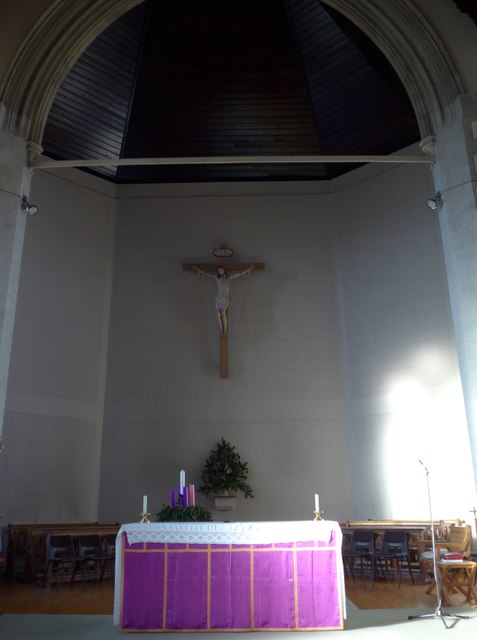
Altar

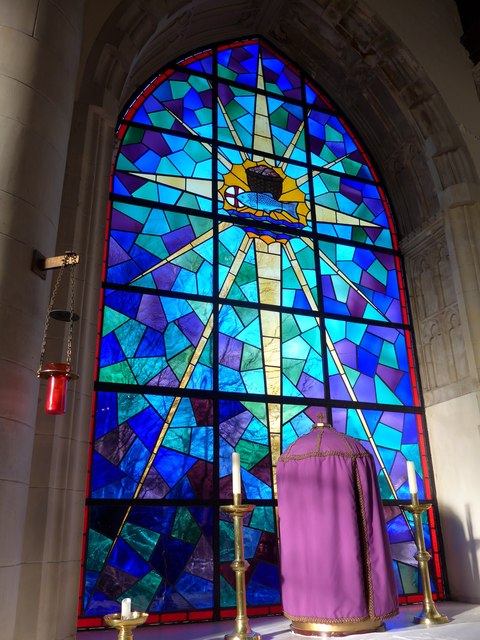
East window and tabernacle

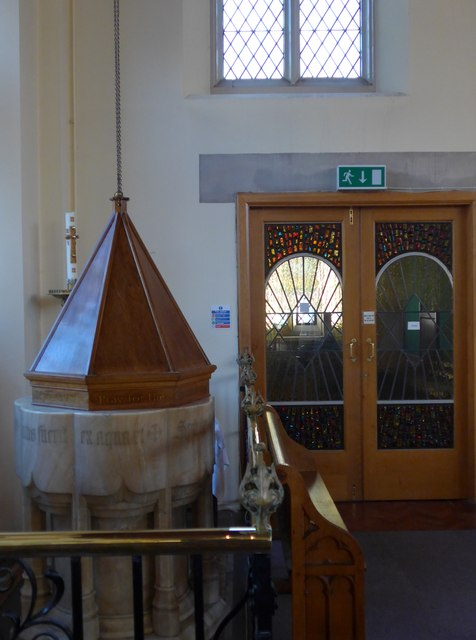
Baptismal font

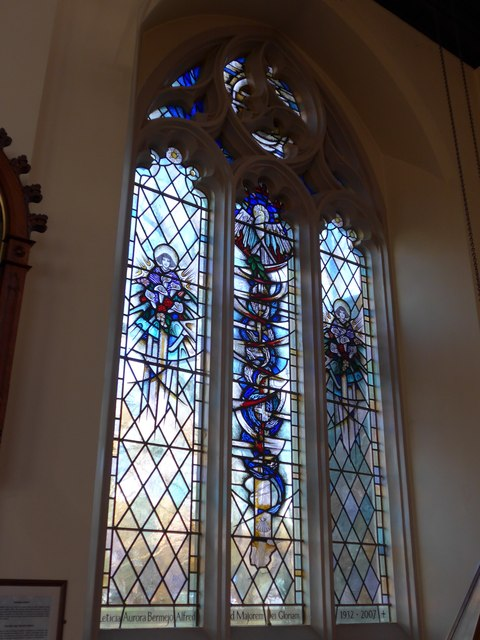
Baptismal font window

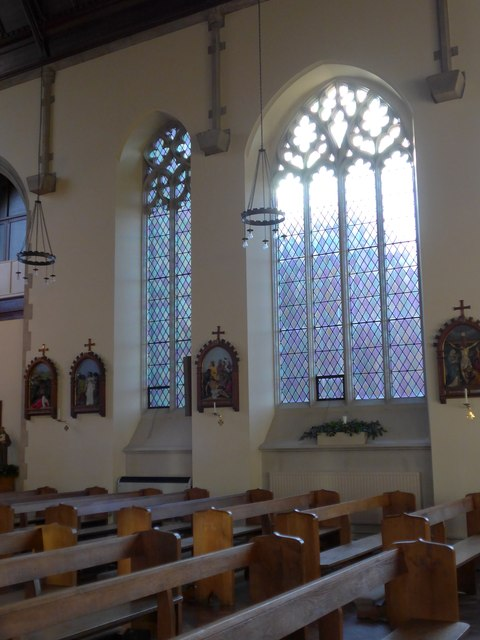
Pews

== See also ==
- Grade II listed buildings in Brighton and Hove: S
- List of places of worship in Brighton and Hove
- Roman Catholic Diocese of Arundel and Brighton
