= Arthur Wileman =

English footballer

Personal information
- Full name: Arthur Harold Wileman
- Date of birth: 1 January 1886
- Place of birth: Newhall, England
- Date of death: 28 April 1918 (aged 32)
- Place of death: near Voormezeele, Belgium
- Height: 5 ft 7 in (1.70 m)
- Position: Inside right

Senior career*
| Years | Team | Apps | (Gls) |
- Newhall Swifts
| 1904–1906 | Gresley Rovers | | |
| 1906–1909 | Burton United | 8 | (2) |
| 1909–1911 | Chelsea | 14 | (5) |
| 1911–1912 | Millwall Athletic | | |
| 1912–1915 | Luton Town | 72 | (42) |
- Southend United
- * Club domestic league appearances and goals

Arthur Harold Wileman MM (1 January 1886 – 28 April 1918), sometimes known as Nippy Wileman, was an English professional footballer who played as an inside right in the Football League for Chelsea and Burton United.

== Personal life ==
Wileman's brother Heneage was also a footballer and the brothers played together at Burton United, Chelsea and Southend United. On 16 December 1914, four months after Britain's entry into the First World War, Wileman enlisted in the Football Battalion. After transferring to the Royal Sussex Regiment, he was sent to the front in March 1916. Wileman rose to the rank of sergeant and was awarded a Military Medal for bravery in the field in January 1918. On 28 April 1918, Wileman was killed along with two others during a reconnaissance patrol in the vicinity of the Elzenwalle Chateau, Voormezeele, West Flanders on 28 April 1918. His name is inscribed on the Tyne Cot Memorial to the Missing.

== Career statistics ==
Appearances and goals by club, season and competition
| Club | Season | League | | | FA Cup | | Total | |
| Club | Season | Division | Apps | Goals | Apps | Goals | Apps | Goals |
|---|---|---|---|---|---|---|---|---|
| Burton United | 1905–06 | Second Division | 8 | 2 | — | | 8 | 2 |
| Chelsea | 1909–10 | First Division | 14 | 4 | 0 | 0 | 14 | 4 |
| Luton Town | 1912–13 | Southern League Second Division | 23 | 8 | 2 | 1 | 25 | 9 |
| Luton Town | 1913–14 | Southern League Second Division | 24 | 27 | 3 | 1 | 27 | 28 |
| Luton Town | 1914–15 | Southern League Second Division | 25 | 7 | 4 | 3 | 29 | 10 |
| Luton Town | Total | | 72 | 42 | 9 | 5 | 81 | 47 |
| Career total | | | 94 | 48 | 9 | 5 | 103 | 53 |

== Honours ==
Luton Town

- Southern League Second Division second-place promotion: 1913–14
