= St Peter's Church, Preston Village =

St Peter's Church
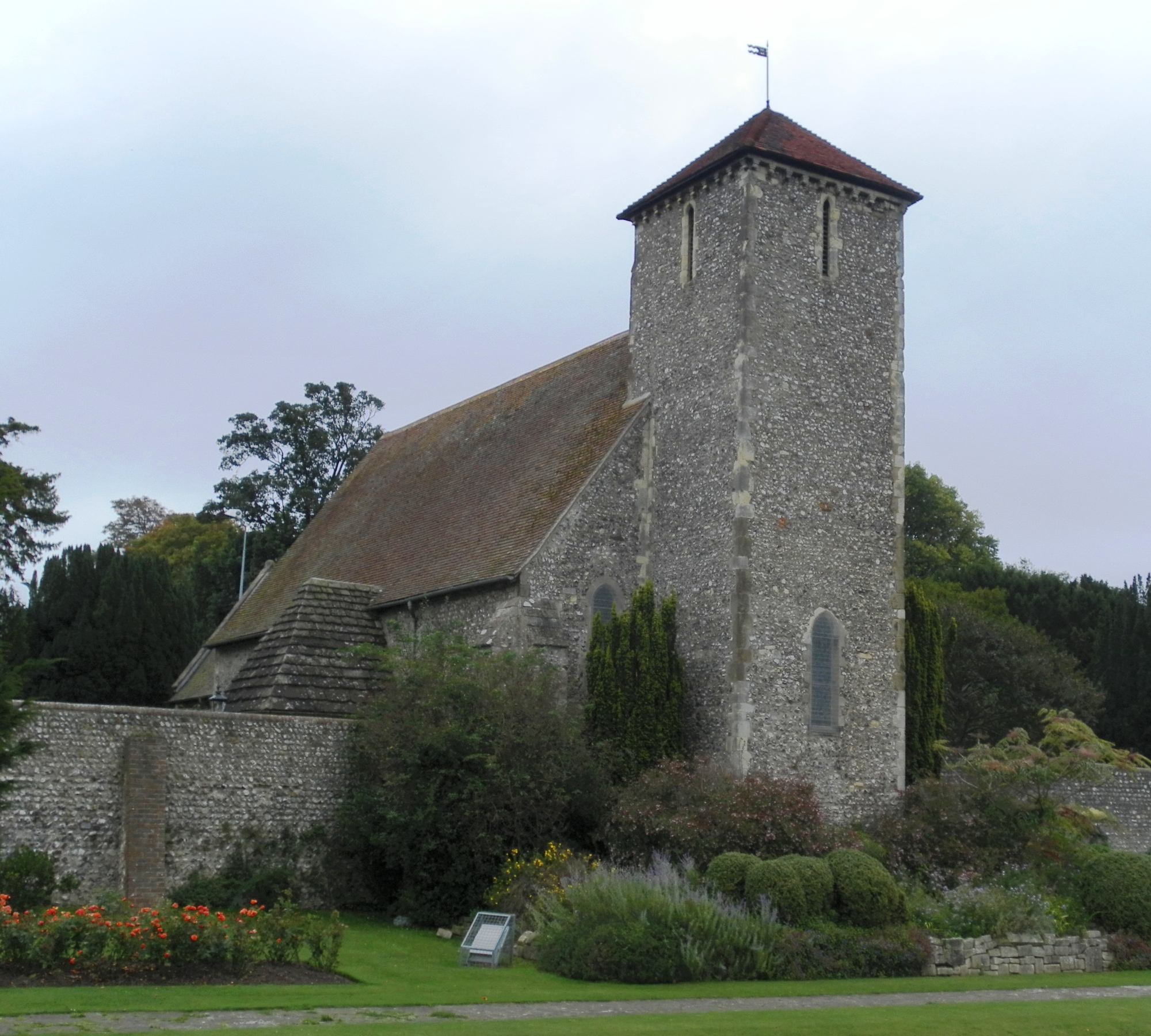
- The church from the northwest
- St Peter's Church
- 50.8423°N 0.1495°W
- Location: Grounds of Preston Manor, Preston Drove, Preston, Brighton and Hove
- Country: England
- Denomination: Anglican

History
- Status: Former parish church
- Dedication: Saint Peter

Architecture
- Functional status: Redundant
- Heritage designation: Grade II* listed
- Designated: 13 October 1952
- Style: Early English
- Closed: 1988

St Peter's Church is a former Anglican church in the Preston Village area of Brighton, in the English city of Brighton and Hove. The 13th-century building, standing on the site of two older churches, was restored in the late 19th century and again after a serious fire in 1906. It was the parish church of Preston until 1908, when the newly built St John the Evangelist's Church gained this status. The Diocese of Chichester declared St Peter's redundant in 1990, and it is now owned by the Churches Conservation Trust. It has Grade II* listed status, reflecting its architectural and historical importance.

== History ==
The village of Preston was established on a downland site 1.5 miles (2.4 km) north-northwest of Brighton before the time of the Domesday Book. At that time, it was known as Prestetone (an Anglo-Saxon name) and had a church, a mill and a population of about 50. The manor was held by the Bishop of Chichester, who at the time was Stigand of Selsey.

The church mentioned in the Domesday Book was replaced in the mid-13th century by the present structure, which is the third church on the site (a grassed area within the grounds of Preston Manor). It consisted of a chancel, nave with no aisles and a tower at the west end with a shallow pyramidal cap (of the type known as a Sussex Cap), corbel table and narrow lancet windows. Its main feature of interest was a series of 13th- and 14th-century wall paintings around the chancel arch and the nave, which depicted the Nativity of Jesus, Saint Michael weighing the souls of the dead at the Last Judgment, the murder and martyrdom of Thomas Becket, Doubting Thomas, other saints, and the "Noli me tangere" scene at Jesus's Resurrection. They were covered with plaster at the time of the Reformation and were rediscovered in 1830 by the vicar, Reverend Charles Townsend.

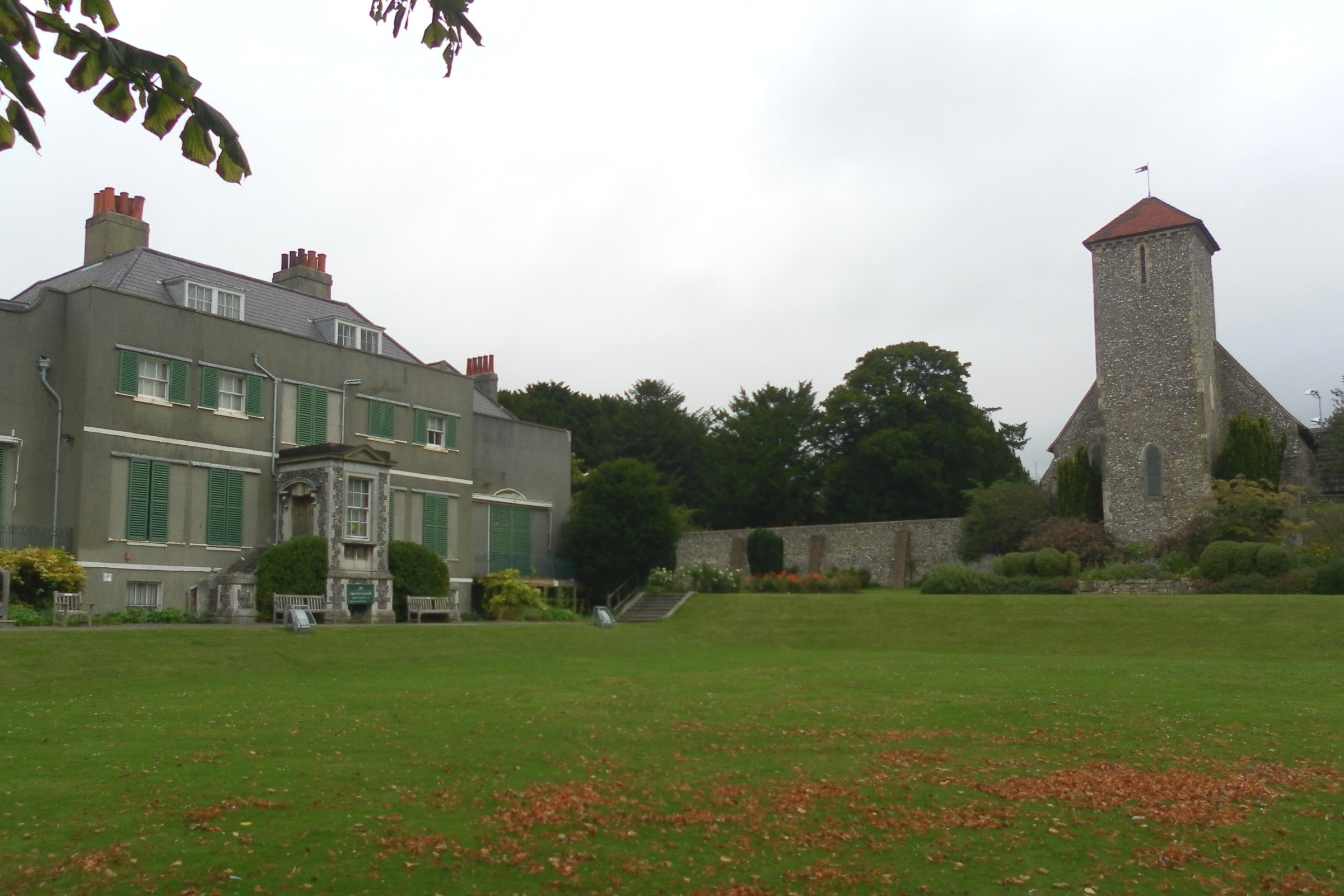
The church overlooks the rear lawns of Preston Manor.

The church was restored and extended in 1872 by architect James Woodman, who added a porch on the north side and a vestry to the south. He also worked on the nave, which has been described as "over-restored". In 1878, Ewan Christian modernised the chancel and its medieval piscina and sedilia. In 1896, Reverend Edward Riley became the vicar; he proposed extending the church to provide more capacity. It was only 50 feet (15 m) long and 26 feet (7.9 m) wide, and its capacity of 250 was inadequate for the rapidly growing population, which had been boosted by the opening of a mainline railway station, the sale of the Stanford family's estate for residential development in the 1860s, and the village's incorporation into the Borough of Brighton in 1873. Parishioners and church officials argued that an enlargement would damage the medieval character of the church and would disturb or damage memorials, and in 1901 the architect Sir Arthur Blomfield was commissioned to build a new church in the garden of the vicarage. St John the Evangelist's Church opened in 1902 with a capacity of 800, but St Peter's retained its ancient status as the parish church of Preston.

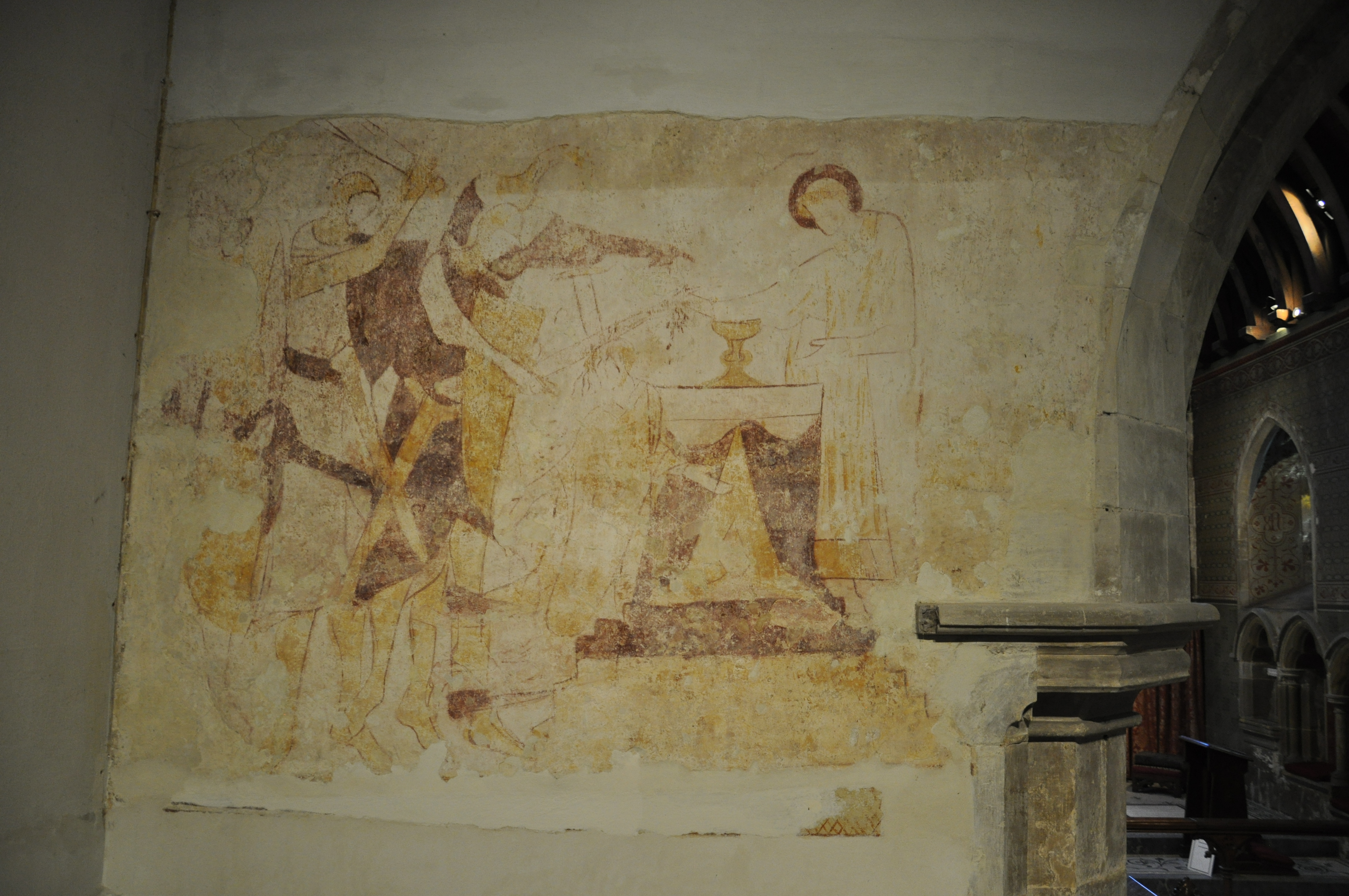
13th-century wall paintings, west side of the knave.

The church was severely damaged by fire on 23 June 1906. The wall paintings suffered particularly badly, such that only fragments of the Nativity, St Michael and Thomas Becket scenes remained—the others were destroyed. The nave, which suffered the most structural damage, was restored between 1906 and 1907 by Philip Mainwaring Johnston, but St Peter's lost its parish church status to St John the Evangelist's the following year. Services were still held at St Peter's until 1988, when the Diocese of Chichester closed it; on 1 June 1990 it was officially declared redundant and was passed to the Redundant Churches Fund (now called the Churches Conservation Trust). The Trust opens the church to the public every day from 10.00am to 3.00pm. The church is available for hire from the Trust for concerts and exhibitions.

St Peter's Church was listed at Grade II* by English Heritage on 13 October 1952. As of February 2001, it was one of 70 Grade II*-listed buildings and structures, and 1,218 listed buildings of all grades, in the city of Brighton and Hove.

== Architecture ==
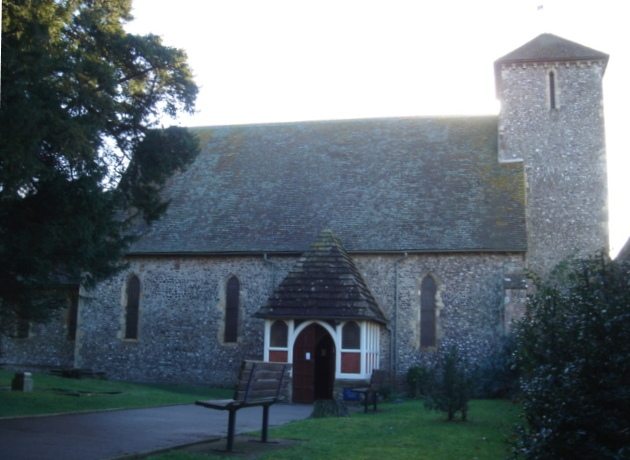
James Woodman added a porch on the north side in 1872.

St Peter's Church is a flint building dressed with stone and with a roof of tiles, standing in a prominent position next to Preston Manor on higher ground than the rest of Preston. Built in the Early English style, it has a series of broad lancet windows—three on each side of the nave, and also in the chancel. Most have been restored from their original state. The tower at the west end is narrow and relatively short; it has much narrow lancet windows and contains three bells, one of which may be 15th-century. In its present form, the church consists of a chancel with barrel roof and chamfered arch, nave with no aisles, vestry with an elaborate chimney, and a timber-framed, hipped-roofed porch. Ewan Christian's renovations in 1878 added a set of intricately carved choir stalls; one of the carvings represents a Native American. There are memorial tablets and stained glass windows commemorating members of the Stanford family. A reredos was added after the 1907 restoration. The altar is formed from a table-tomb—the burial place of Edward Eldrington (or Elrington), the lord of the Preston Manor who died in 1515.

== Burials and memorials ==
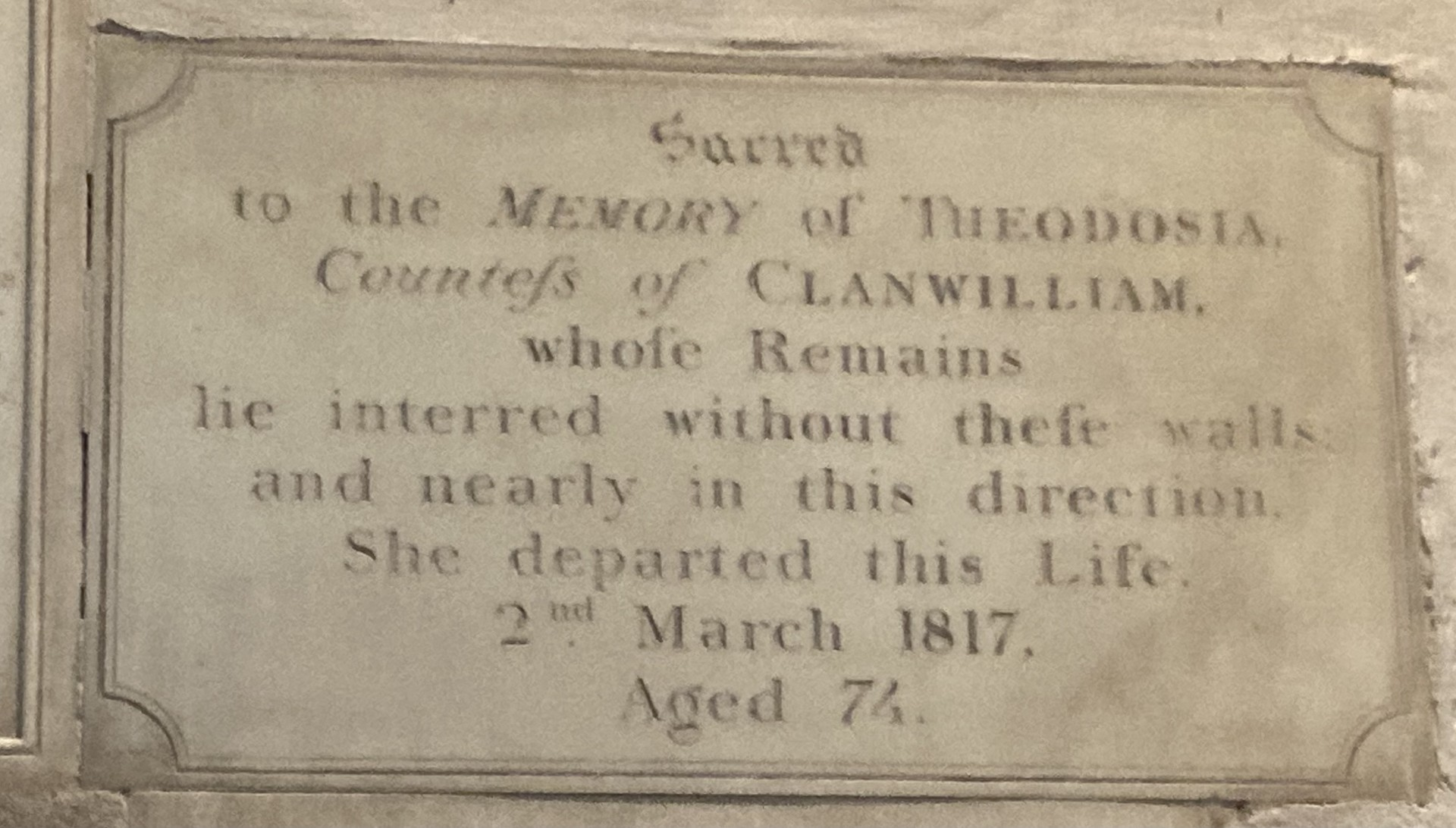
Memorial to Theodosia Meade, Countess of Clanwilliam

Theodosia Meade, Countess of Clanwilliam

== See also ==
- Grade II* listed buildings in Brighton and Hove
- List of churches preserved by the Churches Conservation Trust in Southeast England
- List of places of worship in Brighton and Hove
