= Heneage Wheeler =

English cricketer

Personal information
- Full name: Heneage Gibbes Wheeler
- Born: 24 February 1870; Axbridge, Somerset, England
- Died: 4 August 1965 (aged 95); Preston, Brighton, Sussex, England

Domestic team information
- Years: Team
- 1904: Somerset

Career statistics
Competition	FC
Matches	1
Runs scored	8
Batting average	4.00
100s/50s	0/0
Top score	5
Catches/stumpings	0/–
- Source: CricketArchive, 22 December 2015

Heneage Gibbes Wheeler (1870-1965) was a cricketer who played one first-class match for Somerset in 1904.

A son of Rev. William Hancock Wheeler, vicar of Berrow, Somerset, by his wife Margaretta Alice, daughter of Rev. Heneage Gibbes, M.D. and granddaughter of Sir George Smith Gibbes, of Bath, M.D., a royal physician, Wheeler was born at Axbridge, Somerset on 24 February 1870 and died at Preston Village, Brighton, Sussex on 4 August 1965. His batting style is unknown and it is not known if he was a bowler. In his single game, a 12-a-side match against Oxford University that was subsequently determined to be of first-class status, he batted at No 11 in each innings and he did not bowl. He made innings of 3 and 5 and was out in both. He did not play first-class cricket again.

In 1921, under the Air Ministry and Royal Aeronautical Society notices in Flight magazine (as well as in 'The Aeroplane' magazine and in 'Flight: The Aircraft Engineer and Airships' magazine) there was noted the engagement of "Major Heneage Gibbes Wheeler, late R.A.F, of Bexhill-on-Sea" to a "Florence Hayes of St Louis, U.S.A" . Their son, Heneage Gibbes Wheeler, was born 5 August 1926.
