= Harry R. Heneage =

American football player and administrator (1884–1950)

Harry Heneage
Biographical details
- Born: July 26, 1884; Buffalo, New York, U.S.
- Died: September 2, 1950 (aged 66); Hanover, New Hampshire, U.S.

Administrative career (AD unless noted)
- 1927–1936: Dartmouth

Harry Robert "Rip" Heneage (July 26, 1884 – September 2, 1950) was an American football player and college athletics administrator. He began his association with Dartmouth College as a student in 1903 and played halfback for the 1906 Dartmouth football team. He later served as Dartmouth's athletic director from 1927 to 1936. He resigned in 1936 after suffering a heart attack and died in 1950 at age 66.
