= Heneage Wileman =

English footballer

Personal information
- Full name: Heneage Wileman
- Date of birth: 1888
- Place of birth: Newhall, England
- Date of death: 1926 (aged 37–38)
- Position: Right half

Senior career*
| Years | Team | Apps | (Gls) |
| –1908 | Newhall Swifts | | |
| 1908–1909 | Burton United | | |
| 1909–1911 | Chelsea | 0 | (0) |
| 1911–1922 | Southend United | 58 | (2) |
- * Club domestic league appearances and goals

Heneage Wileman (1888–1926), sometimes known as Harry Wileman, was an English professional footballer, best remembered for his 11-year spell as a right half with Southend United either side of the First World War.

== Personal life ==
Wileman's brother Arthur was also a footballer and they played together at Newhall Swifts, Burton United, Chelsea and Southend United.
