= Preston Manor, Brighton =

Preston Manor
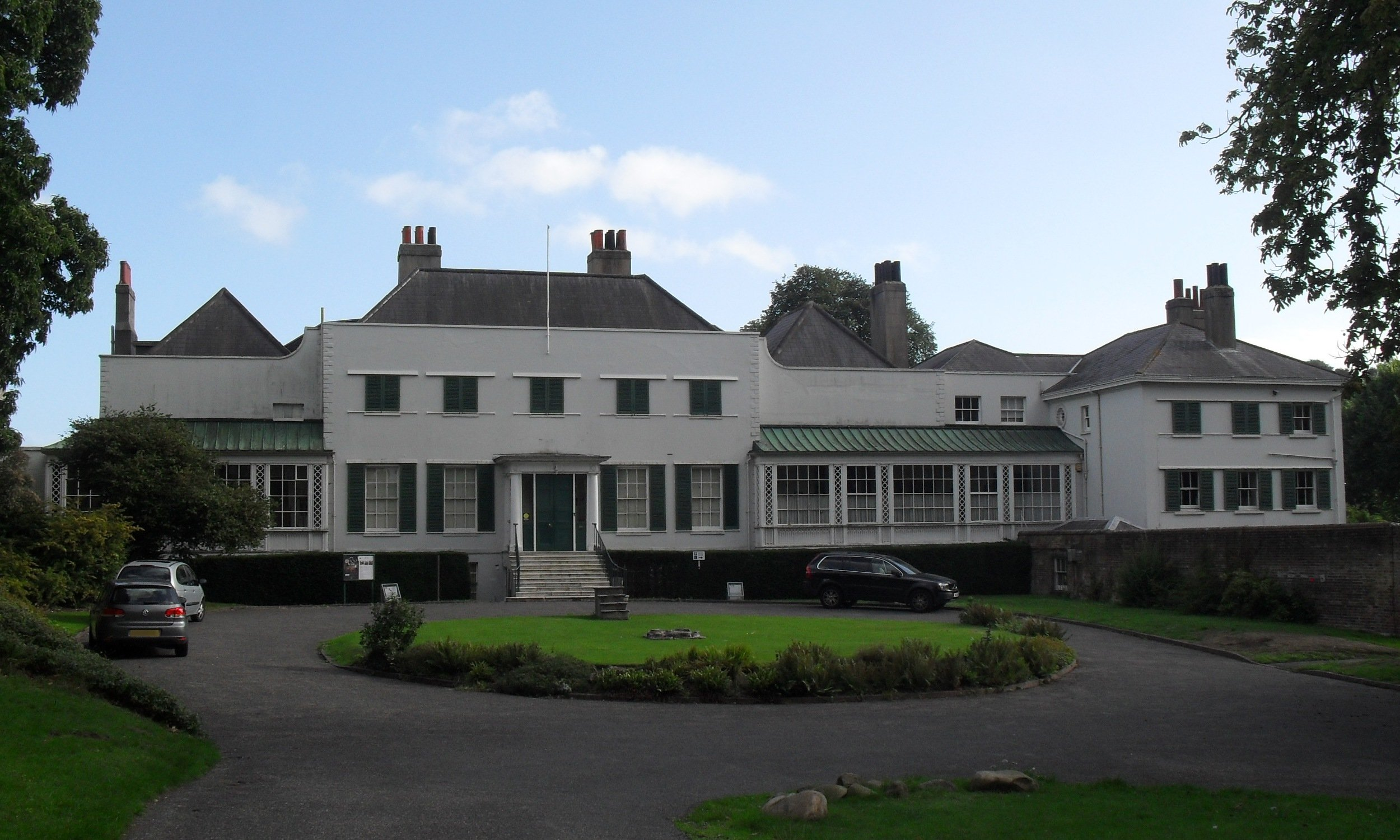
- Main (north) façade of Preston Manor, looking south

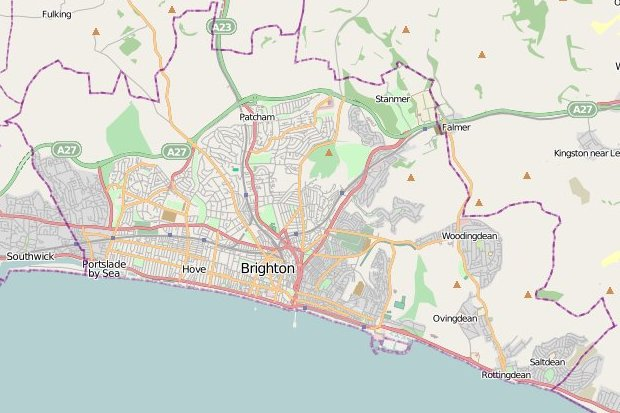
- Location within Brighton and Hove
- 50.8425°N 0.1501°W
- Location: Preston Drove, Preston Village, Brighton and Hove BN1 6SD, United Kingdom

History
- Founded: 13th century
- Built: 1250
- Built for: Lord of the manor of Preston
- Rebuilt: 1738

Site notes
- Architect: Thomas Western
- Architectural style: Palladian/Georgian
- Restored: 1905
- Restored by: Charles Stanley Peach
- Governing body: Brighton & Hove City Council
- Visitors: 8,000 (in 2012)

Listed Building – Grade II*
- Official name: Preston Manor and Attached Railings
- Designated: 13 October 1952
- Reference no.: 1380750

National Register of Historic Parks and Gardens
- Official name: Preston Manor and Preston Park
- Type: Grade II
- Designated: 25 March 1987
- Reference no.: 1000204

Preston Manor is the former manor house of the ancient Sussex village of Preston, now part of the coastal city of Brighton and Hove, England. The present building dates mostly from 1738, when Lord of the manor Thomas Western rebuilt the original 13th-century structure (part of which remains inside), and 1905 when Charles Stanley Peach's renovation and enlargement gave the house its current appearance. The manor house passed through several owners, including the Stanfords—reputedly the richest family in Sussex—after several centuries of ownership by the Diocese of Chichester and a period in which it was Crown property.

Since 1932, when the Stanford family bequeathed the building to Brighton Corporation, Preston Manor has been a museum and exhibition venue evoking upper-class and below stairs life during the Edwardian era. A walled garden, designated as being of historic interest, has old flint walls, a ruined wellhouse and a pet graveyard, among other features. The manor house is reputed to be one of the most haunted buildings in Britain: it has been the subject of ghost tours and television programmes notably Most Haunted, and a wide range of ghostly sightings have been alleged over a long time period. English Heritage has listed the house at Grade II* for its architectural and historical importance; some other structures in the garden are listed at the lower Grade II.

Preston Manor re-opened to the public in April 2025.

== History ==
Preston village originated in the Saxon era—probably during the 9th or 10th century—as evidenced by its name (derived from Preste-tun, meaning "priest's farmstead"). The old spelling was still in use in the 11th century; by the 16th century, the term "Bishops Preston" or "Preston Episcopi" was in common use to avoid confusion with other Prestons elsewhere. Roman occupation of the area was confirmed in 1877. In its original form, the ecclesiastical parish covered a 1-by-2-mile (1.6 km × 3.2 km) area north of Hove and Brighton.

By 1086, when the Domesday survey was carried out, Preston's importance had grown, and it had the status of a manor. A manor house—likely to have been a simple timber-framed structure—would have existed at this time, but no trace survives. The manor was held by the Episcopal See at Selsey, then by the Bishop of Chichester after the See transferred there in 1075. The Domesday survey calculated the manor's value to be £25, and recorded 12 ploughs (a team of eight oxen), a church, the manor house and a mill of unspecified type. A parish population of about 50 is suggested by the existence of 12 ploughs. The present St Peter's Church, built in the mid-13th century, stands on the site of two earlier churches.

Although the manor belonged to the Bishopric of Chichester, it would have been administered on their behalf by a steward or bailiff. By 1510 the bishops had given up on farming and began renting out their lands. The first tenant at Preston was Edward Elrington and his wife Beatrix Shirley. Edward died in 1515 (his tomb is in St Peter's Church) and his family, including his son Richard, stayed at Preston to farm sheep.

The present manor house has its origins in a simple mid-13th century stone-built building with two rooms of unequal size. Remnants of this house, which has been dated to 1250, survive in the basement. It faced north and measured 50 by 25 feet (15.2 m × 7.6 m). The stone walls were 2 feet (0.61 m) thick. The main hall was on the right-hand (western) side; it measured 27 by 21 feet (8.2 m × 6.4 m) and was raised slightly above the steeply sloping ground to provide space for a cellar underneath. The second room, on the left-hand (eastern) side, measured 18 by 21 feet (5.5 m × 6.4 m). Both rooms had a centrally oriented chimney-stack on the south (rear) side, rising from fireplaces in the rooms to the roof. Only the general layout of these rooms can now be made out; parts of two original arched doorways between the two medieval rooms, and a chamfered arched opening, are the only other 13th-century features.

After the Dissolution of the Monasteries, the Crown took possession of the manor and the Elrington family became tenants of the Crown. The transfer was completed in 1561, at which time the property was valued at £38.12s.4d. When he died with no sons in 1569, Richard Elrington left his property to his widow, who in turn left it to her son by her previous marriage to William Shirley, named Anthony. He married several years later and eventually had twelve children. Anthony's wife pre-deceased him by one year, and when he died in 1624 the manor passed to their son Thomas. In 1628 he bought the reversion of the lease of the manor from the Crown and became the first Lord of the Manor.

It was either Anthony or his son Thomas who undertook the first significant structural changes to the manor house during the 1600s. Elaborate (but "clumsily executed") moulded entrance doors were added in the east and west walls; designed in the Classical style, with flanking pilasters, architraves and cornices with a frieze. These survive, although not in their original condition. An extension may have been built during the time the manor was in the Shirley family: the lower part of the staircase (most of which dates from 1738) terminates at a first-floor landing and may date from about 1685. East of the staircase, there is a late 17th-century marble chimney-breast. The walled garden was also established at this time.

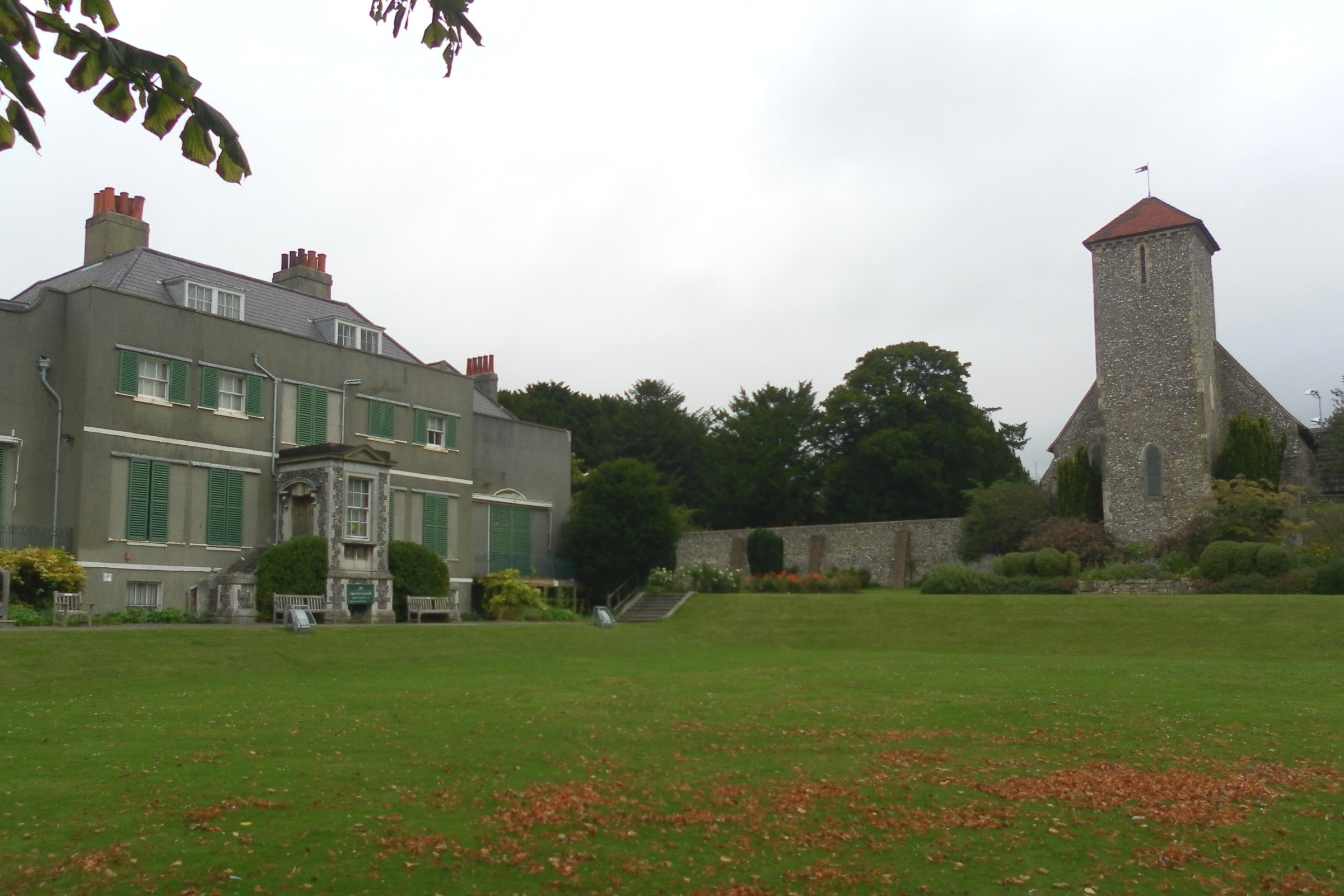
St Peter's Church and Preston Manor have stood together since the 13th century.

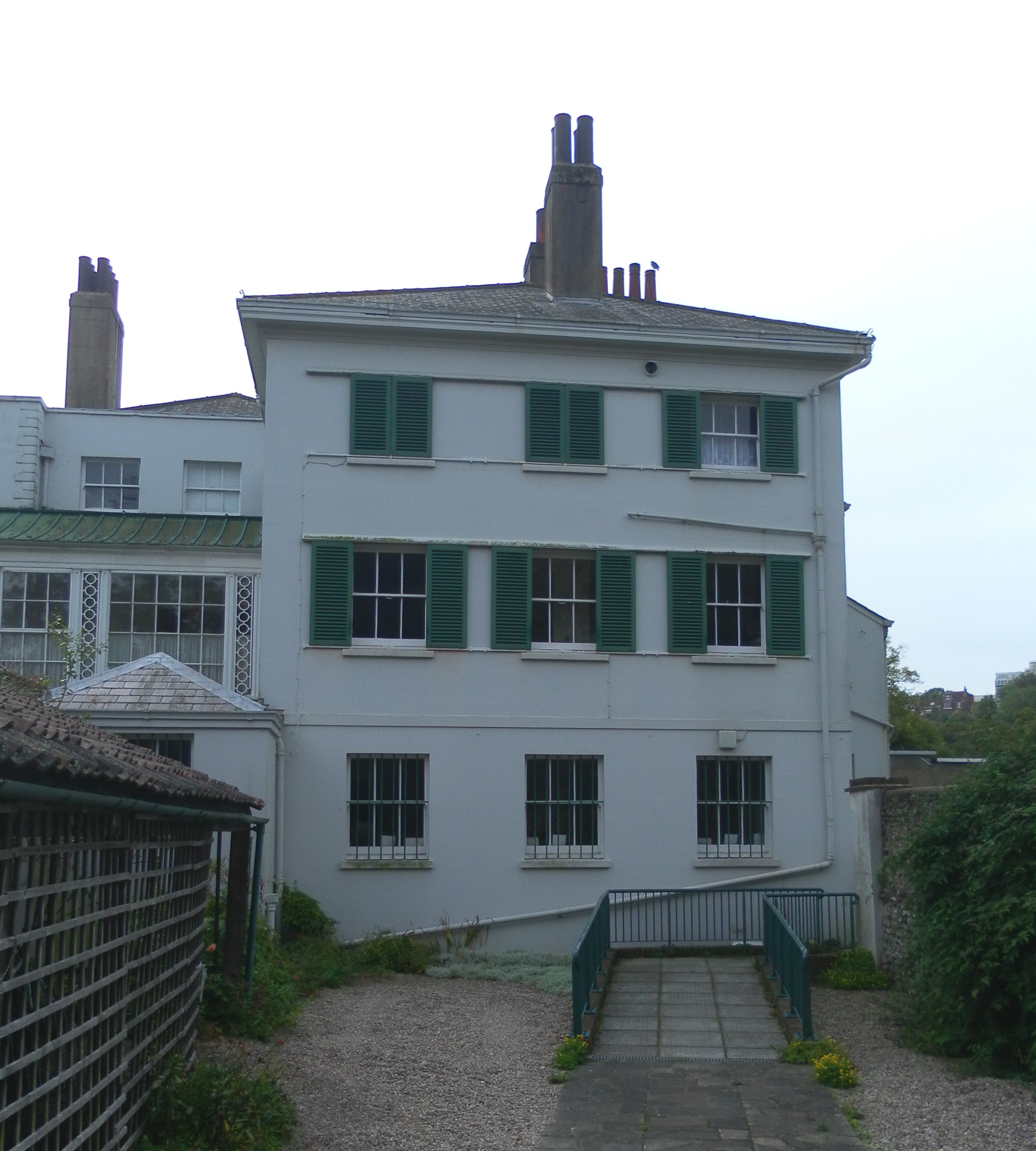
The west wing was added in 1905.

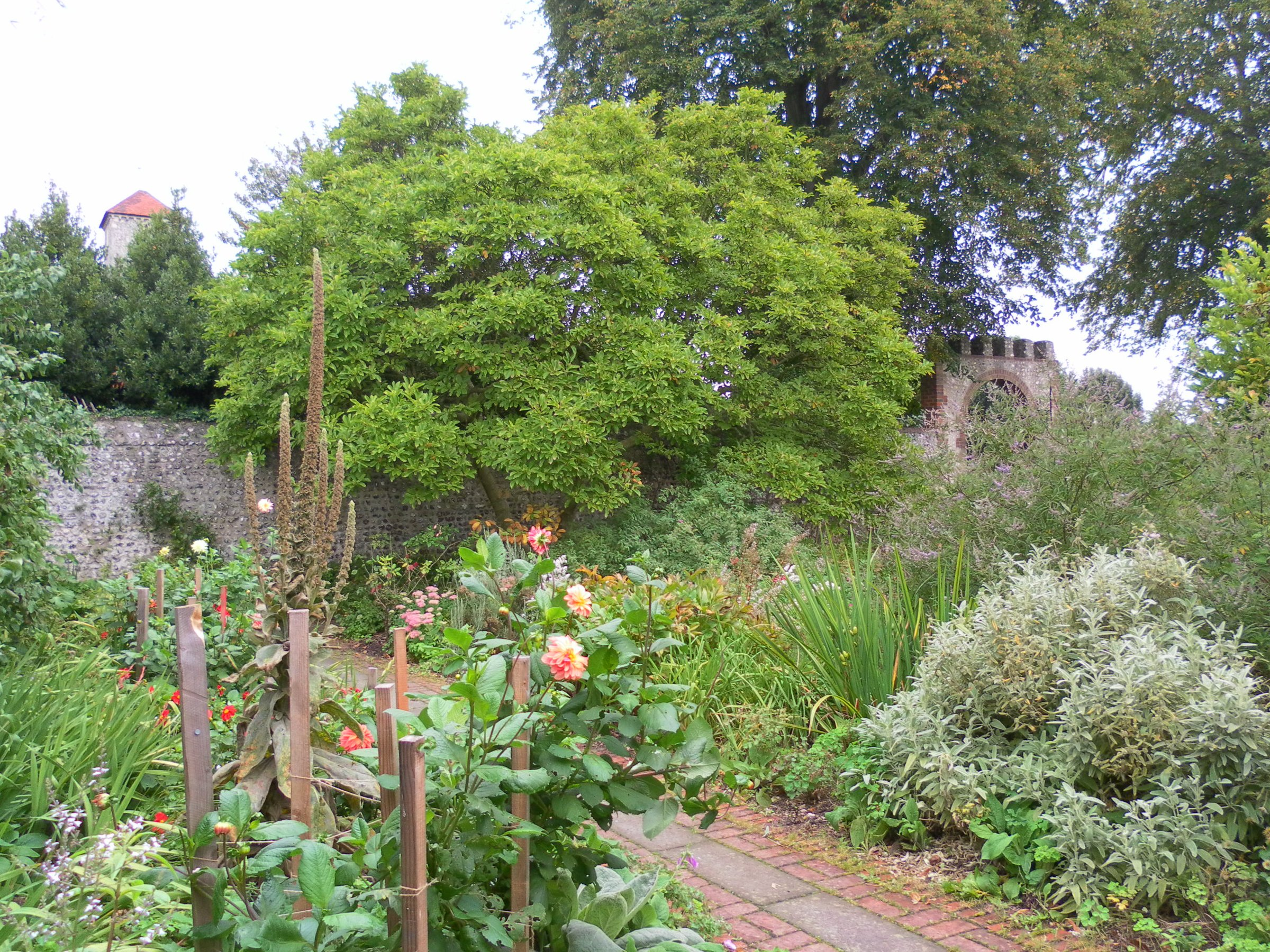
Extensive gardens have been retained and restored to their Edwardian appearance.

Thomas also named his eldest son Thomas, and in 1654 this Thomas's son, named Anthony inherited the estate. Sir Anthony Shirley, 1st Baronet Shirley of Preston, was involved in public life as a Member of Parliament for Arundel (1654), Sussex (1656) and Steyning (1660). In April 1658 an enquiry was held at Preston Manor by Oliver Cromwell's Council of State concerning a Royalist plot in Sussex. After serving the Commonwealth, Anthony somehow gained the favour of King Charles II and became a baronet in 1666. He was succeeded by his son Sir Richard, 2nd Baronet Shirley of Preston, in 1683, and when Richard died the property passed to his son, also named Richard, 3rd Baronet Shirley of Preston. Richard Shirley died unmarried in 1705 and Preston Manor was inherited jointly by his three sisters named Anne, Mary and Judith. Anne married Robert Western in 1698 and Mary married Robert's nephew Thomas Western in 1712. Judith died unmarried in 1711 and her share was split between the two surviving sisters. Thomas Western then purchased Anne's portion for £6,275 the following year. By the early 18th century, therefore, the Western family were in possession of the manor.

Thomas Western had estates in Essex and came from a mercantile family. When he died in 1733 he was succeeded by his son, also called Thomas. Under this Thomas Western's oversight, Preston Manor was rebuilt around the core of the 13th-century building and was given a new interior. He may have designed the additions and alterations himself: a foundation stone in the basement is carved with the date 1738 and the name "Thos. Western". He gave the building a symmetrical five-bay Palladian/Georgian-style façade across its full 50-foot (15 m) width. This had five entrances (of which the centre one formed a porch leading to an entrance hall), but the unequal width of the two medieval rooms inside meant the interior layout would not match the symmetry of the exterior. The lopsided appearance (unusual for this era and the chosen architectural style) was perpetuated when Western added unequally sized western and eastern wings, in the style of pavilions, containing a dining room and library respectively.

When Thomas died, the succession then passed jointly to two of his sons, Charles Western and Reverend Thomas Walsingham Western. Thomas exchanged his estates for lands in Essex, while in 1766 Charles married Frances, daughter of a colonial agent in the American colonies. Their married life was short as during a phaeton ride, the horse stumbled and her husband was killed. Their eldest son, also named Charles, was saved when Frances threw him from the phaeton into the safety of a bush. Soon after her husband's death, Frances took their children to Essex and never returned to Preston Manor. In 1794, Preston Manor which included about 1,000 acres of land was sold to a tenant William Stanford for £17,600 ending the long association of Preston with the Western family.

William Stanford came from an established farming family near Horsham in West Sussex. When he bought Preston Manor it included the house, farm and surrounding lands in Brighton and Hove. He was already a wealthy man. Around this time, the interior was redecorated in the Adam style, and a columned screen was added in the entrance hall. William married Elizabeth Avery, and they had two children, both of whom died in 1790. Their mother died the following year. In 1802, he took another wife, Mary Tourle of Lewes, and had seven children with her. He sold his farm produce in the growing town of Brighton and was awarded a contract by the Town Commissioners to clear night-soil (sewage) from the streets and cesspools. In 1808, he became High Sheriff of Sussex. When he died in 1841, he was considered to be one of the richest private individuals in the county. His eldest son, William Stanford the younger, inherited Preston and continued the life of a rich country farmer. In 1842, he married Eleanor Montague Morris, the daughter of a London solicitor. Their first child, a son, died aged only five months. A daughter, named Ellen, was born in 1848. William died in 1853 and Ellen became the heir to the Stanford Estate.

The following year Eleanor married Captain George Varnham Macdonald, and the couple went on to have three daughters, Flora (born 1857) and later twins Diana and Christiana, known as Lily (born 1866). Ellen was educated at Miss Russell's private school in Montpelier Road, Brighton and after graduating spent two social seasons in London. In October 1867, she married Vere Fane Benett-Stanford (1840–1894) of Pythouse near Tisbury, Wiltshire, in a ceremony at St Peter's Church, after which a wedding breakfast for forty guests was held at Preston Manor. After the marriage, under the terms of William Stanford's will, Vere took the Stanford surname. Vere and Ellen spent their married life at Pythouse or their London townhouse in South Kensington. Vere and Ellen had one child, a son named John Montague Benett-Stanford (born 1870). After an unspectacular academic career, he left Eton at sixteen for an apprenticeship on the railways and then joined the army. In later life, he gained a reputation for erratic and eccentric behaviour, and had a very difficult relationship with his mother.

The Stanford family's influence grew in the nineteenth century as they acquired more land in strategically important places around Brighton and Hove: they were able to control the two towns' expansion by choosing when to sell land and stipulating how it would be developed. The rapid expansion of Brighton in the early nineteenth century made for high income from rents and William Stanford the elder made a steady income from the collection of fees for surrendering his feudal rights over building land on the Adelaide and Brunswick estates. When the railway lines crossed the Stanford estate he received £30,000 compensation for the loss of his land and the spoiling of the westerly view from Preston Manor.

William Stanford the younger's complicated will prevented the selling of freehold building land but a subsequent Act of Parliament, the 1871 Stanford Estate Act, allowed Ellen to grant building agreements with the option to purchase the freehold within seven years at a price equivalent to the ground rent for twenty-five years, clearing the way for the transformation of the Stanford estate from agricultural lands to building sites. To offset the sale of land in Brighton, the Stanford estate trustees acquired freeholds in Wiltshire, Sussex, Middlesex and Croydon and leaseholds in London. In 1891 Vere and Ellen persuaded the trustees of the Stanford Estate to purchase his family's estates at Pythouse and Norton Bavant in Wiltshire. The profit made from this transaction enabled Vere and Ellen to purchase a yacht and a property on the island of Madeira called Quinta Vigia, where they began spending the winter months for the sake of Vere's health. He died there in 1894.

The widowed Ellen Benett-Stanford divided her time between London, Wiltshire, Brighton and Madeira. In 1896 in Madeira she met Charles Thomas, a bachelor who had been fortune seeking in the mines of South Africa and Rhodesia, and they married the following year. Charles took the Stanford name and arms, and the couple went to live at Pythouse. They travelled extensively and took summer holidays to Charles's house in Norway, a base for his fishing trips, and winter visits to a new holiday home in Madeira which they purchased in 1902 and renamed Quinta Stanford. Charles pursued his interests in history and archaeology and published several books. Meanwhile, Ellen's son John was in Africa hunting big game, serving with the Tirah field force and working as a freelance war correspondent. He was one of the earliest newsreel photographers and was wounded while filming during the Boer War. He had married Evelyn Hume in 1893, and they had two children: Vere (born 1894) and Patience (born 1899, d.1904).

Ellen's mother, Eleanor, died in 1903 and by 1905 Ellen and Charles had decided to make Preston Manor their main residence. Charles Stanley Peach, a friend of the Stanfords, was commissioned in 1905 to make substantial alterations to the house and grounds. He built a verandah to the right of the entrance, built an extension containing a new dining room and rooms for visitors and servants to the west, built a porch on the rear (south) elevation, and added lavishly decorated corridors on the northeast and northwest sides. Alterations were made to the basement servants' rooms and new attic rooms were added. The entrance hall was also widened. About five years later, a verandah was added to the left of the entrance to match the original on the right.

The 1905 alterations provided more space for entertaining in style, which became particularly important as Charles became involved in local politics. In 1910 he was elected Mayor of Brighton, a position he held until 1913, and Preston became the setting for a series of high-profile social and civic events. In 1914 Charles was elected as a Conservative Member of Parliament, a position he held until 1922. During the First World War Ellen and Charles were involved in the organising of gifts for Indian soldiers being treated in military hospitals in Brighton, and Ellen was busy writing letters of condolence to all Sussex families who had lost someone serving in the conflict. Her much-loved grandson Vere was serving in field artillery units on the Western Front, where his promotion was rapid. Despite several hospitalisations he remained in the army after the war but was finally diagnosed with tuberculosis in 1920 and sent to a sanitorium in Switzerland. In January 1922 he returned to England, where he died at Pythouse a few months later.

As early as 1918 Ellen was thinking of selling Preston Manor to Brighton Corporation; years of feuding with her son had left a legacy of bitterness. Charles and Ellen were probably influenced by their friend Henry Roberts, Director of the Royal Pavilion, but they also feared that if John did inherit he would demolish the house or turn it into a girls' school. In 1925 Charles bought Preston Manor from his wife's trustees and made provision in his will that, subject to the respective life interests of himself and Ellen, Preston Manor and four acres of adjoining land should pass to Brighton Corporation by deed of gift on the condition that it be preserved in its historic condition and be used as a museum with exhibits relevant to Brighton and Sussex. The frontage to Preston Road and Preston Drove was purchased by the corporation for the sum of £5,000 (although the sale was not completed until after Charles and Ellen died). Also in 1925 Charles and Ellen were given the honorary freedom of Brighton and in 1929 Charles was made a baronet in recognition of his years of public service. Sir Charles and Lady Ellen Thomas-Stanford continued to live at Preston Manor until their deaths in 1932. Charles died in March having willed to the Corporation 'all my books, documents, ancient deeds and papers relating exclusively or primarily to the County of Sussex'. (The rest of his library went to the National Library of Wales). Ellen died in November, bequeathing to the corporation the furniture and contents of the house.

The transfer to the corporation (a forerunner of the present Brighton & Hove City Council) was completed in January 1933, after which the building was opened to the public as a museum of Edwardian life, showing how a wealthy rural family would have lived and entertained at that time. As stipulated by Ellen Thomas-Stanford, Henry Roberts became Curator of Preston Manor and he and his family took up residence in the west wing. In 1936 the Preston Road frontage was set back and the main road widened. At this time the lodge, stables and gardener's cottage were demolished and the grounds to the north and west were laid out with grass and shrubs. In 1939 the Macquoid Bequest was installed in what had been Sir Charles's library and is now known as the Macquoid Room. During the Second World War Preston Manor became an Air Raid Precaution report centre, control centre and a base for a mobile First Aid post. In November 1945 HRH Princess Elizabeth came to tea at Preston Manor at the invitation of the Mayor of Brighton. It was her first public occasion. On 20 July 1947 a funeral tea was held in the drawing room for Christiana (Lily) Macdonald, with the Manor closed to the public that afternoon in respect. In 1951 Henry Roberts died and his daughter Margery became honorary curator of Preston Manor, a position she held until 1970. The Victorian servants' quarters in the semi-basement were restored and opened to the public in 1988. The walled garden was restored in the 1990s with money from the Heritage Lottery Fund. The way Preston Manor is presented to the public today reflects the way of life of a rich gentry family and their servants in the period before and after the First World War.

== Architecture ==
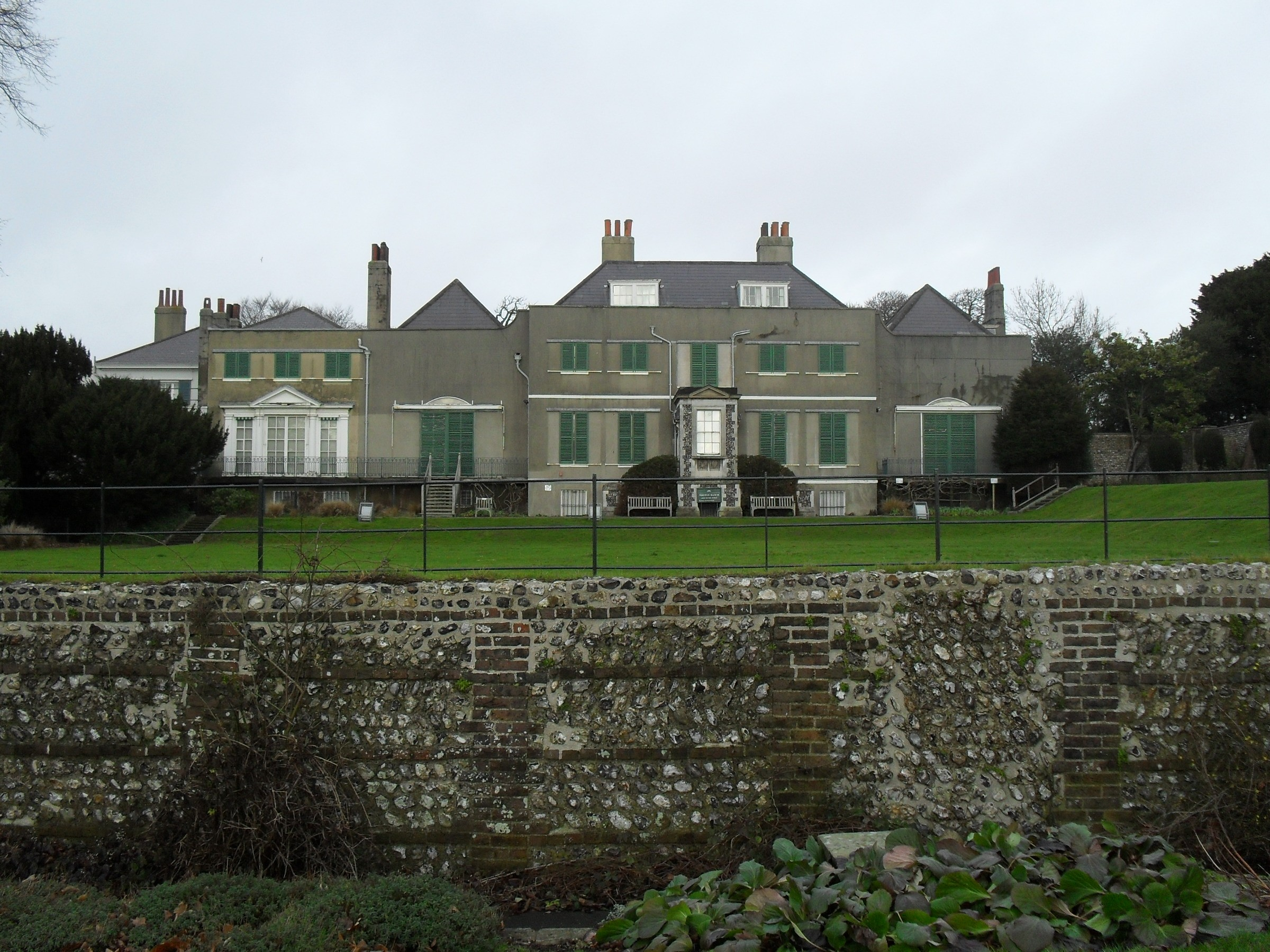
The rear elevation of Preston Manor stands in front of a garden which is bounded by a Grade II-listed wall (in foreground).

Preston Manor is a two-storey building with a symmetrical Palladian/Georgian façade, now clad in stucco, and a roof laid with Welsh slates. The design is characteristic of the mid-18th century, when such symmetrical compositions were fashionable. More space is provided by the basement (in which the remains of the medieval manor house are visible) and the attic, which has dormer windows. The entrance is on the north side and has a five-window range on the main façade. Its east and west wings, added in the 1738 rebuilding, have windows at ground-floor level only (except for a single first-floor window on the east side), and Charles Stanley Peach's additions of 1905 have two- and three-window ranges. All windows retain their original sashes and louvre-style shutters. The hipped roof, with a centrally placed chimney, sits behind a parapet; the side wings have similar roofs. A parapet continues around the roof of the south façade, which has several chimneys at the sides.

The north-side main entrance, in the centre of the ground floor and reached by steps with iron railings, is flanked by a Classical-style porch with Doric columns topped by paterae (round decorative elements) and a cornice. The sides of the porch have rectangular windows, and the door is panelled. Although remodelled during Peach's work in 1905, the porch dates from about 1800. Flanking the porch are a pair of extensively glazed early 20th-century cast-iron verandahs with copper roofs.

The south (rear, garden-facing) front has a centrally oriented flint and stone porch flanked by paired entrances with segmental arched pediments and keystones, windows with architraves and a panel with a coat-of-arms carving. The five-window range on the main façade is similar to that on the north side, but the side wings have arched French windows and balconies.

The visitor route covers four levels and includes the entrance hall, a former library (now the Macquoid Room), a morning room, ground-floor corridors on the northeast and northwest sides, the Cleves Room, a drawing room and dining room and a substantial staircase leading to a first-floor landing with former bedrooms on the northwest, north, northeast, southwest and southeast sides, as well as two servants bedrooms and an Edwardian bathroom. At attic level there is a former maids workroom now presented as a nursery, a lavatory and bathroom and housekeeping storage rooms, and restored Victorian servants quarters can be visited in the basement.

== Gardens and other structures ==
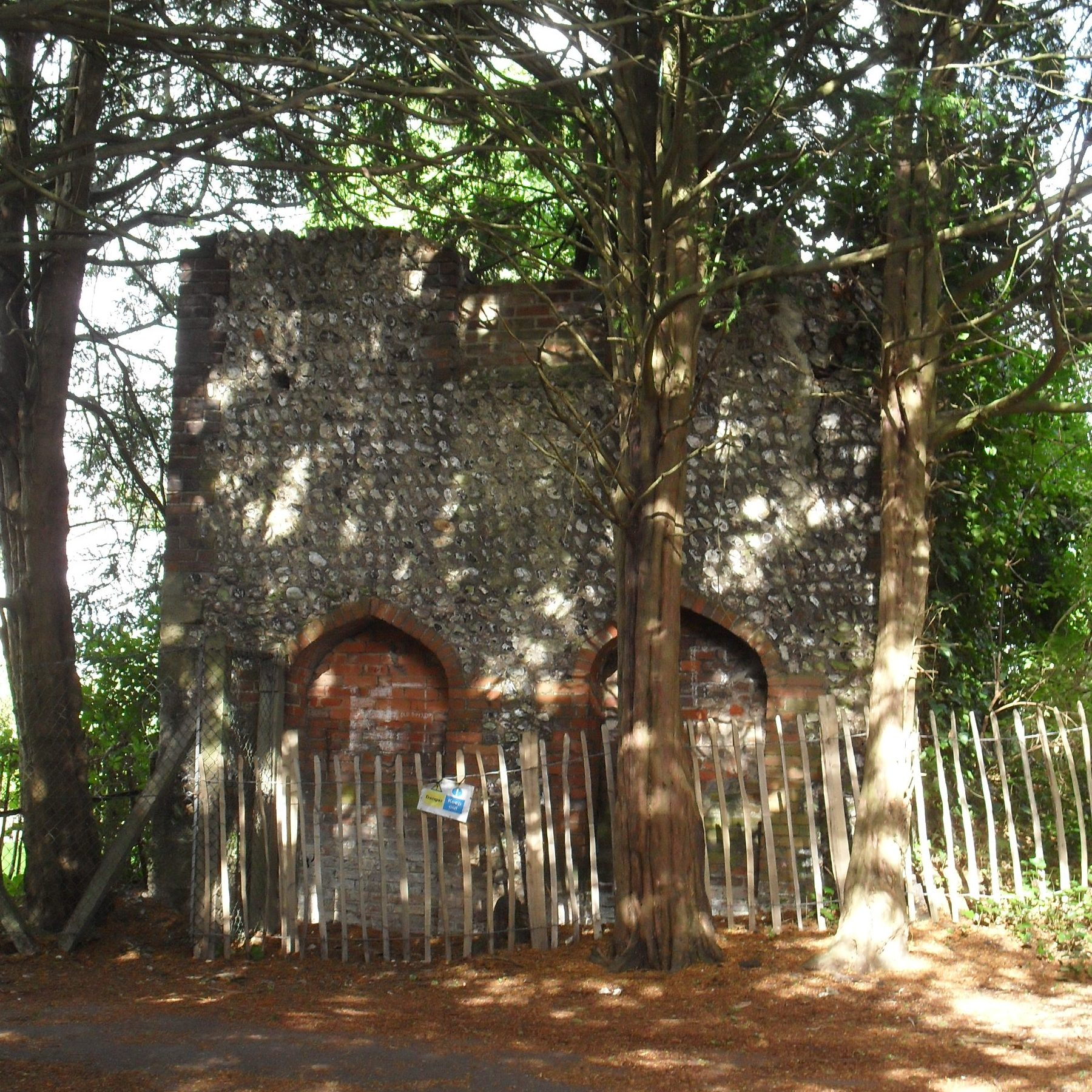
This ruined wellhouse (west face pictured) dates from the 1730s.

The 18th-century walled garden (whose flint walls survive from that era) is between the manor house and St Peter's Church. A hedge-flanked wooden bridge leads to it. The layout follows the sloping contours of the land, and consists of four linked gardens: the walled section, a formal lawn at a lower level, a sensory garden for blind people and an area with lily ponds. An unusual feature is a pet cemetery, believed to be the only one in Sussex. Four cats and 16 dogs are buried in the plot in the southwest corner of the garden. English Heritage has designated the manor's grounds in their entirety as a Garden of Historic Interest.

The 18th-century flint walls, which are a Grade II-listed structure, are about 280 feet (85 m) long and surround the garden on three sides. The west wall is a 20th-century reconstruction. When the manor house was rebuilt by Thomas Western in 1738, a 16th-century arched doorway was removed from the building and inserted in the south-facing wall.

A wellhouse east of the manor house, also a Grade II-listed building, dates from the 1730s. It is now in poor condition, and has lost its original iron pump (operated by a horse) and capstan. The rectangular structure is principally of flint with some red brickwork on the quoins and elsewhere. The east, west and north faces have respectively one, two and three brick-dressed arches (now blocked); the south side cannot be seen. A brick wall surrounds the structure.

== Haunted reputation ==
Preston Manor has a long-established reputation as a site of paranormal activity, and it has been described as one of Britain's most haunted houses. Ghosts allegedly seen since the 19th century include a grey-clad woman, a blonde woman who revealed herself to be an excommunicated nun, a floating hand and a phantom riding a toy tractor.

The blonde nun (often called "The White Lady") is the earliest and most famous purported ghost. First mentioned in the 16th century, the frequency of its reported appearances peaked at the end of the 19th century, and it was last recorded in 1903. One of Eleanor Stanford's children from her second marriage, already familiar with the descriptions of the ghost, claimed to have encountered it in 1896, walking from the drawing room to the staircase, and said that the apparition disappeared when she tried to touch it. Soon afterwards, another daughter apparently saw the same figure at the top of the stairs. Later in 1896, a friend of the Stanford family, who was staying at Preston Manor in the hope of seeing the White Lady, reported encountering it in the entrance hall. The man found out (supposedly through talking to the ghost) that it was the spirit of a nun who had been excommunicated and buried on unconsecrated land. More details—including that there were two ghosts, both of whom were nuns who had been excommunicated in about 1535 by a friar, even though one had done no wrong—were suggested at a séance held in late 1896. Early in 1897, the skeleton of a middle-aged woman, whose remains were dated to the 16th century by a doctor, was found behind the house during building work; it was secretly buried on consecrated ground in St Peter's churchyard, with help from the Stanford family. A séance held in 1898 reputedly made contact with the now pacified spirits, and only two more sightings were recorded of a spirit with the characteristic long fair hair: both in 1903, once in a billiard room and once in a bedroom. White-clad female spirits were later reported by passers-by in 1976 and 1992 in the grounds of the manor.

The same daughter who allegedly saw the ghost on the staircase also reported seeing two phantom men apparently fighting on another staircase on the southwest side earlier in the 19th century. Early in the 20th century, she also reported an "immensely evil" presence in the southwest bedroom, moving around the room and then leaning over the bed. In the same room, a visitor to the house once thought she saw a floating hand, not attached to any arm, attaching itself to her four-poster bed and moving up and down it. Another visitor later reported an identical experience, and also said that the bed seemed to be shaking during the encounter. The southwest side of the building was apparently a focus for paranormal activity: strange noises, objects being moved, dresses being cut with regular patterns of holes, and doors opening and shutting were all reported there.

A grey-clad female ghost was reported several times throughout the 20th century. Reputed sightings included one in the boiler room of the house, early in the 20th century; two in quick succession by a World War II firewatcher, first on the main staircase then on the parapet of the roof; and one by a security guard. Another security guard reported a ghost in old-fashioned black clothing walking across a landing in the 1990s. In the 1960s, a ghost apparently riding a toy tractor was reported in the grounds.

Preston Manor's extensive history of purported paranormal activity has led to the establishment of regular "ghost tours", and the Living television channel's programme Most Haunted filmed an episode there in June 2006.

== The building today ==
Preston Manor was listed at Grade II* on 13 October 1952. Such buildings are defined as being "particularly important ... [and] of more than special interest". As of February 2001, it was one of 70 Grade II*-listed buildings and structures, and 1,218 listed buildings of all grades, in the city of Brighton and Hove. The garden walls on the southeast side of the house, and the ruined wellhouse in the grounds, were listed at the lower Grade II (a designation given to "nationally important buildings of special interest") on 20 August 1971. As of February 2001, they were two of 1,124 Grade II-listed buildings in the city.

Preston Manor is part of the 80.51-acre (32.58 ha) Preston Village Conservation Area, one of 34 conservation areas in the city of Brighton and Hove. This area was first designated on 24 September 1970 and has since been expanded. The manor house and the adjacent St Peter's Church are considered to be the core buildings of the conservation area.

The manor house is owned by Brighton & Hove City Council and administered as part of the Royal Pavilion and Museums Trust, which also controls the Royal Pavilion, Brighton Museum & Art Gallery, Hove Museum of Creativity and the Booth Museum of Natural History. It is run as a museum displaying and commemorating the Edwardian era and the Stanford family (its name was originally the Thomas-Stanford Museum when it opened in 1933), demonstrating the everyday life of its residents and servants.

The museum reopened in April 2025.

== See also ==
- Grade II* listed buildings in Brighton and Hove
