= Preston, Brighton =

Suburb of Brighton and Hove, England

Coordinates: 50°50′43″N 0°08′57″W

Preston
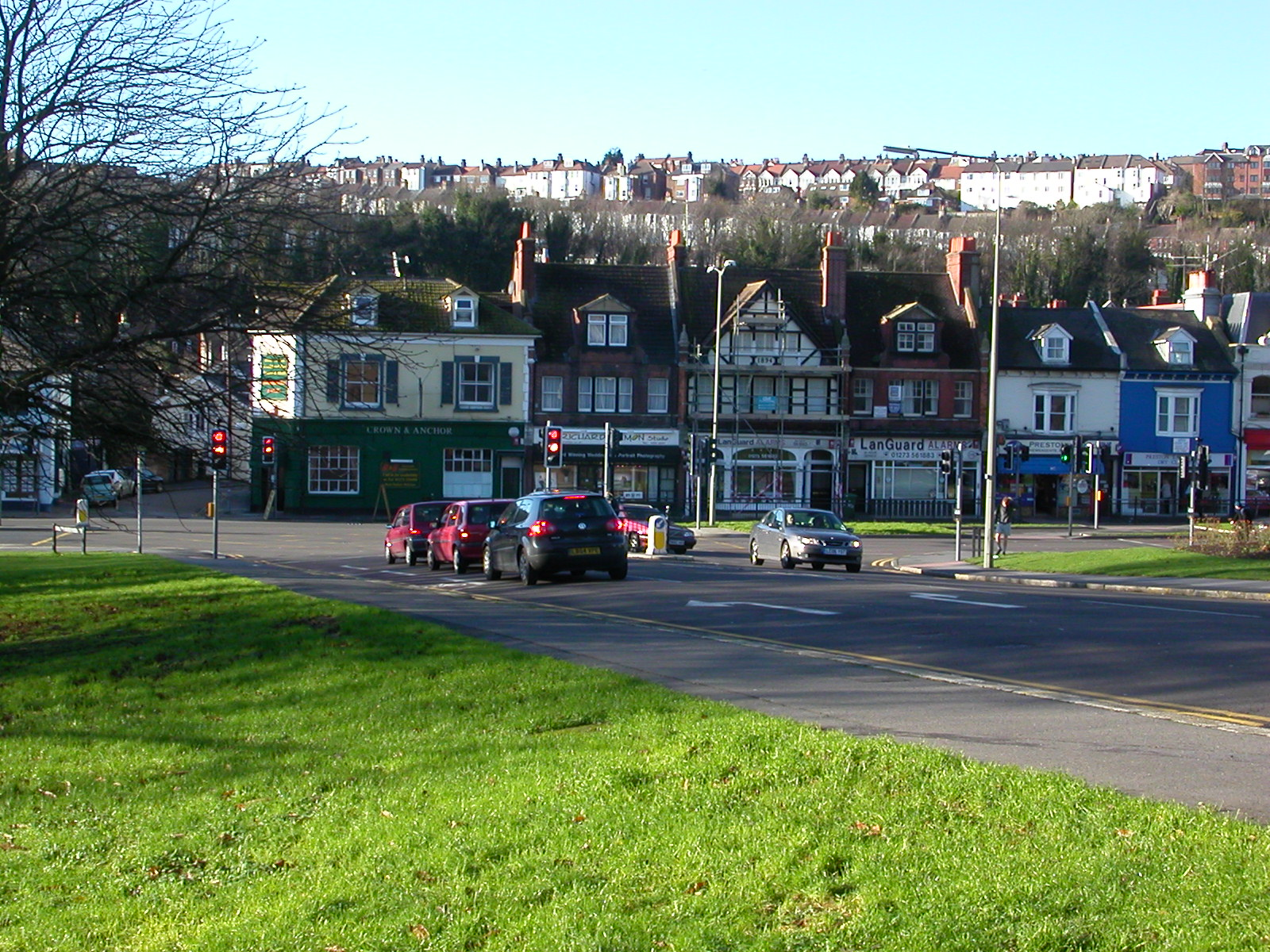

- Location within East Sussex
- Unitary authority: Brighton and Hove
- Ceremonial county: East Sussex
- Region: South East
- Country: England
- Sovereign state: United Kingdom
- Post town: BRIGHTON
- Postcode district: BN1
- Dialling code: 01273
- Police: Sussex
- Fire: East Sussex
- Ambulance: South East Coast
- UK Parliament: Brighton, Pavilion

Preston or Preston Village is a suburb of Brighton and Hove, in the ceremonial county of East Sussex, England. It is to the north of the centre. Originally a village in its own right, it was eventually absorbed into Brighton with the development of the farmland owned by the local Stanford family, officially becoming a parish of the town in 1928. Stanford-owned land to the south of Preston Manor was given to the town and now makes up Preston Park, one of the largest parks in the now conjoined city of Brighton and Hove. The park hosts some of the city's major public events such as Brighton Pride.

Preston, the suburb of Melbourne, Victoria, Australia was named after the village in 1856.

== History ==
The name "Preston" means 'Priests' farm/settlement'. Preston was recorded in the Domesday Book as Prestetone. Preston is a former civil parish; In 1921, it had a population of 31,161. On 1 April 1928 the parish was abolished and merged with Brighton.

== See also ==
- Preston Park railway station
- St John the Evangelist's Church, Preston Village, the current Anglican parish church
- St Mary's Church, Preston Park, the Roman Catholic parish church
- St Peter's Church, Preston Village, the former Anglican parish church

== Gallery ==
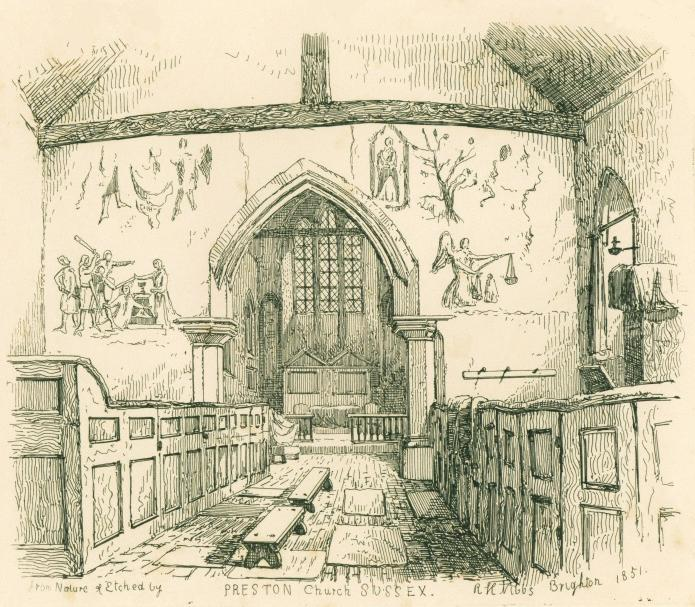
Interior of the Preston parish church, etching by R. H. Nibbs dated 1851 showing wall paintings

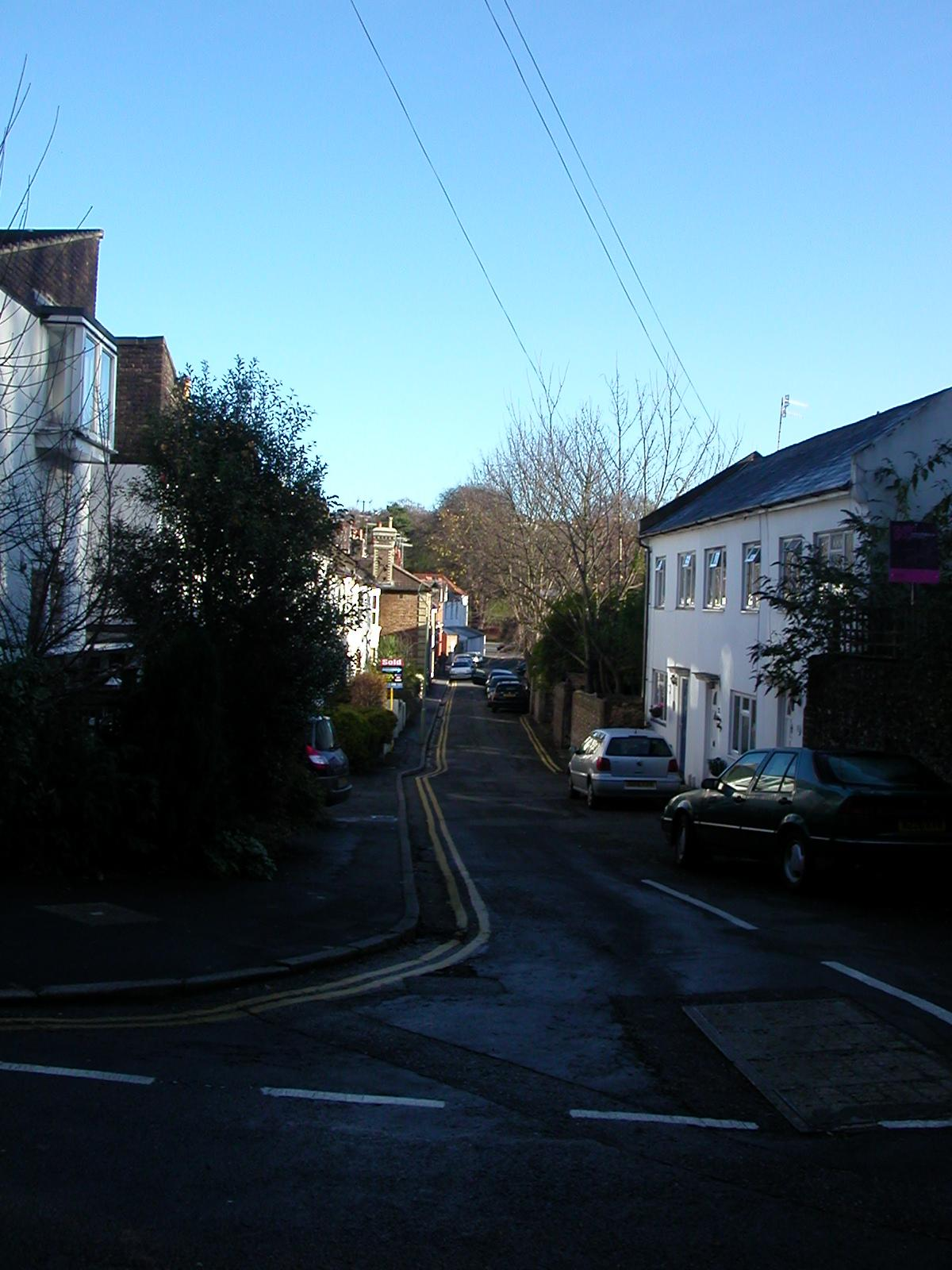
Middle Road was one of the original lanes in the village. It now sits between the Brighton Main Line to the west and the A23 London Road to the east.

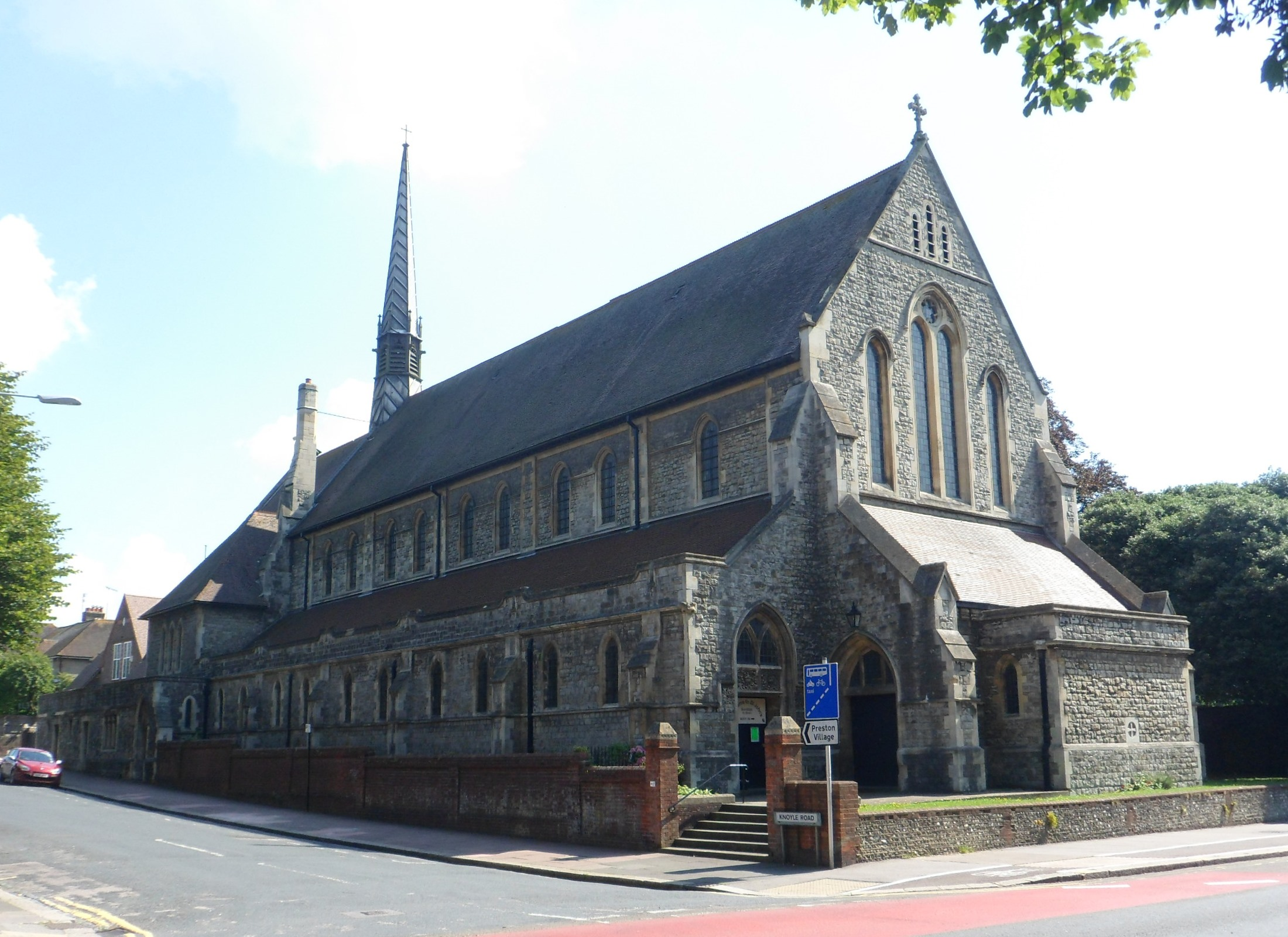
St John the Evangelist's Church is the parish church of Preston. A bowling green lies to the south.

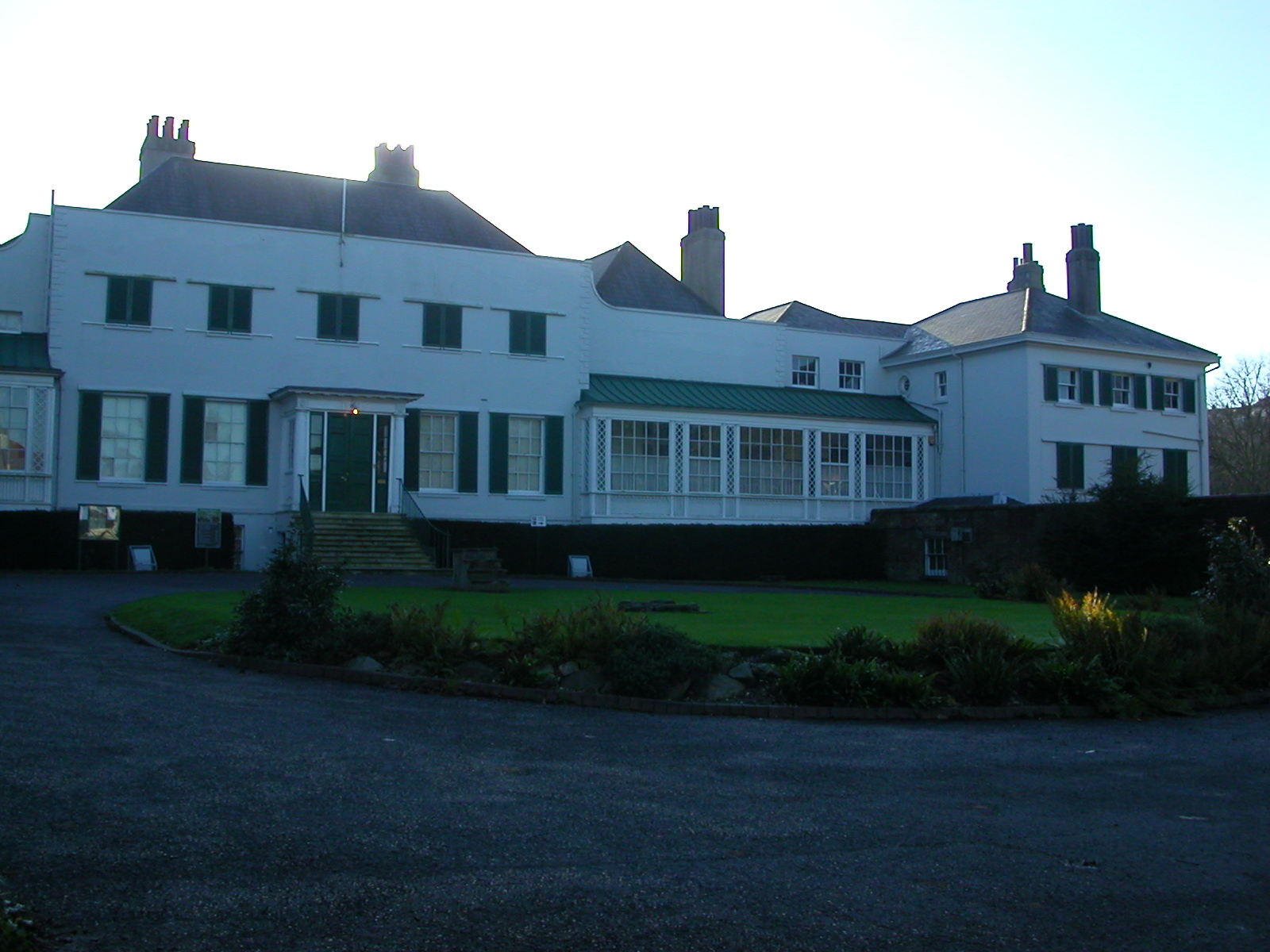
Preston Manor, built in its present form in 1738 and bequeathed to the council by the Stanford family in 1933. It is now a museum.

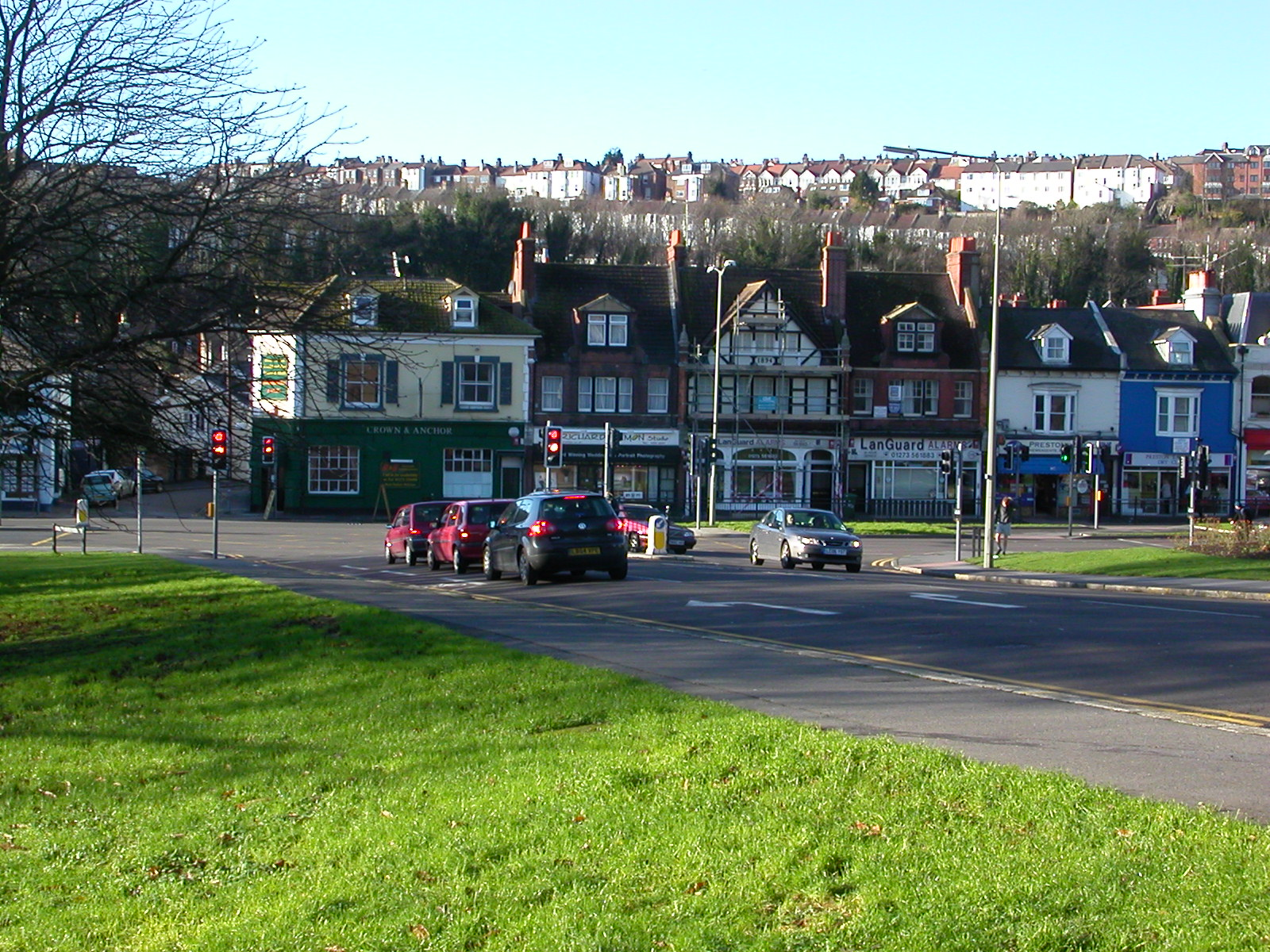
The major crossroads in the village, with the A23 London Road running north to south, Preston Drove (forming the northern boundary of Preston Park) to the east and North Road to the west. This view looks westwards from outside Preston Manor.
