= Hangleton Manor Inn =

Historic manor house in Hove, Sussex, England

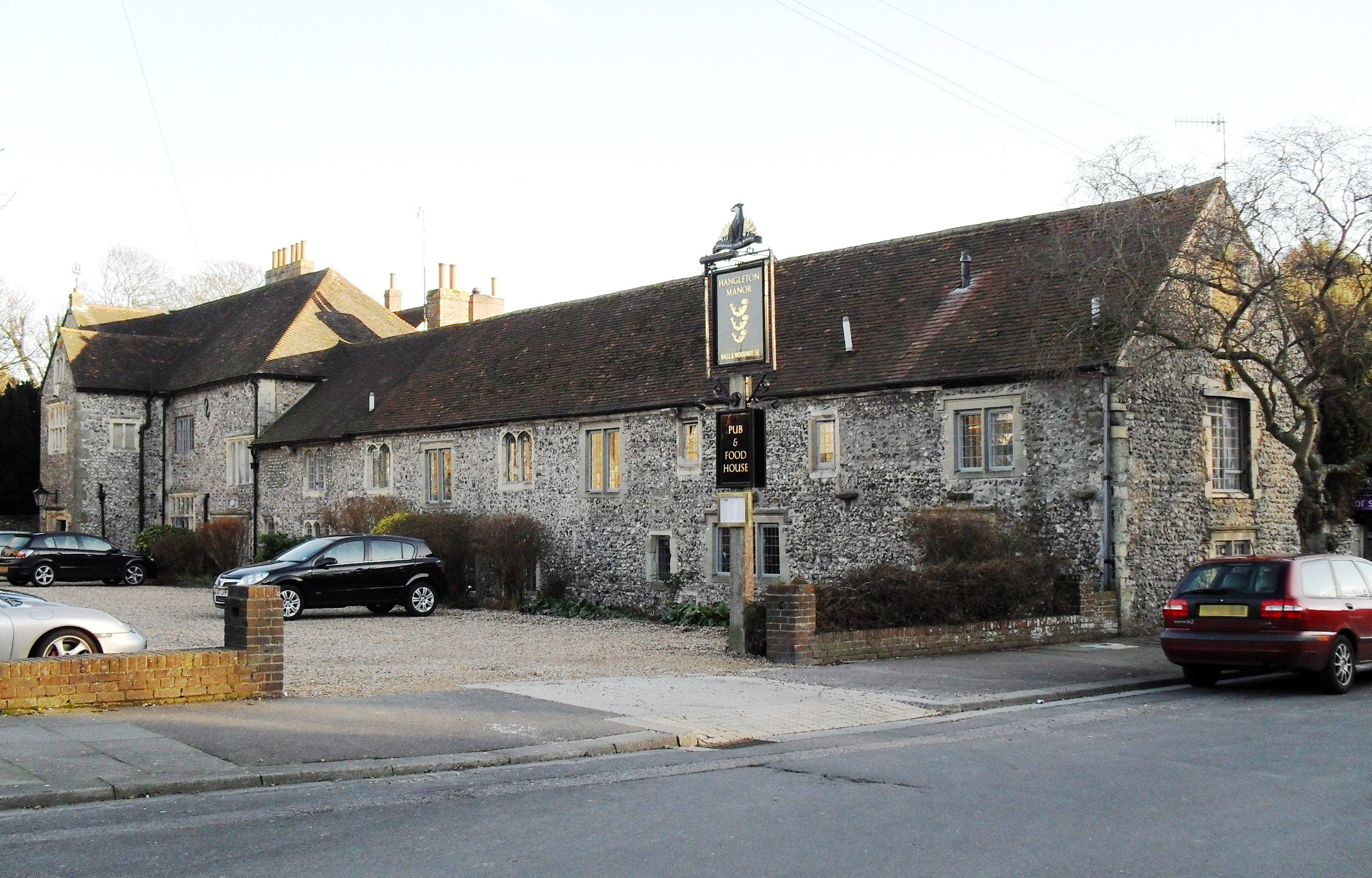
- The building from the northwest

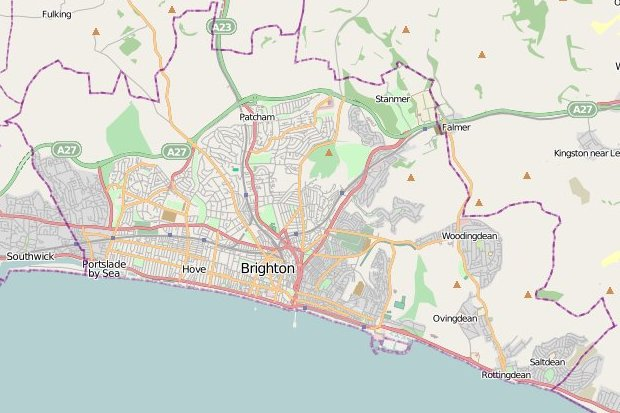
- Location of Hangleton Manor Inn within Brighton and Hove
- 50°50′53″N 0°12′19″W
- Location: Hangleton Valley Drive, Hangleton, Brighton and Hove, East Sussex BN3 8AN, United Kingdom

History
- Built: Late 15th century (Old Manor House); 1540s (main building)
- Built for: Richard Bellingham

Site notes
- Restored: 1988–89 (main building)

Listed Building – Grade II*
- Official name: Hangleton Manor Inn and The Old Manor House
- Designated: 8 November 1956
- Reference no.: 1187557

Hangleton Manor Inn, the adjoining Old Manor House and associated buildings form a bar and restaurant complex in Hangleton, an ancient village (and latterly a 20th-century housing estate) which is part of the English city of Brighton and Hove. The manor house is the oldest secular building in the Hove part of the city; some 15th-century features remain, and there has been little change since the High Sheriff of Sussex rebuilt it in the mid-16th century. Local folklore asserts that a 17th-century dovecote in the grounds has been haunted since a monk placed a curse on it. The buildings that comprise the inn were acquired by Hangleton Manor Ltd in 1968, and converted to an inn under the Whitbread banner. The brewery company Hall & Woodhouse have owned and operated it since 2005. English Heritage has listed the complex at Grade II* for its architectural and historical importance, and the dovecote is listed separately at Grade II.

== History ==
The manor of Hangleton has Saxon origins. At the time of the Domesday survey in 1086, it was owned by William de Warenne, 1st Earl of Surrey and held by another Norman nobleman, William de Wateville. He was the tenant of several manors in the area, including Bristelmestune (present-day Brighton). The parish of Hangleton covered 1,120 acres (450 ha) of the South Downs northwest of Brighton, and consisted mostly of grazing land and chalk downland. Its three main features were on a northeast–southwest alignment: to the northeast, a small village; to the southwest of this, the medieval St Helen's Church and a small pond; and further southwest, the manor house. The village suffered depopulation in the medieval period (perhaps because of greater enclosure for sheep farming, a fire or, most likely, the Black Death). A survey in 1603 recorded only one house in the parish (other than Hangleton Manor and another manor house at Benfields, towards the southwest corner of the parish), and as late as 1931 the population was only 109.

The tenancy of the manor passed through several families, including the locally prominent de Cockfields and de Poynings (members of which held it for about 200 years from the 13th century), until in 1538 it came into the possession of Richard Bellingham of nearby Newtimber. He was High Sheriff of Sussex for a time during the mid-16th century. During his 15-year ownership, he rebuilt the main part of the building. Stones from the 12th-century Lewes Priory, demolished in 1537 during the Dissolution of the Monasteries, were used and are still visible in the east wall.

Further alteration took place later in the 16th century. Part of the building was converted into a scullery, several new windows were inserted along with a door in the porch; a grand staircase was added; and the eastern part of the house was given a new roof and became a single long room with three large windows in the east wall.

The Old Manor House—a long, low wing adjoining the main building on the north and west side—dates from the 15th century. It has also been altered, but an original doorway remains and some windows of a similar age were inserted into its walls during the 16th-century rebuilding work. Originally used as stables and servants' accommodation, it was later converted into farm buildings and leased by the then-owners of the manor (the Sackville family, whose members held it for over 300 years from 1601) to William Hardwick who was at one time a Brighton exciseman. His sons and their heirs continued to lease the manor and farm for several generations.<St. Helen's parish records & Hangleton tax records > This use ceased by the mid-20th century, and all separate buildings associated with the farm were demolished. By the 1970s, it had been converted into a house.

After farming operations ceased, the main building became an inn and hotel (the Hangleton Manor Hotel). Some renovation work took place in the late 1980s. Various licensees operated it until September 2005, when the brewery company Hall & Woodhouse bought the premises for more than £1,000,000. It now operates under the name Hangleton Manor Inn as a tied house.

== Architecture ==
Hangleton Manor Inn's 15th- and 16th-century origins make it Hove's oldest secular building. Flint has always been plentiful around the South Downs—several ancient mines (up to 5,000 years old in some cases) have been found across Sussex—and many buildings on the south face of the Downs are built of the material. Hangleton Manor's buildings are of plain (mostly knapped) flint with some stone and ashlar dressings and quoins. The roofs are hipped and laid with clay tiles, and there are several chimney-stacks at irregular intervals. The complex is L-shaped; the longest (northwest) side is formed by the long, two-storey 15th-century range (the Old Manor House section). A 1925 study noted that it resembled Glynde Place, a flint house of a similar vintage (1560s) at Glynde, near Lewes. The buildings and their grounds are sunk into a sheltered hollow in the undulating downland, which allowed a wide range of plants to be grown when it was still a farm.

The Old Manor House part of the building is a two-storey wing with eight bays and a series of regularly spaced windows (all 20th-century replacements of the older windows inserted during the 16th-century rebuilding work) with either square or Tudor arch heads. The west end has a gable. Adjoining its east end is the main building, of two-and-a-half storeys and five bays, with a slightly off-centre two-storey gable-roofed entrance porch in the centre bay. The easternmost bay is gable-ended and has a modern casement window. All other windows have hood moulds with intricate carvings, ovolo-style moulding, transoms and mullions. The eastern side of the main building has a three-bay range and is also two-and-a-half storeys in height. The windows in the outer bays are small and have wooden hood moulds. The centre window is much larger.

Inside, alterations have removed some of the original features, but much still remains. A room to the east of the entrance has Corinthian-style pilasters with volute capitals and various carvings, including inscriptions such as the Ten Commandments; it is believed it may have originally been a private chapel, and the wood on which the Commandments and other inscriptions are carved is known to be 17th-century. The room also has high-quality late-16th-century panelling and floor tiles, a Tudor-style moulded ceiling with heraldic emblems, and a piscina (again suggesting a former religious use for this part of the building). The main staircase winds round a square newel and has candle-holders, and in the attic there are the remains of an older staircase of similar design, with oak treads and chamfering.

== Dovecote ==
Hangleton Manor Dovecote
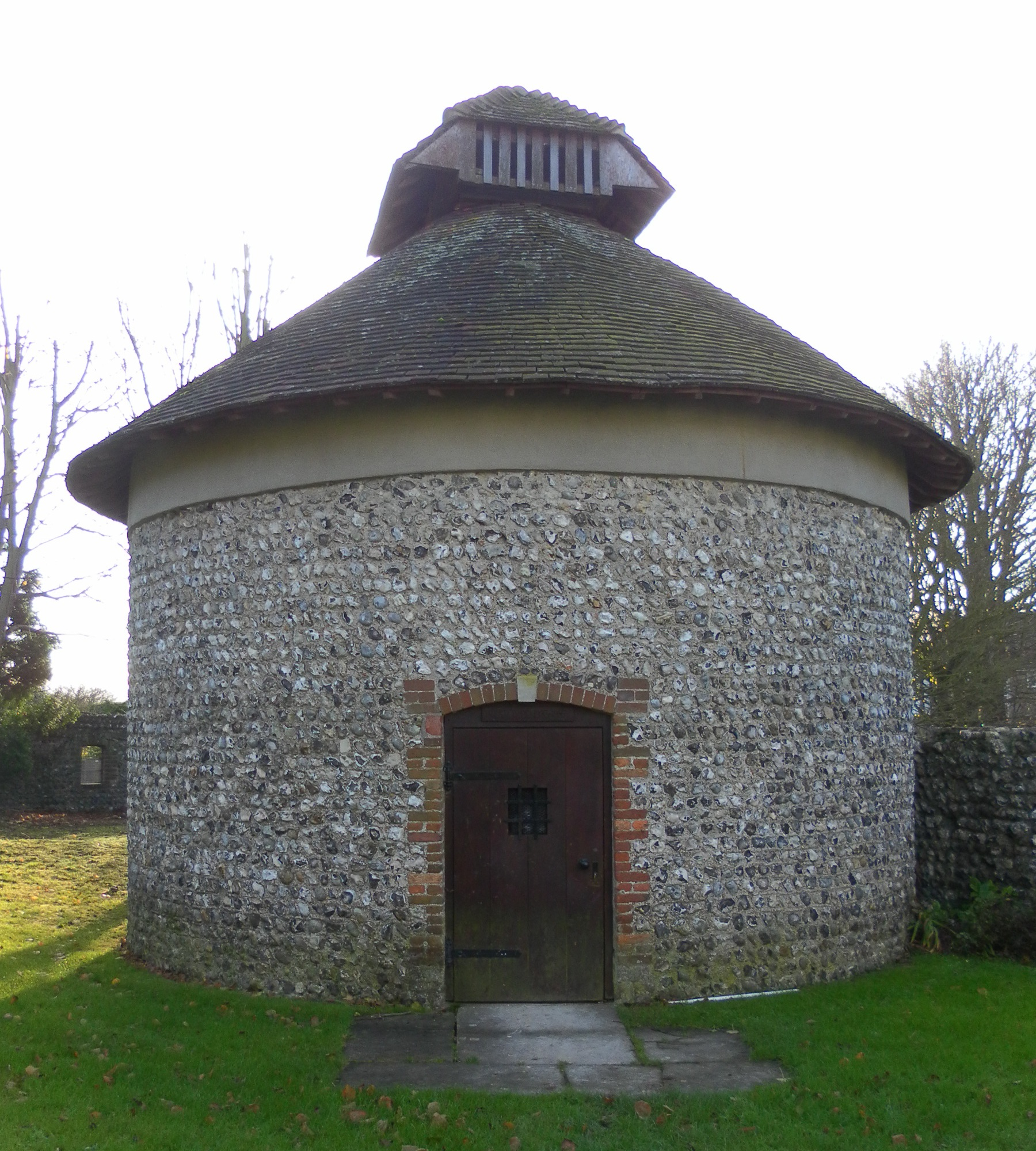
- Interactive map of Hangleton Manor Dovecote

Listed Building – Grade II
- Official name: Dovecote about 20 metres south of Hangleton Manor Inn
- Designated: 24 March 1950
- Reference no.: 1298635

A 17th-century dovecote stands in the grounds of the inn. It is circular, built of small flint cobbles laid in a coursed formation. The cone-shaped roof is laid with tiles of clay and sits on top of a frieze of cement. It was restored from a ruinous state in the 1980s: the walls were crumbling and the roof had caved in. The potence (a combined ladder and perch), a standard feature of dovecotes, has a distinctive design, resembling a gate. It, like the roof, has been renewed. The capacity has been variously recorded as 526 or 535 birds, accommodated on blocks of chalk. The wooden door, facing north, has a glazed grille of wrought iron. All restoration work was carried out over several years by a group of volunteers working Wednesdays and Sundays. The work was completed in April 1988 at a cost of about £10,000. It was formally opened by the mayor of Hove in May 1988.

Early in the dovecote's existence, a monk—angered by the droppings left by the birds, placed a curse on it. Since then, the building has reputedly been haunted by ghost pigeons.

== The buildings today ==
Hangleton Manor and the Old Manor House were jointly listed at Grade II* on 8 November 1956. Such buildings are defined as being "particularly important ... [and] of more than special interest". As of February 2001, they formed one of 70 Grade II*-listed buildings and structures, and 1,218 listed buildings of all grades, in the city of Brighton and Hove.

The dovecote was listed at Grade II by English Heritage on 24 March 1950. This grade is given to "nationally important" buildings of "special interest". As of February 2001, it was one of 1,124 Grade II listed buildings in the city.

The inn is operated as a pub and restaurant by Dorset-based brewery Hall & Woodhouse. The building has two separate bars, a 50-capacity restaurant and extensive gardens. There are also living quarters on site.

== Bibliography ==
- Brighton Polytechnic. School of Architecture and Interior Design (1987). A Guide to the Buildings of Brighton. Macclesfield: McMillan Martin. ISBN 1-869865-03-0.
- Dawson, Brian (1998). Flint Buildings in West Sussex. Chichester: West Sussex County Council (County Planning Department). ISBN 0-86260-421-4.
- Middleton, Judy (1979). A History of Hove. Chichester: Phillimore & Co. ISBN 0-85033-325-3.
- Nairn, Ian; Pevsner, Nikolaus (1965). The Buildings of England: Sussex. Harmondsworth: Penguin Books. ISBN 0-14-071028-0.
- Stuart, Donald (2005). Old Sussex Inns. Derby: The Breedon Books Publishing Co. ISBN 1-85983-448-5.
- Wolseley, 2nd Viscountess (1925). Some of the Smaller Manor Houses of Sussex. London: The Medici Society.
