= Portrait of Giovanna Tornabuoni =

1488 painting by Domenico Ghirlandaio

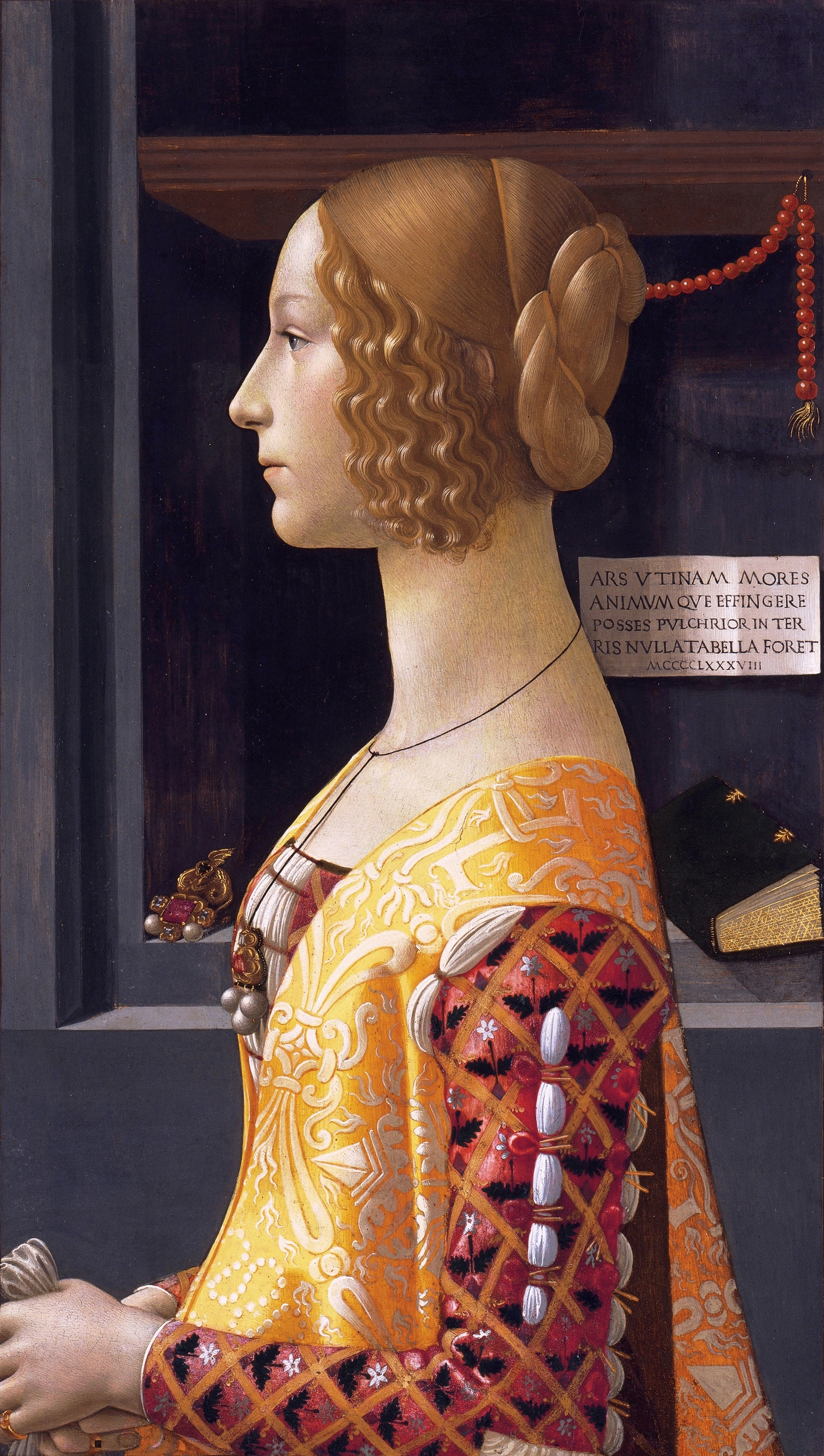
- Artist: Domenico Ghirlandaio
- Year: 1488
- Medium: Tempera on panel
- Dimensions: 77 cm × 49 cm (30 in × 19 in)
- Location: Thyssen-Bornemisza Museum, Madrid

The Portrait of Giovanna Tornabuoni (also known as Portrait of Giovanna degli Albizzi) is a painting by the Italian Renaissance painter Domenico Ghirlandaio, executed in 1488 and located in the Museo Thyssen-Bornemisza, Madrid. The portrait was commissioned by Lorenzo Tornabuoni after his wife's death in 1488 and includes many symbolic details.

== Description ==
The painting portrays Giovanna degli Albizzi, a Florentine noblewoman who was married to Lorenzo Tornabuoni. She died while pregnant with their second child in 1488, the year specified on the cartellino (Italian for a slip of paper) in the background. It was commissioned by her husband, Lorenzo Tornabuoni, and the portrait was actually painted about two years after her death, around 1489-90, for the Tornabuoni family. She has been identified thanks to her other portraits in the Tornabuoni Chapel and a medal of Giovanna, also by Ghirlandaio, where she has the same hair style.

It depicts the young woman from the side in a linear, ornamental arrangement which was common for the time. This profile portrait was the common style of 15th century Florentine portraiture. The figure is wearing precious clothes including a gamurra vest. On the right, behind her, are a hanging coral necklace (perhaps a rosary), a partly closed prayer book, and a Latin inscription, taken from an epigram by the 1st century AD poet Martial. She also holds a handkerchief. The figure of Giovanna is idealized in appearance and proportion which was the tradition of the time.

== Symbolism ==
Many aspects of this portrait hold symbolic significance in emphasizing her wealth, status, and piety. Giovanna's fine clothing indicates her status and the wealth of her family. The Tornabuoni emblem is present on her clothes, as well as two "Ls" on her shoulder, referring to her husband, Lorenzo. These emblems denote Giovanna's family and illustrate where the visible wealth comes from. In addition to the clothes, the presence of pearls and brooches also emphasizes the family's wealth. The pendant featured in the portrait shows a small diamond set in gold above a large ruby with three pearls hanging beneath it. This was a signature ornament found in depictions of Giovanna and came from her sister-in-law Lodovica's dowry.

Another symbol within the portrait is the string of coral beads. The coral beads seen in the background are likely a rosary, signifying Giovanna's religious piety. During the Renaissance, coral also had many connotations. It was believed to ward against evil, aid in fertility, and was associated with the blood of Christ.

The book seen behind Giovanna, possibly a prayer book, also refers to her piety and educated status.

A significant aspect of the background in this portrait is the cartellino behind Giovanna. The inscription is a modified excerpt of a poem by the author Martial. The epigram reads: "ARS VTINAM MORES ANIMVM QVE EFFINGERE POSSES PVLCHRIOR IN TERRIS NVLLA TABELLA FORET MCCCCLXXXVIII". This translates to "Art, would that you could represent character and mind! There would be no more beautiful painting on earth 1488". This epigram refers to both the virtue of the sitter whom it is positioned behind and the skill of the painter. By referring to Giovanna's beauty, Ghirlandaio conveys the beauty of the sitter reflects their morality. The adjustments to the epigram were likely a done by Poliziano, one of Lorenzo's teachers.

== Analysis ==
Portrait of Giovanna Tornabuoni has been extensively studied. It has been x-rayed as well as analyzed with ultra-violet, infra-red, and cross-section techniques. Through these analyses it was found that the painting was created with a brush underdrawing. There are several differences between the underdrawing and the final painting, including the positioning of the hands and the included accessories. The hands were initially held higher, but were lowered in the finished piece into a less assertive position. The necklace Giovanna is wearing in the final portrait was originally a string of beads and featured a different pendant. The other accessories in the background were not present in the underdrawing. Ghirlandaio also modified the hair styling and the curves of the figure's body. Overall the final portrait was more idealized than the original underdrawing.

== Provenance ==
The portrait was originally placed in the camera del palcho d'oro (Italian for the chamber with the golden beams) in Lorenzo Tornabuoni's suite in the Tornabuoni palace. The presence of the portrait in a public space of the palace commemorated Giovanna's death. During this time, portraits of deceased individuals served to record lineage, exemplify important figures, and commemorate loved ones. This portrait likely presented Giovanna as an exemplary figure in the Tornabuoni palace.

The painting later came into the possession of the Pandolfini family. By 1878 it was in Brighton in the collection of Henry Willett and was sold to the dealer Charles Sedelmeyer for £1600 between 1895 and 1896. Afterwards it was in the collection of Rodolphe Kann and was sold via Joseph Duveen to J. P. Morgan in 1907. It was on display in the Morgan Library & Museum until 1935 when it was sold by J. P. Morgan Jr. to Heinrich Thyssen.
