= Giovanna degli Albizzi =

Italian noblewoman and artist's model (1468–1488)

Giovanna Tornabuoni
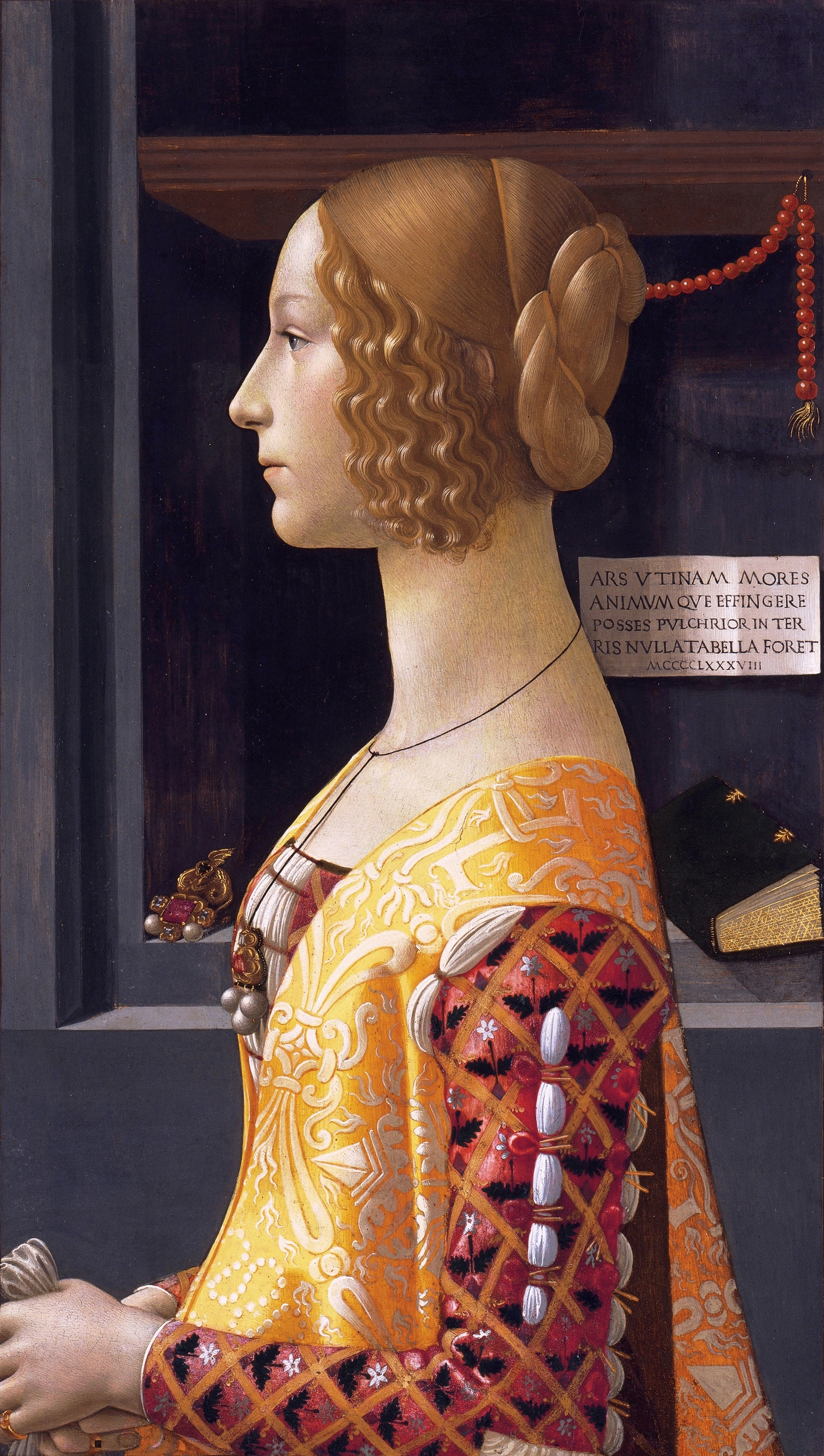
- Posthumous portrait of Giovanna by Domenico Ghirlandaio
- Born: Giovanna degli Albizzi; 18 December 1468; Florence
- Died: 7 October 1488 (aged 19)
- Burial place: Santa Maria Novella
- Spouse: Lorenzo Tornabuoni
- Children: Giovanni Tornabuoni
- Father: Tommaso degli Albizzi

Giovanna degli Albizzi (married name Tornabuoni, 1468–1488) was an Italian noblewoman best known as the model for figures in wall paintings and a portrait by Domenico Ghirlandaio. After her marriage to Lorenzo Tornabuoni in 1486, for which Boticelli painted a double mural thought to depict the pair, she was portrayed in a mural of the Visitation and a posthumous half-length portrait. She bore a son and heir, and died while pregnant with her second child at the age of nineteen.

== Life ==
She was born Giovanna degli Albizzi in Florence in 1468 to the nobleman Tommaso degli Albizzi.

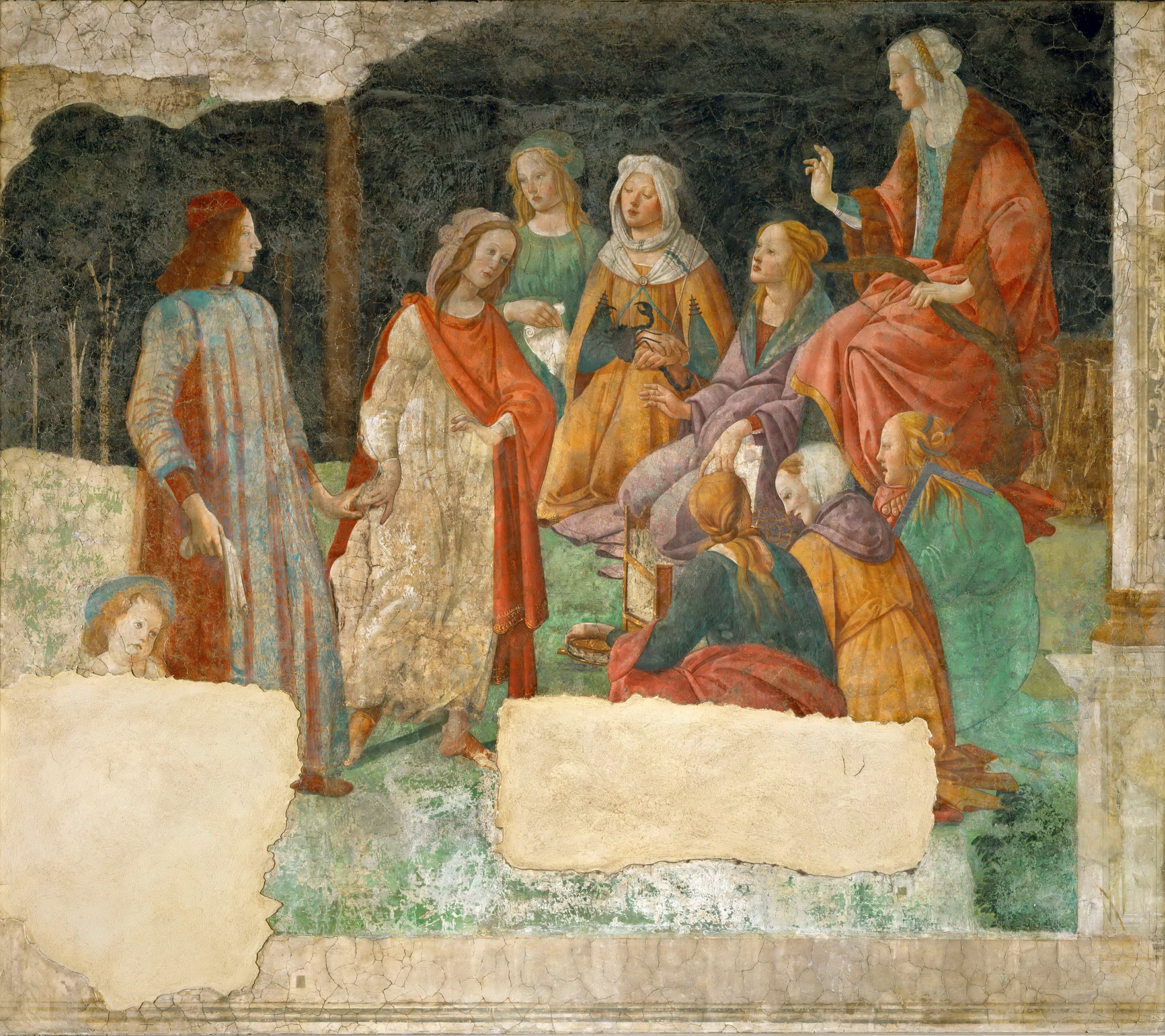
Boticelli's mural is thought to depict Lorenzo Tornabuoni, A Young Man Being Introduced to the Seven Liberal Arts

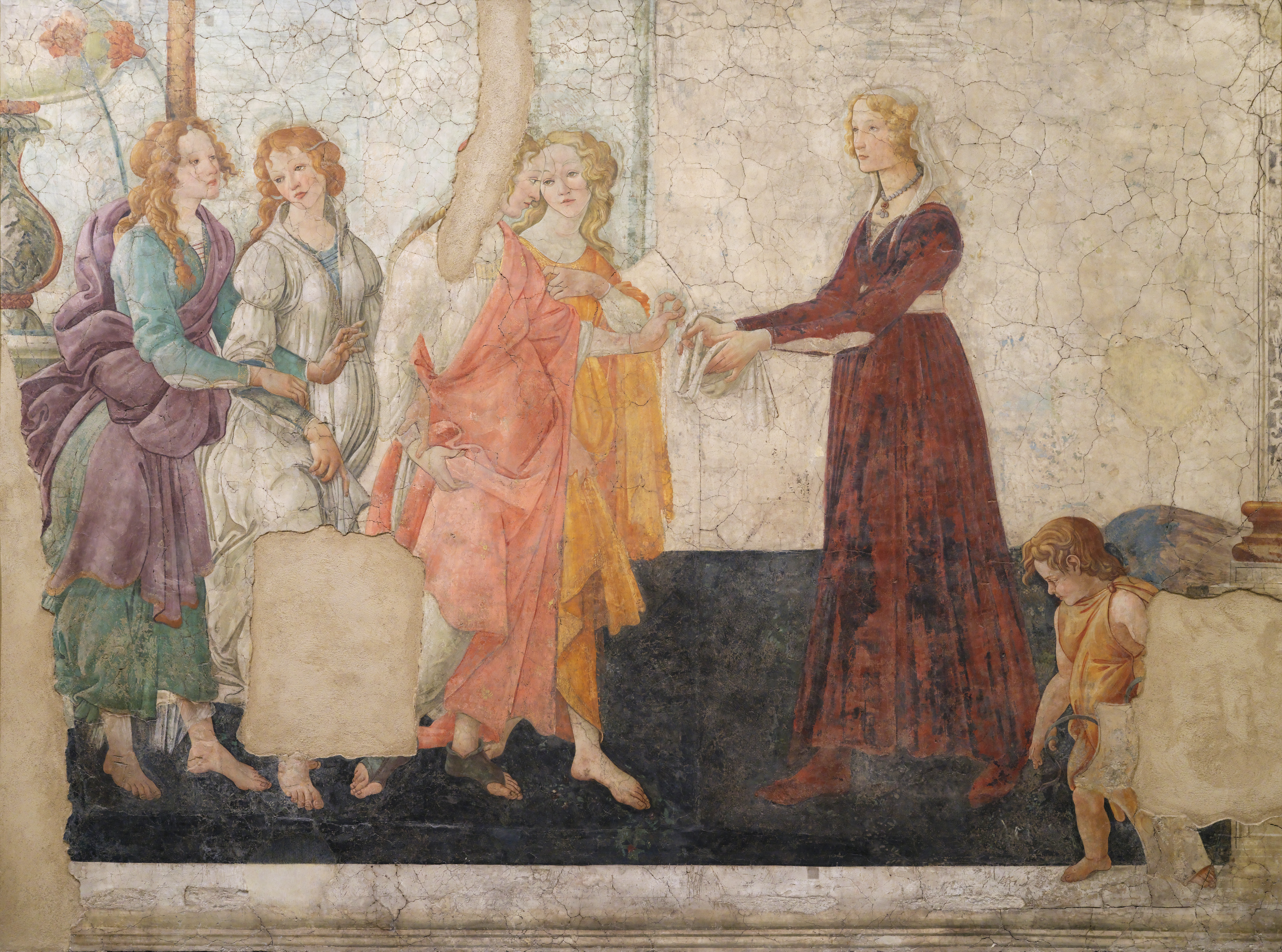
Boticelli's mural is thought to depict Giovanna on the right, receiving flowers from Venus.

She married her fellow wealthy Florenzian Lorenzo Tornabuoni on 15 June 1486, in a lavish wedding ceremony in which she was accompanied by 115 attendants. The celebrations included banquets and dances on specially-constructed wooden platforms near the palaces of the Tornabuoni and Albizzi palaces.

Boticelli painted two frescoes to commemorate the wedding: a scene of Grammar leading Lorenzo to meet the personifications of the Seven Liberal Arts, and Venus and the Three Graces presenting flowers to the bride.

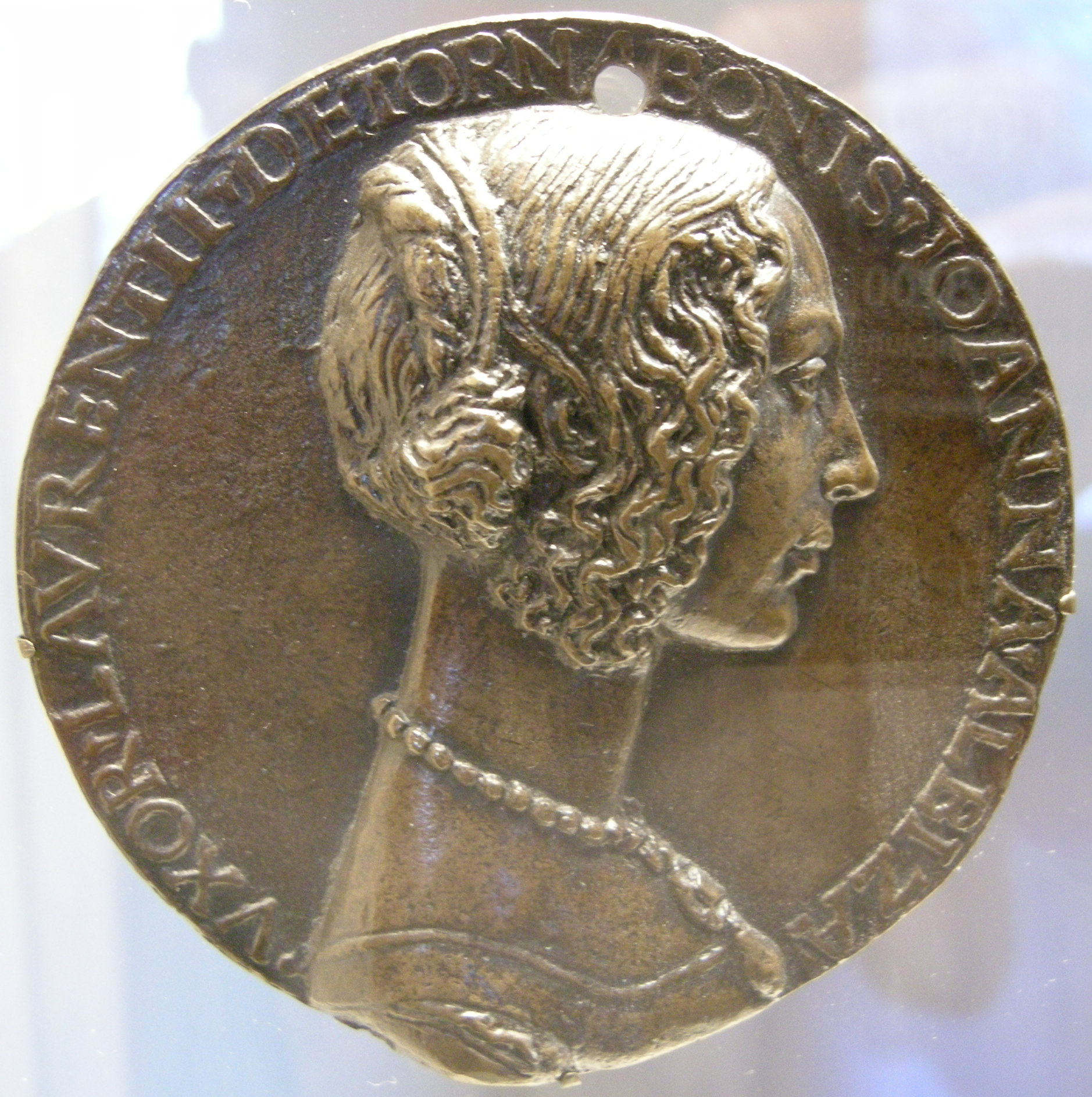
Medallion depicting Giovanna, which helped establish the connection between all the portraits of her.

Lorenzo commissioned two medallions depicting her, including one attributed to Niccoló Fiorentino. These medallions contain her likeness and name, which allowed her features to be identified in the paintings of her.

She was painted for two murals in the Tornabuoni Chapel in the church of Santa Maria Novella, in a scene of the birth of John the Baptist and one of the Visitation, leading a crowd of spectators at the head of the Tornabuoni family to watch Mary and Elizabeth celebrating their respective pregnancies. The women in these murals have been connected because of the identical necklace they wear.

She had their child, Giovanni, in October 1487.

On 7 October 1488, while pregnant with her second child, Giovanna died at the age of nineteen. She was buried at the church of Santa Maria Novella.

== Commemoration ==
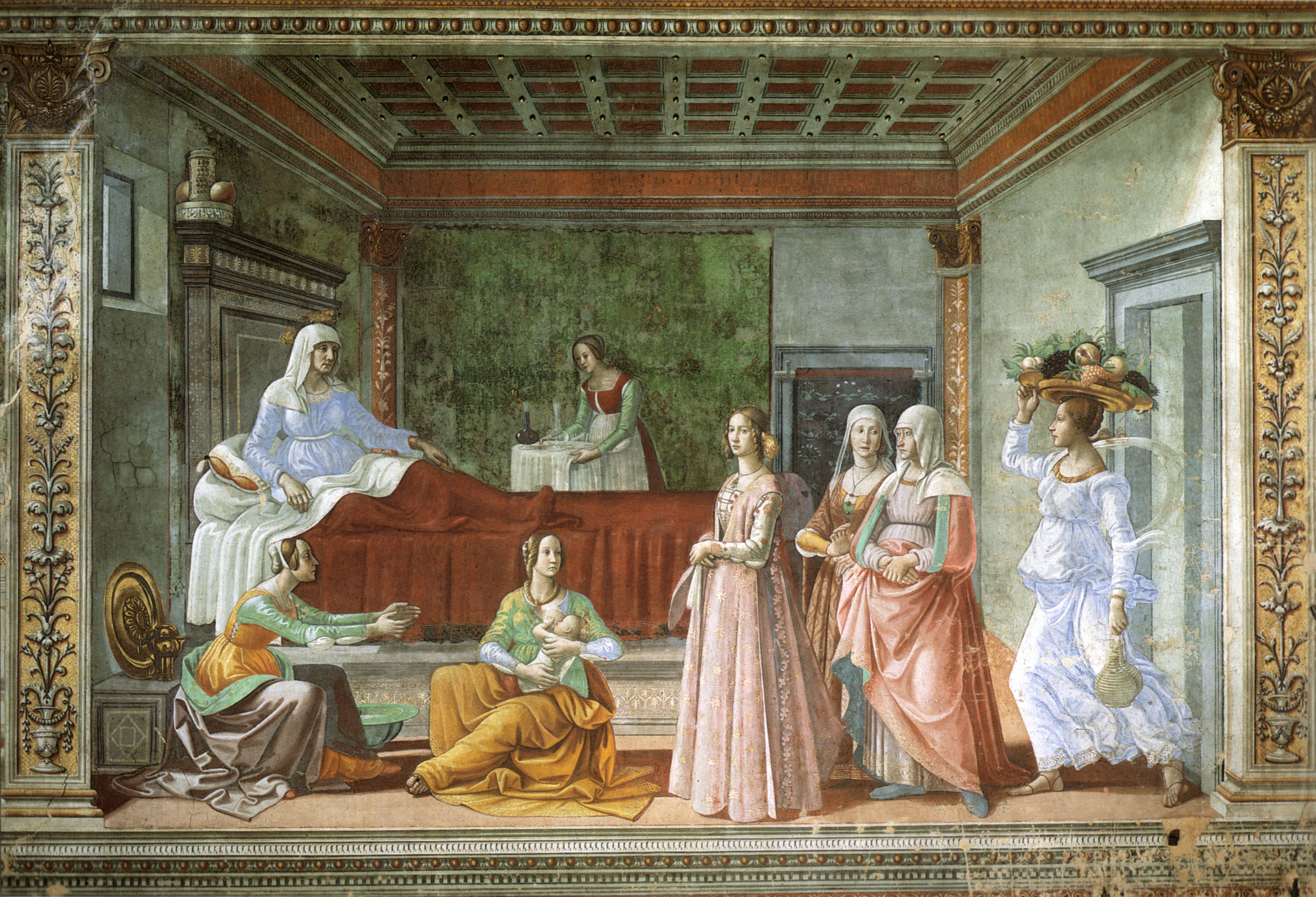
Birth of the Baptist Giovanna at the right

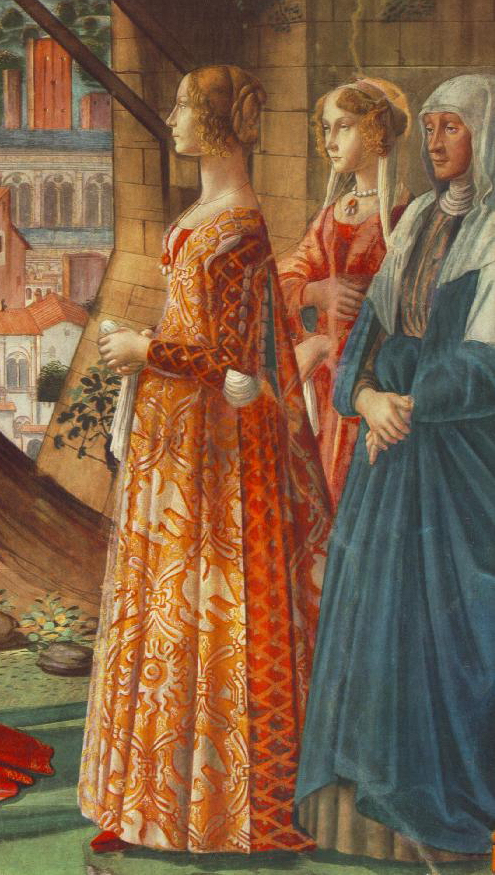
Detail of the Visitation mural in Santa Maria Novella, where Giovanna is shown in profile.

In 1489/90, after her death, Ghirlandaio painted a half-length portrait of her, based on the figure from the fresco of the Visitation, or the cartoon made for it. The epigram reads ‘O Art, if thou were able to depict conduct and the soul, no lovelier painting would exist on earth.’ The painting, including its increasingly old-fashioned profile pose and the symbolism of the objects it contains, has been much studied.

Perhaps in recognition that she had given birth to an heir, Giovanna was commemorated by her husband and father-in-law. Her father-in-law provided a marble sepulchre for her in the church of Santa Maria Novella in his will of 1490, and Lorenzo paid for masses to be said for her soul for a hundred years in his chapel in the church of Cestello, Florence, which was dedicated to her. The altarpiece for this church, also painted by Ghirlandaio in 1491, was another depiction of the Visitation. The choice of Mary's pregnancy as a subject may be another reference to Giovanna's role as bearer of Lorenzo's heir.

An inventory of the Tornabuoni household in 1497 reveals that her husband kept her portrait beside his room, even when he was married to his second wife.
