= Hangleton =

Suburb of Hove, in Sussex, England

Coordinates: 50°51′N 0°12′W

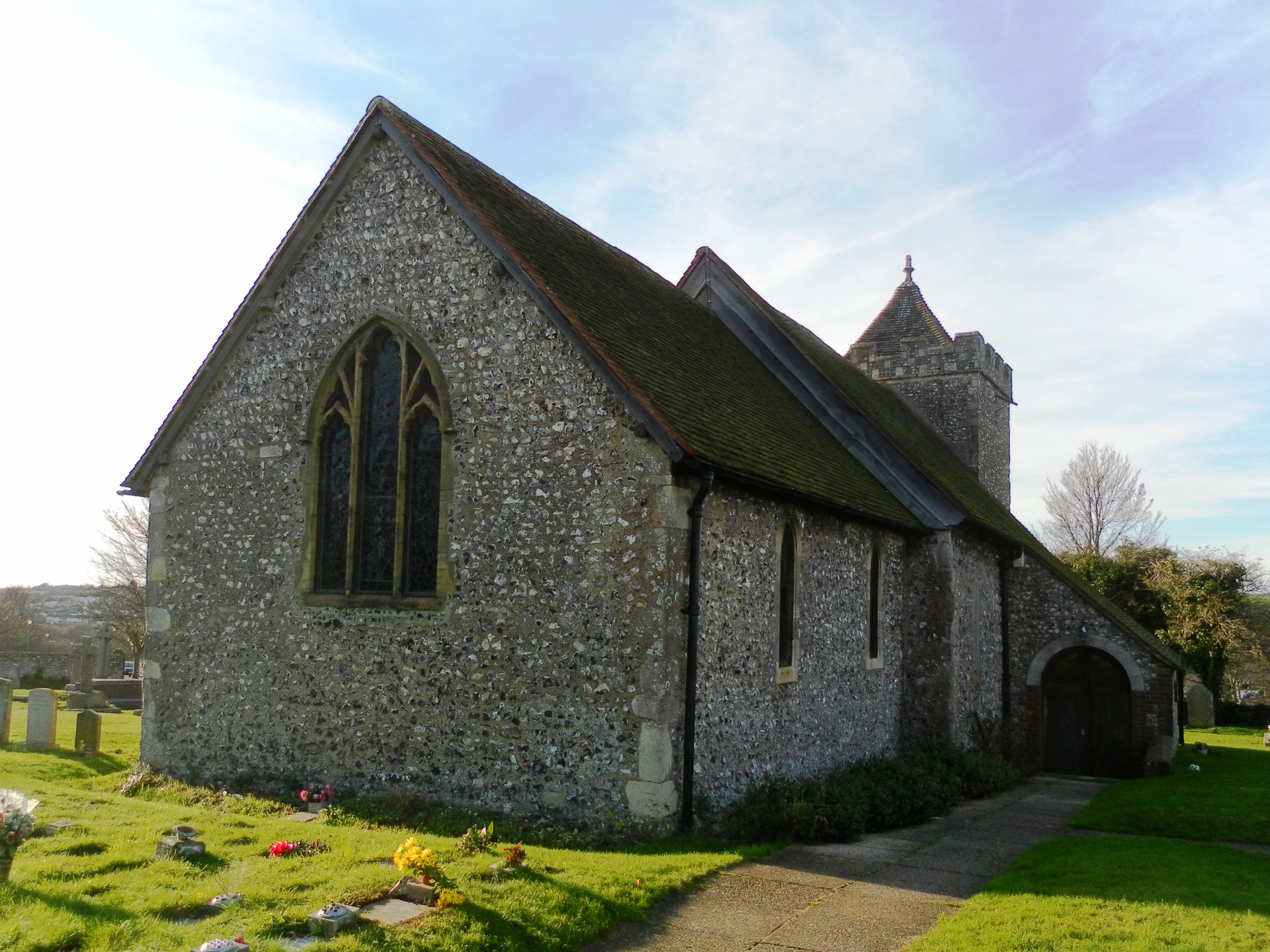
- The 12th-century St Helen's Church

- Location within the United Kingdom
- Population: 14,720
- Unitary authority: Brighton and Hove
- Ceremonial county: East Sussex
- Country: England
- Sovereign state: United Kingdom
- Post town: HOVE
- Postcode district: BN3
- Dialling code: 01273
- UK Parliament: Hove and Portslade

Hangleton is a suburb of Brighton and Hove, in the ceremonial county of East Sussex, England. The area was developed in the 1930s after it was incorporated into the Borough of Hove, but has ancient origins: its parish church was founded in the 11th century and retains 12th-century fabric; the medieval manor house is Hove's oldest secular building. The village became depopulated in the medieval era and the church fell into ruins, and the population in the isolated hilltop parish only reached 100 in the early 20th century; but rapid 20th-century development resulted in more than 6,000 people living in Hangleton in 1951 and over 9,000 in 1961. By 2013, the population exceeded 14,000.

The church and manor house (now a pub) are now surrounded by modern development. Following the parish's incorporation into the Borough of Hove in 1928, a mixture of council housing and lower-density private houses were built between the 1930s and the 1950s, along with facilities such as shopping parades, schools and more churches and pubs. Regular bus links were developed to other parts of Hove and Brighton, but a short-lived railway that ran through the area had closed by the time residential development got underway.

== Etymology ==
The spelling of Hangleton has varied over the centuries: ten variants were recorded between the time of the Domesday survey (Hangetone or Hangeton) and the 17th century. The meaning of the name is not known for certain, but most sources suggest an Old English phrase meaning "the farm by the sloping wood".

== History ==
=== Early history ===
The present Hangleton Lane is an ancient trackway used since prehistoric times. It was also used by the Romans as part of their route from London to their port at the river Adur in present-day Southwick. A small village gradually developed around a bend on this trackway, close to the church and original manor house. The rest of the parish (Note: This was rectangular in size, longer from north to south and covering 1,120 acres (450 ha).) was downland forming part of the South Downs; Round Hill, around which the track ran and which has traces of ancient field systems, rises to 445 feet (136 m). The parish of Portslade is to the west; West Blatchington is to the east; the parishes of Hove and Aldrington lie to the south and south-east; and Brighton is further to the south-east beyond Hove. The English Channel is 2 miles (3.2 km) to the south and Lewes (the county town of East Sussex) lies 10.5 miles (16.9 km) to the east.

St Helen's Church was first documented in 1093 as a possession of Lewes Priory, to which it was granted by William de Warenne, 2nd Earl of Surrey. In the 16th century, its parish was united with that of St Nicolas Church, Portslade and later (in 1585) with that of St Peter's Church, West Blatchington before becoming a separate parish again. Hangleton and Portslade were united again between 1757 and 1951. The nave was built in the 12th century, the west tower was added a century later and the chancel dates from c. 1300. The last significant alteration to the structure was the removal of the chancel arch in the 14th century.

The village was small and largely agricultural: the inhabitants raised sheep and grew crops, especially grains and legumes. Some of the community were free peasants while others were villeins who provided the Lord of the manor with labour in exchange for the right to work the land. By 1300, it was "a thriving community of approximately 200 people", but during the 14th century decline set in: the population was unsustainably large, and a series of poor harvests around 1320 followed by the effects of the Black Death meant the village was almost wiped out. Only two householders were recorded in 1428, and even by the mid-19th century only about 80 people lived in the parish. The Ministry of Public Building and Works undertook an archaeological dig in summer 1954 and uncovered eight 13th- and 14th-century buildings and the remains of the parsonage north of the church, which had been destroyed by fire in 1666. The original manor house near the church also vanished and was replaced by a new building 1/4 mile (0.40 km) to the south-west in the 1540s. Richard Bellingham, Lord of the manor at the time, incorporated stones from Lewes Priory (Note: Partly demolished in 1537.) in the front of the house.

=== 20th century ===
In 1928, the Hangleton was absorbed into the Borough of Hove for administrative purposes (the ecclesiastical parish was still linked to Portslade). At the time of the census in 1931, the population of the parish was still only 109, but during that decade residential and commercial development started apace and continued after World War II. Housing spread north-westwards from Hove and Aldrington, especially from 1936 onwards, and the whole area was built over by the end of the 1950s. St Helen's Church, which was "still entirely isolated" in 1929 when it was kept locked except during services, became surrounded by houses; it was reopened for regular worship in 1949, having been used irregularly (sometimes as infrequently as once per year) since the mid-19th century. Housebuilding in the parish was largely complete by the end of the 1950s, although the population has continued to grow: at the 1951 census it was 6,158, rising to 9,006 in 1961 and an estimated 14,270 in 2013. Hangleton is popular both with families and with retired people, and the percentage of residents under the age of 16 is one of the highest of any ward in the city of Brighton and Hove.

The earliest housing was provided by Hove Borough Council and was mostly terraced or semi-detached. Also in the 1930s, but mostly in the 1950s, private developments of semi-detached houses and detached bungalows emerged, especially on the highest ground offering good views of the South Downs and the sea. There are also some low-rise blocks of flats. Many streets are lined with trees and extensive grass verges, some houses have large front gardens and the overall housing density is low; this especially in the north-west of the estate, where most of the privately developed bungalows are situated. The council housing is mostly in the north and east of the estate. Most houses built by the council are now owned by their occupiers; privately rented housing is the other main form of housing tenure.

In 1951, the parish had a population of 2,676. On 1 April 1974, the parish was abolished.

Hangleton Manor became a farmhouse and was still used as such until 1930 when the farm was broken up and the land allocated for residential development. The 16th-century building went through various uses (Note: Including a private house, a hotel and a restaurant.) and was requisitioned by the Army in World War II. It became a listed building in 1956, but it was in such poor condition that demolition was anticipated. Between 1964 and 1967, it was empty and suffered repeated vandalism, but in the latter year a plan to convert the building into flats was announced. Nothing came of this, but the following year a hotelier from Worthing bought the building and converted it into a country club. By 1976, it was a pub called the Hangleton Manor Inn and had been extensively restored. In the pub garden is a dovecote, also a listed building, dating from the 1680s. It was restored in 1988.

== Education ==
Hove Park School, one of the city's main secondary schools, was formed in 1979 by the merger of two older schools. The buildings date from 1935 and were built on a 12-acre (4.9 ha) site bought by East Sussex County Council in 1931–32.

King's School, Hove moved to a purpose-built site on Hangleton Way at the northern edge of Hangleton in 2018. It had been established in 2013 in the former Portslade Aldridge Community Academy premises in Portslade village. It is adjacent to West Blatchington Primary School, which dates from 1957. Hangleton Primary School incorporates the former Hangleton Infants School, opened in 1949, and Hangleton Junior School (1952).

== Geography ==
=== Hangleton downland ===
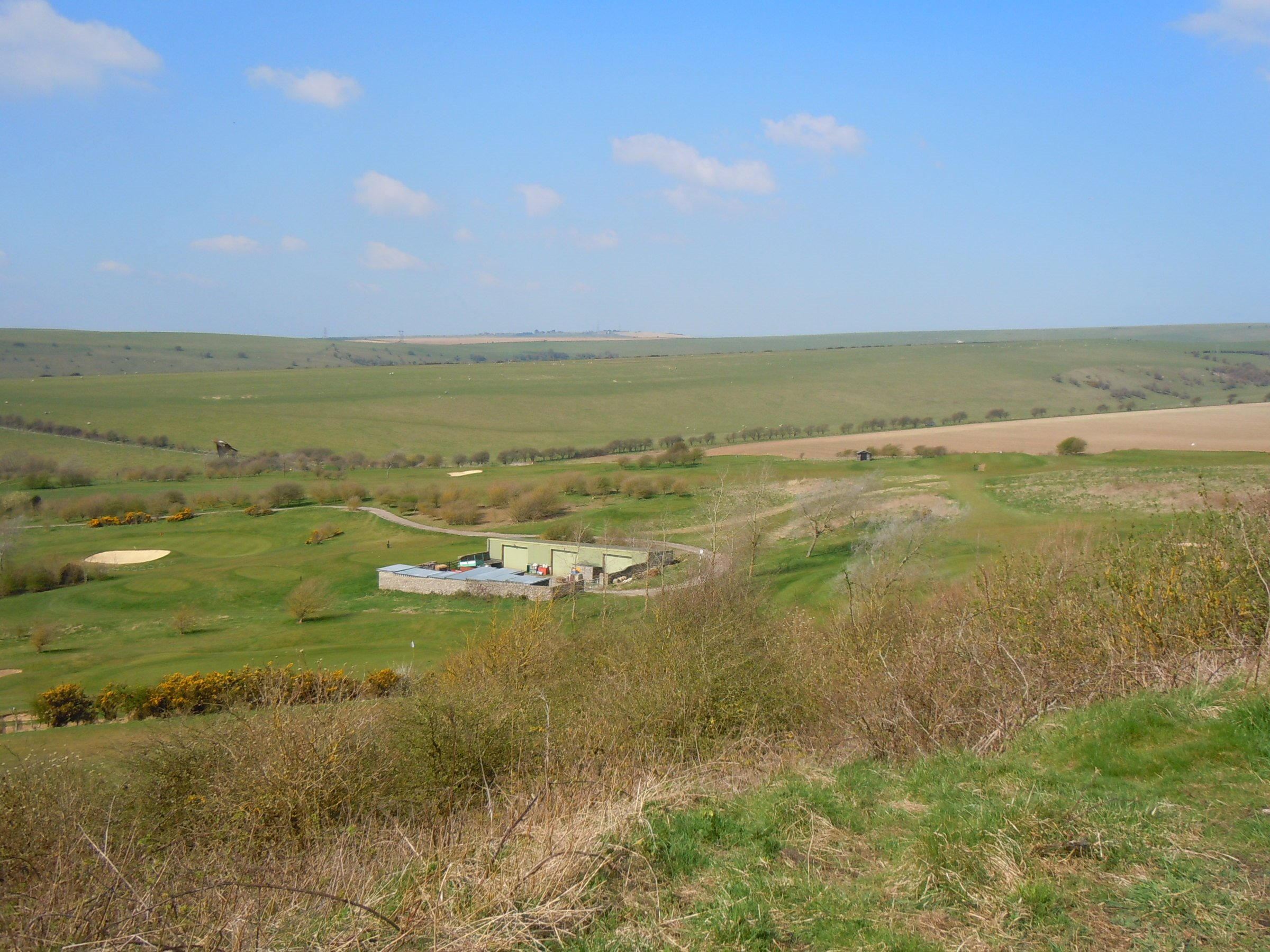
Views from the slopes of Round Hill, above Hangleton

To the north of the A27 is the Old Dyke Railway Trail, which follows part of the route taken by the old Dyke Railway Branch Line and takes walkers and cyclists up to Devil's Dyke beauty spot. It runs between two golf courses, the West Hove and Brighton and Hove Golf courses. Much of the trail across the Downs is on a hard surface.

There are many archaic Down pastures in the area. To the west is Benfield Hill (TQ 261 078), a Local Nature Reserve which is famous for its glowworm displays on midsummer evenings. On the steep east side of the hill there is large thyme, autumn gentian and many butterflies. Bee orchids can be also found in some years. On the western side of the Hill the gentle slope has longstanding populations of small blue and brown argus butterflies. The tall grass encourages magnificent displays of burnet moths.

To the north of the City boundary this secondary chalk grassland continues on Devil’s Dyke Farm land (TQ 260 095). A prehistoric barrow (TQ 258 094) marked that boundary, but is now only detectable by a slight rise in the fence line as it crosses the ploughed-out mound. In a good evening light you can see the lynchet lines of an Iron Age field system in Adder Bottom (TQ 253 101) just west of the Devil’s Dyke Farm.

Round Hill. to the north east, is a special place too. There are signs from a number of periods of human history. There are many old barrows in the area and even the name Skeleton Hovel for the old flint barn (TQ 269 085) is thought to commemorate a prehistoric burial site unwittingly discovered during farming work. Round Hill's eastern slope (TQ 269 085) is the richest chalk grassland site in Hangleton, although it desperately needs grazing management for its many downland flowers such as field fleawort, chalk milkwort, orchids, cowslips, hairy violet, rockrose, crested hair-grass and devil’s bit scabious. There are two rare Forester moth species, fox moth and heath moth, purse-web spider, moss and pygmy snails. To the north of Round Hill is the Newtimber parish.

To the north of this part of Brighton and Hove downland area are the Poynings and Newtimber parishes and the notable geography of Devil's Dyke.

=== Toads Hole Valley ===
Between Hangleton and Westdene, south of the A27, is Toads Hole Valley. Its west slope, below Downland Drive was once a rich, grazed downland area, and it is still home to threatened species such as dormice, hedeghogs and adders. The valley has been unmanaged for many years and the area has turned to scrub. It has now been designated for development and up to three hundred homes are planned to be built on the site.

== Amenities ==
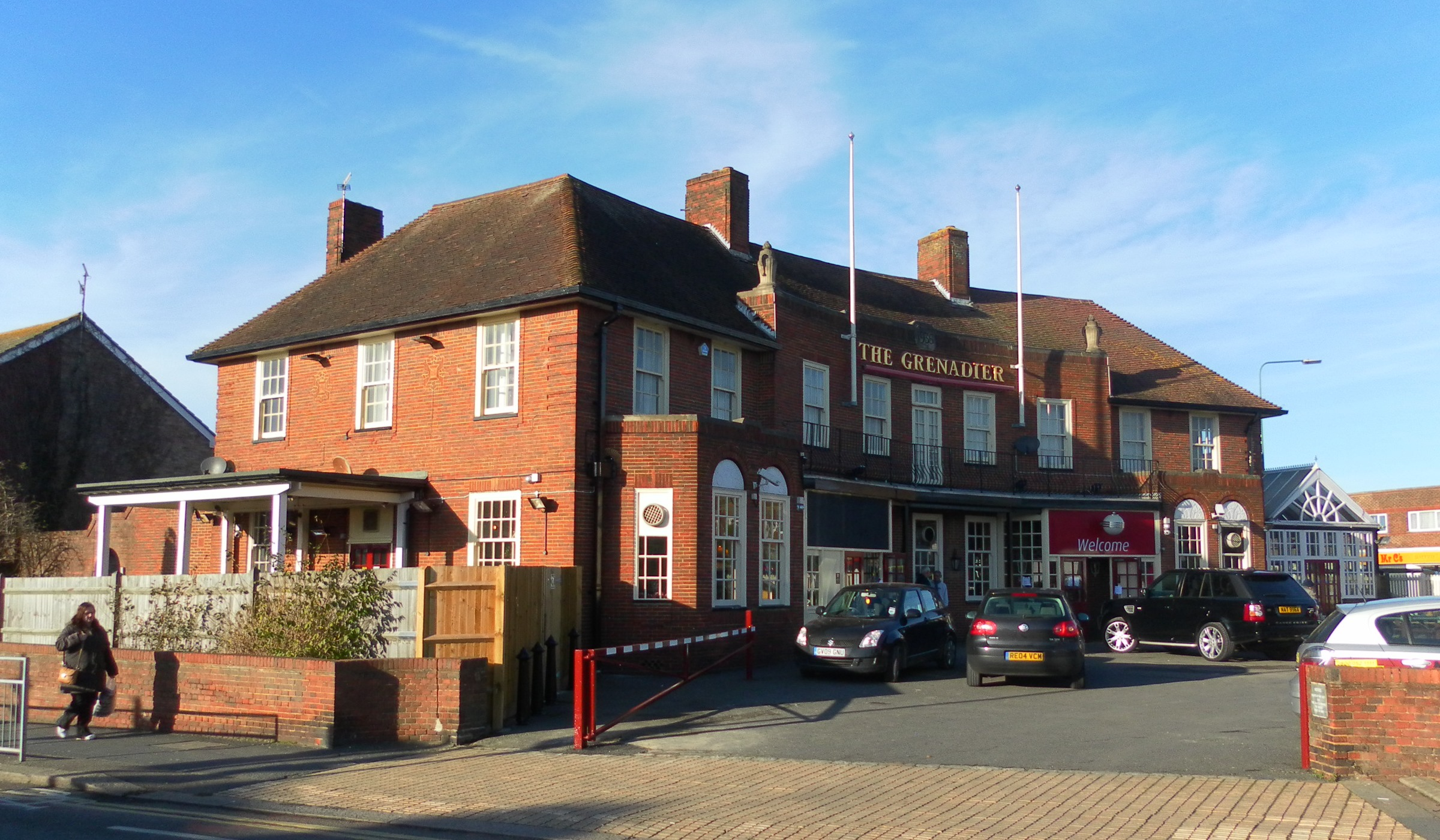
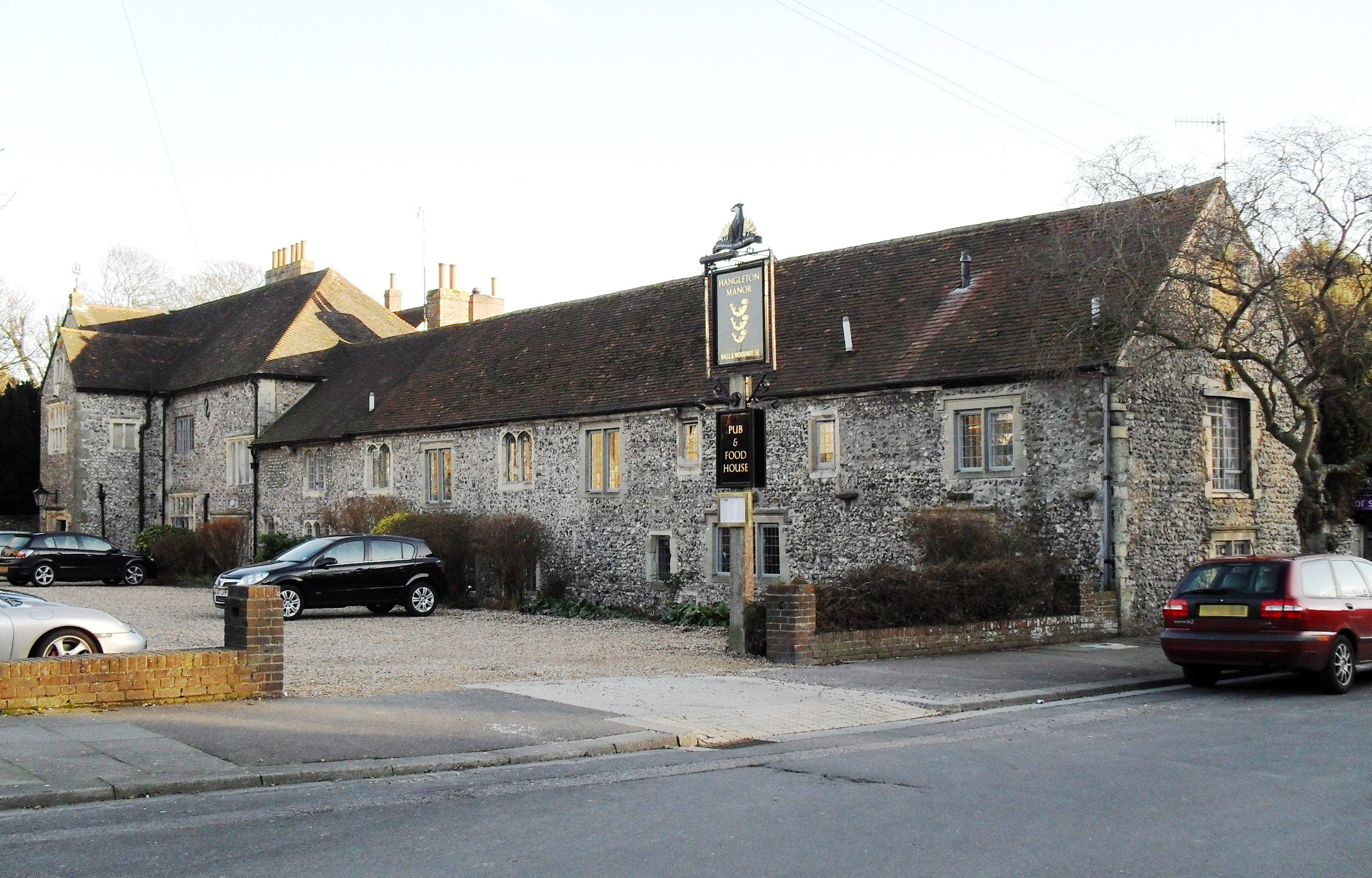
The Grenadier pub (left) and Hangleton Manor Inn

Hangleton is primarily residential, but there is a local shopping area near the Grenadier pub and Hangleton Library; a doctors' surgery is also part of this development. There are three smaller shopping parades in other parts of the estate. The nearest supermarket, the Sainsbury's at West Hove, is immediately south of Hangleton. Industrial development is minimal: there are two "small industrial yards".

Hangleton Manor Inn occupies the 16th-century manor house and is a Grade II* listed building. It has been operated as a tied house by the Hall & Woodhouse brewery since September 2005. The Grenadier pub, designed by John Leopold Denman for the Kemp Town Brewery of Brighton, opened in 1935. It had a well-planted garden which the Brighton Herald described as "one of the most beautiful in Hove", but this was lost in 1968 when shops and flats were built on it. The pub is operated by Mitchells & Butlers under their Sizzling Pubs brand.

Tamplin's Brewery of Brighton bought land for a pub at the north end of the estate in 1948, and The Downsman opened in 1956. A large area of open land believed to be a site of archaeological interest was retained next to it. After various name changes in the 1990s it reverted to its original name, but in closed in 2014 and permission was granted in 2017 for demolition and replacement with 33 houses and flats.

Hangleton Library was built in 1962 and was opened by the Queen and the Duke of Edinburgh that summer. The building, which incorporates a block of flats, cost £22,460. Before this, two temporary libraries had operated since the 1940s: one on the Knoll Estate and another in Hounsom Memorial Church hall. Hangleton Community Centre is in Hangleton Park; it opened in 1988 and cost £250,000 to build, most of which came from a grant by Hove Borough Council. Local architect Robin Chandler designed the building.

The park itself covers 10 acres (4.0 ha) of land in the north-east of the estate. Further south, St Helen's Park is "[the] grandiose name for...a large stretch of grass" covering 9.6 acres (3.9 ha) of steeply sloping land south of St Helen's Church.

== Religion ==
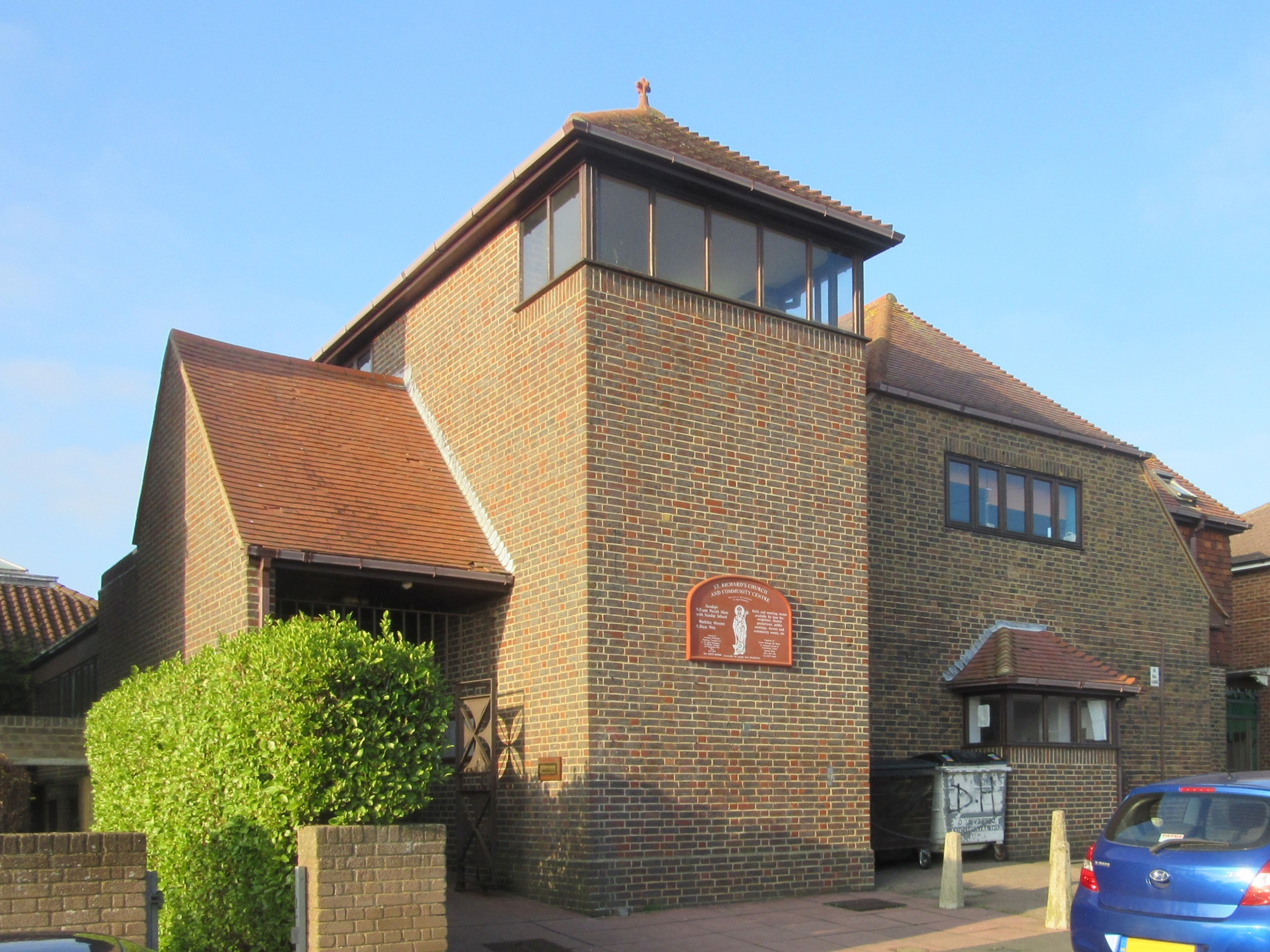
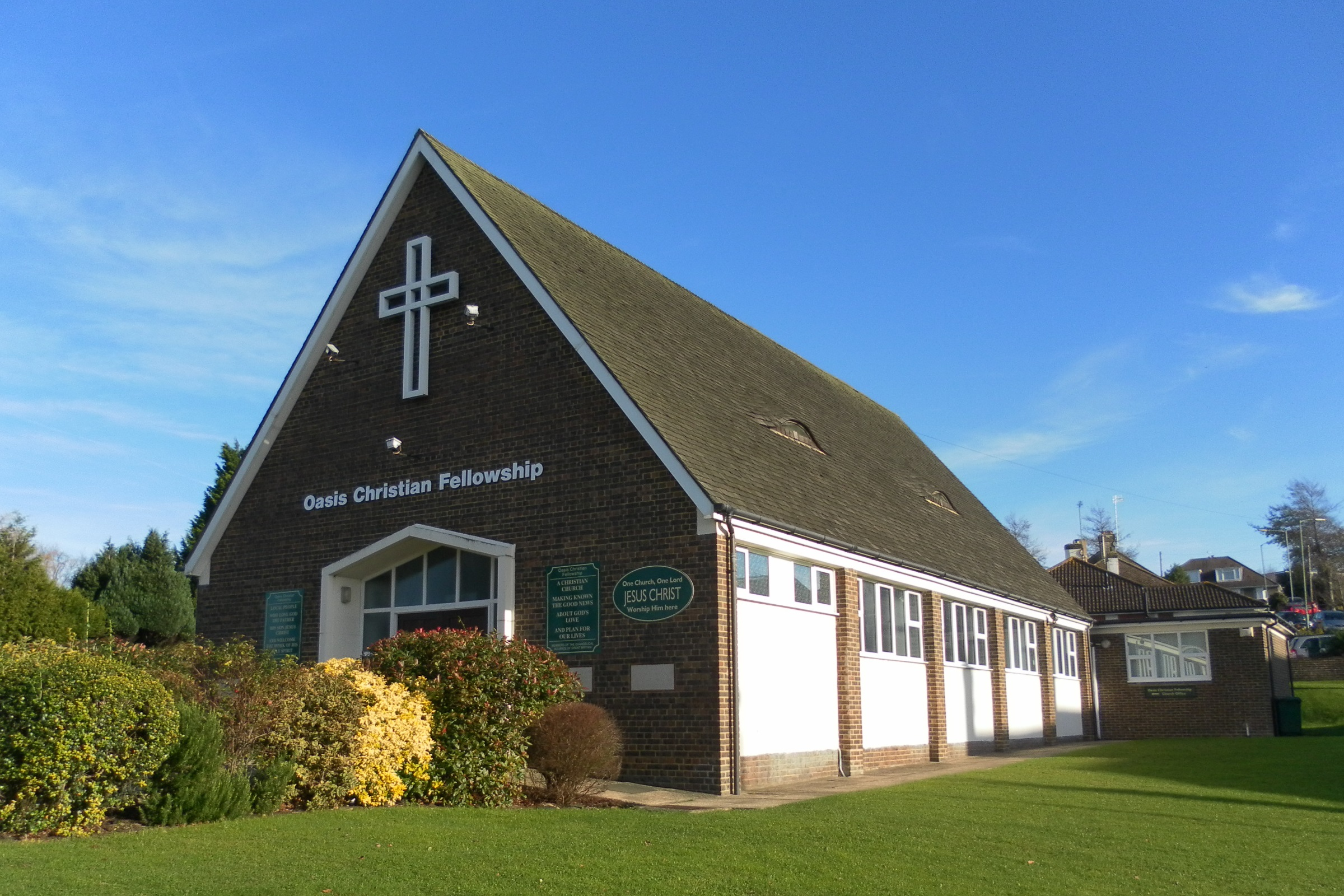
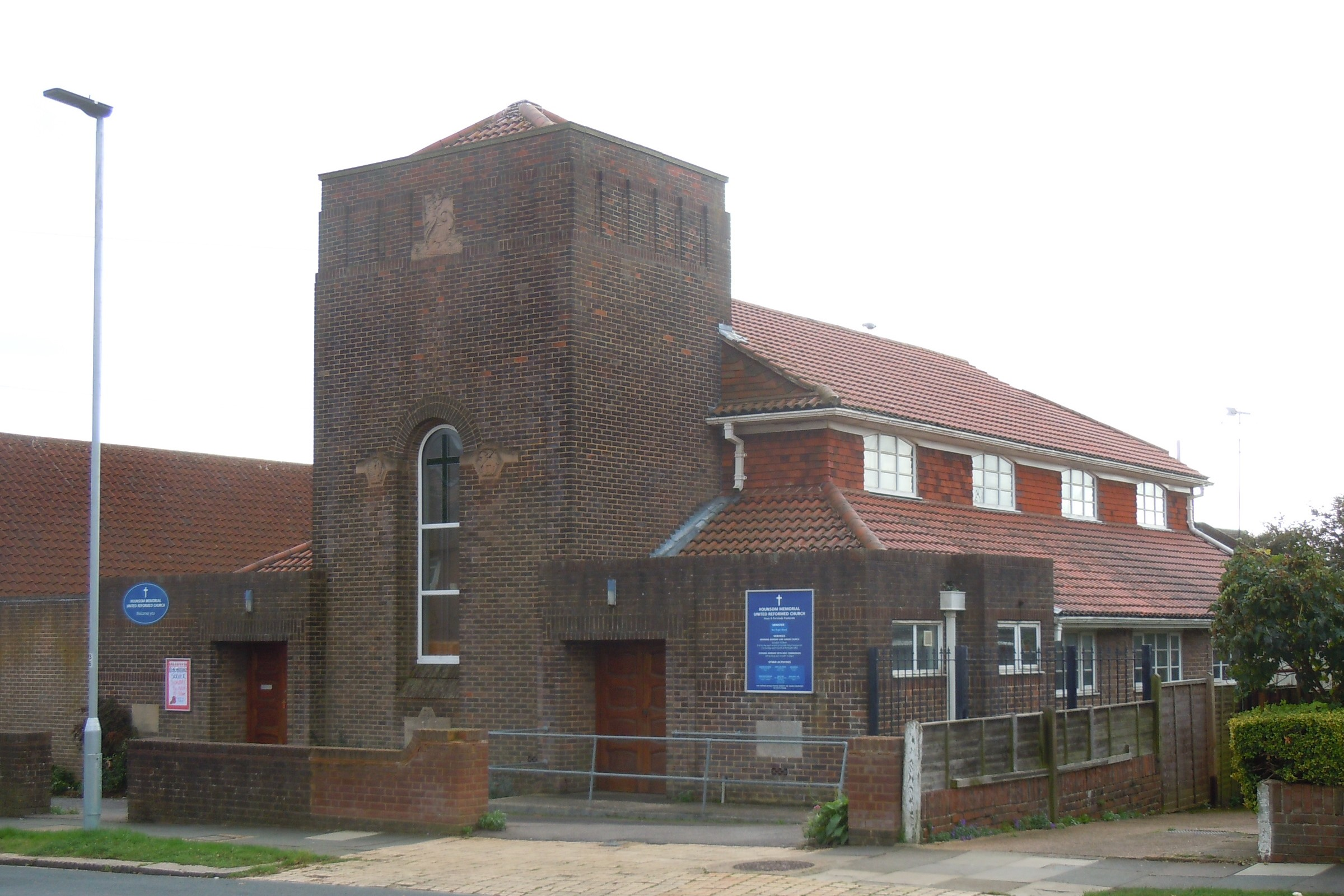
Left to right: St Richard's Church, Emmanuel Church (formerly Oasis Christian Fellowship) and Hounsom Memorial Church

St Helen's Church, the Church of England parish church, is a Grade I listed building. It is a simple flint building with dressings of Caen stone, originally with a thatched roof, and is similar to other downland churches in Sussex. Lord of the manor Richard Bellingham, who built Hangleton Manor, is commemorated by a memorial in the chancel. Situated in a "bleak and isolated spot", it only reopened fully in 1949 after a long period with infrequent services. It has been separately parished since 1955.

St Richard's Church, a brown-brick building designed by architects Carden and Godfrey, opened in 1961 to serve the southern part of Hangleton known as The Knoll. In the mid-1990s, it was converted into a combined church and community centre. Between 1932 and 1961, The Knoll had been served by a combined church and hall within the parish of St Leonard's Church, Aldrington. It became part of Hangleton parish in 1955.

The Hounsom Memorial United Reformed Church was built in 1938 to the design of Brighton architect John Leopold Denman. It was founded by the Sussex Congregational Union and Cliftonville Congregational Church in central Hove; Hangleton was identified as a good location for a new Congregational church because it was developing rapidly and no Nonconformist church had yet been provided.

The Baptist church on Hangleton Way was built in 1957 as Hangleton Free Church. It was founded by members of Holland Road Baptist Church in central Hove. Later names included The Vine Fellowship and Oasis Church; it is now called Emmanuel Church.

== Transport ==
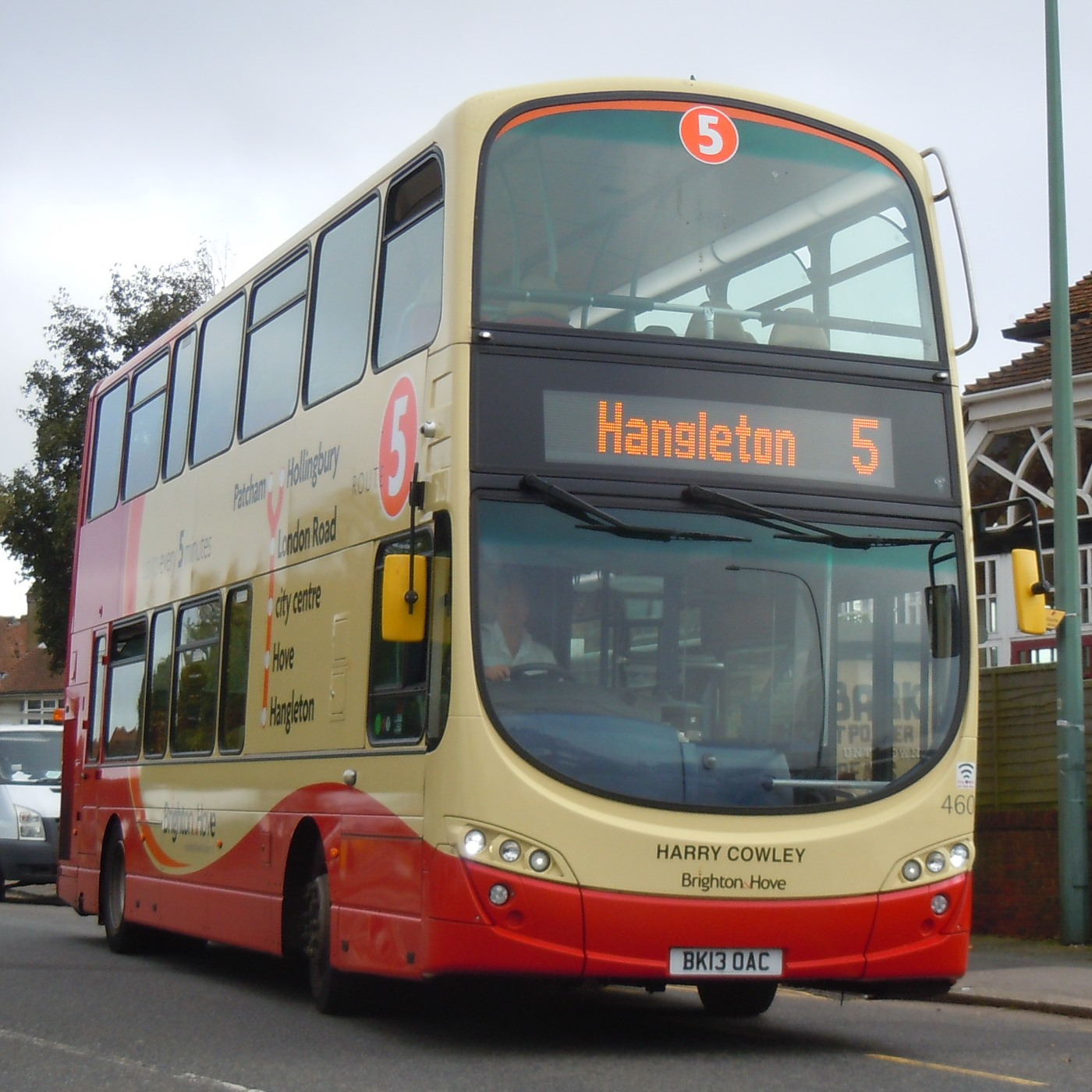
A bus outside the Grenadier pub at West Way

A bypass for Brighton and Hove, rerouting the A27 trunk road away from inner suburban areas, was first discussed in the 1920s, but the borough and county councils only voted in favour of one in 1980–81. A route looping tightly around the northern boundary of the urban area, including the Hangleton estate, was chosen. Various public inquiries were held, including one in 1987 about the need for a link road at the western edge of Hangleton, connecting the bypass and the old main road through Portslade. Construction started in 1989; the section north of Hangleton was built in 1990–92; and the whole route opened in April 1996. The Hangleton Link Road is designated the A293, and the junction with the bypass is called Hangleton Interchange.

The Brighton & Hove bus company operates regular services around the Hangleton estate on routes 5, 5A and 5B. Destinations include central Hove, central Brighton, Preston Park, Withdean, Patcham and Hollingbury. The central part of the Hangleton estate around the Grenadier pub is 12 minutes by bus from central Hove; outlying parts of Hangleton are about 25 minutes away. Another local bus company, The Big Lemon, operates route 16 between Hangleton, The Knoll, Portslade railway station, Portslade-by-Sea and the Sainsbury's supermarket at West Hove, and route 47 between Hangleton, The Knoll, Seven Dials, Brighton railway station, central Brighton, Kemptown, Brighton Marina, Ovingdean, Rottingdean and Saltdean.

The Brighton and Dyke Railway ran from a point west of Aldrington on the West Coastway line to Devil's Dyke on the South Downs between 1887 and 1938. It passed through Hangleton without stopping, although from 1934 a short-lived station called Rowan Halt was provided on Rowan Avenue beyond the south end of the estate. North of this, part of the trackbed survives as a footpath from Hangleton Way on to the Downs: the Dyke Railway Trail opened in July 1991 and can be used by horse riders, cyclists and walkers.

== See also ==
- List of places of worship in Brighton and Hove.
