= A Young Man Being Introduced to the Seven Liberal Arts =

Fresco painting by Sandro Botticelli

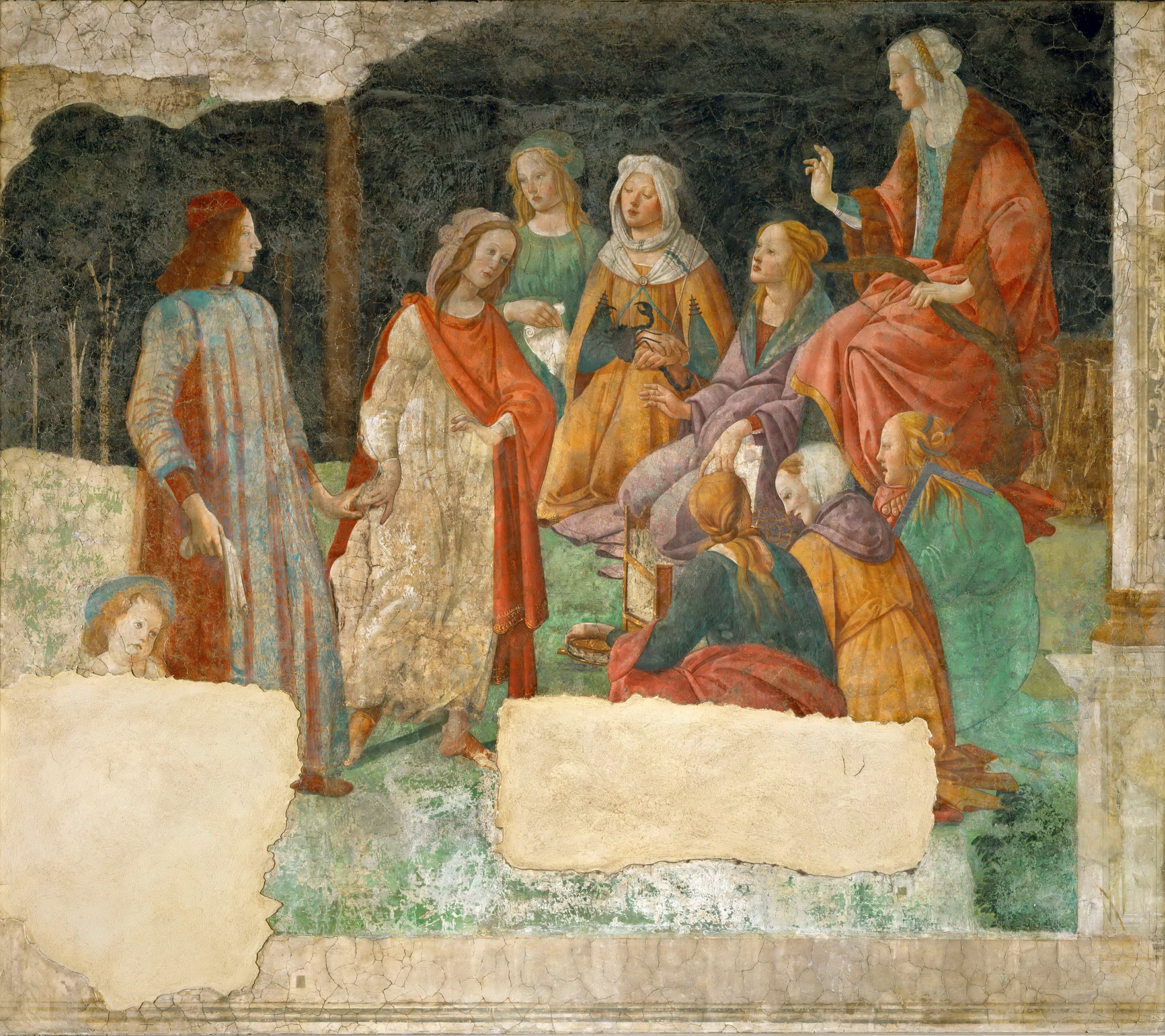
- Artist: Sandro Botticelli
- Year: 1483–1486
- Type: Fresco, detached and mounted on canvas
- Dimensions: 237 cm × 269 cm (93 in × 106 in)
- Location: Musée du Louvre; Paris

A Young Man Being Introduced to the Seven Liberal Arts, also known as Lorenzo Tornabuoni Presented by Grammar to Prudentia and the other Liberal Arts or Lorenzo Tornabuoni Being Introduced to the Liberal Arts (Italian: Giovane Introdotto tra le Arti Liberali), is a painting by the Italian Renaissance painter Sandro Botticelli, circa 1483–1486. The painting and its companion piece, Venus and the Three Graces Presenting Gifts to a Young Woman, originally decorated Villa Lemmi, a country villa near Florence owned by Giovanni Tornabuoni, uncle of Lorenzo de' Medici and head of the Roman branch of the Medici Bank. They were probably commissioned for the 1486 wedding of Giovanni's son Lorenzo to Giovanna of the Albizzi family, and are therefore thought to depict the two.

A Young Man Being Introduced to the Seven Liberal Arts depicts a young man, perhaps Lorenzo Tornabuoni, led by a personification of Grammar into a circle of allegorical figures representing the Seven Liberal Arts. Presided over by Prudentia, the circle also includes Rhetoric, Logic, Arithmetic, Geometry, Astronomy and Music, each recognizable by means of various attributes. In antiquity, the liberal arts denoted the education worthy of a free person and the painting therefore testifies to the young man's broad education. The figure of Arithmetic is seen holding its hand out in greeting to the young man. Tornabuoni, a scion to a banking family, would have probably had an education focused on numbers.

Both paintings were discovered at Villa Lemmi in 1873 under a coat of whitewash and removed from their original location. They are now in the Musée du Louvre, Paris.

== See also ==
- List of works by Sandro Botticelli
