= Venus and the Three Graces Presenting Gifts to a Young Woman =

Fresco painting by Sandro Botticelli

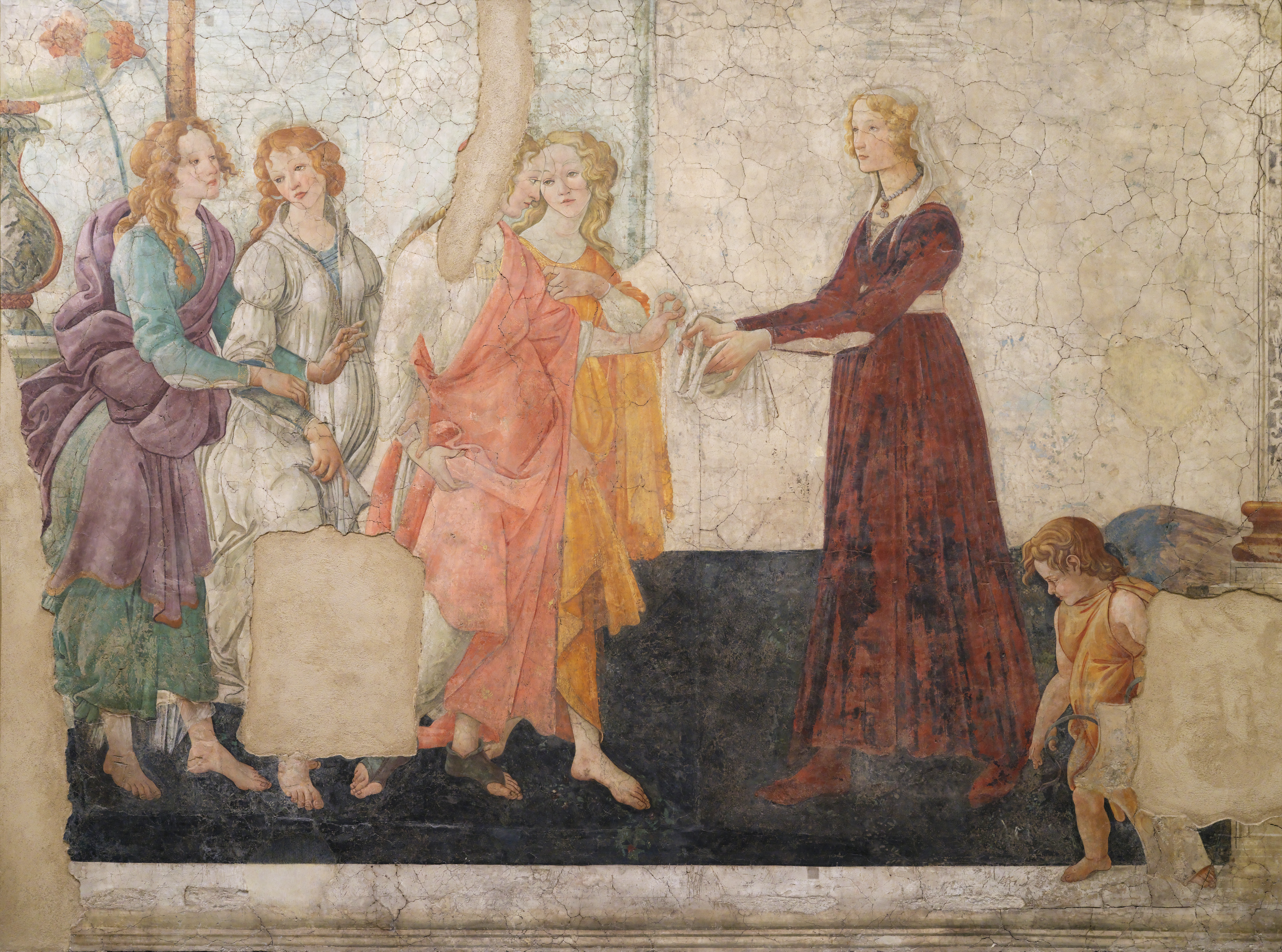
- Artist: Sandro Botticelli
- Year: 1483–1486
- Type: Fresco, detached and mounted on canvas
- Dimensions: 211 cm × 283 cm (83 in × 111 in)
- Location: Musée du Louvre, Louvres

Venus and the Three Graces Presenting Gifts to a Young Woman, also known as Gioo degli Albizzi Receiving a Gift of Flowers from Venus (Italian: Venere e le tre Grazie offrono doni a una giovane), is a fresco painting by the Italian Renaissance painter Sandro Botticelli of circa 1483–1486. The painting and its companion piece, A Young Man Being Introduced to the Seven Liberal Arts, originally decorated the walls of Villa Lemmi, a country villa near Florence owned by Giovanni Tornabuoni, uncle of Lorenzo de' Medici and head of the Roman branch of the Medici Bank. They were probably commissioned for the wedding in 1486 of Giovanni's son Lorenzo to Giovanna of the Albizzi family, and are therefore thought to depict the two.

Venus and the Three Graces Presenting Gifts to a Young Woman shows a young woman, probably Giovanna Tornabuoni, being received by Venus and the three Graces. Giovanna holds open a white cloth, into which Venus is laying roses symbolizing beauty and love.

Both paintings were discovered at Villa Lemmi in 1873 under a coat of whitewash and removed from the wall and transferred to a canvas support. They are now in the Musée du Louvre, Paris.

== See also ==
- List of works by Sandro Botticelli
