= St Helen's Church, Hangleton =

St Helen's Church
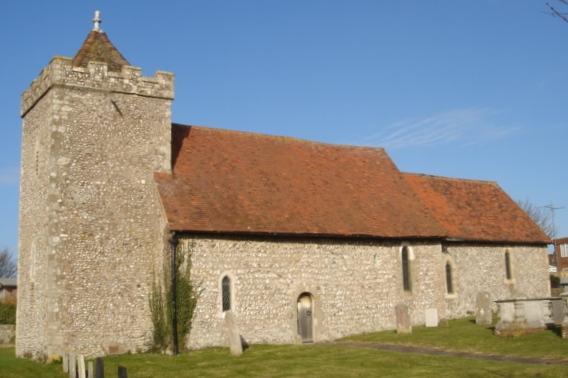
- The church from the southwest

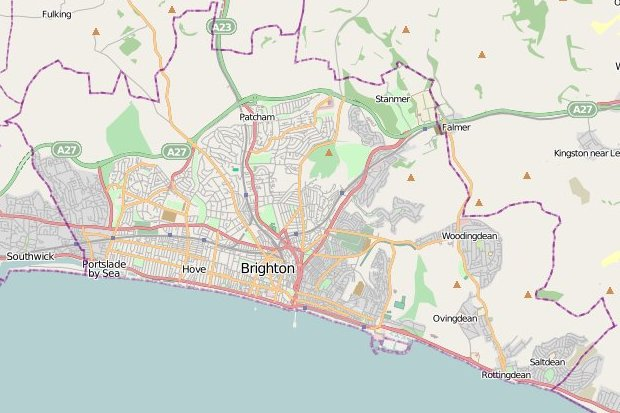
- Location of St Helen's within Brighton and Hove
- 50.8511°N 0.2009°W
- Denomination: Church of England

History
- Dedication: St Helen

Administration
- Province: Canterbury
- Diocese: Chichester
- Archdeaconry: Chichester
- Deanery: Rural Deanery of Hove
- Parish: Hangleton, St Helen

St Helen's Church, an Anglican church in the Hangleton area of Hove, is the oldest surviving building in the English city of Brighton and Hove. It is the ancient parish church of Hangleton, an isolated South Downs village that was abandoned by the Middle Ages and was open farmland until the Interwar Period, when extensive residential development took place.

== History ==
Hangleton existed at the time of the Domesday Book of 1086, although the church was not mentioned; its first known reference is in 1093 when William de Warenne, 2nd Earl of Surrey put it under the control of Lewes Priory. The church stood between the manor house and the cottages and houses of the village to the northeast, and was a rectangular building 62 feet (19 m) long and 17.5 feet (5 m), with flint walls 3.5 feet (1 m) thick. Rebuilding began in the 12th century. The nave dates from that century, while the square tower was added in the 13th century and the church was re-roofed at that time (having originally been thatched). The 12th-century chancel was rebuilt in around 1300.

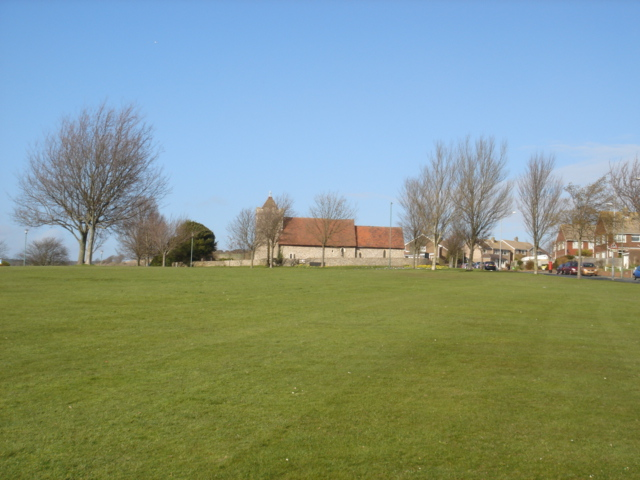
There is still a stretch of open downland to the south of the church, although residential development surrounds it on other sides. Before the plague in the 17th century there a small lake at the top of the green (St. Helen's Green) but it was used as a 'plague pit' – meaning a mass grave – used to dispose of the victims of The Black Death.

Hangleton village began to decline in the 14th century. The whole parish, which covered a much wider area than the village itself, had a population of 80 by around 1850. In 1864 it was formally united with the parish of Portslade, having already been administered by Portslade's vicar for the previous 100 years. The condition of the church building worsened, but it never became an unusable ruin and never experienced a period without services—although for a time these were as infrequent as once a year. The churchyard was still used for burials as well.

Unlike many other mediaeval churches in the Brighton and Hove area, which were heavily restored and altered in the 19th century, St Helen's was largely overlooked because of its isolation in a bleak, distant spot high on the South Downs above Hove. In 1870, George Cokayne, later a Clarenceux King of Arms, funded a minor restoration of the church. This may have saved the building from ruin, but also preserved its ancient character.

Scenes for the 1909 film The Boy and the Convict, directed by Dave Aylott for James Williamson' Williamson Kinematograph Company, were filmed in the churchyard.

The parish was incorporated into the then Borough of Hove in 1927. The Borough started to use the expanse of open land for housing development soon afterwards. This spread northwestwards from Hove in the mid-1930s and continued until the 1950s, by which time the whole area around the church had been built up. Another partial restoration took place in 1929, followed by a more thorough rebuilding in 1949. This added a porch and a vestry, a new roof (at a cost of £2,500) and some battlements and a pyramidal roof on the tower. Work continued until 1951, at which time the parish was split from Portslade. The new Parish of Hangleton's first priest took over in 1955.

Following the 1949 alterations, St Helen's was reopened for regular use, and was granted Grade II* listed status on 24 March 1950.

== Architecture ==
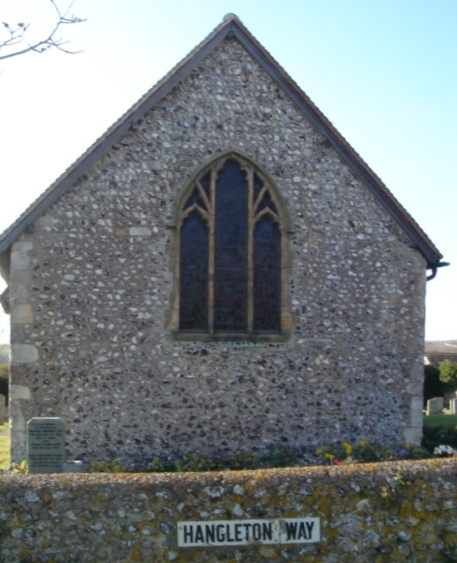
The triple-headed lancet window in the east face

The church is built of flint—a stone used for many churches in the Downs in Sussex. The doors, windows and quoins are faced with Caen stone, which was used frequently in Norman buildings. The flints in the south wall are laid in a herringbone (opus spicatum) pattern, a style favoured during the Saxon period; the church has been identified by some sources as one of the best surviving examples of herringboning from that era. The roof is now tiled in clay. The basic structural layout—chancel, nave of three bays and west tower—has not changed since the 13th century, although the original chancel arch was removed in the 14th century and the porch and vestry on the northern side are 20th-century additions.

There are lancet windows of various sizes in all four faces of the church. The west front has two, there is a large three-pointed window in the east face, and several tiny windows are placed at irregular intervals in the south and north walls. In particular, there is a low window into the chancel whose function has been much speculated on. One theory is that it was used by mediaeval lepers who would stand outside and listen to services through the window rather than enter the church itself. It may also have served as a type of confessional, allowing a priest to sit inside the church and the penitent to stay outside.

During the restorations of 1949, ancient wall paintings were discovered on the north wall of the church, along with some scrollwork on one of the windows. The scrollwork was found to date from the early 13th century, while the wall paintings were 14th- and 15th-century in origin. Some restoration of this work was carried out in 1969, at which time some blocked-up windows in the nave were rediscovered.

In one corner of the chancel, there is a memorial monument which has been identified as representing the Bellingham family, who lived in the area in the 16th and 17th century. Richard and Mary Bellingham, nine children and five coffins representing children who died soon after birth are depicted. Elsewhere, an early-20th-century stone pietà commemorates a local brewer and pottery collector, and a carved wooden screen and reredos in the chancel was also donated as a memorial. The pulpit, however, was taken from St Leonard's Church, Aldrington.

== Burials ==
Clergyman and social reformer Samuel Augustus Barnett, founder of Toynbee Hall in London, and his wife Henrietta Barnett, who conceived and helped to create Hampstead Garden Suburb, are buried in the churchyard to the north of the church.

Edward Vaughan Hyde Kenealy QC, who lived in Portslade from the 1850s until 1874, was a barrister who unsuccessfully defended Sir Roger Tichborne in the Tichborne Case, a famous 19th-century trial: it was the longest in British legal history at the time, partly because of Kenealy's erratic, inappropriate behaviour. He was disbarred soon afterwards, but became Member of Parliament for Stoke-on-Trent until shortly before his death in 1880. He is buried in a grave by the south door of the church, marked by an ostentatious black marble tombstone with gold mosaic work.

Henry Willett (1823–1905), a wealthy Brighton brewer, and noted collector of ceramics, paintings and fossils was buried here. He was one of the founders of Brighton Museum.

Inside the church there are inlaid tombstones.

== The church today ==
St Helen's Church was listed at Grade II* on 24 March 1950. As of February 2001, it was one of 70 Grade II*-listed buildings and structures, and 1,218 listed buildings of all grades, in the city of Brighton and Hove.

== See also ==
- List of places of worship in Brighton and Hove
