= Henry Willett =

Henry Willett (1823–1905) was a wealthy Brighton brewer, and noted collector of ceramics, paintings and fossils. He supported numerous charities and was one of the founders of Brighton Museum. He was an admirer and acquaintance of John Ruskin.

Willett was the son of William Catt (1776–1853), a farmer and miller who owned and managed the tide mill near Bishopstone. He was raised by his eldest sister Elizabeth Willett Catt (1797–1863) after the death of his mother; he adopted the surname Willett under the terms of his sister's will.

He died at his home, Arnold House, Brighton, Sussex on 24 February 1905 and was buried at St Helen's Church, Hangleton.

Willett presented his collection of ceramics and paintings to Brighton Museum in 1903. The collection focused on ceramics which, through their decorative subject matter, illustrated the political, social, and cultural history of Britain.
