= Henry Michell Wagner =

British priest (1792–1870)

Reverend Henry Michell Wagner
- Born: 16 November 1792; London
- Died: 7 October 1870 (aged 77); Brighton, East Sussex
- Resting place: Woodvale Cemetery, Brighton; 50.835°N 0.115°W
- Education: King's College, Cambridge (1812–15)
- Occupation: Clergyman
- Years active: 1824–1870
- Known for: Tutor to Arthur Wellesley, 2nd Duke of Wellington and Lord Charles Wellesley; Vicar of Brighton
- Spouse: Elizabeth Harriott
- Children: Arthur Wagner

Henry Michell Wagner (1792–1870) was a Church of England clergyman who was Vicar of Brighton between 1824 and 1870. He was a descendant of Melchior Wagner, hatmaker to the Royal Family, and married into a wealthy Sussex family who had a longstanding ecclesiastical connection with Brighton. Wagner paid for and oversaw the building of five churches in the rapidly growing seaside resort, and "dominated religious life in the town" with his forceful personality and sometimes controversial views and actions. His son Arthur Wagner (1824–1902) continued the family's close association with Brighton.

Wagner tutored the Duke of Wellington's sons for several years, and the Duke was responsible for appointing Wagner to the position of Vicar of Brighton—a role fulfilled by his grandfather Henry Michell in the 18th century. "This appointment was to have very considerable implications for the Anglican Church in Brighton" for the next century, as Wagner (and, later, his son) built new churches, founded and endowed charitable causes, imposed their strong characters on the town and became embroiled in regular disputes and controversies. The "Purchas affair", involving one of Wagner's curates and a proprietary chapel, was "the most extraordinary event" in Brighton's Victorian-era religious history and was reported nationally.

== Early life ==
Henry Michell Wagner was born on 16 November 1792 at 93 Pall Mall, London. His baptism took place on 15 December of that year at St James's Church, Piccadilly. He was the youngest of four children of Melchior Henry Wagner and Anne Elizabeth Michell. Melchior Henry Wagner was the grandson of Melchior Wagner, born in 1685 in Coburg, who moved to London, was naturalised in 1709 and became hatmaker to King George I in 1717. Anne Elizabeth Michell was the daughter of Rev. Henry Michell, who was Vicar of Brighton until his death in 1789. The Michells were a dynasty of wealthy yeomen from the West Sussex village of Shipley, and Rev. Henry Michell was a wealthy and influential figure in Brighton during the 18th century, when the town was growing in popularity and status. The Gentleman's Magazine (Note: From volume LXIX, p. 1055, quoted in Wagner & Dale (1983), p. 14.) commented that "the most distinguished personages that visited [Brighton] courted his acquaintance".

Henry Michell Wagner went to Eton College in 1805, attained King's Scholar status in 1808 and left for King's College, Cambridge in 1812, where he read classics. From 1815 until 1824 he was a fellow of the college. He attended his graduation ceremony in July 1819.

Starting in 1814, he combined his studies with extensive travelling in Europe, particularly with the aim of learning languages. A visit to France, Belgium and the Netherlands in 1814 nearly ended in disaster when the boat he was on capsized. He suffered another bad experience during his first ever visit to his future home town, Brighton, in February 1816. An armed robber accosted him in a twitten (Note: Sussex dialect for a narrow alleyway between buildings or walls.) near Pool Valley and shot at his head when he refused to give up his money. Wagner put his hand in front of his face, which saved his life: the bullet lodged in the bone, causing an injury which took months to heal. Nevertheless, in March 1816 he started his version of the Grand Tour with a boat trip to Dieppe, from where he travelled to places such as Fontainebleau, Geneva, Milan, Florence, Rome and Messina.

Wagner was recalled from his tour in the autumn of 1817 to become tutor to the sons of the Duke of Wellington. The duke's brother the Marquis of Wellesley had asked the advice of his schoolfriend Joseph Goodall, Provost of Eton, and Goodall suggested Wagner. The Duke "seems to have accepted the recommendation without further enquiry", and Wagner returned to Brighton via Dieppe and travelled to Eton to meet Goodall. He was then sent back to France to meet the Duke, who was staying at Cambrai. His interview was successful, and after another visit to Paris Wagner returned to England to meet the Duke's sons—the ten-year-old Marquess of Douro and Lord Charles Wellesley, who was a year younger. In 1820, he took on a third pupil. Gerald Wellesley, 11-year-old son of the Duke's brother Henry Wellesley, 1st Baron Cowley and his estranged wife Lady Charlotte Cadogan. He had been adopted by the Duchess of Wellington and lived with the rest of the family at Stratfield Saye House in Hampshire. Wagner lived there as well until the boys went to Eton College, at which time he took a house there. He was "for the most part satisfied" with the ability and behaviour of his pupils, and remained in contact with them until 1827 or later.

== Ordination ==
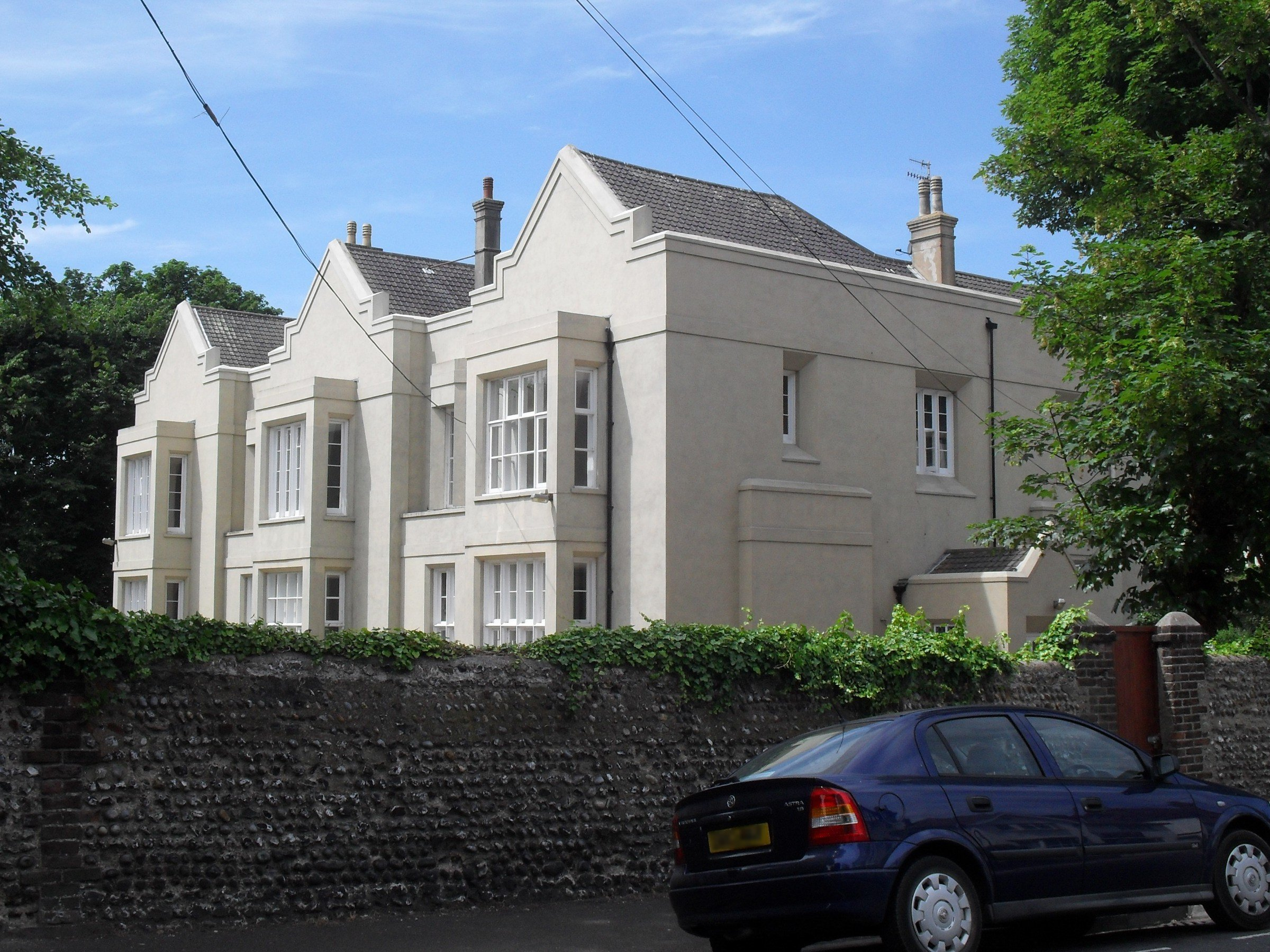
A new vicarage was built for Wagner in 1835.

Soon after meeting his future wife Elizabeth, Wagner was ordained as a deacon in the Church of England. He undertook preparation with his uncle Rev. John Henry Michell, rector of St Andrew's Church, Buckland, Hertfordshire, during September and October 1821. His ordination ceremony took place at Ely Cathedral on 28 October 1821 and was undertaken by the Bishop of Ely Bowyer Sparke, who knew his mother. The following Sunday, at St Andrew's Church, Clewer (near his Eton home), he conducted his first service.

Soon afterwards, Dr Robert James Carr became Bishop of Chichester and the position of Vicar of Brighton became vacant. Normally, the living would be presented by the Bishop, but on this occasion the responsibility passed to The Crown. The Duke of Wellington had the authority to present the living to a priest of his choice, and on 12 May 1824 he offered it to Wagner. "His choice of this living ... showed that he was most anxious to be of service to his protégé": Wagner would have had an emotional connection to Brighton because his grandfather had served forty-five years as Vicar of Brighton. Wagner accepted the position, and immediately asked for the Bishop of Ely to ordain him as a priest so he could take up the position (as he was still only a deacon). The ceremony took place on 16 May 1824 at St James's Church, Piccadilly. He took up the living on 30 July of that year, and on 1 August 1824 he took his first services at St Nicholas' Church, Brighton's parish church. At the time, the vicarage was a medieval house in The Lanes which had been rebuilt for Wagner's grandfather Rev. Henry Michell in 1790. Henry Michell Wagner occupied it until 1835, when the firm of Cheesman & Son designed and built a new vicarage in the Montpelier district. (Note: The building still exists, but is part of Brighton and Hove High School. The "austere Neo-Tudor" building, set back from the road, is Grade II-listed.)

Wagner was appointed Treasurer of the Chichester Cathedral in April 1834. The position had been created in the 12th century by Bishop Hilary and came with its own house on the cathedral close near the Bishop's Palace. Wagner had the house demolished and a replacement built on its site.

== Early years as Vicar of Brighton ==
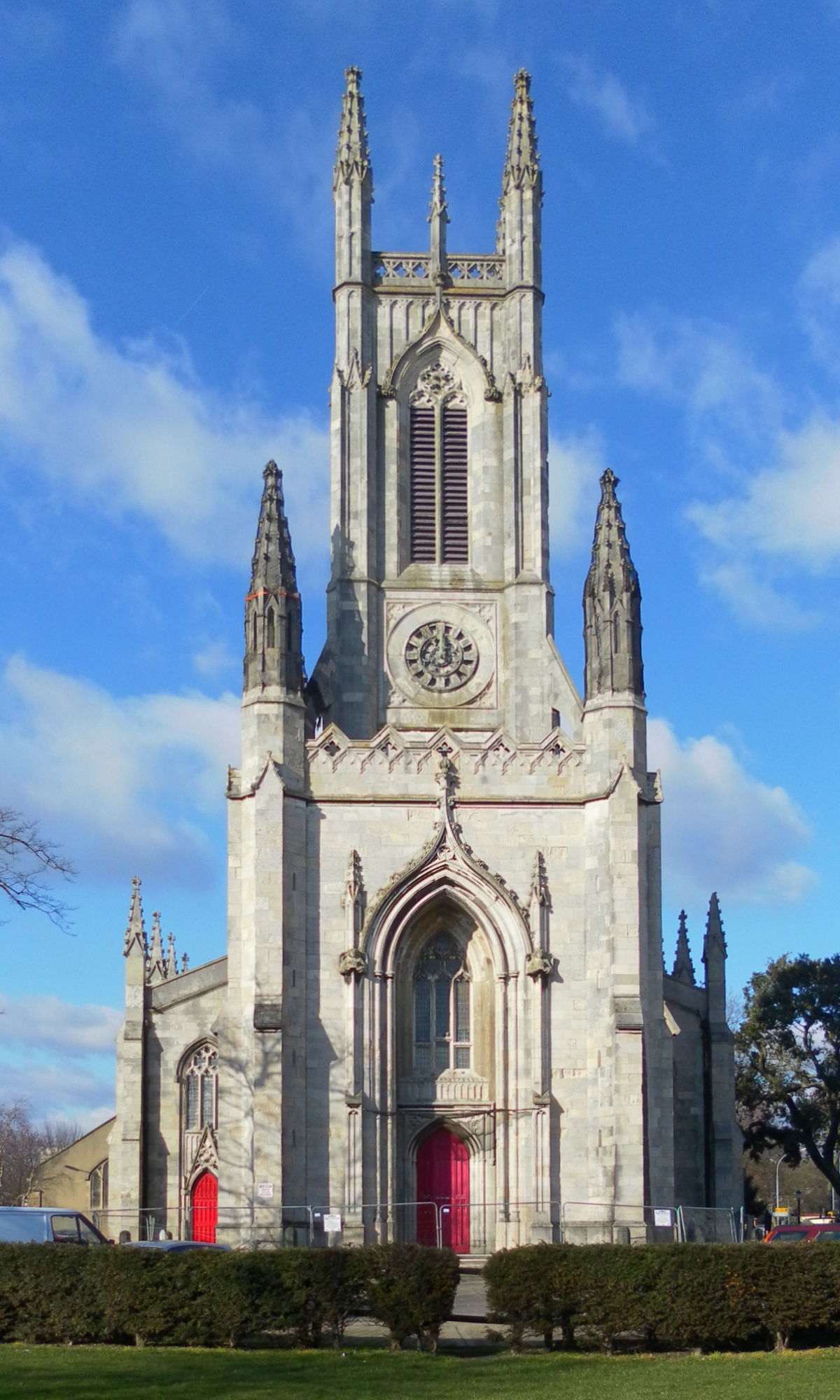
One of Wagner's first tasks as Vicar of Brighton was to oversee construction of St Peter's Church.

Wagner was now in ecclesiastical control of a town which was growing rapidly (Note: Brighton's population grew more in the 1820s than in any other decade of the 19th century.) but which had only three public places of Anglican worship: St Nicholas' Church, the Chapel Royal (1795) near the Royal Pavilion, and St James's Chapel east of the town centre (1810–13). Nonconformist places of worship, meanwhile, were numerous: Brighton Friends Meeting House, Brighton Unitarian Church, Dorset Gardens Methodist Church, Union Chapel and chapels for Particular Baptists and the Countess of Huntingdon's Connexion all existed by 1824, as did a Roman Catholic church and a synagogue. Several churches were being built or were planned to provide more capacity—but Wagner soon became embroiled in conflicts with some of the people involved.

St Margaret's Chapel was built in 1824 to serve the fashionable Regency Square. Founded solely as a property speculation, it was paid for by Barnard Gregory—a man who would have "upset a much less difficult character than Wagner". His activities included banking, acting and journalism, and he owned several newspapers including one so scandalous that he was regularly sued and jailed. Wagner was involved in lengthy and tiresome correspondence over Gregory's choice of perpetual curate for the church, Edward Everard (one of the curates of St Nicholas' Church). Wagner refused to permit his appointment—he had a right of veto—and eventually the Bishop of Chichester had to get involved. Wagner did eventually allow Everard to be appointed, but he bought the right to the patronage from Gregory for £500 so that the appointment of curates to the church was formally under his (Wagner's) control.

Within three years, three more Anglican churches—all proprietary chapels—had been opened in Brighton. St George's Church near the Kemp Town estate was sponsored by the estate's developer Thomas Read Kemp and opened on 1 January 1826. Rev. J.S.M. Anderson, a friend of Wagner's, became its Perpetual curate in 1829. Holy Trinity Church in The Lanes was built in 1817 for Kemp when he briefly seceded from the Church of England to form his own sect; he returned to Anglicanism in 1823 and the church was reconsecrated for Anglican worship after an act of parliament in 1826, which also dealt with the status within the parish of St James's Chapel. Next came St Mary's Church on the road between St James's and St George's. Barnard Gregory had the authority to build a proprietary chapel there, but in 1826 he sold the site to furniture firm proprietor Charles Elliott. He asked Wagner's permission to build a church there for his son, Rev. Henry Venn Elliott, who was about to be ordained. Amon Henry Wilds designed the church in the Classical style, (Note: It was rebuilt by William Emerson in French Gothic Revival style in 1877–79.) and it opened for worship in 1827.

From 1824, Wagner oversaw the design and building of St Peter's Church, a landmark chapel of ease "at the entrance to the town". Its construction had been sanctioned in 1818, and the Commissioners for Building New Churches had lent £15,000 interest-free. In Wagner's first year as Vicar of Brighton, the competition to select an architect was held, Charles Barry was selected, and the church was founded in 1824 and opened in 1828. "The building of St Peter's proved to be a stormy passage for all concerned". Amon Henry Wilds and Charles Busby had been favourites to design the church but were runners-up in the competition. Also, the work ended up costing more than £20,000 instead of Barry's estimated £14,700. Wagner had difficult work to do in balancing the demands for more money with efforts to keep the debt down. There were disputes with the Vestry; (Note: i.e. the "administrative Vestry"—the lay members of a church elected to deal with its financial and administrative operation.) and pew rental—a practice Wagner was opposed to, and which caused him much trouble throughout his time in Brighton—then became an issue. The Vestry demanded a lower proportion of free pews to bring in more income and reduce the building debt more quickly; Wagner, who authorised 1,100 free pews in the 1,800-capacity church, opposed this. The Commissioners for Building New Churches eventually agreed to change the balance to 900 free and 900 rented pews. Problems also arose over the internal fittings, the illuminated clock tower and Charles Barry's insistence on retaining the architectural plan.

Wagner was connected with a curious incident in 1837 which "so upset the Duchess of St Albans that she vowed she would never set foot in Brighton again". An unknown blackmailer sent an anonymous letter to her husband William Beauclerk, 9th Duke of St Albans, fraudulently using the name of a prominent firm of Brighton solicitors and claiming to have been written on behalf of Wagner and Thomas Read Kemp. Kemp, a friend of the Duke and Duchess, knew nothing of the letter, and Wagner and the solicitors confirmed it was a forgery. The mystery was never solved, but it was apparently connected with an incident where the Duke went hunting with hawks at Devil's Dyke and forced a farmer to move his sheep elsewhere.

== Wagner's churches ==
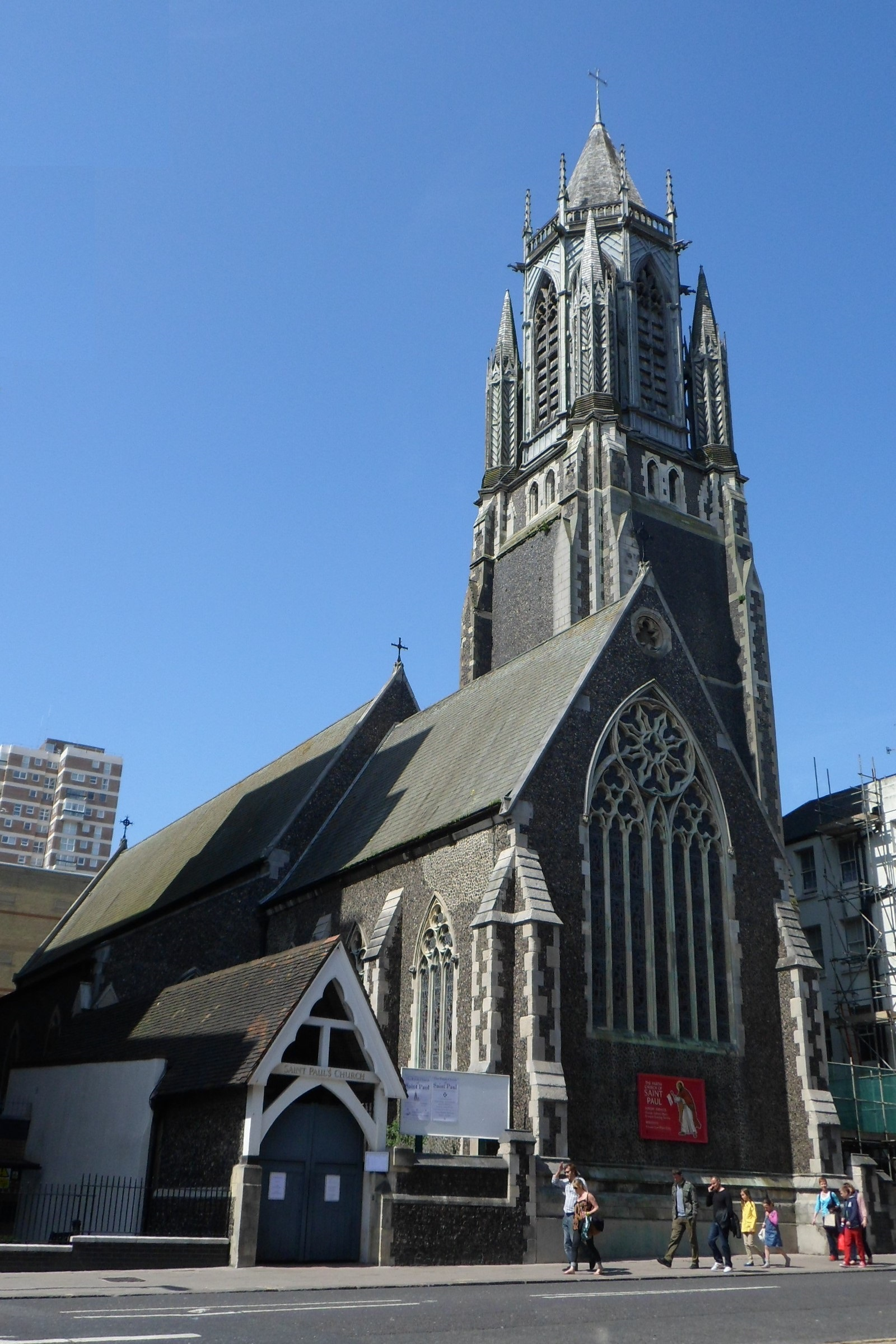
Wagner built St Paul's Church in central Brighton for his son Arthur.

The Anglican cause grew strongly under Henry Michell Wagner's guidance as Vicar of Brighton. By 1866, there were 27 churches in the town, compared to 14 in 1841, and Wagner himself had founded six of them. Of the six only St Paul's Church, which he built for his son Arthur, remains in Anglican use though; one other is now used by the Greek Orthodox community and the others have been demolished. Although several churches had been built in the 1820s and 1830s, large areas of the town still had inadequate provision for worship: northern and eastern areas, which were the poorest areas, were particularly badly served. Wagner's "major campaign of church-building" aimed to address this deficiency.

Wagner's first church served Brighton's largest area of poor housing—the district around Eastern Road now known as Kemptown. All Souls Church was founded on 29 July 1833—Wagner himself laid the first stone—and opened on 4 April 1834. Its cost of £3,082.10s.8d. was met mostly by the clergy of other local churches (£1,000) and the Society for the Building and Enlargement of Churches (£500). Wagner contributed £150, and many of his relatives assisted as well. "Money did not run to architectural embellishments" on the starkly plain building; there was a rudimentary Classical façade facing north, and all other elevations were hidden. The interior had Gothic Revival features and was old-fashioned for the date, resembling an 18th-century "preaching house". The church became redundant in 1968 and was demolished that year during work to widen Eastern Road.

Soon afterwards, Wagner founded Christ Church in the south of the developing residential area of Montpelier. It was a higher-class district, and more money was spent on the building; it was designed by prolific church architect George Cheesman, Jr. in the Early English Gothic Revival style, and there was a tower with a spire. It was built in 1837–38 and opened on 26 April 1838. Of the £4,600 cost, the Commissioners for Building New Churches and the Society for the Building and Enlargement of Churches gave £500 each, £50 each came from King William IV, Queen Adelaide and (after her accession) Queen Victoria, Wagner gave £200 and separately paid for the stained glass and the vaults under the church, and other members of the Wagner family gave £420 between them. The church survived until 1982, when it was demolished following fire damage in 1978.

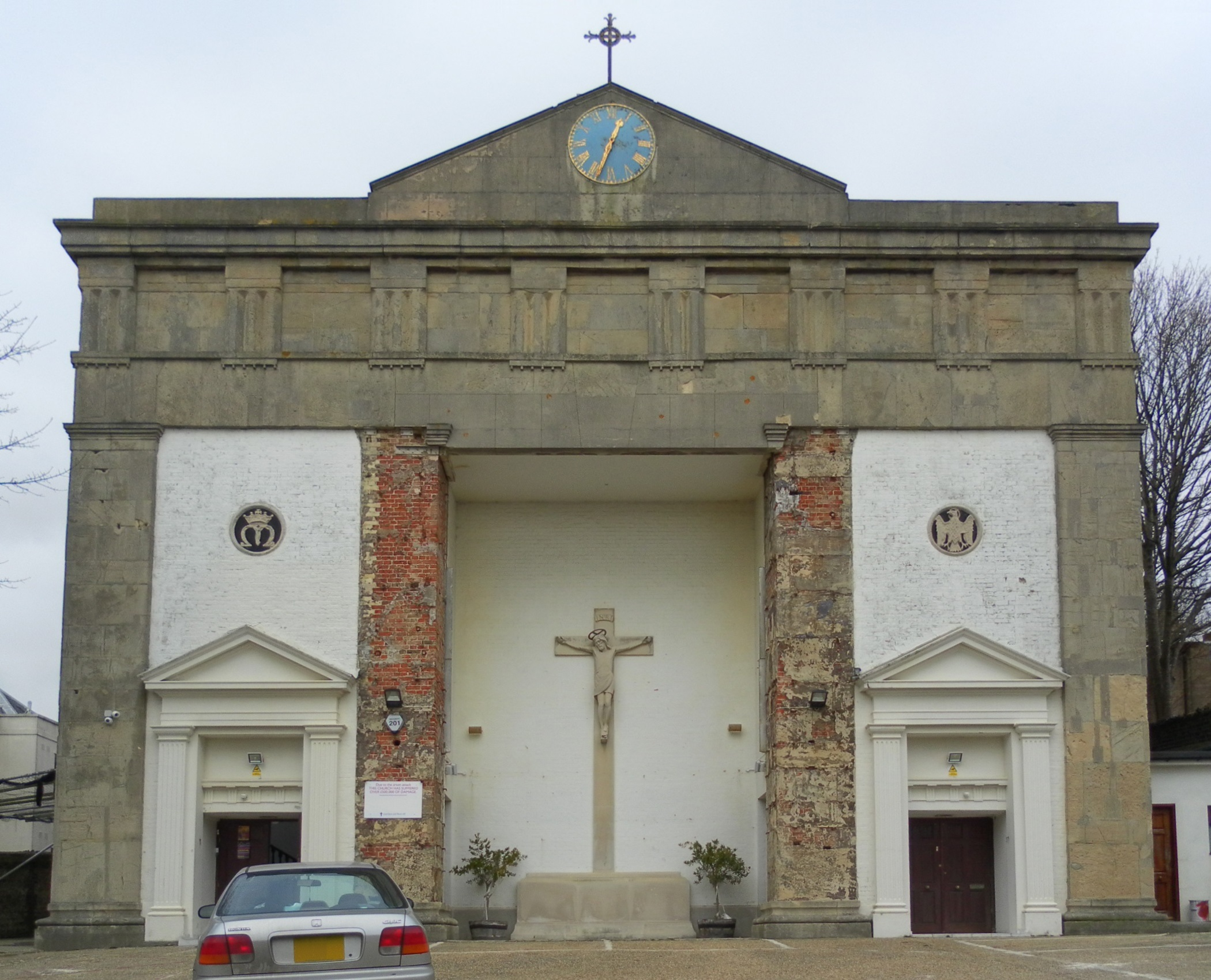
St John the Evangelist's Church (now the Greek Orthodox Church of the Holy Trinity) served the Carlton Hill district.

The third of Wagner's churches served Brighton's poorest slum district, Carlton Hill. George Cheesman junior was again commissioned to design the church, which was dedicated to St John the Evangelist. A plain and "strangely bleak" Classical exterior, dominated by Doric pilasters, led to an "elegant" galleried interior. The area was so impoverished that Wagner arranged for an endowment fund to be set up, as its worshippers would not be able to support the church financially. This raised nearly £3,000. Construction cost £5,212.7s.11d., and the church opened for worship on 28 January 1840. Wagner and his family contributed much towards it: he gave £200 himself, his wife and father-in-law donated £118.10s. and £265 respectively, and his mother, sister and brother George gave £60 between them. Other donors included Queen Victoria (£50), Member of Parliament for Brighton Adolphus Dalrymple (£25) and local landowner Frederick Hervey, 1st Marquess of Bristol (£100). The Commissioners for Building New Churches and the Society for the Building and Enlargement of Churches gave £1,500 between them as well. St John the Evangelist's Church closed in 1980 and was sold to the Greek Orthodox community in 1985, for whom it now serves as the Greek Orthodox Church of the Holy Trinity.

St Paul's Church on West Street in central Brighton was Wagner's fourth church. It was built specifically for the ministry of his son Arthur, whose ordination was imminent at the time. Construction took place between 1846 and 1848, the church opened on 18 October 1848 and its consecration ceremony took place on 12 October 1849. Three months later, Arthur Wagner became its perpetual curate. "The first of the great Gothic [Revival] churches" in Brighton, St Paul's cost £12,000 and was designed by Richard Cromwell Carpenter, whose Tractarian "High Church" views on ecclesiastical architecture and ecclesiology met with Arthur Wagner's approval. As before, part of the cost of the church was met by members of Henry Michell Wagner's family, and he donated £1,475 himself. St Paul's was built near several other centrally located Anglican churches, particularly St Nicholas', the Chapel Royal and Holy Trinity, but it remains in use as an Anglican place of worship. Architecturally and historically, it is "one of the great churches of Victorian Brighton".

Wagner's fifth church was more modest; it "attracted little attention during ... its existence". All Saints Church stood on Compton Avenue in the West Hill area near Brighton railway station. Richard Cromwell Carpenter was again commissioned to design it, and like St Paul's Church it was a flint-built Gothic Revival structure (this time in the Decorated Gothic style); but there was no tower or spire, and only the "beautiful woodwork" of the interior gave it any architectural interest. All Saints opened in 1852 and was paid for by various contributors including the Society for the Building and Enlargement of Churches and Henry Michell Wagner himself, who gave £300. It was damaged by bombs in World War II and was demolished in 1957, but its church hall survives.

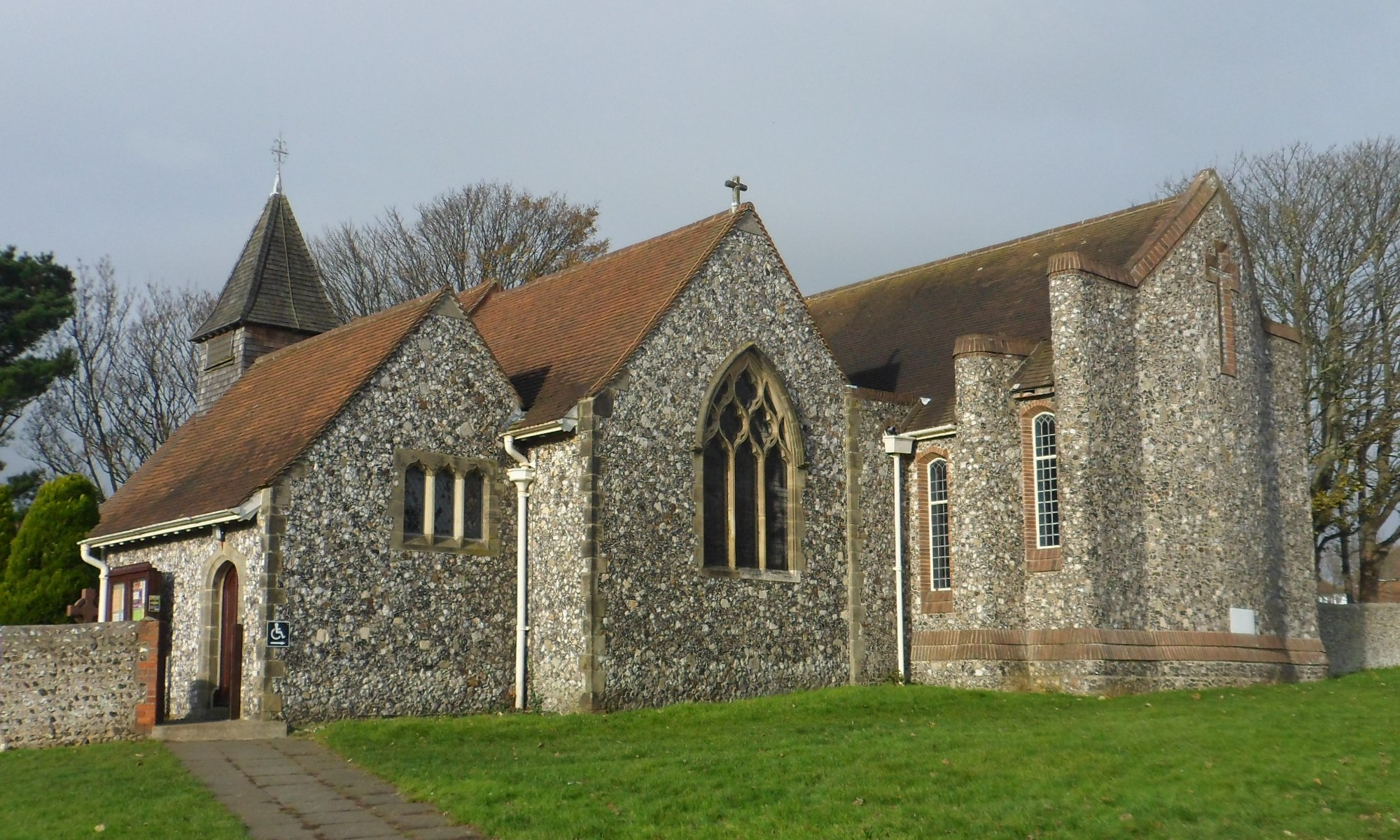
Wagner wanted to rebuild the derelict St Peter's Church at West Blatchington, but this did not happen until after his death.

Unlike his other churches, Wagner's final church was built as a memorial to a specific man and was funded principally by an endowment from his mother. St Anne's Church on Burlington Street in the East Cliff area near Royal Crescent commemorated Rev. James Churchill, formerly the Brighton Extra Mural Cemetery chaplain. His mother gave £6,600, and more funding came from his aunt. The endowment paid for the running of the church rather than its construction, for which money was given by Wagner himself (£2,200), its first Perpetual Curate Rev. Alfred Cooper (£2,000), the Society for the Building and Enlargement of Churches (£300) and many other subscribers. Benjamin Ferrey designed the church, which opened on 13 June 1863 nearly a year after Wagner laid the first stone. St Anne's Church was declared redundant in 1983 and was demolished three years later, but its flamboyant church hall survives nearby.

Under Wagner's guidance, Brighton's parish church was also rebuilt from its state of "sad disrepair" in 1853–54 to the design of Richard Cromwell Carpenter. Thomas Walker Horsfield's History, Antiquities and Topography of the County of Sussex (1835) was critical of the "tasteless and unsightly edifice", and inside it was cramped and old-fashioned, resembling an 18th-century preaching-house.

=== West Blatchington ===
Since 1801, the parish of Brighton had been connected with that of nearby West Blatchington as part of the Hundred of Whalesbone. Accordingly, Wagner also held the living of West Blatchington church, although by that time the medieval building had fallen into disrepair and was not used. The village had also declined and had a population of about 80, most of whom were associated with its single farm. Wagner sent curates out to the village to hold services at one of the cottages, but in 1855 he asked the local landowner the Marquess of Abergavenny for permission to rebuild the church. Wagner offered to pay for this and commissioned George Frederick Bodley to design a new building, but the Marquess refused: the tenants of his land did not want to give it up and the residents were said to be happy to walk to St Helen's Church at Hangleton. (Note: West Blatchington's church, St Peter's, was restored and reopened in 1894 after Wagner's death.)

== Disputes and discord ==
With his "masterful character" and centralised power within the parish of Brighton, Wagner found himself at the centre of regular disputes and controversies. Financial, political and personal clashes marked his incumbency. Arguments over the Church rate levied by the Vestry on every resident within the parish lasted throughout his time in Brighton and were "the most bitter cause of strife". Wagner's strongly Tory political views were also at odds with the town's Radicalism and set the influential Brighton Herald newspaper against him.

=== Church rates ===
Church rates were a common cause of dispute throughout the country in the 19th century as Roman Catholics and Nonconformists became more numerous: these religious communities worshipped outside the Church of England but were legally responsible for the upkeep of the Church's buildings as well as of their own. Because Nonconformism was so strong in Brighton by the time Wagner was ordained, he faced hostility straight away. One of the first branches of the Metropolitan Society for the Abolition of Church Rates outside London was formed in Brighton in 1836. Important public figures were involved: Thomas Read Kemp mp, Isaac Newton Wigney mp, Joseph Hume mp, Sir George Brooke-Pechell, 4th Baronet mp and several prominent Nonconformists. A Church rate was first proposed at a public meeting at Brighton Town Hall in 1835 which was chaired by Wagner. The proposed 1% rate was voted out in a public poll after Nonconformist opponents tabled an amendment asking for funds to be raised privately by a committee. At meetings in 1836 and 1839, in response to the churchwardens' proposal of 1 1/2%, the majority of voters supported the opponents' demands to defer any discussion for six months and a year respectively.

In 1840, money was urgently needed for a new burial ground near St Nicholas' Church. A poorly supported public vote supported the Vestry's proposal for a 3% rate; but Wagner's opponents set up a meeting to examine whether the decision was legal and to organise a petition to Parliament demanding the abolition of the Church rate as "unjust in principle ... a violation of the rights of conscience and a continual source of discord ... [in] this parish". Captain Pechell delivered this petition himself after another meeting in March 1841 when a 2% rate was sought for work at St Peter's Church. Although this rate was voted in, events at the next meeting in October 1841 led to "the most notorious incident of Wagner's incumbency". At this meeting, another 1% rate was voted out; but in response to a claim by one of Wagner's opponents that it was illegal to charge rates for "laying out a burial ground and embellishments to a church" (for which purposes the March 1841 rate was levied), the money raised was removed from the parish accounts and the money could not be spent. Accordingly, when the clock on St Peter's Church stopped in November 1841, it was not re-wound because the allocated money was not available. The Vestry stated that as the clock benefited everybody, its maintenance should be met by public funds—the Church rate. This was unpopular with the public, and Wagner began to face criticism and "petty persecution". On 15 January 1842, in response to mockery by a group of boys, he chased one into a house, reprimanded him and hit him with his riding crop. Although the boy's mother supported the vicar's actions, his father sought to prosecute Wagner for assault, and he was recommended to solicitor Sidney Bennett—one of Wagner's fiercest opponents. He insisted on a summons being issued, and Wagner appeared in front of the magistrates on 20 January 1842. The bench was made up of a mixture of his supporters and opponents, including Isaac Wigney who led proceedings. Wagner was fined £2 (instead of the £5 sought by Bennett), and the incident affected Wagner's reputation in Brighton for the rest of his life.

Vestry meetings continued in the same vein for several years, with regular arguments, votes and polls about the levying of rates. Even a favourable High Court ruling in 1847, which should have helped Wagner's cause, did little to deter his opponents. Wagner stopped attending Vestry meetings for a time from 1843 "in protest against past bad behaviour", but soon returned. Meanwhile, St Nicholas' Church was falling into disrepair and was grossly inadequate for the hundreds of poor people who tried to attend services, such that a church rate of several percent would have been needed for a full restoration. In 1852, though, Wagner took decisive action when the Duke of Wellington died: he suggested the church should be rebuilt as a memorial to the Duke, called a meeting to this effect at the Town Hall and pledged £1,000 himself. Eventually nearly £5,000 was raised, and in April 1853 the Bishop granted permission for the church to close for restoration. Richard Cromwell Carpenter, who had recently designed St Paul's Church for Wagner, undertook the restoration at a final cost of £5,769.18s.7d., and the church reopened in April 1854. Church rates, which had severely affected the early part of his incumbency, accordingly ceased to be a problem in 1852; and Wagner's workload was reduced further in 1854 when Brighton was incorporated as a town. Administration passed from the Vestry and the Brighton Commissioners (of which Wagner was a member) to a mayor, 12 aldermen and six elected councillors in each of six wards.

=== Frederick Robertson ===
Wagner's reputation in Brighton was damaged again in 1853 when he was an involved in an incident with popular preacher Frederick William Robertson of Holy Trinity Church in Ship Street. In May 1853 Robertson had a mental breakdown which was blamed on overwork. Holy Trinity Church offered to pay for a curate to help ease the burden; but Wagner disapproved of Robertson's choice, Rev. Ernest Tower, and vetoed him. This was apparently due to an earlier disagreement between Tower and Wagner in which Wagner was affronted by Tower's behaviour in connection with a local society. Wagner spoke to Robertson after a service at Holy Trinity about the matter, apparently believing that he would nominate another curate; but Robertson was distressed by the incident and later wrote to Wagner criticising him for his "permanent unforgivingness" and stating that he could not nominate anybody else. Within three months Robertson had died. Wagner's opponents claimed that he had "forced himself upon Robertson, who wanted to go home to rest", and that his unreasonable attitude had contributed to Robertson's mental distress and early death at the age of 37.

=== Purchas affair ===
Although the Robertson incident "probably did Wagner's reputation more harm than any other single incident" during his time as Vicar of Brighton, the dispute he had with Rev. John Purchas—formerly one of his own curates—was of greater national significance because of the controversial ritualist practices Purchas brought in when he took over the incumbency of St James's Chapel in Kemptown. Protests spread from Brighton itself to the Bishop of Chichester and then to the Church of England's ecclesiastical court; and the affair took up much of Wagner's time and energy during the last four years of his life.

St James's Chapel was one of the three Anglican churches in Brighton at the time Wagner became Vicar of the town. It was owned by Nathaniel Kemp of Ovingdean House, (Note: Nathaniel Kemp was Thomas Read Kemp's uncle.) who appointed Rev. C.D. Maitland as Perpetual curate. Under his ministry, "services were of the most evangelical tone imaginable". When he died in 1865, Purchas bought the building and the right of presentation. He had been influenced by ritualist views while working as a curate at St Paul's Church under Wagner's son Arthur. After maintaining the chapel's evangelical style of services for several months, Purchas changed to a strongly ritualist style of worship from September 1866. The clergy wore full vestments, Purchas himself wore a cope and biretta, and incense was used throughout the service. At a time when Roman Catholicism was still viewed with suspicion and animosity, such Catholic-style practices raised "an immediate outcry" among the clergy at other local churches. Wagner received letters claiming that Purchas was trying to "un-Protestantise our Protestant Church" and that the blame lay with his son, Arthur Wagner, whose introduction of ritualist services at St Paul's Church "introduced the seeds of division into the Church in Brighton".

Purchas relented for a time, but after further complaints in 1868 he reacted by inviting 1,500 people to a special service at the chapel in September of that year, at which ultra-ritualist practices were given full rein. Amid negative publicity from The Times, Wagner tried to stop his former curate from continuing in this vein, but was rebuffed. He involved the Bishop of Chichester, but Purchas gave the same reply: because he owned the chapel, he could do as he wished—even when the Bishop banned him from ministering anywhere in the diocese. Riots ensued inside and outside the chapel, and the Bishop appealed to the Court of Arches, the Church of England's ecclesiastical court. The matter was not finally settled until after Wagner's death. Wagner's actions throughout the controversy attempted to demonstrate "tolerance and restraint": he terminated Purchas's position as a curate at St Nicholas' Church, made it clear that he was unimpressed by deliberately ostentatious ritualist practices, and stated that he tried to ensure that "every phase of religious opinion within [the Church of England]" should be fairly represented in Brighton, so that every Anglican could worship according to their wishes. Nevertheless, he found himself in the middle of a scandal in which "the press had a field day" and which had brought the Anglican Church in Brighton to national attention.

== Later life and death ==
Henry Michell Wagner had various health problems in his middle and old age. He had an operation to repair a fistula in 1833. Then in 1855, he suffered an unknown feverish illness which was so severe it was expected to lead to his death. Helped by the "devoted" attention of his housekeeper, he was out of danger by the autumn; to help his recovery he travelled to Malta and Egypt during the winter. He sailed from Valletta to Alexandria on board a P&O steamship, on which he spent much time with Sir James Outram, 1st Baronet, then spent a month in Cairo, where he suffered more health problems. He abandoned a proposed trip to Jerusalem and sailed back to Malta, but was made even more ill by the inadequate food on board: too weak to eat proper meals, he could only manage gruel.

In the 1860s he suffered from increasingly frequent bouts of gout and was left with a permanent limp. He then suffered another serious illness in 1864. He managed to continue his regular activities until just before his death, though: he would get up at 3 am, did not go to bed until 8 pm or 9 pm, continued to administer parish affairs on his own, and always visited sick parishioners himself rather than delegating the responsibility to his curates.

His final illness came in September 1870. He preached as normal on 18 September and attended a meeting with the Bishop of Chichester Richard Durnford the following day, but afterwards he was confined to bed by complications of his chronic gout. He died at lunchtime on 7 October 1870, just short of his 78th birthday, with his son Arthur in attendance. His funeral, "which must have been one of the grandest ever held in Brighton", was on 15 October 1870 at St Nicholas' Church and was attended by every Anglican clergyman from Brighton, civic leaders, pupils of the schools he founded and many other people. Every Anglican church in Brighton was decorated with black. Wagner was succeeded as Vicar of Brighton by Reverend John Hannah.

== Legacy ==
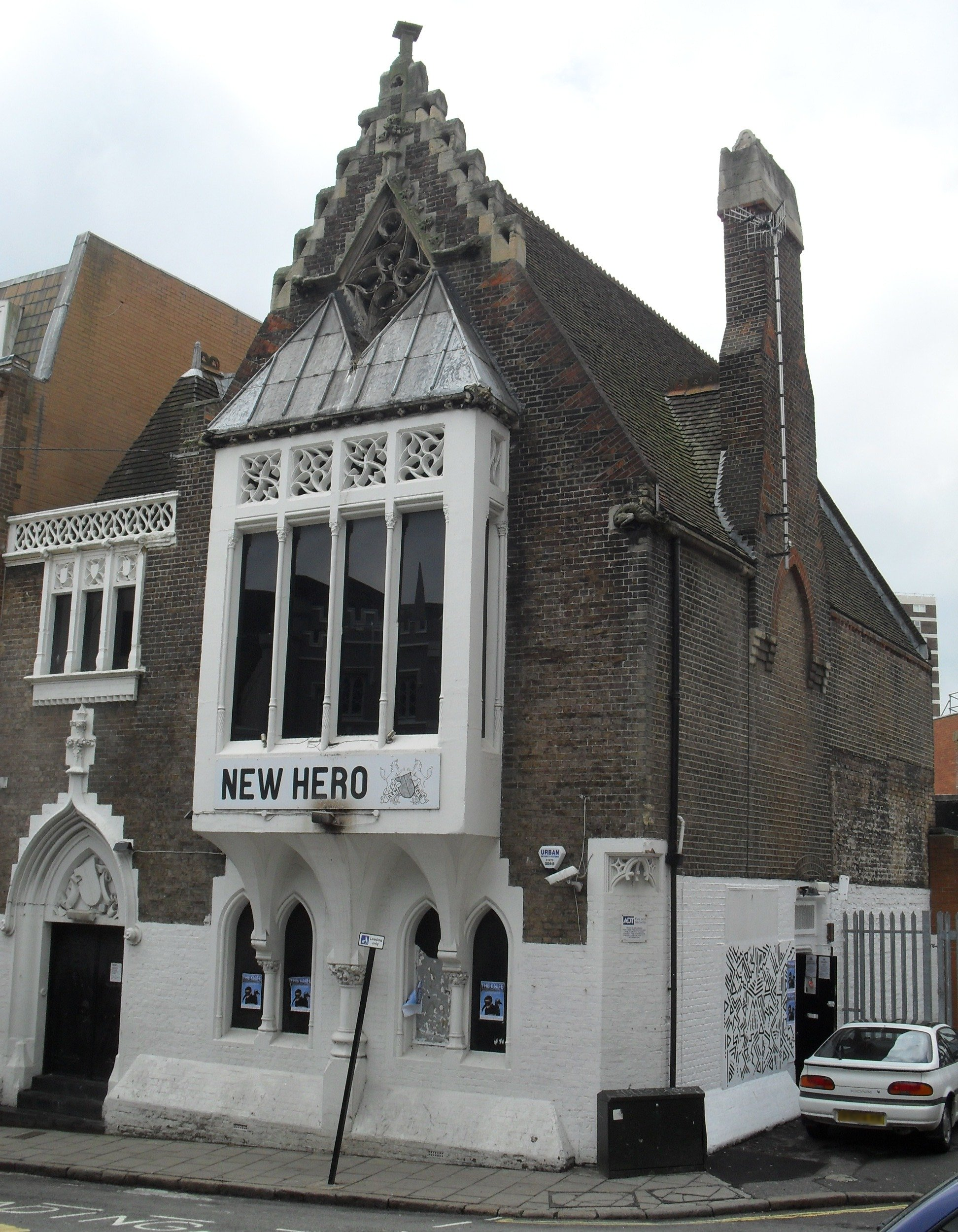
Wagner helped the Swan Downer School move to this new building at 11 Dyke Road, Brighton.

As well as building several churches in Brighton, Henry Michell Wagner founded or assisted many social, educational and charitable causes in the town. "His charitable activities ... probably formed the best side of his work in Brighton". Soon after he arrived in Brighton, he started raising money for the Royal Sussex County Hospital, which was under construction at the time. Of the £15,000 construction cost, £6,000 had already been raised by its founder Thomas Read Kemp and George Wyndham, 3rd Earl of Egremont; (Note: £1,000 and £5,000 respectively. Kemp also donated the site.) Wagner was the main fundraiser for the remainder and donated some money himself, as did his brother George. He was on the management board and the board of governors for the rest of his life, and played an active part in the running of the hospital. He also selected the hospital's first chaplain—Rev. J. Anderson, curate of nearby St George's Church. An earlier healthcare facility was the Brighton Dispensary (founded in 1809), which was partly superseded by the Royal Sussex County Hospital but changed its focus and expanded in 1850. Wagner led this expansion, and the institution survived until the mid-20th century. Wagner was also involved with the Eye Infirmary (as vice-president and a trustee), the Blind Asylum and the Deaf and Dumb Asylum (both as president), and the Board of Guardians of the Poor (for which he was a director from 1824 until his death).

Until the Elementary Education Act 1870 was passed, there was no centralised provision of schooling for children below secondary level. Churches, private individuals and charitable institutions provided what they could. The Church of England-led National Society for Promoting Religious Education had the objective of founding schools, which became known as National Schools. There were none in Brighton in 1824, when Wagner arrived in the town; by the time of his death in 1870, he had founded nine, including the architecturally magnificent Church Street National School in the North Laine. Built in 1829 in an elaborate Gothic Revival style, it was infamously demolished in 1971 when its application for listed status was delayed by a postal strike. Wagner was also "instrumental in securing" the Swan Downer School's move from a cramped building in the North Laine to purpose-built premises at 11 Dyke Road. Swan Downer, a rich merchant from Brighton, had provided in his will for the foundation of a school for poor girls.

Wagner was involved with the Royal Society for the Prevention of Cruelty to Animals: he became vice-president of the newly formed Sussex branch in 1869, and since 1842 had given the society £20 per year. He was also vice-president of the Sussex branch of the Early Closing Association, and in 1856 agreed to pay an annual subscription of £10.10s. to the newly formed Brighton Scripture Readers Association.

The Percy and Wagner Almshouses were partly funded by Wagner and his sister Mary. The first six houses were built in 1795 in an isolated position on the Lewes Road; Wagner added another six (three on each end) in 1859. The small cottages are of yellow brick and in the Gothic Revival style and are Grade II-listed.

== Commemorations ==
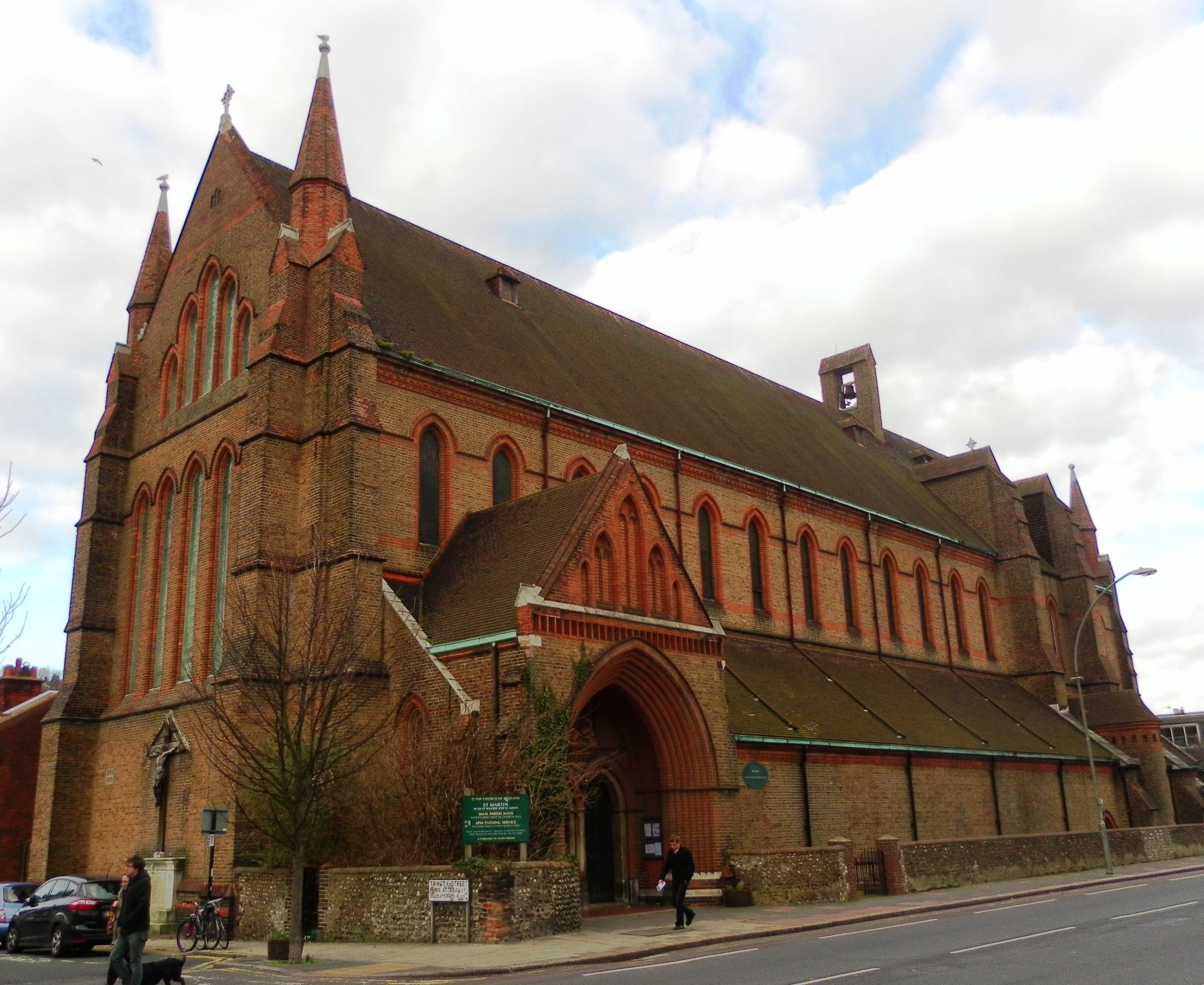
St Martin's Church (1872–75) was built to commemorate Henry Michell Wagner.

St Martin's Church on the Lewes Road, near the Percy and Wagner Almshouses, was built for Arthur Wagner and his brothers in memory of their father. George Somers Clarke junior, whose father was a long-time friend of Henry Michell Wagner, was the architect. Brighton's largest church is austere outside, belying the "breathtaking magnificence" of its opulent interior. The font (dating from 1875, when the church was finished) is inlaid with marble collected by Henry Michell Wagner during his European travels.

The Church Street National School featured a bust of Wagner carved by John Edward Carew, but it was destroyed during the building's demolition. Another bust survives in the Brighton Museum, though. After Wagner recovered from severe illness in 1855, he paid £150 for a Clayton and Bell-designed stained glass window at Chichester Cathedral. Themes of healing were depicted in the artwork. The window was destroyed by World War II bombing. Wagner is also commemorated by a stained glass window at St Nicholas' Church, which was presented to the church by his friend Somers Clarke. He was a solicitor who served as Clerk to the Vestry of Brighton for more than 60 years, and was the father of the architect of St Martin's Church.

== Personal life and character ==
=== Marriages ===
Wagner's first recorded meeting with Elizabeth Harriott Douglas came on 13 November 1820, and they became engaged in late 1821. She was the daughter of William Douglas (1768–1819), the Precentor of Salisbury Cathedral and Archdeacon of Wilts, and the granddaughter of John Douglas, whose ecclesiastical positions included Bishop of Salisbury between 1791 and 1807. They were married on 20 March 1823 at St James's Church, Piccadilly, after which they travelled to Brighton to stay with Wagner's mother at her house, 49 Old Steine. After spending a week in Brighton, where they attended the Chapel Royal and met the Vicar of Brighton Dr Robert James Carr, they travelled to Herstmonceux to visit George Wagner. Henry Michell Wagner is said to have "read prayers at Herstmonceux church" on Easter Sunday. They moved into Wagner's house at Eton on 12 April 1823. On 13 June 1824, their son Arthur Douglas Wagner was born at Park Hill in Windsor, a house belonging to Elizabeth Harriott Wagner's family. He was named Arthur in honour of the Duke of Wellington. During this period they made plans to move to nearby Winkfield. The vicar of its parish church was a relative of Elizabeth, and Henry Michell Wagner assisted there—effectively "act[ing] as an unpaid curate". This later caused controversy among his religious opponents in Brighton.

Elizabeth (known as Zimmie) suffered health problems after Arthur's birth. She was diagnosed with oedema, and despite regular fluid-letting and the pursuit of some questionable remedies ("she was electrified and [received] 64 strokes" according to one diary entry), by 1829 she could hardly stand or walk. On 27 November 1829, at the age of 32, she died at the old vicarage in Nile Street. Henry Michell Wagner's mother and unmarried sister moved in to help bring up Arthur. They continued to live in the vicarage until their deaths in 1844 and 1868 respectively. His mother was buried at St Nicholas' Church in the Michell family vault, as was his first wife; his sister's grave is in Brighton Extra Mural Cemetery.

In 1838 Wagner married Mary Sikes Watson, the 38-year-old daughter of Joshua Watson—a prominent High churchman and philanthropist. She was "of too great Victorian piety for comfort": letters between her and Wagner during their courtship discussed administrative matters and philosophical principles rather than love and romance. The marriage produced two sons—Joshua Watson Wagner (b. 29 May 1839) and Henry Wagner (b. 16 July 1840)—but Mary died on 20 July 1840 because of complications with the latter birth. She was also buried in the family vault at St Nicholas' Church.

=== Religious views ===
Wagner was an "old style High churchman" with "pre-Tractarian" rather than fully Tractarian views. The influence of his second wife's father Joshua Watson—"a leader of the High Church movement" in the mid-19th century—may have been significant. He never had the ritualist zeal of his son Arthur Douglas Wagner, though, and had concerns over his views and the way he ministered at St Paul's Church.

Wagner was a "zealous, devoted clergyman". His strength of character meant he would not compromise his principles for anybody. King William IV once visited Brighton on a Sunday. All church bells in the town were traditionally rung to herald a king's visit, but when asked what he would do Wagner replied "on a Sunday, the bells are rung only for the King of Kings". (The famously pious Queen Adelaide was delighted by this response.) He was also very wealthy, which allowed him to act as "the best kind of benevolent despot": using his money both to help as many residents as he could and to wield great influence within Brighton. Under his guidance, the town effectively became "a bishopric within a bishopric" in the words of the Bishop of Chichester. Throughout his life, the town was still covered by one large parish of which St Nicholas' was the parish church and the other Anglican churches merely chapels of ease. He was permitted by law to choose perpetual curates for each chapel of ease; (Note: Except for proprietary chapels, for which the proprietor could nominate the Perpetual curate during the chapel's first 40 years of existence—after which the right of presentation reverted to Wagner.) accordingly he had overall control of the whole parish and each church within it.

Wagner was opposed to pew rents, though not so strongly as his son. When St Paul's Church opened, Arthur wanted all 1,200 seats to be free, but Henry held the more old-fashioned view that there should be a mix. Accordingly, 460 pews were for rent and the rest were free; Arthur Wagner abolished all rented pews in 1873 after his father's death. The controversial subject caused Henry Wagner problems at other times. In 1858, his nephew Rev. Thomas Coombe—Perpetual curate of All Saints Church—got into a disagreement with him after altering the interior to add extra pews for rent, and tried to prevent Wagner entering the church. Wagner had to appeal to the Bishop of Chichester Ashurst Gilbert to deal with the situation. The events of 1824 and St Margaret's Chapel also left Wagner with "an enduring dislike of proprietary chapels". In his 46 years as Vicar of Brighton, during an era when their construction was commonplace, he allowed no others to be built after St Margaret's, St George's, Holy Trinity and St Mary's were completed (the last of these opened in 1827.) When the rector of St Christopher's Church, Lympsham offered in 1858 to pay for a new proprietary chapel in Brighton with 100 free pews and 200 for rent, both Wagner and his sister wrote to him "kindly but firmly" describing his "insuperable objection" to such chapels. As Vicar of Brighton, he gained the right of presentation after each proprietary chapel had been open for 40 years; but in 1856 the Marquess of Blandford tried to abolish this right by raising a bill before Parliament. Wagner, who "clung firmly to the rights of presentation" he expected to receive, tried to persuade the Marquess to exclude Brighton's four proprietary chapels from the bill—first by going through his solicitor friend Somers Clarke, then by asking Brighton MPs Lord Alfred Hervey (1816–1875) and Sir George Brooke-Pechell, 4th Baronet for their support. The bill did not pass into law, and the right of presentation did eventually pass to Wagner in each case.

=== Character ===
Always a strong and assertive character, Wagner was not afraid to challenge behaviour and people he disapproved of. In 1822, when the then 15-year-old Marquess of Douro was behaving arrogantly towards the household's servants, Wagner hit him and wrote a strongly worded letter to the Duchess of Wellington criticising the boy as "haughty in the extreme" and the Duchess's own attitude: "There is a veil before your eyes. You overlook Douro's faults". Likewise, when conducting evensong at St Peter's Church one evening in 1834, he saw two military officers talking and misbehaving. "He strode down the aisle ... and stationed himself between them for the rest of the service", and when they asked for an apology for the embarrassment caused to them he instead demanded that they apologise for their conduct, otherwise he would write to his friend the Duke of Wellington and inform him about his officers' behaviour.

An incident in January 1824, in which the house at Eton was broken into and money stolen from Wagner's pupils, also "throws a good deal of light on his character". He initially set out to find the thief—by engaging the police, using his own efforts and enlisting the help of one of a gang of beggars who often loitered around the house. Wagner captured the offender himself; he was a man whom Wagner had employed for several years despite incidents of improper conduct, because the man's father had persuaded him to give him another chance. As soon as he captured the man, "Wagner's reaction to the crime completely changed, and compassion became his dominant consideration". The death penalty was applied to crimes of burglary in which more than five shillings was stolen; Wagner attempted to get the charge changed to one of felony, and stated that only three shillings was stolen when in fact the man took £2.3s. Wagner later signed a petition for clemency which was presented to King George IV, and the man was spared the death sentence. A sense of fairness and personal responsibility was also demonstrated in his reaction to the Marquess of Abergavenny's refusal to allow the rebuilding and reopening of St Peter's Church, West Blatchington. Wagner had asked George Frederick Bodley to produce a plan; when the project was cancelled, he decided to pay Bodley £10.10s. as partial compensation for the fee he would have received, as it was "the proper and liberal thing to do".

One of Wagner's main strengths was his speaking—both as a preacher (the Brighton Gazette's obituary praised his "short ... clear, pointed and vigorous" sermons) and when making appeals for political or financial purposes. His great financial generosity helped his appeals be so successful. Overall, he gave £3,327 to the various churchbuilding and restoration projects he was involved in during his time as Vicar of Brighton—a large sum for the time.

Wagner wrote a diary for many years. This was more a factual list of events than an expression of his feelings, and when any emotion was demonstrated it was always "in a very restrained way" and was usually written in Latin, Italian or French. For example, after an evening spent with his future wife Elizabeth, his diary entry for the day read "O qual gioja!" (Oh what joy!). On another occasion, though, after two evenings in her company he commented "Quem deus vult perdere, prius dementat" (Those whom God would destroy, He first makes mad).

Wagner was fond of entertainment and socialising. He regularly played cards until late at night—although he admonished himself in his diary for doing so—and was a keen tennis and billiards player. He also attended horse races and theatre productions both before and after his ordination. Earlier in his life he played a lot of cricket and enjoyed horseriding. He was comfortable in the presence of royalty, with whom he regularly mixed because of his association with the Duke and Duchess of Wellington. He was invited to see both the Duke of Kent and King George III lying in state, attended King George III's funeral, attended the coronation of King George IV as the guest of the Duke and Duchess, and visited the new king's cottage at Windsor Park—about which he wrote in his diary "little interesting is to be seen". King William IV often invited him to parties and events at the Royal Pavilion, and Queen Adelaide and the late King George III's daughter Princess Augusta Sophia were also on friendly terms with him.

=== Opponents and controversies ===
"So common during the 46 years of Wagner's ministry" in Brighton was the scenario of Wagner being at odds with people in the town: colleagues within the Church of England, religious and political opponents, members of the public and others. A man of strong views, he disliked opposition "and was unforgiving to those who had opposed him in the past". He mellowed later in life, though, and was always much more forgiving and tolerant of the rare ecclesiastical disagreements he was involved in than of the three types of dispute which characterised his time in Brighton. These were political disagreements, clashes of personality and financial disputes.

His greatest difficulties occurred in Vestry meetings when battles were fought over Church rates. Although on one occasion Wagner was formally "censure[d] ... for his improper conduct in the chair", and often acted in a "high-handed" fashion as chairman, he always treated his opponents courteously—even when meetings became so heated that they reputedly threatened to throw him down the Town Hall's stairs. (Note: As stated by Stopford Brooke in his Life and Letters of F.W. Robertson (of Brighton) (1865).) Influential opponents included John Colbatch (owner of the Albion Hotel), Presbyterian minister Rev. James Edwards, local Quaker Isaac Bass, and Lt-Col. Thomas Trusty Trickey. These men often abused Wagner and disrupted meetings by filibustering; Trickey has been called the main antagonist. In contrast, the minister of Union Chapel Rev. John Nelson Goulty maintained good relations with Wagner despite their regular debates and disagreements. Goulty served the Nonconformist community for the same length of time as Wagner served the Anglican church, and their influence over their respective communities was similar. Wagner's confident and forthright manner of defending compulsory rates and supporting the Vestry led one of his main opponents to remark in 1852 "although you have many faults, I am proud of you ... if you had gone into the army, you would, with your indomitable energy and your great ability, have made a second Wellington".

Politically, Wagner was a High Tory: this made him "very unpopular in zealous Whig circles" during a time when there was great hostility between the parties—especially in Brighton, which was dominated by radical Whig views.

Wagner's experiences with Barnard Gregory and St Margaret's Chapel showed that he could sometimes compromise in the spirit of conciliation, but the reasons for his opposition to Edward Everard's appointment as Perpetual curate are unknown. Although Everard gave up the position in 1828, he was still active locally as rector of St Michael and All Angels Church, Southwick, founder and first incumbent of St Andrew's Church, Brunswick Town, and chaplain of the King's private chapel. His motivation for founding St Andrew's Church, a chapel of ease to Hove's parish church, may have been "to remove himself from Wagner's jurisdiction" in neighbouring Brighton.
