= St Nicolas Church, Portslade =

Church in England

St Nicolas, Portslade
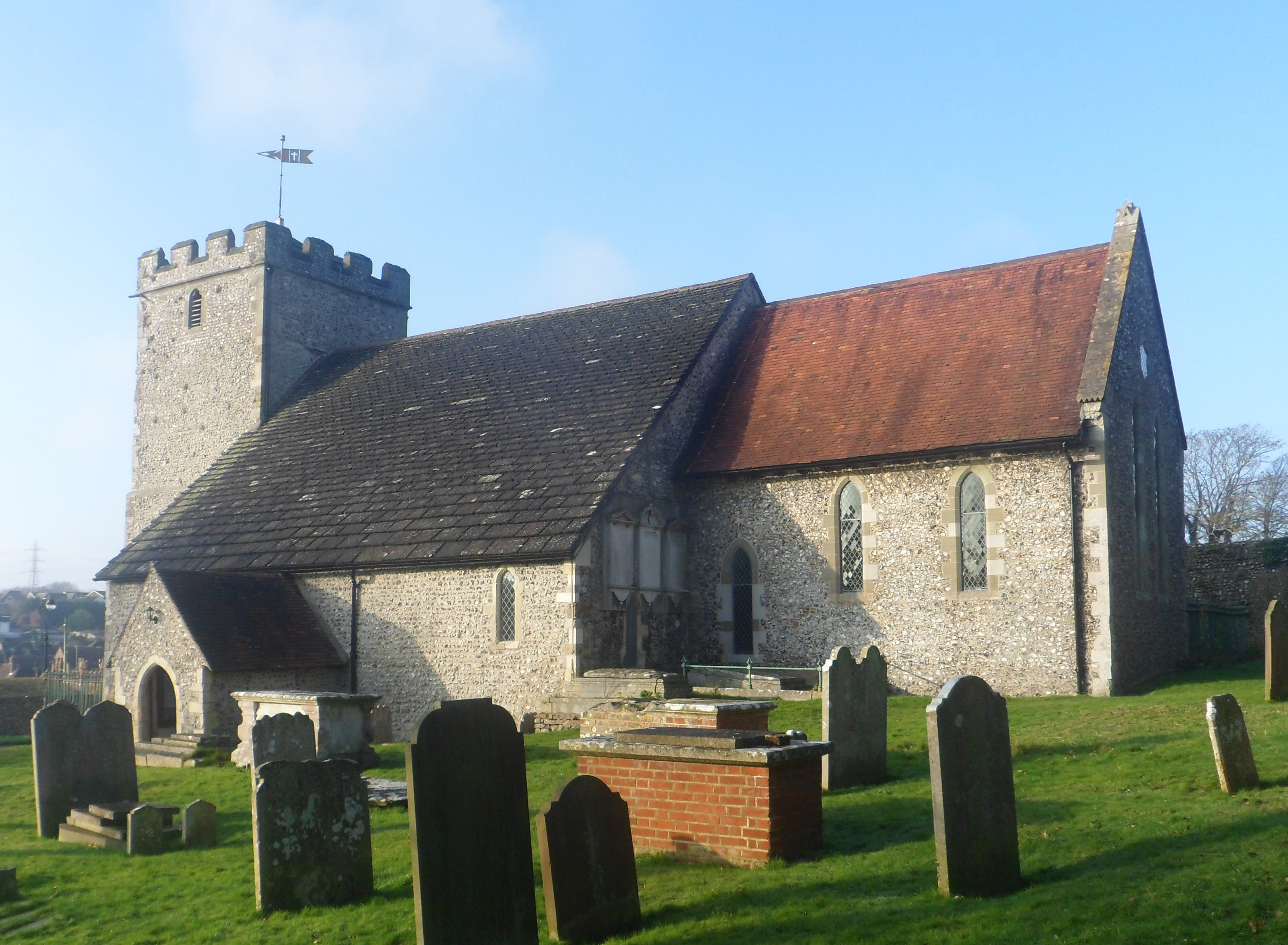
- St Nicolas, Portslade
- 50.8431°N 0.2182°W
- Denomination: Church of England
- Churchmanship: Anglo Catholic
- Website: Parish of Portslade & Mile Oak

History
- Dedication: St Nicolas

Administration
- Province: Canterbury
- Diocese: Chichester
- Archdeaconry: Chichester
- Deanery: Rural Deanery of Hove
- Parish: Portslade, Parish of Portslade & Mile Oak

Clergy
- Vicar: vacancy (Interregnum

St Nicolas Church is an Anglican church in the Portslade area of the English city of Brighton and Hove. It has 12th-century origins, and serves the old village of Portslade, inland from the mostly 19th-century Portslade-by-Sea area.

It is one of the numerous hall churches in southern England.

== History ==
A Roman road ran from north to south through the area which later became Portslade. There was no recorded Roman settlement, although Samian ware pottery has been found nearby and neighbouring Southwick had a Roman villa. A village began to develop in mediaeval times, and a manor house and church were built close to each other in the 12th century. As originally built, the church consisted of a chancel, a nave with an aisle on the south side, and a square tower at the west end. The nave, aisle and part of the tower appear to have been built first, along with the typically Norman architectural feature of twin pillars of Caen stone; the chancel and the upper part of the tower were built in the early 13th century. The bell tower, with battlements, was added at the top of the tower in the 14th century; the porch on the south side was added later, but probably by the 16th century.

Portslade was originally the most populous and important of the villages and parishes west of Brighton, and St Nicolas Church never declined to a ruined state, unlike the churches at Hove (St Andrew's), Aldrington (St Leonard's), Hangleton (St Helen's) or West Blatchington (St Peter's). However, the fabric of the church and its fixtures did decay gradually over time, and like many churches in Brighton and Hove it was altered and restored during the Victorian era. Medieval wall paintings were uncovered in the nave in 1847, but were whitewashed over and lost. The mural depicted the Last Judgement; an illustrated article was subsequently written by the incumbent vicar for an archaeological journal, in which a date of 1440 was attributed to the painting. An aisle was added on the north side in 1849. In 1946, local stained glass designers Cox & Barnard made a small window which was installed in the church tower. It commemorates former verger A.C. Wheatland and depicts the church's patron saint.

The church roof was made of heavy stone slabs, and significant repair work had to be carried out in 1959: it was not only sagging in places, but had been displaced by 1 foot (30 cm) because of their weight—despite the support given by substantial wooden king posts. For most of that year, a jack, anchored under the chancel arch, was used to gradually move the roof back into position. At the same time, a vestry and a gallery for the organ were added.

One of Portslade's most prominent families, the Brackenburys, had their family vault at the church, and between 1869 and 1874 the Brackenbury Chapel was built at its west end. Highly elaborate, in contrast to the simple church, it was built by Hannah Brackenbury, who was buried there when she died in 1873. She was a benefactor to local causes and charities, and to Balliol College, Oxford, where a debating society and a building at the college entrance are named after her. She also donated land and money for the construction of the local primary school—a Gothic building of 1872.

== Architecture ==
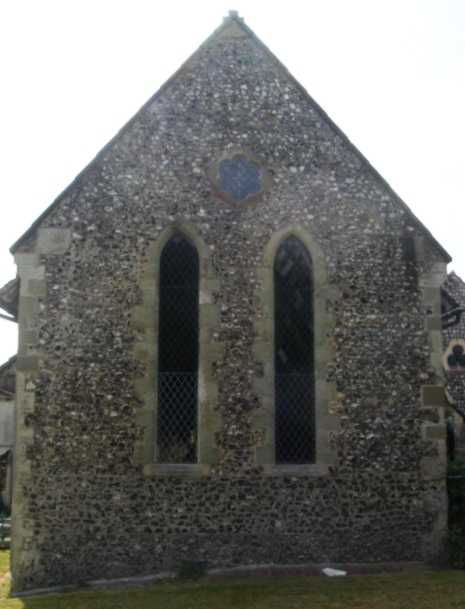
The twin lancets and sexfoil in the east wall

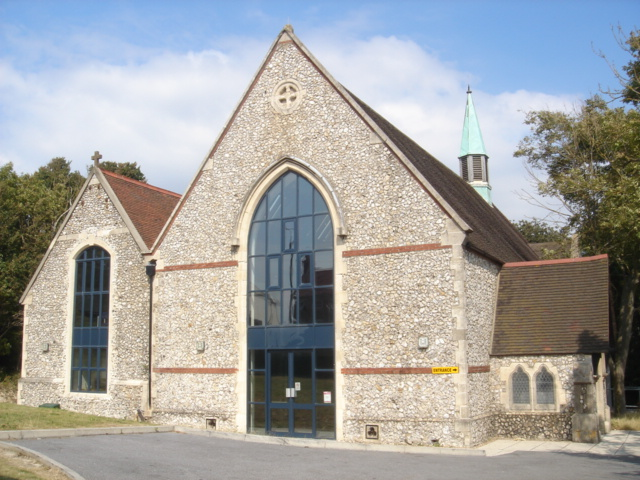
St Andrew's Church

The church is a relatively plain, uncomplicated structure, similar in layout to many 12th- and 13th-century churches in Sussex. The chancel, with its chamfered Norman arch, leads to the three-bay nave with aisles on the south and north sides. In the older south aisle, the piers have capitals decorated with a scallop design. The 19th-century north aisle is similar but wider. Also in the chancel are a restored sedilia, piscina (both 13th-century, and on the south wall), pulpit of stone, a modern altar, and a reredos and panelling dating from 1921. Most windows are lancets; some date from the 13th century, and most contain plain glass. Two stained glass windows depict St Francis of Assisi and St Nicolas. The east end windows consist of two tall, narrow lancets below a sexfoil (six-lobed window).

The Brackenbury Chapel is more ornate, featuring a three-pane lancet window with stained glass (including the family's coat of arms), elaborately carved wood, stonework and black and green marble. In the centre is a marble tomb, and the walls—flanked by arcades—feature memorial tablets to family members. The chapel is built of knapped flint, unlike the rest of the church which is pale rubble-work. A partition links the chapel and the north aisle of the church.

The turreted tower, in three parts—the 12th-century base, the 13th-century upper section and the bell tower—is of coursed stone rubble-work, rather than the random arrangement in the main walls of the church. It has no buttresses.

== The church today ==
The church was listed at Grade II* on 19 July 1950. As of February 2001, it was one of 70 Grade II*-listed buildings and structures, and 1,218 listed buildings of all grades, in the city of Brighton and Hove.

Services are held daily, with two or three on Sundays.

St Andrew's Church was built on Church Road in Portslade-by-Sea between 1863 and 1864. It was designed by Brighton-based architect Edmund Scott. In 1898 it was given its own parish, but this has now been united with the parish of St Nicolas. The combined parish covers the whole of Portslade-by-Sea and Portslade Village, and extends some way on to the south face of the South Downs. As from September 2013 the status of St Andrews was changed to a "Chapel of Ease" and now will be only used occasionally for religious service. In September 2013, St Nicolas Portslade & St Andrew Portslade were united with The Good Shepherd Mile Oak to form the new Parish of Portslade & Mile Oak.

== See also ==
- List of places of worship in Brighton and Hove
