= St Peter's Church, West Blatchington =

Church in East Sussex, England

St Peter's, West Blatchington
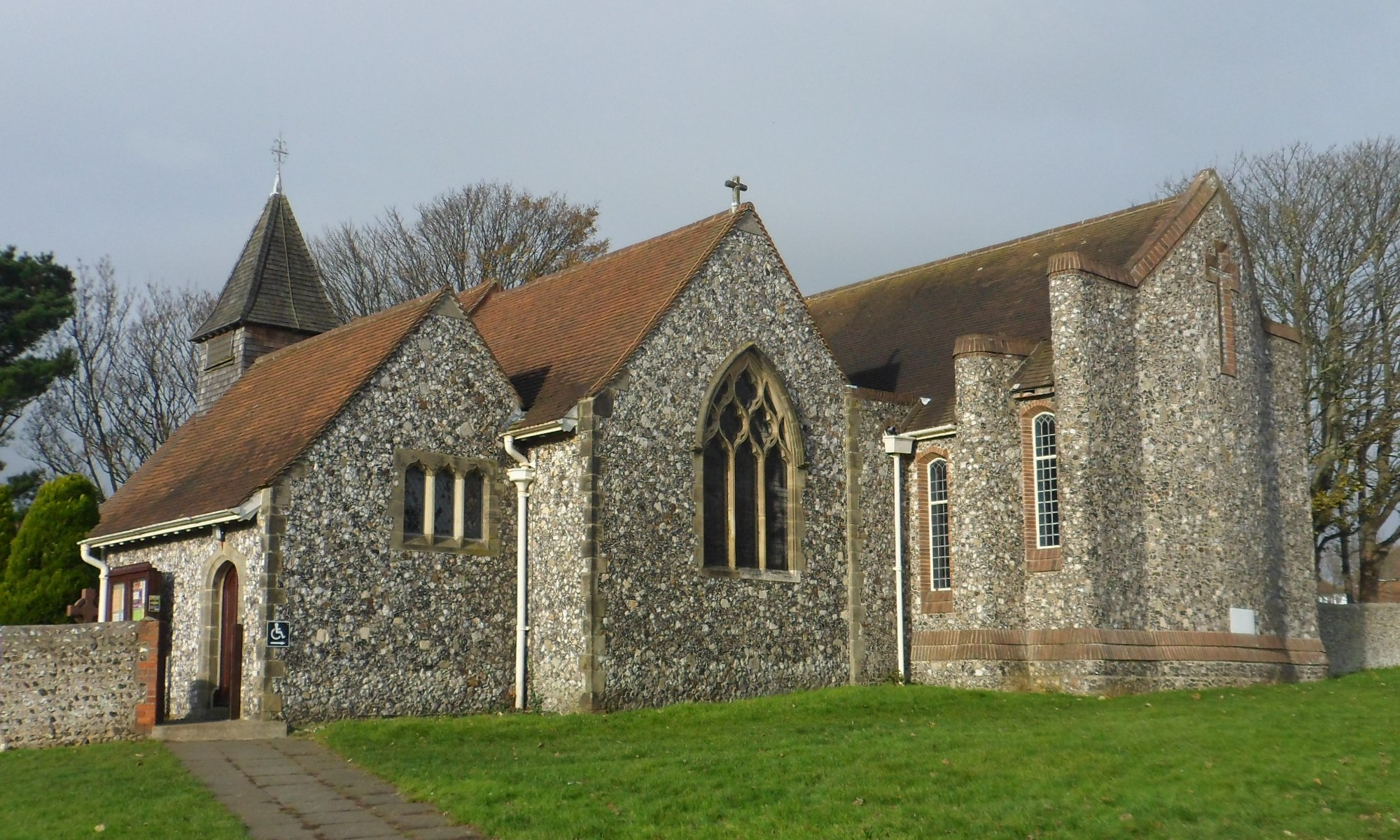
- St Peter's, West Blatchington
- 50.8472°N 0.1851°W
- Denomination: Church of England
- Website: St Peter's West Blatchington

Administration
- Province: Canterbury
- Diocese: Chichester
- Archdeaconry: Brighton & Lewes
- Deanery: Rural Deanery of Hove
- Parish: West Blatchington, St Peter

Clergy
- Rector: The Revd Timothy A J Gage,

St Peter's Church is an Anglican church in the West Blatchington area of Hove, part of the English city of Brighton and Hove. Although it has 11th- and 12th-century origins, the church was rebuilt from a ruined state in the late 19th century and extended substantially in the 1960s, and little trace remains of the ancient building. The church serves the parish of West Blatchington, a residential area in the north of Hove near the border with Brighton.

== History ==
Like nearby Hangleton, West Blatchington started as an isolated village on the South Downs north of Hove, and had declined to such an extent by the 19th century that only the manor house, the church and some farm buildings and cottages were left. West Blatchington Windmill, near the church, had been built in 1820.

The parish church, St Peter's, was thought to have been built in the 12th century by the Normans. Archaeological work carried out in the 1980s, however, revealed 11th-century, Saxon origins. In particular, the flint walls which survive as part of the present building contain numerous pieces of Roman-era debris, such as fragments of broken tiles and stones from furnaces. These would have been gathered from the nearby Roman villa in the 11th century when the church was being built: Saxon reuse and recycling of Roman-era building materials and detritus was not unusual. (The Roman settlement, on a site occupied since the Bronze Age and also containing a few Neolithic artefacts, included ditches, rubbish pits, a cemetery, and kilns for drying corn.) Furthermore, the wall of the main doorway is much thinner than would be expected in a Norman church, and more closely resembles a Saxon wall; and two blocked-up windows high in the south wall are in the Saxon style—although there are also Norman windows elsewhere. It has also been determined that the original church was remodelled early in its life to include a chancel, to which the altar would have been moved. Saxon churches typically had altars in the centre of their rectangular structure; the Norman-era preference was for an altar at one end in a separate chancel.

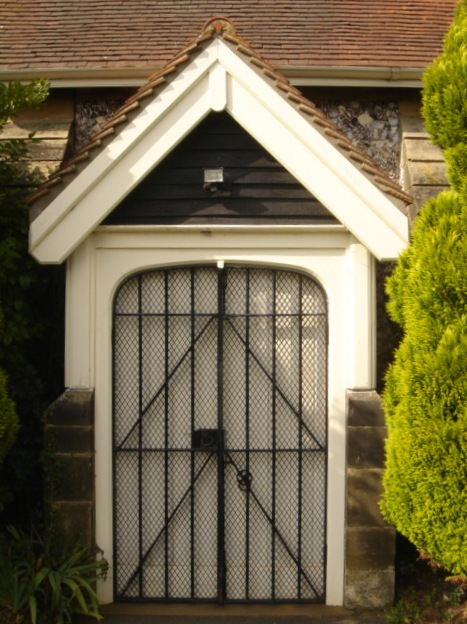
The restored entrance porch

The church was put under the control of Lewes Priory in the early 12th century by Ralph de Luffa, the Bishop of Chichester. In the 16th century, the Priory was destroyed after being surrendered to King Henry VIII, and St Peter's Church was united with St Helen's Church, Hangleton in a single parish. Decline had already set in: the church was disused by 1596, and the parish only had one other inhabited dwelling. The Church Commissioners declared the structure ruined in the 17th century, and only the four walls were left by the early 19th century. For many years during that century, the structure was used as a henhouse by nearby farmers.

The Scrase family and their descendants had lived in West Blatchington manor for more than four centuries, and were held responsible by some for the failure to restore the church earlier than it eventually was. Vicar of Brighton Rev. Henry Michell Wagner proposed a new church, school and graveyard in the village in 1855; these would have been built at his own expense. Two acres of farmland were needed; these were owned by the main local landowner the Marquess of Abergavenny but farmed by his tenants, the Hobson family (descendants of the Scrases). The Marquess agreed but his tenants refused to give the land up, so the plan was put on hold. However, when one of the Hobsons died in 1888, she left money in her will to restore the old church. Somers Clarke, a Brighton native who was responsible for several church restorations and alterations in the area in the late 19th century, was chosen for the work. St Peter's was reopened for worship on 29 June 1891.

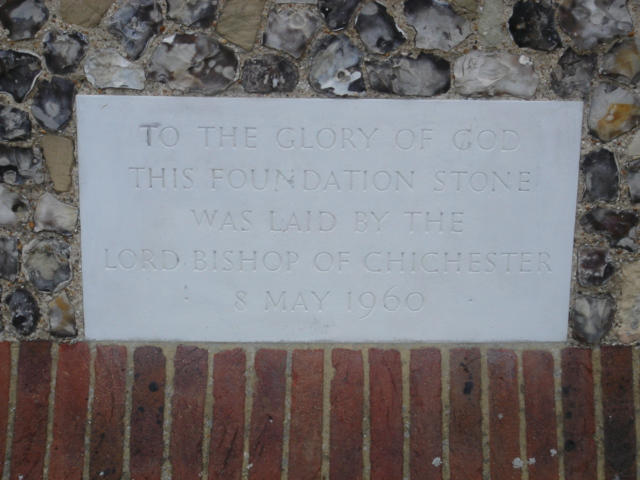
The foundation stone in the 1960 extension

Hove expanded significantly in the first half of the 20th century, and the ancient village of West Blatchington was entirely surrounded by suburban residential development, encouraged by its inclusion in the newly created Borough of Hove in 1928. The rebuilt church was too small for the local population, and more changes were planned. On 8 May 1960 the foundation stone of a large extension on the north side was laid by the Bishop of Chichester, Roger Plumpton Wilson. As at St Leonard's Church, Aldrington, another church in Hove, the extension was essentially a new church built around the existing structure. John Leopold Denman was employed as the architect; he built the exterior in flint and retained the old north wall, which helped the extension to fit in well with the 11th- and 19th-century parts of the church. An unusual arrangement at roof level brings natural light into, and physically links, the old and new parts of the church: there is a group of dormer window-style skylights arranged like a clerestory. The work was completed by 1962. The entrance porch was restored in 1987.

In 1707, money had been raised to purchase the advowson of West Blatchington, separate the church from the parish of Hangleton and unite it with Brighton instead. Until 1744, the benefice were held jointly by the Vicar of Brighton; on 1 August 1744 they were formally united. The church was separated from Brighton and given its own parish again in 1940.

== Architecture ==
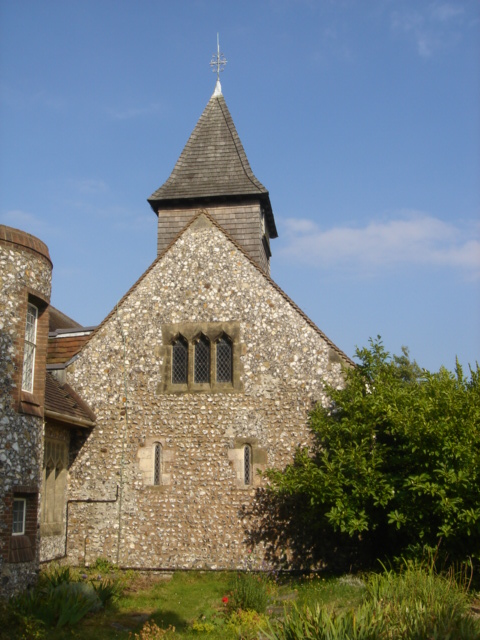
The west end of the nave, with the narrow Norman-era windows below a modern triple-light window, and the bell tower above

The church is in three distinct parts—Saxon/Norman, late 19th century and mid-20th century—which nevertheless blend together well. As originally built, the church was approximately 35 feet (11 m) long and 16 feet (5 m) wide, rectangular, built of flint rubble with stones and tile fragments recovered from the Roman site, and featuring an altar in the centre. A chancel was then added during the early Norman era, as were two narrow windows in the west wall of the nave which have been preserved in the present structure. The south and west walls are mostly original. The 19th-century rebuilding kept as much of the nave and chancel intact as possible, and added a short weatherborded bell-tower topped with a spire at the west end; a porch on the south side with a gabled roof; three Decorated-style lancet windows; and a barrel vault roof. The bell in the bell-tower was cast in London in 1844.

The changes of 1960–1962 added a larger nave and chancel on the north side. The old and new naves are connected by an arcade with five bays, with the clerestory arrangement above. The new nave has six bays and a gallery with an organ. The interior is mostly rendered. Knapped flintwork and brick and stone dressings were used on the exterior. The interior fittings are fairly austere, and no internal fixtures remain from the ancient church; a 16th-century brass memorial tablet commemorating the Scrase family was taken to St Nicolas Church, Portslade and installed in the south aisle there.

== The church today ==
St Peter's was listed at Grade II* on 24 March 1950. As of February 2001, it was one of 70 Grade II*-listed buildings and structures, and 1,218 listed buildings of all grades, in the city of Brighton and Hove. Worship is in the Reformed Catholic tradition of the Church of England. There is a parish Eucharist on Sunday at 10am with Sunday school and once or twice a month, a teens group called spy.

The parish, which was established in 1940, covers a large area north of Hove immediately west of the Brighton boundary, although much of it is uninhabited downland. The boundaries are Goldstone Crescent, The Droveway, Nevill Road, the land behind Nevill Avenue, Hangleton Road and Amberley Drive; the South Downs as far as Waterhall Golf Course; Mill Road and Woodland Avenue.

Since 2008, the church has been part of the Portslade and Western Hove Group Ministry. Its other churches are the Bishop Hannington Memorial Church, St Helen's at Hangleton, St Nicolas' at Portslade, St Philip's and St Leonard's in Aldrington, Holy Cross at Hove and the Good Shepherd at Mile Oak.

== Notable burials ==
- Reginald John Campbell, the theologian, is buried in the churchyard.

== See also ==
- Grade II* listed buildings in Brighton and Hove
- List of places of worship in Brighton and Hove

== Bibliography ==
- Carder, Timothy (1990). The Encyclopaedia of Brighton. Lewes: East Sussex County Libraries. ISBN 0-86147-315-9.
- Dale, Antony (1989). Brighton Churches. London: Routledge. ISBN 0-415-00863-8.
- Middleton, Judy (2002). The Encyclopaedia of Hove & Portslade. Brighton: Brighton & Hove Libraries.
- Nairn, Ian; Pevsner, Nikolaus (1965). The Buildings of England: Sussex. Harmondsworth: Penguin Books. ISBN 0-14-071028-0.
- Whiteman, Ken; Whiteman, Joyce (1998). Ancient Churches of Sussex. Seaford: S.B. Publications. ISBN 1-85770-154-2.
