= Holy Trinity Church, Brighton =

Holy Trinity Church
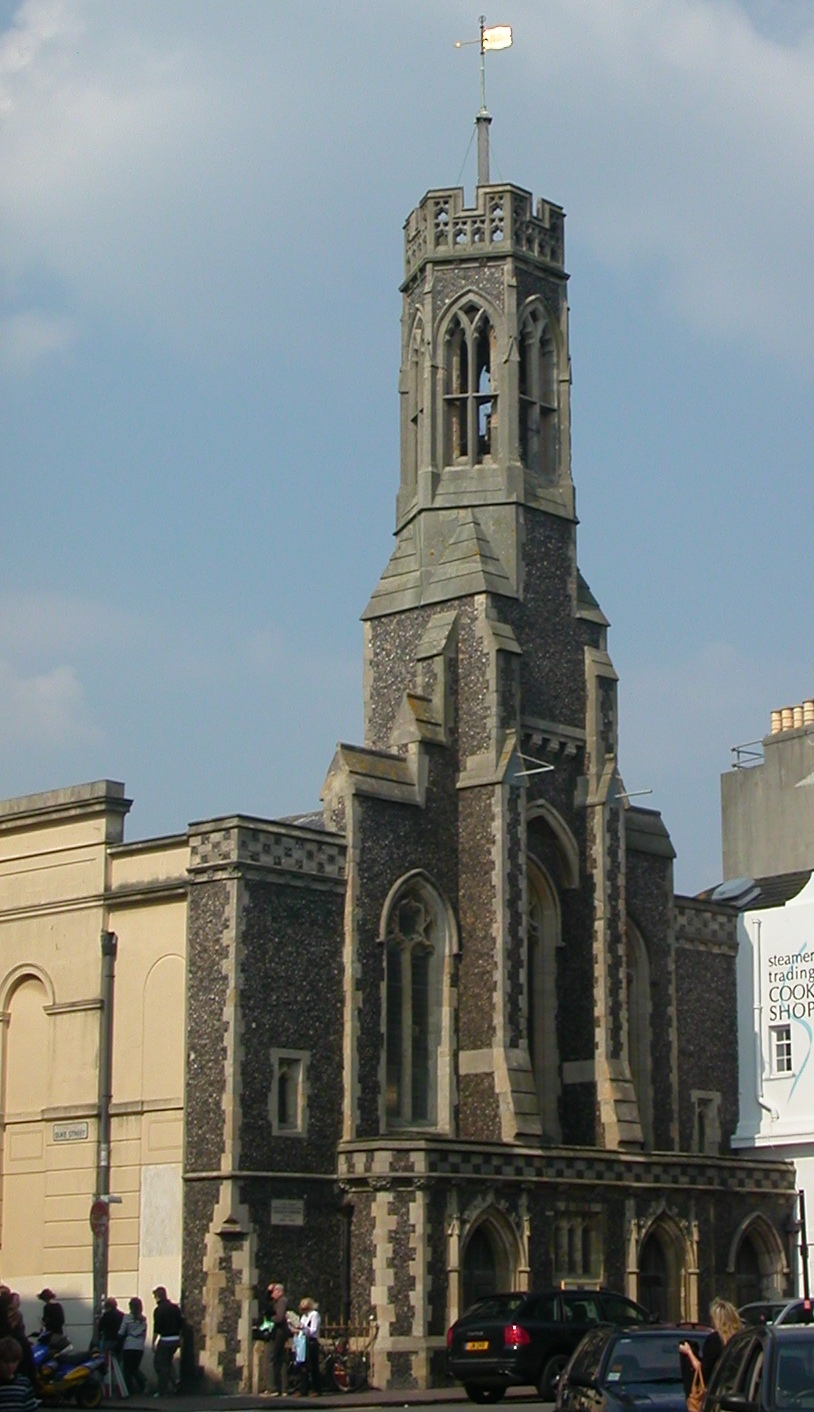
- The eastern face of the church
- Holy Trinity Church
- 50.8228°N 0.1420°W
- Location: Ship Street, Brighton, Brighton and Hove BN1 1AG
- Country: England
- Denomination: Anglican

History
- Status: Chapel of ease
- Founded: 1817
- Founder: Thomas Read Kemp
- Dedication: Holy Trinity
- Consecrated: 1826

Architecture
- Functional status: Art gallery
- Heritage designation: Grade II listed
- Designated: 2 March 1981
- Architect: George Somers Clarke Jr.
- Style: Gothic Revival (Perpendicular/Decorated)
- Closed: 30 October 1984

The former Holy Trinity Church, a closed Anglican church in the centre of Brighton, part of the English city of Brighton and Hove, now serves as an art gallery. Established in the early 19th century by Thomas Read Kemp, an important figure in Brighton's early political and religious life, it was originally an independent Nonconformist chapel but became an Anglican chapel of ease when Kemp returned to the Church of England. The church closed in 1984, but was converted into a museum and later an art gallery. Reflecting its architectural and historical importance, it has been listed at Grade II since 1981.

== History ==
Thomas Read Kemp, born in nearby Lewes in 1782, was heavily involved in Brighton's development in the first decades of the 19th century, until he left the country in 1837 to escape his debts. He became the Member of Parliament for Lewes in 1811, but left both the position and the Church of England in 1816 to found an independent Christian sect in Brighton. He moved to the town in 1819, became a major landowner, magistrate, town official and the developer of the high-class Kemp Town estate which still bears his name.

Brighthelmston Chapels of Ease Act 1826
- Act of Parliament
- Parliament of the United Kingdom
- Long title: An Act for the Appropriation of Two Chapels as Chapels of Ease to the Parish Church of Brighthelmston, in the County of Sussex.
- Citation: 7 Geo. 4. c. iii

Dates
- Royal assent: 22 March 1826

Text of statute as originally enacted

His sect was based at the former St James's Chapel in St James's Street, built between 1810 and 1813. It was intended to serve as a chapel of ease to St Nicholas' Church, but was used by various Nonconformist congregations for its first few years until the Vicar of Brighton found a suitable curate. In 1817, Kemp's uncle Nathaniel bought the church on behalf of the Church of England. At that time, Kemp commissioned Amon Wilds to build a new chapel for him. Situated on the west side of the northern section of Ship Street, which was then a separate entity named Ship Street Lane, it featured a pediment and a square tower, under which was a glass dome which illuminated the interior, and a stuccoed exterior. Although Kemp converted back to Anglicanism in 1823, the chapel remained independent until 1826: a recently ordained priest, Revd Robert Anderson (the brother of the incumbent at St George's Church in Kemp Town) bought it in 1825 and converted it via a local act of Parliament, the Brighthelmston Chapels of Ease Act 1826 (7 Geo. 4. c. iii), into a private Anglican chapel. It was consecrated on 21 April 1826 and altered internally; by 1829 its seating capacity was 800.

The chapel became very fashionable for several decades afterwards. Rev. Anderson and one of his successors, Rev. Frederick W. Robertson, were popular and successful preachers. Robertson in particular had a significant impact on life in Brighton: he undertook missionary work in the town, founded a working men's institute and preached radical, unorthodox but effective sermons which became famous throughout Britain. A plaque on the outside wall records Robertson's six-year preaching career.

A chancel was added in 1867. The Church of England bought the building for £6,500 in 1878, and it was altered significantly in the next few years by George Somers Clarke Jr. and John T. Micklethwaite. The eastern face, fronting Ship Street, was reclad in flint and restyled in Gothic Revival fashion, and a much taller octagonal tower replaced the existing square structure. This contrasted with the stuccoed south face, which had been hidden behind a house until the 1867 rebuilding but which now abutted the newly widened Duke Street. Reginald John Campbell was the priest here from 1924 to 1930.

The church was always unparished, and experienced declining congregations throughout the 20th century. Originally proposed for closure in the middle of the century, it survived until 1984, although its last perpetual curate had left in 1971. The Diocese of Chichester declared it redundant as from 1 November 1984, and it closed in December of that year.

== Architecture ==
The original building of 1817 was in the Doric style and featured a square tower and a portico with four Doric columns. When Rev. Robert Anderson bought the church from Thomas Read Kemp in 1825, he removed this feature and extended the building northwards. There were more alterations in 1855, and the widening of Duke Street (which runs along the south side of the church) made the southern face visible for the first time. This has a series of round-headed, blank-faced arches. Also at this time, the chancel was built to replace the vestry. Its three round-arched lancet windows are prominent on the eastern façade.

The greatest changes, which have given the building its present appearance, took place between 1885 and 1887. Somers Clarke and Micklethwaite redesigned the east-facing exterior in a style incorporating elements of the Perpendicular and Decorated forms of Gothic Revival architecture. They used knapped flint and stone dressings; the south face, with the rounded arches, retains the stucco work from the changes in the 1860s.

== The church since closure ==
Soon after the Diocese of Chichester declared the church redundant, it leased the building to a group who established a museum. Since 1996, however, it has been used as an art gallery by the organisation Fabrica.

Holy Trinity Church was listed at Grade II by English Heritage on 2 March 1981. It is one of 1,124 Grade II-listed buildings and structures, and 1,218 listed buildings of all grades, in the city of Brighton and Hove.

== See also ==
- Grade II listed buildings in Brighton and Hove: E–H
- List of places of worship in Brighton and Hove

== Bibliography ==
- Carder, Timothy (1990). The Encyclopaedia of Brighton. Lewes: East Sussex County Libraries. ISBN 0-86147-315-9.
- Dale, Antony (1989). Brighton Churches. London: Routledge. ISBN 0-415-00863-8.
- Nairn, Ian; Pevsner, Nikolaus (1965). The Buildings of England: Sussex. Harmondsworth: Penguin Books. ISBN 0-14-071028-0.
