= Frederick William Robertson =

British writer and theologian

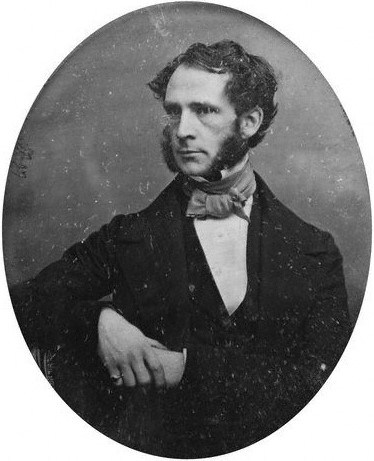
Frederick William Robertson in c. 1850

Frederick William Robertson (3 February 1816 – 15 August 1853), known as Robertson of Brighton, was an English divine.

== Biography ==
Born in London, the first five years of his life were passed at Leith Fort, where his father, a captain in the Royal Artillery, was then resident. The military spirit entered into his blood, and throughout life he was characterised by the qualities of the ideal soldier. In 1821 Captain Robertson retired to Beverley, where the boy was educated. At the age of fourteen he spent a year at Tours, from which he returned to Scotland, and continued his education at the Edinburgh Academy and university.

In 1834 he was articled to a solicitor in Bury St Edmunds, but the uncongenial and sedentary employment soon broke down his health. He was anxious for a military career, and his name was placed upon the list of the 3rd Dragoons, then serving in India. For two years he worked hard in preparing for the army, but, by a singular conjunction of circumstances and at the sacrifice of his own natural bent to his father's wish, he matriculated at Brasenose College, Oxford, just two weeks before his commission was put into his hands.

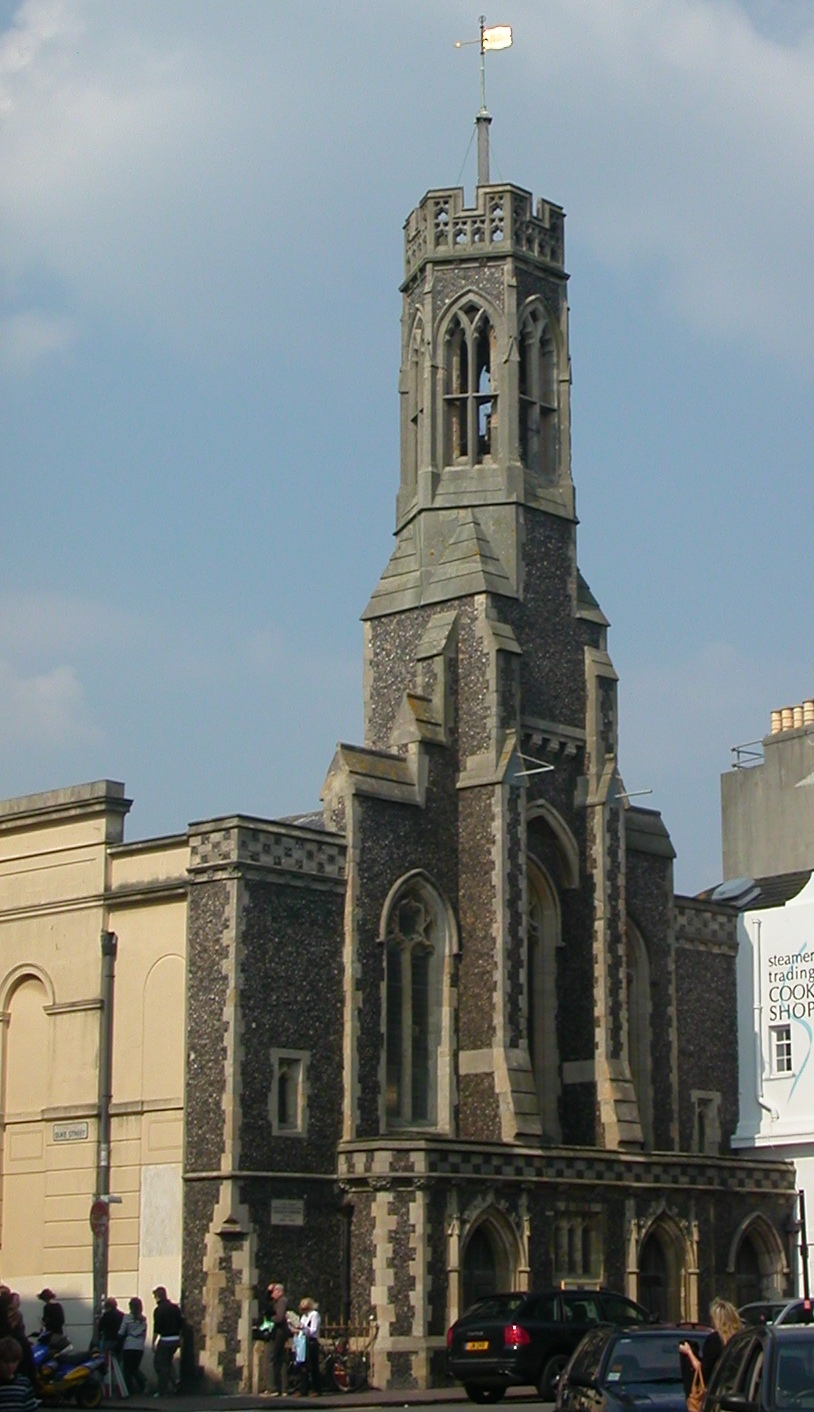
Holy Trinity Church, Brighton, where Robertson preached.

He did not find Oxford wholly congenial to his intensely earnest spirit, but he read hard, and, as he afterwards said, "Plato, Aristotle, Butler, Thucydides, Sterne, Jonathan Edwards; passed like the iron atoms of the blood into my mental constitution." At the same time he made a careful study of the Bible, committing to memory the entire New Testament both in English and in Greek. The Tractarian movement had no attraction for him, although he admired some of its leaders.

He was at this time a moderate Calvinist in doctrine, and enthusiastically evangelical. Ordained in July 1840 by the bishop of Winchester, he at once entered on ministerial work in that city, and during his ministry there and under the influence of the missionaries Henry Martyn and David Brainerd, whose lives he studied, he carried devotional asceticism to an injurious length. In less than a year he was compelled to seek relaxation; and 'going to Switzerland he there met and married Helen, third daughter of Sir George William Denys, Bart.

Early in 1842, after a few months' rest, he accepted a curacy in Cheltenham, which he retained for upwards of four years. The questioning spirit was first aroused in him by the disappointing fruit of evangelical doctrine which he found in Cheltenham, as well as by intimacy with men of varied reading. But, if we are to judge from his own statement in a letter from Heidelberg in 1846, the doubts which now actively assailed him had long been latent in his mind. The crisis of his mental conflict had just been passed in Tirol, and he was now beginning to let his creed grow again from the one fixed point, which nothing had availed to shift:

"The one great certainty to which, in the midst of the darkest doubt, I never ceased to cling—the entire symmetry and loveliness and the unequalled nobleness of the humanity of the Son of Man."

After this mental revolution he felt unable to return to Cheltenham, but after doing duty for two months at St Ebbe's, Oxford, he entered in August 1847 on his famous ministry at Holy Trinity Church, Brighton. Here he stepped at once into the foremost rank as a preacher, and his church was thronged with thoughtful men of all classes in society and of all shades of religious belief. His fine appearance, his flexible and sympathetic voice, his manifest sincerity, the perfect lucidity and artistic symmetry of his address, and the brilliance with which he illustrated his points would have attracted hearers even had he had little to say. But he had much to say. He was not, indeed, a scientific theologian; but his insight into the principles of the spiritual life was unrivalled. As his biographer says, thousands found in his sermons "a living source of impulse, a practical direction of thought, a key to many of the problems of theology, and above all a path to spiritual freedom." Rabbi Duncan, however, said of him, "Robertson believed that Christ did something or other, which, somehow or other, had some connection or other with salvation."

Robertson's closing years were full of sadness. His sensitive nature was subjected to extreme suffering, arising mainly from the opposition aroused by his sympathy with the revolutionary ideas of the 1848 epoch. Moreover, he was crippled by incipient disease of the brain, which at first inflicted unconquerable lassitude and depression, and latterly agonising pain. On 5 June 1853 he preached for the last time, and on 15 August he died. For the last three years of his life he had lived at 60 Montpelier Road in the Montpelier area of Brighton; between 1847 and 1850 he lived at 9 Montpelier Terrace.

Robertson's published works include five volumes of sermons, two volumes of expository lectures, on Genesis and on the epistles to the Corinthians, a volume of miscellaneous addresses, and an Analysis of "In Memoriam." See Life and Letters by Stopford A Brooke (1865).
