= West Blatchington =

Suburb of Hove, Sussex, England

Coordinates: 50.846°N 0.180°W

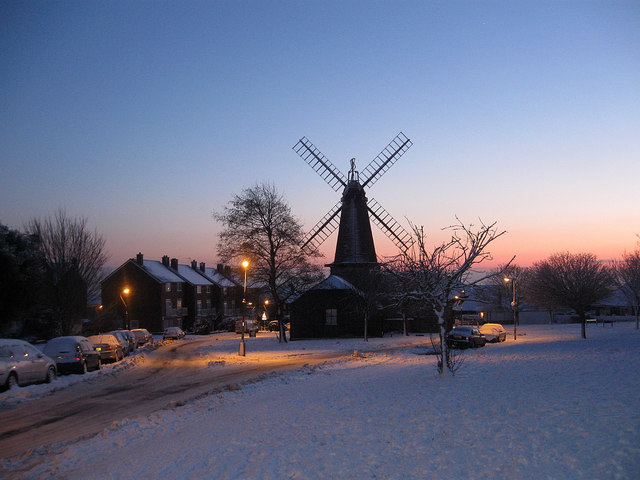
- The windmill

- Location within East Sussex
- Unitary authority: Brighton and Hove
- Ceremonial county: East Sussex
- Region: South East
- Country: England
- Sovereign state: United Kingdom
- Post town: HOVE
- Postcode district: BN3
- Dialling code: 01273
- Police: Sussex
- Fire: East Sussex
- Ambulance: South East Coast
- UK Parliament: Hove

West Blatchington is an area of Hove in the city of Brighton and Hove, in the ceremonial county of East Sussex, England.

The area grew rapidly during the inter-war period, but unlike nearby Hangleton, it had more infrastructure which were; St Peter's Church, a working farm, a windmill and an industrial area grouped around the Goldstone Pumping Station and its workers' cottages.

Blatchington Mill School, formed in 1979 from the Hove County Grammar School, Knoll Boys School and Nevill Secondary School, lies in the centre of West Blatchington.

The area is crossed by the Monarch's Way long-distance footpath, heading towards its terminus at Shoreham-by-Sea.

== Civil parish ==
In 1951 the parish had a population of 5796. On 1 April 1974 the parish was abolished.
